= Milton Marks =

American politician (1920–1998)

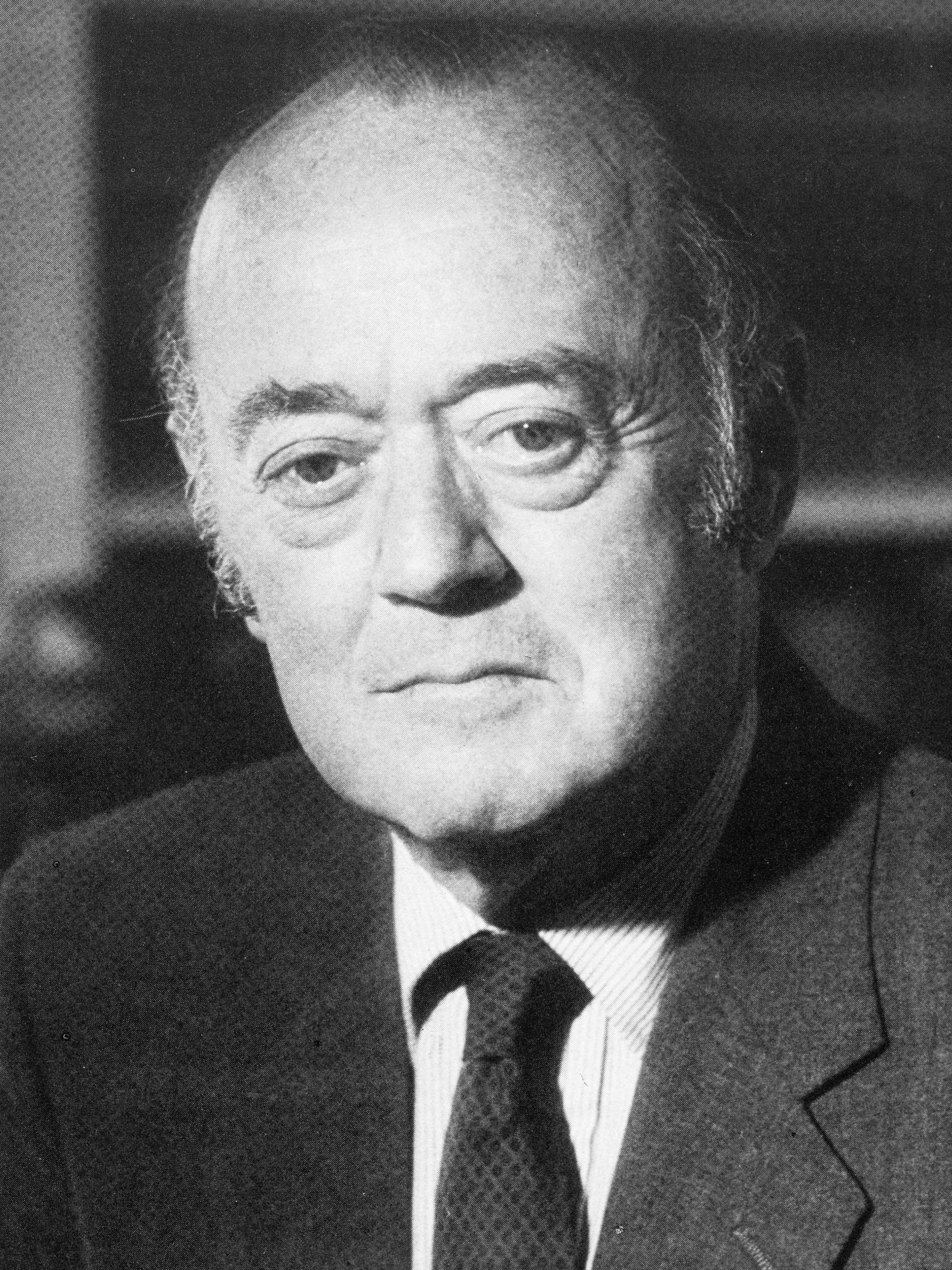
- Marks in 1982

Member of the California State Senate
- In office September 4, 1967 – November 30, 1996
- Preceded by: J. Eugene McAteer
- Succeeded by: John L. Burton
- Constituency: 9th district (1967–1976); 5th district (1976–1984); 3rd district (1984–1996)

Member of the California State Assembly from the 21st district
- In office January 5, 1959 – October 25, 1966
- Preceded by: Caspar Weinberger
- Succeeded by: Gordon W. Duffy

Personal details
- Born: July 22, 1920 San Francisco, California, U.S.
- Died: December 4, 1998 (aged 78) San Francisco, California, U.S.
- Party: Republican (before 1986); Democratic (after 1986)
- Spouse: Carolene Wachenheimer (m. 1955)
- Children: 3
- Education: San Francisco Law School

Military service
- Branch/service: United States Army
- Battles/wars: World War II

Milton Marks Jr. (July 22, 1920 – December 4, 1998) was an American politician who served in the California State Assembly and California State Senate, as both a Republican and a Democrat, representing San Francisco for 38 years.

== Early life ==
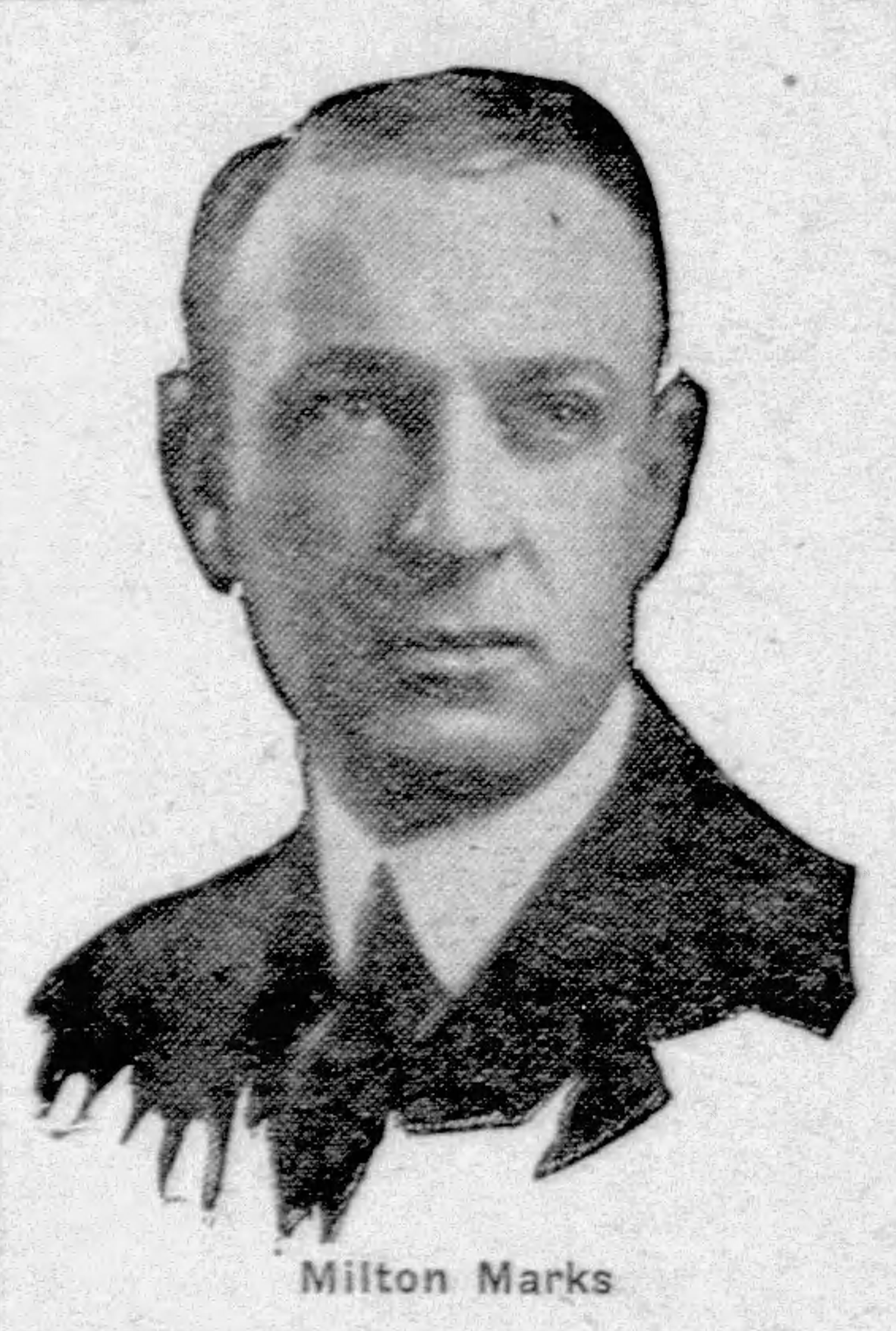
Marks's father Milton Sr. c. 1925

Marks was born in San Francisco on July 22, 1920, the son of assistant city attorney of San Francisco Milton Marks Sr. Marks attended the city's Alamo Grammar School and Galileo High School, where he participated in the Junior Reserve Officers' Training Corps. After graduating from Galileo as valedictorian of the class of 1937, Marks went on to earn an A.B. from Stanford University in 1941, where he had been part of the Army Reserve Officers' Training Corps. Marks went on to the UC Berkeley School of Law and was studying with a friend, future federal judge Milton Lewis Schwartz, at International House Berkeley during the attack on Pearl Harbor.

Less than a month after the attack, Marks reported to Fort Ord as a second lieutenant in the United States Army. Serving in the Pacific Theater of Operations, including the Philippines Campaign (1944–45), he was the Assistant Defense Counsel for the Court of the Eighth United States Army during the Occupation of Japan. After completing his Army service as a Major, Marks returned to the UC Berkeley Law School but eventually transferred, graduating from San Francisco Law School in 1949.

== Political career ==
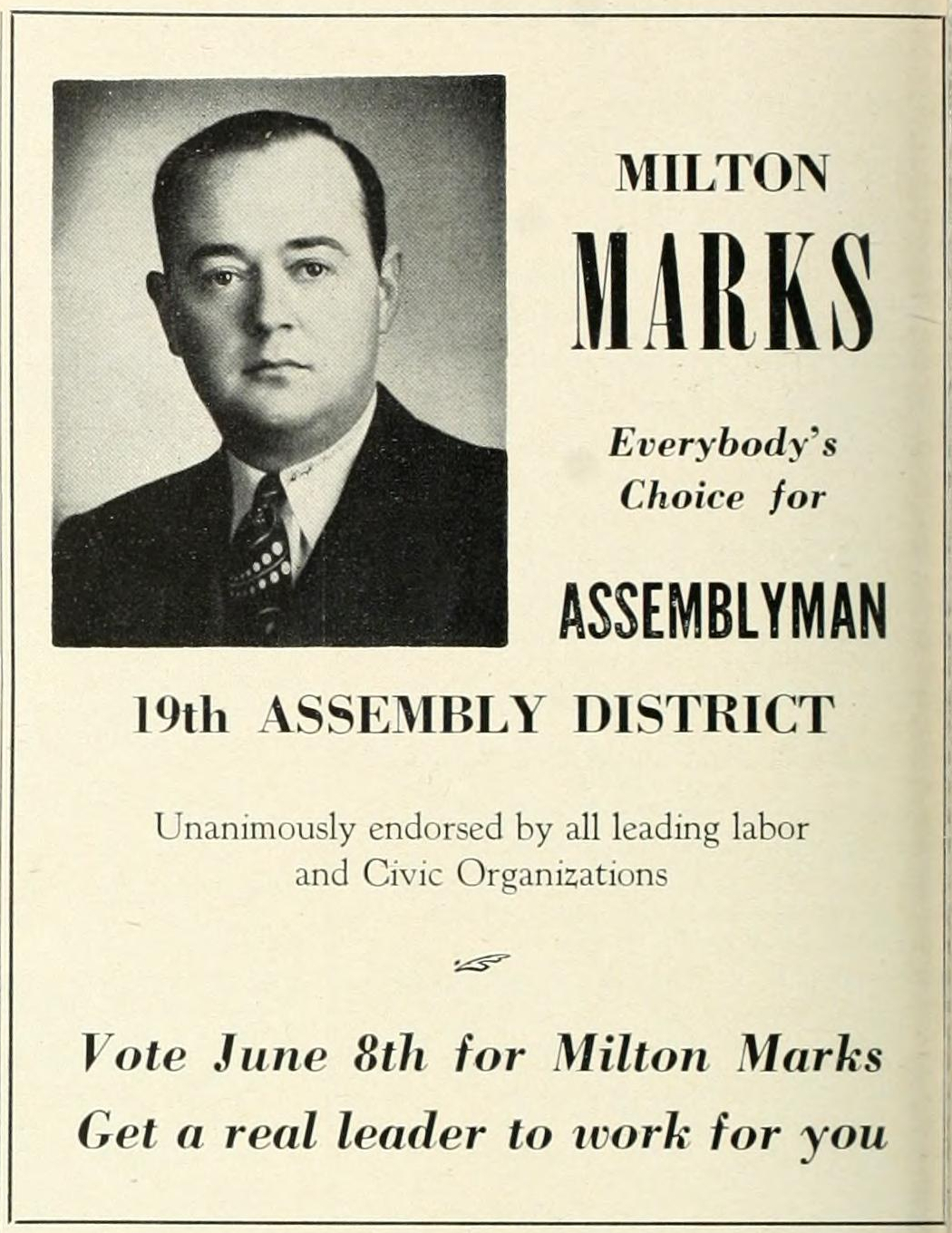
Advertisement from Marks's 1954 campaign for State Assembly

Marks first ran unsuccessfully for the State Assembly in 1954 as a Republican. He was elected in 1958 as a Republican to the Assembly, serving until 1966, when he was named a city judge. When a vacancy occurred in a State Senate seat in 1967, he ran in and won the special election as a Republican, defeating Democrat Assemblyman John L. Burton, who was the younger brother of powerful Democratic Congressman Phil Burton, head of the San Francisco political machine. While still a Republican, Marks made an unsuccessful run for Congress in 1982 to unseat Phil Burton, losing by a margin of 58%-40%. Burton died unexpectedly of an aneurysm five months after the election at the age of 56 and was succeeded by Sala Burton, who would serve in the seat until her death less than four years later when she was succeeded by Nancy Pelosi, a longtime Burton family friend.

He served in the Senate as a Republican until switching to the Democratic Party in January 1986. In 1988 he won his first re-election under his new party affiliation, and won his last Senate term in 1992; term limits forced his retirement in 1996.

== Personal life ==
Marks and his wife, Carolene, had three children: Milton Marks III, who served as a board member of City College of San Francisco, Caro Marks, a Federal Defender in Sacramento, and Edward David Marks, an attorney practicing in the Bay Area.
