= Jeff Brown =

Jeff Brown may refer to:

- Geoffrey F. Brown (born 1943), former member of the California Public Utilities Commission
- Jeff Brown (broadcaster), presenter of Look North
- Jeff "Kase2" Brown (1958–2011), American graffiti artist
- Jeff Brown (author) (1926–2003), author of the Flat Stanley books
- Jeff Brown (basketball) (born 1970), American professional basketball player
- Jeff Brown (ice hockey, born 1966), Canadian former ice hockey defenceman
- Jeff Brown (ice hockey, born 1978), Canadian ice hockey defenceman
- Jeff Brown (judge) (born 1970), United States federal judge
- Jeff Brown (Missouri politician), American politician
- Jeff Brown, British musician and member of Cats in Space
- Jeff Brown (tennis), head men's tennis coach at Louisiana State University
- Jeff Brown, sports announcer and face of Safestyle UK

== See also ==
- Jeffrey Brown (disambiguation)
- Geoffrey Brown (disambiguation), includes Geoff Brown
