= November 2006 San Francisco general election =

The November 2006 San Francisco general elections were held on November 7, 2006, in San Francisco, California. The elections included five seats on the San Francisco Board of Supervisors, positions for San Francisco assessor-recorder and public defender, and eleven San Francisco ballot measures.

== Assessor-Recorder ==
Incumbent assessor-recorder Phil Ting won reelection unopposed.

San Francisco assessor-recorder election, 2006
| Candidate | Votes | % |
|---|---|---|
| Phil Ting (incumbent) | 184,138 | 98.56 |
| Write-in | 2,690 | 1.44 |
| Invalid or blank votes | 66,891 | 26.36 |
| Total votes | 253,719 | 100.00 |
| Turnout | {{{votes}}} | 60.66% |

== Public defender ==
Incumbent public defender Jeff Adachi won reelection unopposed.

San Francisco public defender election, 2006
| Candidate | Votes | % |
|---|---|---|
| Jeff Adachi (incumbent) | 180,771 | 98.85 |
| Write-in | 2,101 | 1.15 |
| Invalid or blank votes | 70,847 | 27.92 |
| Total votes | 253,719 | 100.00 |
| Turnout | {{{votes}}} | 60.66% |

== Propositions ==
Note: "City" refers to the San Francisco municipal government.

=== Proposition A ===

Proposition A would authorize the San Francisco Unified School District to issue $450 million worth of bonds, funded by a property tax increase, to modernize and repair school facilities, and create a citizens' oversight committee to monitor expenditures. This proposition required a majority of 55% to pass.

Proposition A
| Choice | Votes | % |
|---|---|---|
| For | 171,236 | 73.85 |
| Against | 60,640 | 26.15 |
| Required majority | | 55.00 |
| Total | 231,876 | 100.00 |
| Valid votes | 231,876 | 91.39 |
| Invalid/blank votes | 21,843 | 8.61 |
| Total votes | 253,719 | 100.00 |
| Registered voters/turnout | | 60.66 |

=== Proposition B ===

Proposition B would require the Board of Supervisors to create parental leave policies permitting board members and members of other City boards and commissions to attend meetings via teleconference due to pregnancy, childbirth, and other related conditions.

Proposition B
| Choice | Votes | % |
|---|---|---|
| For | 164,166 | 72.22 |
| Against | 63,157 | 27.78 |
| Total | 227,323 | 100.00 |
| Valid votes | 227,323 | 89.60 |
| Invalid/blank votes | 26,396 | 10.40 |
| Total votes | 253,719 | 100.00 |
| Registered voters/turnout | | 60.66 |

=== Proposition C ===

Proposition C would require the Civil Service Commission to set the base salaries of the Mayor, city attorney, district attorney, public defender, assessor-recorder, city treasurer, and sheriff based on the average salaries of comparable officials in other Bay Area counties.

Proposition C
| Choice | Votes | % |
|---|---|---|
| For | 140,561 | 63.33 |
| Against | 81,396 | 36.67 |
| Total | 221,957 | 100.00 |
| Valid votes | 221,957 | 87.48 |
| Invalid/blank votes | 31,762 | 12.52 |
| Total votes | 253,719 | 100.00 |
| Registered voters/turnout | | 60.66 |

=== Proposition D ===

Proposition D would prohibit the city and its contractors from disclosing personal information about individuals except in limited circumstances.

Proposition D
| Choice | Votes | % |
|---|---|---|
| For | 143,020 | 64.35 |
| Against | 79,230 | 35.65 |
| Total | 222,250 | 100.00 |
| Valid votes | 222,250 | 87.60 |
| Invalid/blank votes | 31,469 | 12.40 |
| Total votes | 253,719 | 100.00 |
| Registered voters/turnout | | 60.66 |

=== Proposition E ===

Proposition E would increase the City parking tax from 25% to 35% and extend the tax to include valet parking services even if the valet company does not pay for the property where it parks its cars.

Proposition E
| Choice | Votes | % |
|---|---|---|
| For | 73,922 | 32.77 |
| Against | 151,628 | 67.23 |
| Total | 225,550 | 100.00 |
| Valid votes | 225,550 | 88.90 |
| Invalid/blank votes | 28,169 | 11.10 |
| Total votes | 253,719 | 100.00 |
| Registered voters/turnout | | 60.66 |

=== Proposition F ===

Proposition F would require employers to provide paid sick leave to its employees in San Francisco.

Proposition F
| Choice | Votes | % |
|---|---|---|
| For | 139,005 | 60.95 |
| Against | 89,057 | 39.05 |
| Total | 228,062 | 100.00 |
| Valid votes | 228,062 | 89.89 |
| Invalid/blank votes | 25,657 | 10.11 |
| Total votes | 253,719 | 100.00 |
| Registered voters/turnout | | 60.66 |

=== Proposition G ===

Proposition G would require formula retail use stores to seek Planning Commission conditional use approval before opening a new store in Neighborhood Commercial Districts which permit such stores.

Proposition G
| Choice | Votes | % |
|---|---|---|
| For | 125,728 | 58.19 |
| Against | 90,353 | 41.81 |
| Total | 216,081 | 100.00 |
| Valid votes | 216,081 | 85.17 |
| Invalid/blank votes | 37,638 | 14.83 |
| Total votes | 253,719 | 100.00 |
| Registered voters/turnout | | 60.66 |

=== Proposition H ===

Proposition H would require landlords to provide relocation assistance to eligible residential tenants when evicting them due to no fault of their own.

Proposition H
| Choice | Votes | % |
|---|---|---|
| For | 120,916 | 52.93 |
| Against | 107,541 | 47.07 |
| Total | 228,457 | 100.00 |
| Valid votes | 228,457 | 90.04 |
| Invalid/blank votes | 25,262 | 9.96 |
| Total votes | 253,719 | 100.00 |
| Registered voters/turnout | | 60.66 |

=== Proposition I ===

Proposition I would make it City policy for the Mayor to appear in person at a regularly scheduled Board of Supervisors meeting monthly for formal policy discussions with the Board.

Proposition I
| Choice | Votes | % |
|---|---|---|
| For | 126,023 | 56.36 |
| Against | 97,567 | 43.64 |
| Total | 223,590 | 100.00 |
| Valid votes | 223,590 | 88.13 |
| Invalid/blank votes | 30,129 | 11.87 |
| Total votes | 253,719 | 100.00 |
| Registered voters/turnout | | 60.66 |

=== Proposition J ===

Proposition J would make it City policy to call for the impeachment of President George W. Bush and Vice President Dick Cheney.

Proposition J
| Choice | Votes | % |
|---|---|---|
| For | 133,042 | 58.53 |
| Against | 94,282 | 41.47 |
| Total | 227,324 | 100.00 |
| Valid votes | 227,324 | 89.60 |
| Invalid/blank votes | 26,395 | 10.40 |
| Total votes | 253,719 | 100.00 |
| Registered voters/turnout | | 60.66 |

=== Proposition K ===

Proposition K would make it City policy to acknowledge the housing needs of seniors and disabled adults with little financial means and to explore ways of addressing their needs.

Proposition K
| Choice | Votes | % |
|---|---|---|
| For | 161,684 | 71.30 |
| Against | 65,073 | 28.70 |
| Total | 226,757 | 100.00 |
| Valid votes | 226,757 | 89.37 |
| Invalid/blank votes | 26,962 | 10.63 |
| Total votes | 253,719 | 100.00 |
| Registered voters/turnout | | 60.66 |
