= Kimiko Burton =

American attorney and government official

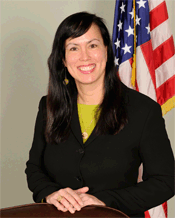

San Francisco Public Defender
- In office 2001–2003
- Preceded by: Geoffrey F. Brown
- Succeeded by: Jeff Adachi

Personal details
- Born: Kimiko Burton; 1964 or 1965 (age 61–62)
- Party: Democratic
- Children: 2
- Parent: John Burton (father)
- Relatives: Phillip Burton (uncle); Sala Burton (aunt)
- Education: University of California, Davis (B.A.); University of California, Hastings College of the Law (J.D.)
- Profession: Lawyer; Politician

Kimiko Burton, formerly Kimiko Burton-Cruz, is an American attorney and government official. Burton is serving a second term as a member of the California State Personnel Board after having been reappointed by Governor Gavin Newsom in 2019. From 2001 to 2003, Burton served as Public Defender of San Francisco.

== Early life and education ==
Burton is the daughter of John Burton, a former member of the U.S. House of Representatives and past chair of the California Democratic Party, and Michele (née Hall) Burton. Both her uncle, Phillip Burton, and her aunt, Sala Burton, served in the U.S. House. Burton's grandmother, Yoshiko Hall, wife of Jack Hall, was a Hawaiian woman of Japanese descent.

Burton graduated from Lowell High School and received her bachelor's degree from the University of California, Davis. Prior to attending law school, Burton studied in Kyoto, Japan at the Kyoto Japanese Language School (Japanese: Kyoto Nihongo Gakko), where she taught both English and French to fellow students. Burton received her Juris Doctor (J.D.) degree from the University of California, Hastings College of the Law in 1990.

== Career ==
In the 1990s, Burton worked in the San Francisco Public Defender's Office. Burton later left the office to work at the California State Board of Equalization, where she served as counsel to Johan Klehs.

=== Public Defender of San Francisco ===
In January 2001, Burton was appointed by Mayor of San Francisco Willie Brown to replace Geoffrey F. Brown as Public Defender, following his appointment to the California Public Utilities Commission. Burton ran for a full term as Public Defender in 2002.

In her campaign, Burton received endorsements from Brown, U.S. Senators Barbara Boxer and Dianne Feinstein, and Representative Nancy Pelosi. However, Burton ultimately lost the election to attorney Jeff Adachi, a former assistant public defender.

=== California State Personnel Board ===
Following her defeat, Burton remained active in politics, endorsing her former boss Johan Klehs in his 2002 campaign for State Controller. Burton went on to work for Dennis Herrera in the City Attorney's office.

Since 2012, Burton has served as a member of the California State Personnel Board, having received a reappointment to the position in 2019 by Governor Gavin Newsom. In September 2020, Burton and three fellow members of the board requested a 9.23% pay cut for their positions, in line with reduced compensation ordered for state workers earlier in the year.

== Personal life ==
Burton was married to school board member Emilio Cruz. She filed for divorce in June 2005.

As of 2022, she lived with her two children in San Francisco, and served on the board of directors of John Burton Advocates for Youth, an organization that advocates for youth who have been in foster care or homeless.
