= Jeff Knight =

Jeff Knight may refer to:

- Jeff Knight (musician), American country music artist
- Jeff Knight (politician) (born 1968), American politician
