= Geoffrey Brown =

Geoffrey Brown may refer to:

- Geoffrey Brown (Australian politician) (1894–1955), Member for McMillan, 1949–1955
- Geoffrey F. Brown (born 1943), former commissioner of the California Public Utilities Commission
- Geoff Brown (tennis) (1924–2001), Australian tennis player of the 1940s and 1950s
- Geoff Brown (businessman) (born c. 1943), Scottish businessman
- Geoff Brown (RAAF officer) (born 1958), senior officer in the Royal Australian Air Force
- Geoff Brown (water polo) (born 1955), Canadian Olympic water polo player
- Geoff Brown, the founder of video game companies U.S. Gold, Silicon Dreams Studio and Kaboom Studios
- A pseudonym of Leo Dorfman

== See also ==
- Geoffrey Browne (disambiguation)
- Jeffrey Brown (disambiguation)
- Jeff Brown (disambiguation)
