= Amparan =

Amparan or Amparán is a Spanish surname. Notable people with the surname include:

- Gabino Amparán (born 1968), Mexican football manager
- Guillermo Amparan (1905–1984), Mexican sprinter
- Gustavo Mendívil Amparán (born 1960), Mexican politician
- Robert Amparan, American criminal defense attorney
