= San Francisco Public Defender's Office =

American local government agency

- Seal of San Francisco

Department overview
- Department executive: Manohar Raju, Public Defender of San Francisco
- Website: sfpublicdefender.org

The San Francisco Public Defender's Office is an agency of the Government of San Francisco. Since 1921, it has provided legal assistance to indigent individuals charged with violations of California state law by the San Francisco District Attorney's Office.

Courts within its jurisdiction include the San Francisco Superior Court, the California Court of Appeal for the First District, and the California Supreme Court. The current Public Defender of San Francisco is Manohar Raju, who was appointed to the position in 2019.

== History ==
The Public Defender's office was founded in 1921 with only one attorney, former police officer Frank Egan, and no support staff. Over the course of Egan's tenure, the office grew to over a dozen attorneys and a few support staff. In 1932, Frank Egan was arrested for the murder of a close friend and former client whose financial affairs he had managed. He was ultimately convicted of first degree murder and sentenced to life in prison.

Following Egan's arrest, Gerald J. Kenny was appointed Public Defender in 1932 and subsequently elected. Under the City Charter, San Francisco became the first and only city in the state to elect its Public Defender by popular vote. Kenny served for two decades, until his death in 1954. Kenny was a pioneer in the office's long tradition of helping former prisoners turn their lives around.

Edward Mancuso was appointed in 1954 to complete Kenney's term, and he served until his retirement in 1974. Under Mancuso, the office began representing indigent people accused of misdemeanors as well as those accused of felonies. In 1965, Mancuso appointed the office's first African-American female attorney, Estella Dooley, who later established the Mental Health unit of the office.

In 1974, Robert Nicco was appointed Public Defender and subsequently elected, after having served as Chief Attorney under Mancuso. Under Nicco, Fred Smith served as the office's first African-American Chief Attorney from 1974 to 1979, and the office hired Manoucher Farzan, who was the first Persian-American attorney in the United States.

In 1978, Geoffrey F. Brown was elected Public Defender of San Francisco and was re-elected five times. Brown worked to increase staffing to handle the office's growing caseload, which had grown to 20,000 clients each year. During Brown's tenure, the Public Defender's Office grew to a staff of 83 attorneys and 40 support personnel.

Jeff Adachi was elected San Francisco Public Defender in November 2002 and held office from January 2003 until his death in February 2019. In February 2011, Adachi appointed Matt Gonzalez chief attorney in the Public Defender's Office. As of 2012, the San Francisco Public Defender's Office is one of the most diverse law offices in the country, with over 55% women and 50% minorities and LGBT attorneys and staff.

In 2016, the office became involved in the Frisco Five protest. The San Francisco Public Defender Jeff Adachi sent California Attorney General Kamala Harris a request that supported the protestor's claims of racism by the San Francisco Police Department, and requested a civil rights investigation that would be enforceable. After Gongora's death, Adachi was joined by District Attorney George Gascon, Mission District Supervisor David Campos, and other stakeholders to protest the lack of transparency and need for police reform.

Following Adachi's death, Manohar Raju was chosen to appointed him in 2019, and was formally elected to the position in November 2019. Raju is the only elected public defender in California and runs an office of more than 100 attorneys and 60 staff members, which has a $24 million budget and serves 23,000 clients each year.

== Henry Hotel scandal ==
In March 2011, Adachi released surveillance tape gathered by public defender investigators showing plainclothes narcotics officers from the San Francisco Police Department entering rooms in the Henry Hotel and conducting warrantless searches of rooms and people, taking property from residents, and roughing up citizens. Corresponding police reports and testimony in resulting cases did not correspond with evidence shown on surveillance, leading Adachi to accuse the officers of perjury.

Adachi further revealed evidence that owners of single resident occupancy hotels had been bullied by police into handing over master keys to tenant rooms. Over the next several months, the public defender's office released similar video from several other hotels, implicating officers from the Mission and Southern station and prompting the FBI to launch an investigation. In February, 2014, five veteran San Francisco police officers and a former officer were indicted on federal corruption charges connected to the misconduct first revealed by public defenders.

== Programs ==
=== Clean Slate ===
In 1999, the San Francisco Public Defender's office launched a Clean Slate program to expunge the criminal records of people whose old convictions had become obstacles to obtaining work, housing, and educational opportunities.

=== Immigration Unit ===
In May, 2017, in response to expanded federal immigration enforcement priorities and increased arrests, the office launched its Immigration Unit, an innovative legal team that aids immigrant detainees.

=== LEAP ===
The Legal Educational Advocacy Program (LEAP) assigning an attorney trained in education law to serve families of youth represented by public defenders in criminal cases. The program, which also includes social workers, helps court involved youth stay in school by ensuring access to special education services through the public school system. It also provides legal representation at families during public school disciplinary hearings. The program received a 2014 Managerial Excellence Award from civic planning organization SPUR.

=== Bail Reform Advocacy ===
The office has been at the front of bail reform efforts in California, filing lawsuits on behalf of its clients and challenging bail in nearly every case. The appeal on behalf of client Kenneth Humphrey led to the revolutionary “Humphrey decision” which held that judges must hold a hearing to consider how a defendant's financial circumstances affect the ability to pay bail and also consider non-monetary alternatives when setting bail.

=== Pretrial Release Unit ===
In October, 2017, the office launched its Pretrial Release Unit, which aims to reduce wealth disparities in pre-arraignment representation and unnecessary pre-trial incarceration by providing legal advice and advocacy to indigent arrestees. The program likewise aims to reduce the county jail population by increasing arrestees’ likelihood of pretrial release A study from the California Policy Lab at University of California Berkeley found that the program saved $806,508 in taxpayer money and thousands of jail beds during its first five months of operation.

== Films ==
The office was featured in the 2002 PBS documentary Presumed Guilty, a film about the San Francisco Public Defender's office, its difficult cases and complex defense strategies.

Another film, the 2017 independent documentary Defender, was named the 2017 Best Documentary at ITVFest (Independent Television Festival).

== Notable defenders ==
- Manohar Raju
- Jeff Adachi
- Robert Amparan
- Chesa Boudin
- Kimiko Burton
- Jami Floyd
- Matt Gonzalez
- Mike Guingona
- Gerardo Sandoval
