= Geoffrey Browne =

Geoffrey Browne may refer to:

- Geoffrey Browne, 3rd Baron Oranmore and Browne (1861–1927), Irish politician
- Geoffrey Browne (MP) (died 1668), Irish lawyer and politician

== See also ==
- Geoffrey Brown (disambiguation)
