= Jeffrey Brown =

Jeffrey Brown may refer to:

- Jeffrey Brown (cartoonist) (born 1975), American comic book writer and artist
- Jeffrey Brown (journalist) (born 1956), American journalist and former news anchor for the PBS Newshour
- Jeffrey Brown (politician), former Republican state assemblyman in New York
- Jeffrey Brown (professor) (born 1968), American professor at University of Illinois at Urbana-Champaign
- Jeffrey D. Brown, American film and television director
- Jeffrey V. Brown (born 1970), United States federal judge

== See also ==
- Jeff Brown (disambiguation)
- Geoffrey Brown (disambiguation)
