= Government of San Francisco =

City and County of San Francisco
- Seal of San Francisco
- Formation: April 15, 1850; 176 years ago
- Website: sf.gov

City-wide elected officials
- City Attorney: City Attorney of San Francisco
- Public Defender: San Francisco Public Defender's Office

Legislative branch
- Legislature: San Francisco Board of Supervisors
- Meeting place: San Francisco City Hall

Executive branch
- Mayor: San Francisco Mayor
- Appointed by: Election

The government of San Francisco, officially named the City and County of San Francisco, utilizes the "strong mayor" form of mayoral/council government, composed of the Mayor, Board of Supervisors, several elected officers, and numerous other entities. It is the only consolidated city-county in California, and one of only 15 charter counties of California. The fiscal year 2024–25 city and county budget was approximately $15.9 billion.

== Organization ==
San Francisco utilizes the "strong mayor" form of mayoral/council government, composed of the mayor, Board of Supervisors, several elected officers, and numerous other entities. San Francisco voters use ranked-choice voting to elect the mayor, supervisors, and other elective officers.

=== Mayor ===
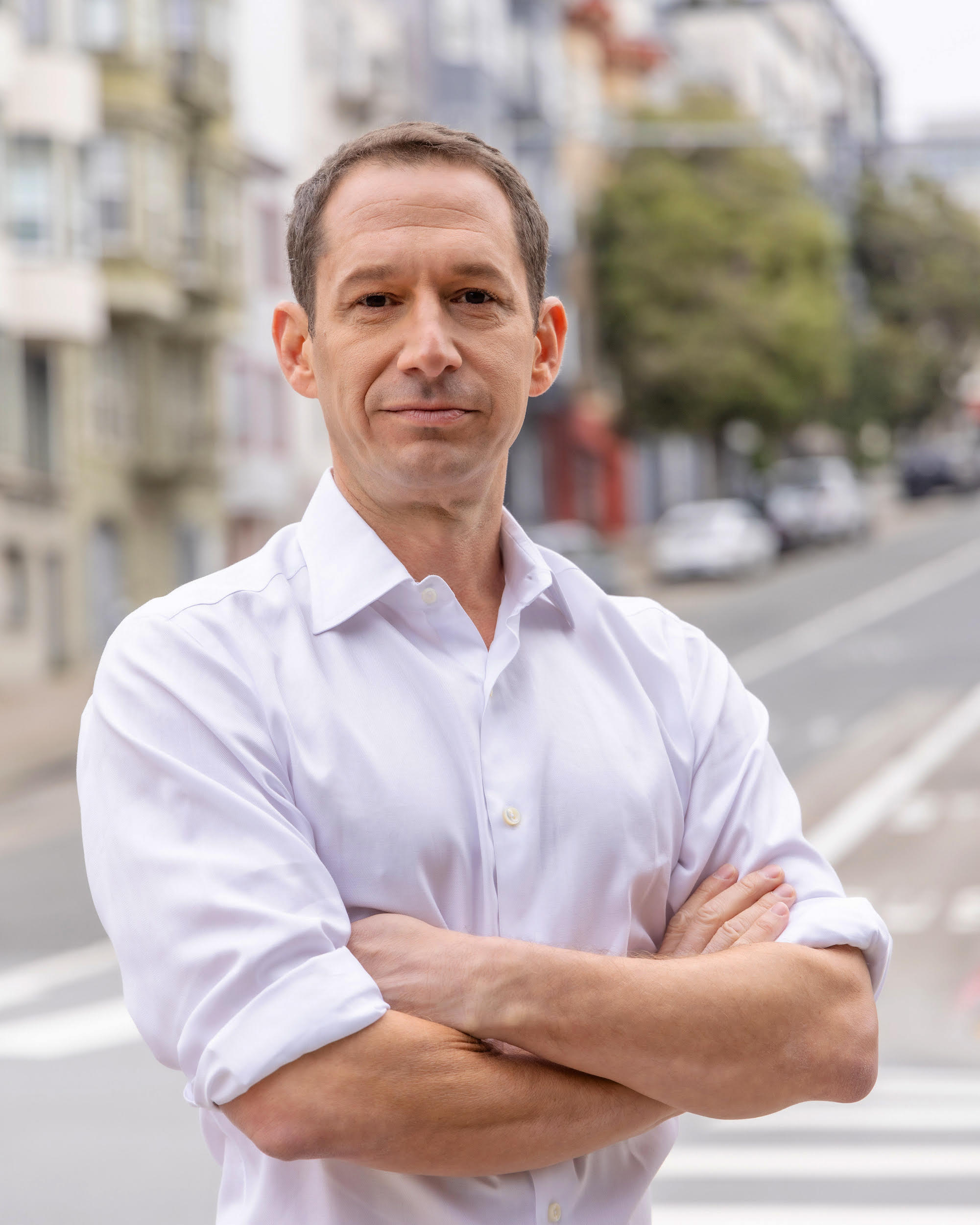
Daniel Lurie, the mayor of San Francisco as of 2025

The Mayor of San Francisco is the head of the executive branch of the city and county government. The mayor has the responsibility to enforce all city laws, administer and coordinate city departments and intergovernmental activities, set forth policies and agendas to the Board of Supervisors, and prepare and submit the city budget at the end of each fiscal year. The mayor has the powers to either approve or veto bills passed by the San Francisco Board of Supervisors, participate in meetings of the Board of Supervisors and its committees, appoint a replacement to fill vacancies in all city elected offices until elections, appoint a member of the Board as acting mayor in his/her absence, and to direct personnel in the case of emergency. The mayor serves a four-year term and is limited to two successive terms. If the mayor dies or resigns, the President of the Board of Supervisors assumes the office as acting mayor. This has occurred twice since the 1970s: Dianne Feinstein became acting mayor after the assassination of George Moscone in 1978, and London Breed became acting mayor following the death of Ed Lee from a heart attack in 2017.

The current mayor as of 2025 is Daniel Lurie.

=== Board of supervisors ===
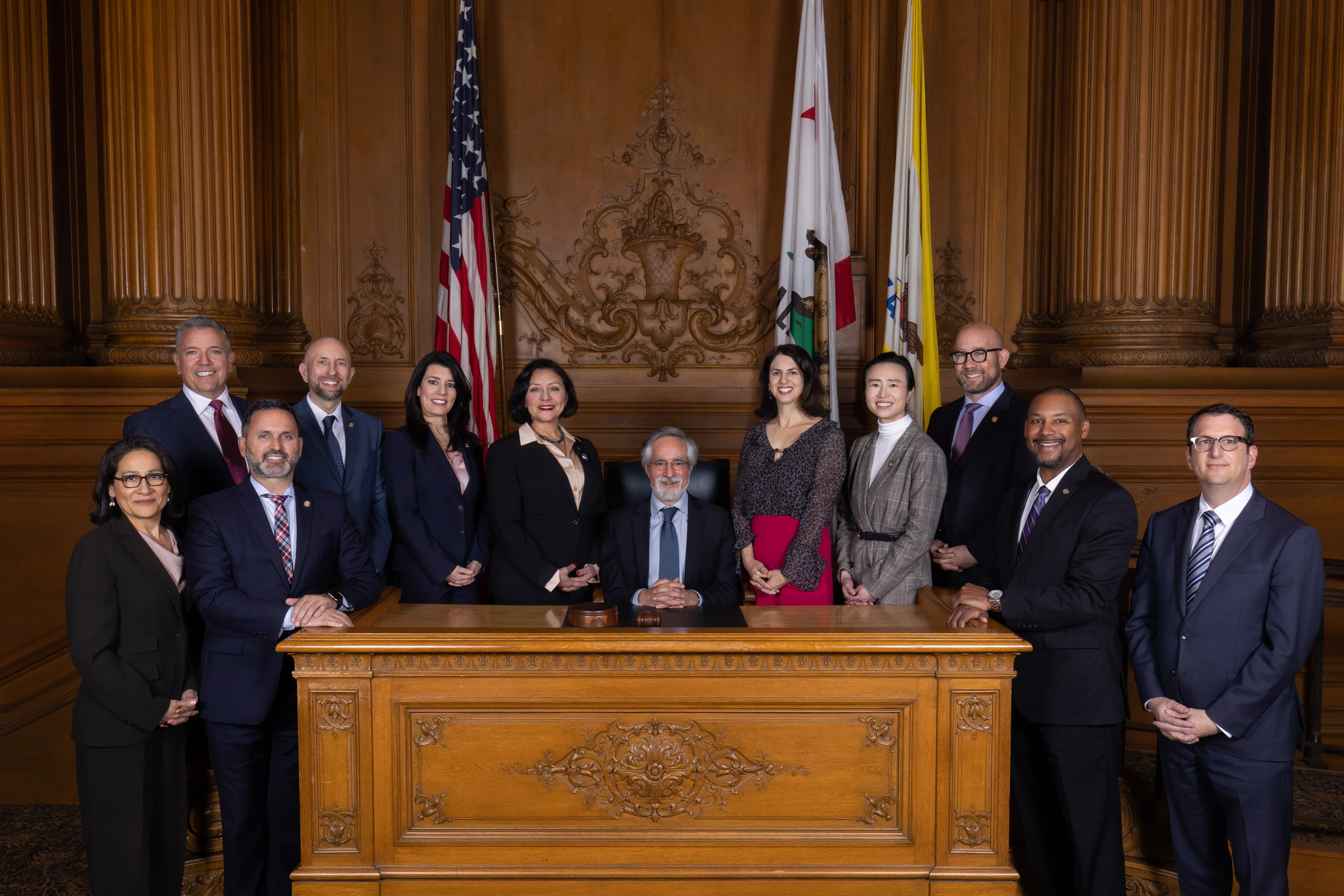
San Francisco Board of Supervisors

The legislative body is composed of the 11-member Board of Supervisors which acts as both a board of supervisors and a city council, with "[a]ll rights and powers of a City and County which are not vested in another officer or entity" by the charter. The Board of Supervisors is headed by a president and is responsible for passing laws and budgets. The members of the Board of Supervisors are elected as representatives of specific districts within the city.

=== Other elected officers ===
In addition, there are other citywide elected officers of San Francisco:

- Assessor-Recorder: Joaquín Torres
- City Attorney of San Francisco: David Chiu
- San Francisco District Attorney: Brooke Jenkins
- San Francisco Public Defender: Manohar Raju
- Sheriff of San Francisco: Paul Miyamoto
- Treasurer and Tax Collector: José Cisneros

=== Departments and agencies ===
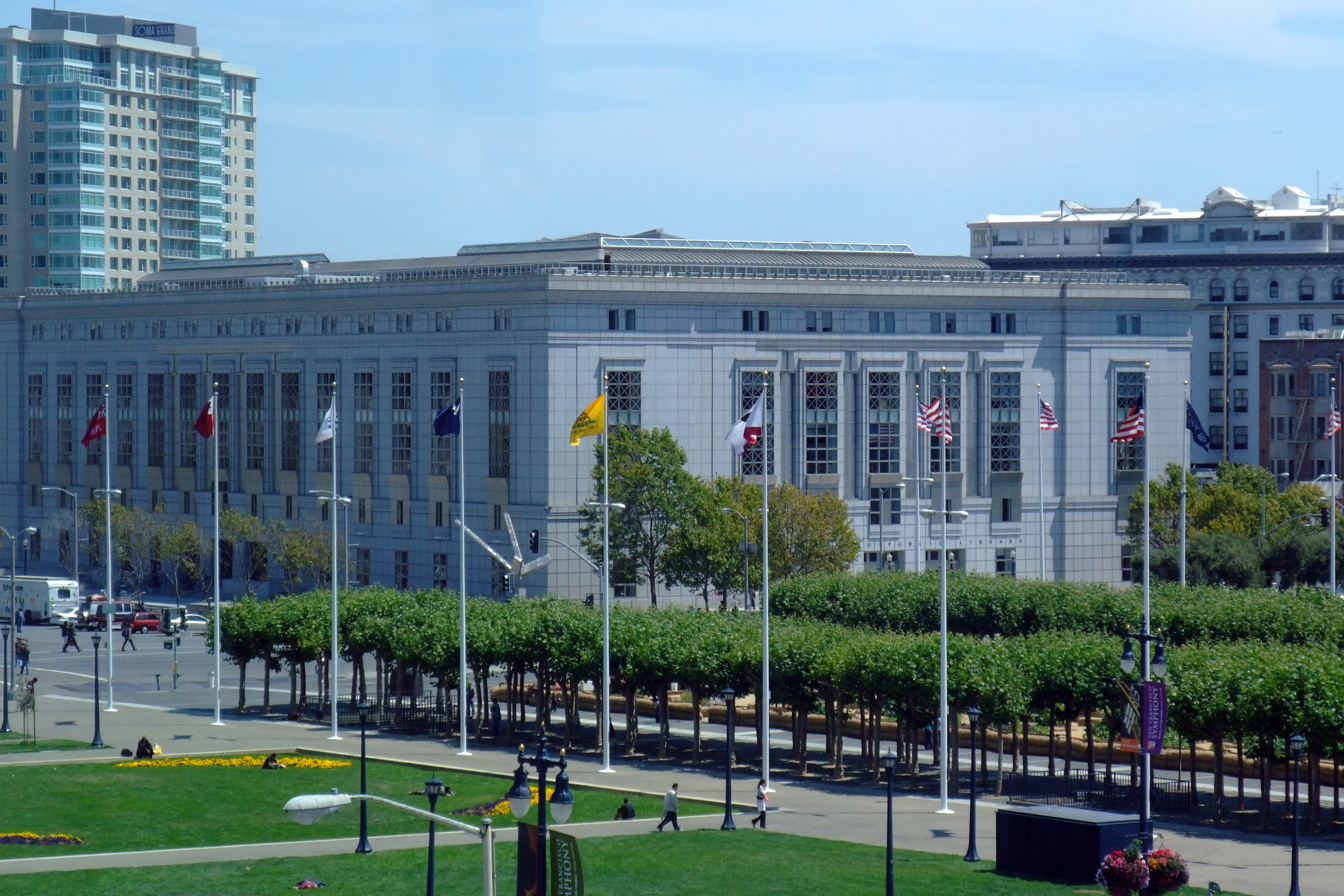
San Francisco Public Library

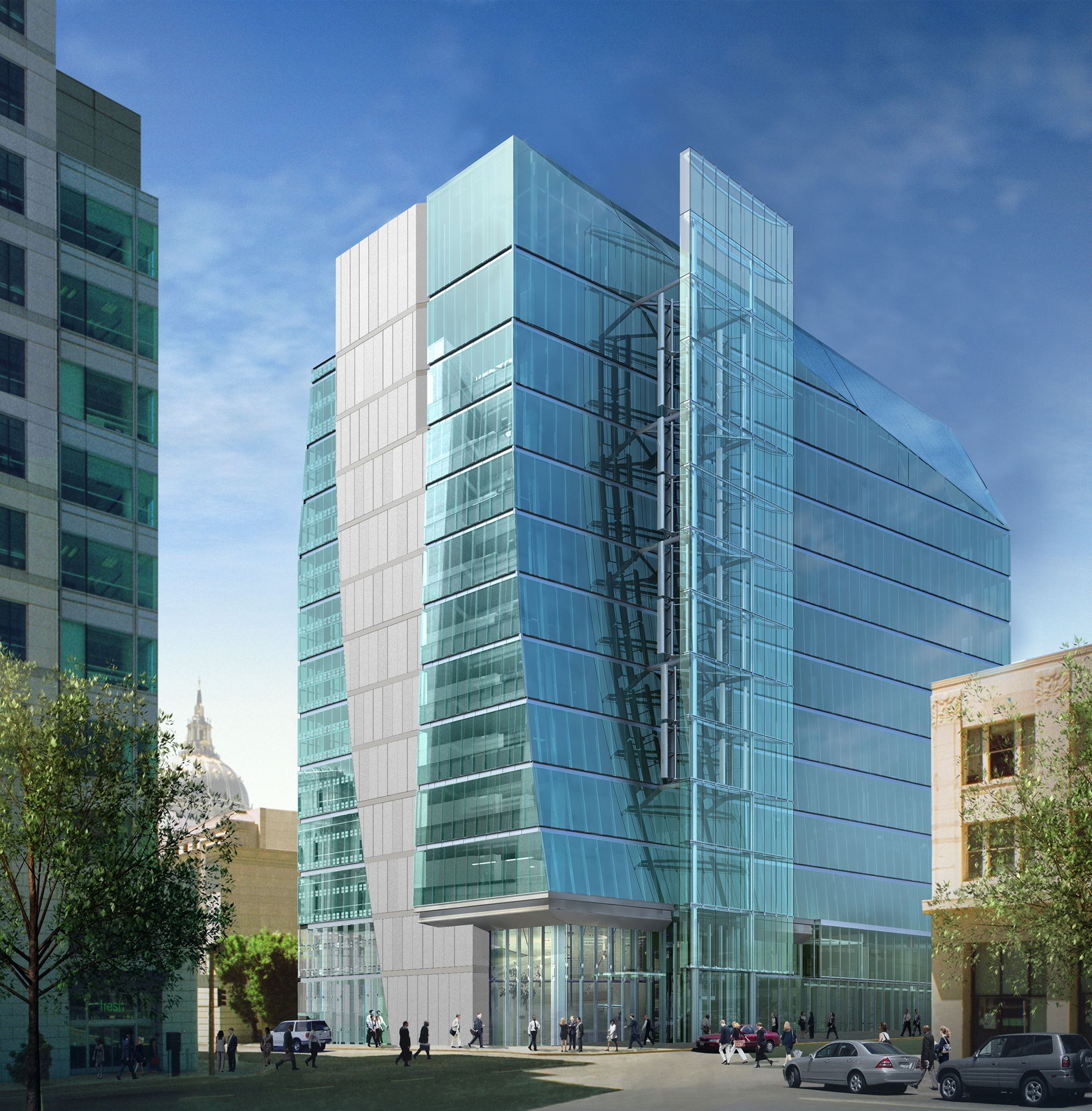
San Francisco Public Utilities Commission

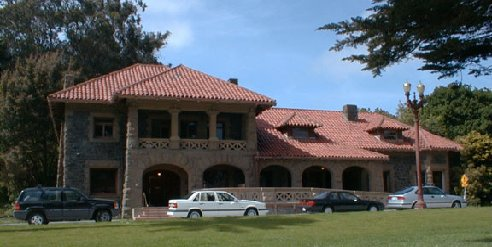
San Francisco Recreation & Parks Department

Entities under the authority of the Board of Supervisors include the:

- Assessment Appeals Board
- San Francisco County Transportation Authority
- San Francisco Youth Commission
- Clerk of the Board of Supervisors
- Budget and Legislative Analyst
- Office of Legislative Analyst
- San Francisco Local Agency Formation Commission
- Sunshine Ordinance Task Force

Entities under the authority of the San Francisco County Superior Court include the:

- Adult Probation

Entities under the authority of the City Administrator include the:

- Academy of Sciences
- San Francisco International Airport
- San Francisco Arts Commission
- Asian Art Museum
- Office of Economic and Workforce Development
- Department of Emergency Management
- Environment Commission
  - Department of the Environment
- General Services Agency
  - Animal Care and Control
  - Convention Facilities Management
  - County Clerk
  - Medical Examiner
  - San Francisco Department of Public Works
  - Purchaser / Office of Contract Administration
  - Real Estate Division
  - Department of Technology
- Department of Children, Youth and Families
- Civil Service Commission
- Fine Arts Museums
- Fire Commission
  - San Francisco Fire Department
- Health Commission
  - Department of Public Health
- Human Resources
- San Francisco Human Rights Commission
- Human Services Agency
- Juvenile Probation Commission
  - Juvenile Probation Department
- Law Library Board of Trustees
- Office of Transgender Initiatives
- San Francisco Public Library
- San Francisco Municipal Transportation Agency
- Port of San Francisco
- San Francisco Public Utilities Commission
- Residential Rent Board
- Employees' Retirement System
- Recreation and Park Commission
  - San Francisco Recreation & Parks Department
- Commission on the Status of Women
  - Department on the Status of Women
- War Memorial

Other independent/semi-independent public entities include the:

- San Francisco Ethics Commission
- San Francisco Police Commission
- San Francisco Police Department
- City College of San Francisco
- San Francisco Housing Authority
- San Francisco Zoo
- Building Inspection Commission, and its Department of Building Inspection

== Finance ==
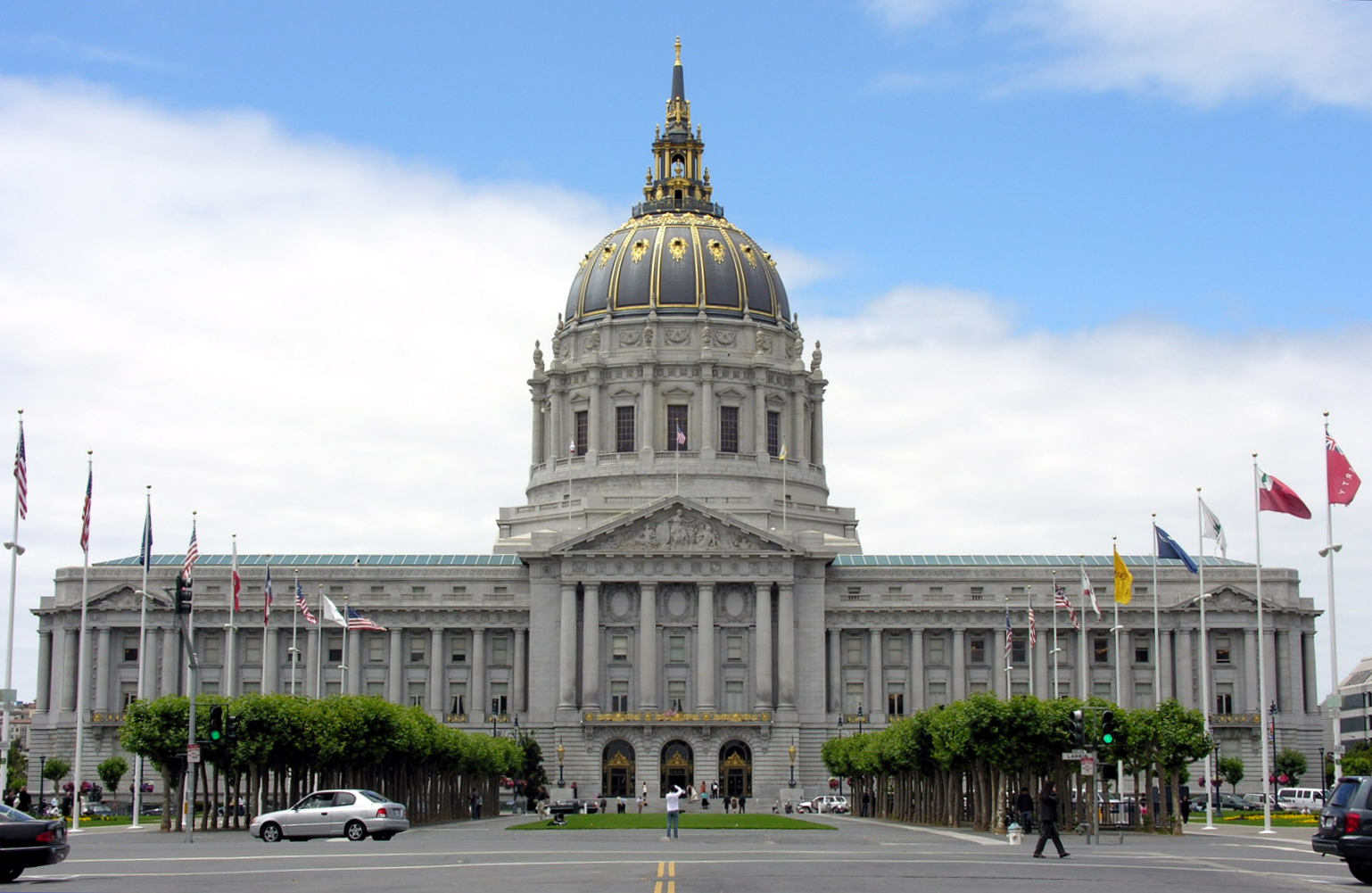
San Francisco City Hall

=== Taxes ===
As of November 2021, San Francisco's sales tax rate was 8.625% distributed as follows:

- 7.25% – California State Sales Tax
  - 6.00% – State
    - 3.9375% – State – General Fund
    - 0.50% – State – Local Public Safety Fund
    - 0.50% – State – Local Revenue Fund for local health and social services
    - 1.0625% – State – Local Revenue Fund (2011)
  - 1.25% – Uniform Local Tax
    - 0.25% – Local County – Transportation funds
    - 1.00% – Local City/County – Operational funds
- 1.375% — City/County Local Taxes
  - 0.50% – AB 1077 (1977) — Bay Area Rapid Transit (BART) District: Bay Area Rapid Transit, San Francisco Municipal Railway, AC Transit
  - 0.50% – Proposition K (2003) – 2009-2034: San Francisco County Transportation Authority
  - 0.125% – Measure RR (2020) – 2021-2051: 2020 Peninsula Corridor Joint Powers Board (Caltrain) Retail Transactions and Use Tax
  - 0.25% – San Francisco County Public Finance Authority —San Francisco Unified School District and City College of San Francisco

=== Budget ===
The fiscal year 2007-08 city and county budget is as follows:

Category	Revenue	Ratio
Charges for services	$1,808 M	29.7%
Property taxes	$1,186 M	19.5%
State	$707 M	11.6%
Other local taxes	$588 M	9.7%
Federal	$360 M	5.9%
Business taxes	$350 M	5.8%
Rents and concessions	$349 M	5.7%
Fund balance from 2006 to 2007	$239 M	3.9%
Fines and forfeitures	$105 M	1.7%
Interest and investment income	$84 M	1.4%
Licenses, permits, and franchises	$36 M	0.6%
Reserves drawdown	$23 M	0.4%
Other	$244 M	4.0%
Total	$6,079 M	100%

Category	Expenditures	Ratio
Personnel	$3.083 B	50.4%
Non-personnel operating costs	$1.438 B	23.7%
Debt service	$576 M	9.5%
Capital and equipment	$335 M	5.5%
Grants	$272 M	4.5%
Aid assistance	$271 M	4.5%
Reserves and fund balance	$69 M	1.1%
Facility maintenance	$35 M	0.6%
Total	$6,079 M	100%

Category	Personnel	Ratio
Public Works, Transportation, and Commerce	8,798	31.5%
Public Protection	6,566	23.5%
Public Health	6,196	22.2%
General Administration and Finance	2,317	8.3%
Human Welfare and Neighborhood Development	2,125	7.6%
Culture and Recreation	1,883	6.8%
Total	27,885	100%

== Municipal law ==
The government of the City and County of San Francisco is defined by the Charter of the City and County of San Francisco, which is similar to the other counties of California. Pursuant to its charter, San Francisco causes to be published several codified version of its ordinances and regulations, the San Francisco Municipal Codes. Every act prohibited or declared unlawful, and every failure to perform an act required, by the ordinances are misdemeanor crimes, unless otherwise specified as infractions.

San Franciscans also make use of direct ballot initiatives to pass legislation.

San Francisco's municipal authority extends beyond city/county limits through its operation of the San Francisco International Airport and the vast tracts of land supporting the Hetch Hetchy Water System.

== Health Commission ==
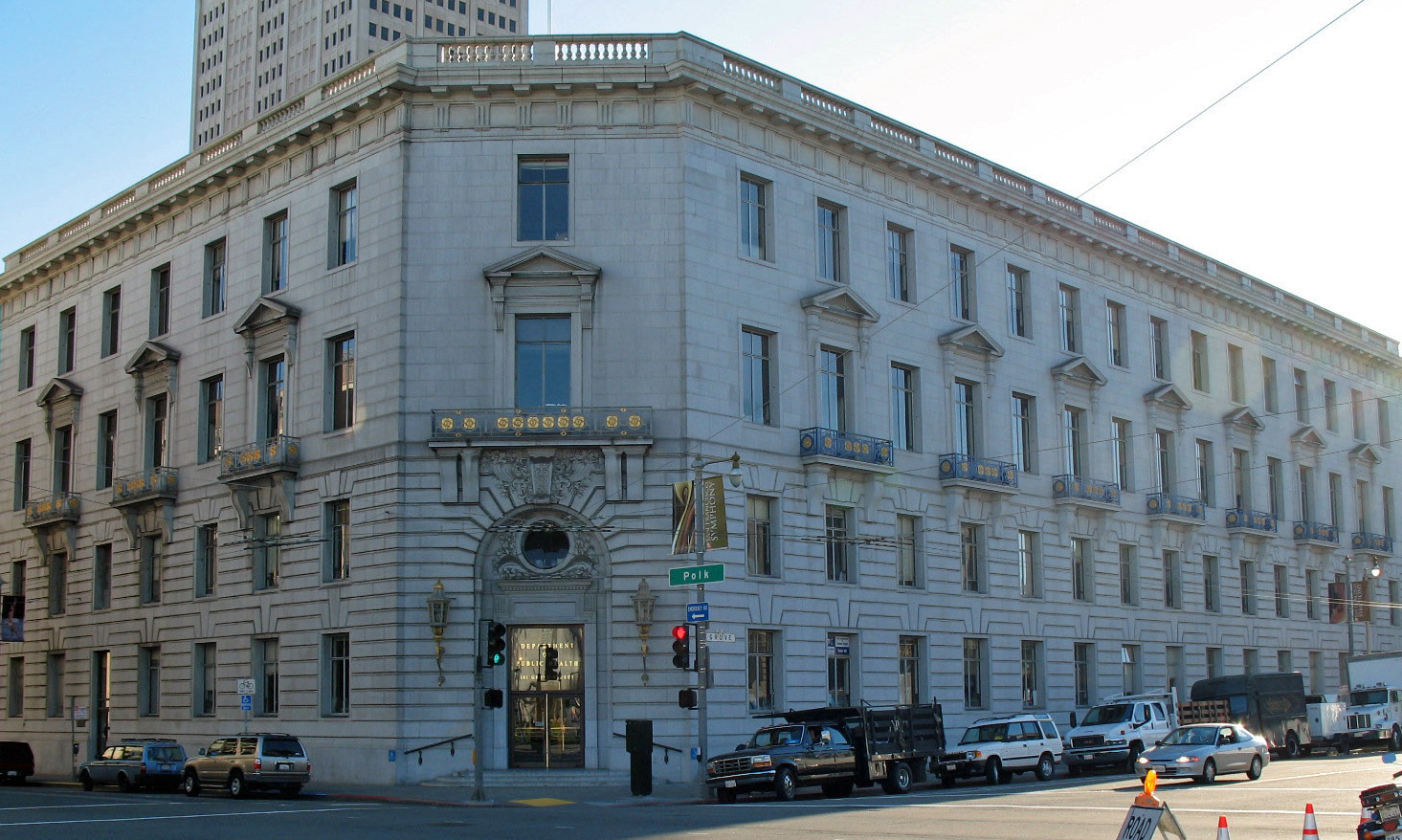
Department of Public Health

The Department of Public Health works through two Divisions of the government - the San Francisco Health Network and Population Health and Prevention. The San Francisco Health Networks includes the health system with locations at multiple hospitals and primary care centers. The Population Health and Prevention Division focuses on the communities in SF and consists of three branches - Community Health and Safety Branch, Community Health Promotion and Prevention Branch, and the Community Health Services Branch. On June 25, 2019, San Francisco become the first major US city to ban Electronic cigarettes.

=== San Francisco plague of 1900–1904 ===
In the 1890s San Francisco received heavy ship traffic from Asian cities that were currently dealing with the bubonic plague. In 1889, a ship from Hong Kong was found to have two cases of bubonic plague on board. The bodies washed up on the bay later, but no immediate outbreak occurred at this initial finding. In 1900 a city health officer autopsied a Chinese man and found evidence of the plague. With anti-Chinese feelings already running rampant throughout the city, the Department of Public Health quickly moved to quarantine Chinatown. Initially the quarantine was protested, not to protect the Chinese, but because of fear and doubt that the plague was indeed in the city. The mayor at the time, James D. Phelan, created the Board of Health, which included multiple doctors on the board. He demanded the Board of Health have 100 physicians search a 12-block area in Chinatown for more cases of the plague. After victims were found, the Board of Health publicly announced the plague, and the Chinatown quarantine was again set into place.

Health officials shut down Chinese-owned businesses, and any Chinese or Japanese people attempting to leave the city had to first go through an inoculation with an experimental prophylactic developed by Waldemar Haffkine. This led to a court case between Chinatown resident Wong Wai and the Department of Public Health. Wai won the court case and the Department of Public Health was ordered to stop the inoculations, but city officials got support from the Board of Supervisors to continue. Health authorities also attempted to set up a detention camp for those of Asian descent in Mission Rock, but the idea was protested and canceled, partially due to fear about openly admitting the plague in San Francisco.

Fear of the plague and prejudice against Chinese was so high that many city officials debated burning down Chinatown. The idea popular, especially since this had been done in Honolulu. To prevent their homes from being burnt down and break the quarantine, the Chinese rallied the Chinese Six Companies, multiple attorneys, and China's diplomat. Together, they were ultimately able to get the quarantine lifted again. This was again in part due to the government's fear of publicly confirming plague.

Health authorities from 21 states eventually passed a resolution about California's neglect of duties to address the plague in San Francisco and threatened to close all trade with California. San Francisco businessmen reacted by assembling the Chamber of Commerce, Board of Trade, Merchants' Association, Marine Hospital Service, new mayor George C. Pardee and various and civil rights groups to clear San Francisco of the plague.

== Education ==
There are several school districts that are co-extensive with San Francisco. The San Francisco Unified School District is governed by the elected seven-member San Francisco Board of Education. The community college district of the City College of San Francisco is governed by an elected seven-member Board of Trustees.

== Regional governments ==
In addition, several regional governmental units in San Francisco operate independently of the municipal government. Five regional agencies—the Association of Bay Area Governments, Metropolitan Transportation Commission, Bay Area Air Quality Management District, San Francisco Bay Regional Water Quality Control Board, and Bay Conservation and Development Commission—have jurisdiction over San Francisco and the other Bay Area counties, and San Francisco appoints representatives to their governing boards.

Several transit agencies provide transit service within San Francisco and adjacent counties, including the Bay Area Rapid Transit (BART), of which residents elect Board of Directors for districts 7, 8, and 9, Golden Gate Transit, Caltrain, the San Francisco Bay Area Water Emergency Transportation Authority, and the Metropolitan Transportation Commission.

== State and federal police agencies ==
Also notable are the independent police forces of the University of California, San Francisco and the Park Police of the Presidio Trust and the Golden Gate National Recreation Area.

== Political parties ==
=== Democratic Party ===
The San Francisco Democratic Central Committee (SFDCC), the governing body of the San Francisco Democratic Party, is a county central committee of the California Democratic Party for San Francisco. The SFDCC is elected from the two Assembly districts in San Francisco and consists of 24 members, with a 14/10 member split between the two Assembly districts based on number of registered Democrats.

=== Republican Party ===
The San Francisco Republican Executive Committee is the governing party of the San Francisco Republican Party. It is a county committee of the California Republican Party. The executive committee are elected every four years by party delegates from two Assembly districts.

=== Libertarian Party ===
Every member of the Libertarian Party of San Francisco, the county affiliate of the Libertarian Party of California, is automatically a member of the Central Committee. Four officers are elected from this Central Committee.

=== Green Party ===
The San Francisco Green Party, the county affiliate of the Green Party of California, elects a County Council of seven individuals every 2 years.

== See also ==
- Government of California
