= Jeff Adachi =

American civil rights lawyer (1959–2019)

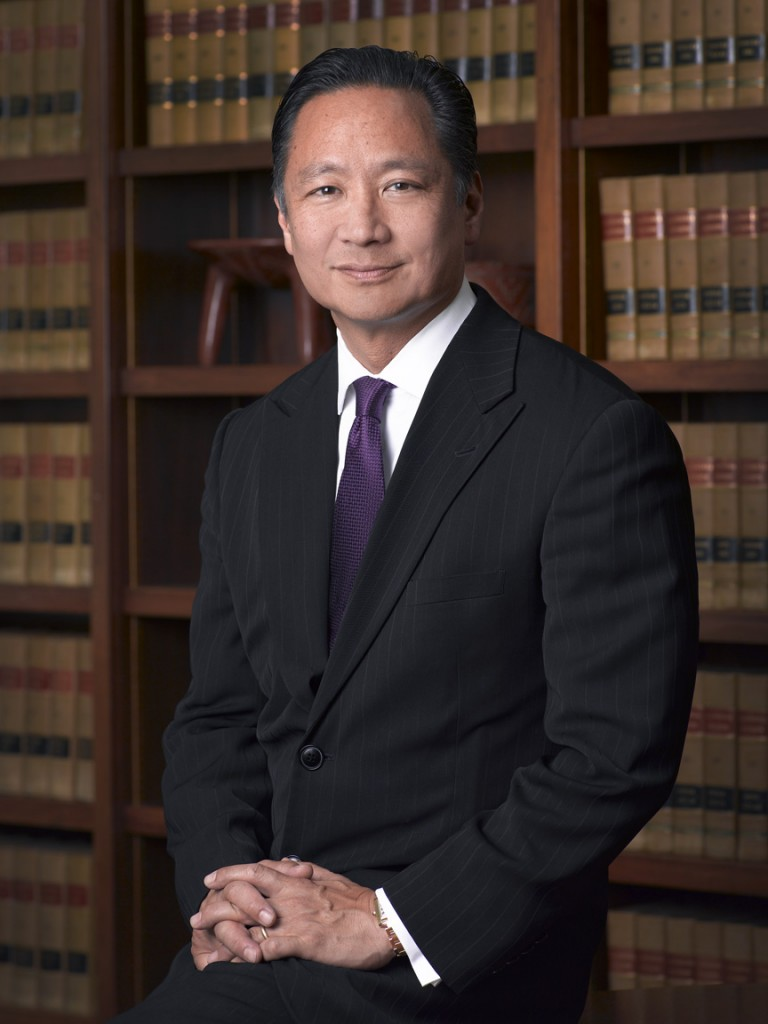

San Francisco Public Defender
- In office January 10, 2003 – February 22, 2019
- Preceded by: Kimiko Burton
- Succeeded by: Manohar Raju

Personal details
- Born: Jeffrey Gordon Adachi; August 29, 1959 Sacramento, California U.S.
- Died: February 22, 2019 (aged 59) San Francisco, California, U.S.
- Party: Democratic
- Spouse: Mutsuko Adachi
- Children: 1
- Education: University of California, Berkeley (BA); University of California, Hastings College of the Law (JD)
- Profession: Lawyer; Politician
- Jeff Adachi's voice Jeff Adachi on his career as the Public Defender of San Francisco; Recorded September 16, 2011

Jeffrey Gordon Adachi (August 29, 1959 – February 22, 2019) was an American attorney and politician who served as the Public Defender of San Francisco from 2003 to 2019.

== Early life and education ==
Adachi was the son of a Sacramento auto mechanic and a laboratory assistant. His parents and grandparents spent part of World War II in the Rohwer War Relocation Center in Arkansas. Adachi was a notably poor student at C. K. McClatchy High School accruing numerous absences due to the many hours he spent working at his part-time jobs. He attended Sacramento City College before transferring to the University of California, Berkeley where, in 1981, he received his bachelor’s degree. Adachi received his Juris Doctor from the Hastings College of the Law in 1985.

== Career ==
Adachi began his career as a deputy public defender with the San Francisco Public Defender's Office where he worked for thirty-two years. He ultimately rose to the rank of chief attorney of the office and served in that capacity for fifteen years. Adachi tried over one hundred jury trials and handled three thousand criminal matters during his career.

In 2001, Kimiko Burton-Cruz, the daughter of then State Senator John Burton, was appointed Public Defender by Mayor Willie Brown. On her first day after taking office, Burton-Cruz forced Adachi out, believed to be for political reasons. The following year, Adachi ran against Burton-Cruz for her position and defeated her by a 55%–45% margin. Afterward, Adachi was re-elected twice, both times running unopposed.

Adachi was featured in the 2002 PBS documentary Presumed Guilty, a film about the San Francisco Public Defender's Office, its difficult cases, and complex defense strategies.

Adachi was the only elected Public Defender in the state of California and ran an office of more than 100 attorneys and 60 staff members. The office's 2018–19 budget is $37.6 million. According to estimates, the office represented over 23,000 people each year who are charged with misdemeanor and felony offenses. The office was known for several innovative criminal justice programs including Drug Court, Clean Slate expungement services, and a full-service juvenile division. In 2017, Adachi launched an Immigration Unit to represent undocumented immigrants locked in detention facilities and facing deportation. It is the third jurisdiction to offer legal representation for immigrant detainees in removal proceedings. New York City and Alameda County have similar programs.

Adachi was a frequent police misconduct watchdog and bail reform advocate.

Adachi also played a significant role in drawing attention to serious problems within the California Youth Authority. He testified at state senate hearings and organized juveniles as part of a larger reform movement. Adachi also advocated for San Francisco to boycott sending juveniles to CYA facilities. In recognition of his dedication to reforming juvenile justice, SF Ordinance No. 181217, named after him, ensures that youths have legal rights protected during police interrogations.

=== Professional activities and recognition ===
Adachi was previously the president of the Asian American Bar Association of the Greater Bay Area and the San Francisco Japanese American Citizen's League, in addition to serving as a board member of the California Attorneys for Criminal Justice and the San Francisco Bar Association. At the national level, Adachi was a member of the American Bar Association's Standing Committee on Legal Aid and Indigents. Adachi served on the board of California Humanities until 2018 and as a board member of the National Association of Criminal Defense Lawyers and the National Association for Public Defense.

He was the author of a series of books on passing the bar exam, including the Bar Exam Survival Kit, Bar Breaker, the MBE Survival Kit and the First Year Law School Survival Kit. He was a BAR/BRI bar review professor for over 20 years.

In 1995, he founded the Asian American Arts Foundation to help emerging artists. The foundation and produced one of the first Asian American awards programs, the Golden Ring Awards, which honored artists such as Chow Yun-Fat, Joan Chen, Oliver Stone and John Woo. The foundation awarded over $100,000 in grants.

Adachi received several accolades for his tenure as Public Defender. In chronological order, Adachi received: the California State Bar Association's Hufstedler Award for public service; the Asian American Bar Association's Joe Morozumi Award for exceptional legal advocacy; the Mayor's Fiscal Advisory Committee's Managerial Excellence Award; the California Public Defender Association's Program of the Year Award; the American Bar Association's national award for excellence in public defense; and the California Lawyer Attorney of the Year award (CLAY) for his work in the field of prisoner reentry; the National Legal Aid and Defender Association's Reginald Heber Smith Award; Vanguard CourtWatch's Elected Official of the Year award; and the Elected Official Award for transparency from the Northern California chapter of the Society for Professional Journalists.

He became a Certified Specialist in Criminal Law (the State Bar of California Board of Legal Specialization) and a Certified Specialist in Criminal Trial Advocacy (National Board of Trial Advocacy).

=== Pension reform advocacy ===
In 2010, Adachi placed "Proposition B" on the ballot, which would have required employees to increase the level of their contribution to defray the cost of both their pension and health care benefits. Proposition B was defeated, having faced significant opposition from unions and elected officials.

In 2011, Adachi again placed a charter amendment on the ballot — "Proposition D" — which would require all employees to pay a base contribution rate towards their pension costs, require higher-earning employees to contribute an additional amount based on their salary level, cap the maximum size of pensions, and eliminate abusive and wasteful practices such as "pension spiking." In response to criticisms leveled at Proposition B, Adachi's new plan exempted the lowest-paid workers from any cost increases, used a progressive income scale to determine contributions, and did not require any health care contributions. According to the City Controller, Proposition D would save San Francisco as much as $142 million a year, and $1.6 billion over the next ten years.[3] Mayor Ed Lee offered a competing plan — "Proposition C" — which would similarly require employees to contribute at a higher level to their pensions, but also required contributions to cover health care costs. Proposition C was projected to save the city an estimated $1.29 billion over the next ten years.

His campaign was opposed by the police and firefighter unions, as his pension reform plan would require them to contribute more to their retirement pensions. When Adachi went to pay his respects at the June 2011 funeral services honoring San Francisco firefighters, Lt. Vincent Perez and Anthony Valerio who were killed in a house fire in San Francisco's Diamond Heights neighborhood, he was asked to leave by a firefighter. The Fire Chief was unaware that Adachi had been asked to leave and stated that everyone had the right to show their support and respect, and that she did not support the request to leave.

Voters approved Proposition C and defeated Proposition D.

=== San Francisco mayoral candidacy ===
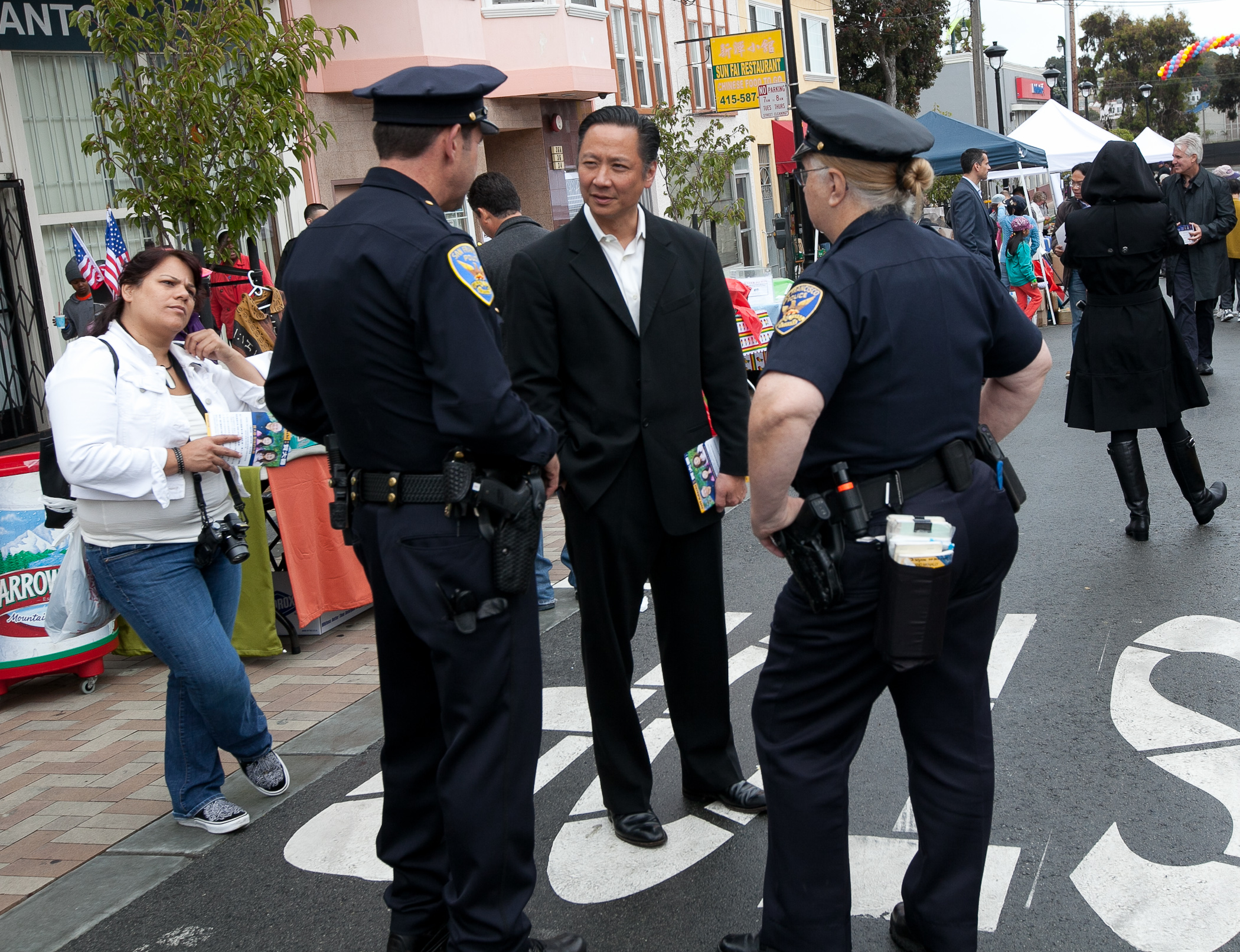
Adachi in 2011 as a mayoral candidate

In August 2011, Adachi formally entered the race for Mayor of San Francisco.

After filing his papers Adachi stated, "I've decided to run for Mayor of San Francisco to restore integrity and financial accountability to the city." He then added, "It wasn't until I really listened to what the candidates were saying in the last few debates about pension reform that I became convinced that either the candidates don't get it or they don't want to get it, and I want to make sure that there's a voice in there talking about the fiscal realities of this city." Adachi added, "This debate needs to be about what is best for the city, not about what is best for City Hall".

Adachi declined public financing under the City's new public financing law, stating that although he believes in public financing, he did not feel it was right to take the $900,000 that each candidate could receive "at a time that we are cutting summer school for 10,000 kids because we don't have $1 million to pay for it." However, Adachi agreed to abide by the voluntary spending limits contained in the new law.

In addition to restoring fiscal integrity to San Francisco through saving the City $1.7 billion over the next decade, Adachi proposed a job creation program by investing $40 million in micro-loans to small businesses, creating up to 15,000 new jobs and $1 billion of new economic activity. Adachi also proposed reforming the business tax through elimination of the current payroll tax system, which discourages hiring of new workers, and replacing it with a new business tax based upon net business revenue.

A cornerstone of Adachi's plan was improving education by providing additional funding from the City's reserve funds to restore summer school, which had been eliminated for the previous two years because of the City's fiscal crisis.

On October 12, 2011, the San Francisco Chronicle named Adachi one of the "3 S.F. Mayoral Candidates to Consider", stating: "Talk about courage. One of the city's most liberal politicians took on labor over the bedrock issue of pensions. He lost in his first attempt last year, but is back with a revised version after he wouldn't back a compromise measure also on the ballot. He's been unfairly vilified by much of the city's political establishment for daring to raise the pension problem that others preferred to ignore. His campaign shows he's more than a one-issue candidate. He has a clear grasp of a variety of issues ranging from homeless policies to taxes. His independence is unassailable." He placed 6th out of 16 candidates.

=== Film credits ===
Adachi wrote, produced, and directed The Slanted Screen, a 2006 documentary film about stereotypical depictions of Asian males in American cinema. The Slanted Screen won top awards at the New York International Independent Film & Video Festival and at the Berkeley Film Festival.

In 2009, he also directed You Don't Know Jack: The Jack Soo Story, about Jack Soo, a Japanese American actor (known for his role in Barney Miller) who took a Chinese name. The film won the best documentary film at the Accolade Film Festival, and was chosen to air on Comcast's on demand following its national PBS broadcast.

In 2016, he made the film America Needs a Racial Facial (initially entitled Racial Facial), an eight-minute history of racism in the U.S. Racial Facial won the best short documentary at the Hollywood Independent Documentary Film Festival awards in 2016 and earned a distribution deal by the Films for the Humanities and Sciences later that year.

Adachi's 2017 documentary Defender, co-directed with Jim Choi, won best documentary at the Independent Television Festival. The 70-minute piece followed a racially charged case tried by Adachi as well as a case handled by the office's fledgling immigration unit.

== Death ==
Adachi died on February 22, 2019, in the North Beach neighborhood of San Francisco. The San Francisco medical examiner investigated the death, led by Christopher Wirowek, whose credibility Adachi assailed publicly only three weeks before his death and who was later terminated because of his handling of Adachi's autopsy report. Though the autopsy report noted "trace" amounts of cocaine and alcohol in his system and claimed their effects on his already diseased heart was the cause of death

Dylan V. Miller, an expert in cardiovascular and autopsy pathology, Nikolas Lemos, a forensic toxicologist, and James L. Norris, a consultant in forensic science determined the sample used in the toxicology report relied upon by Wirowek was “unreliable” and that far from being the cause of death, the amounts of alcohol, cocaine, as well as benzodiazepines found in Adachi's system were “toxicologically insignificant.” Their independent autopsy concluded that Adachi's death was due to natural causes rather than an accident, specifically "sudden cardiac arrhythmia and acute myocardial infraction (sic) due to [a] coronary artery disease." This conclusion was supported by the president of the American Academy of Emergency Medicine, David Farcy, who reviewed Adachi’s autopsy at the request of a local news outlet.

Shortly after Adachi's death, the initial report regarding Adachi's death was leaked to journalist Bryan Carmody in violation of police department policy and laws governing release of confidential police reports. Carmody was later arrested and his home raided in a search for information surrounding the source of the leak. The raid prompted national outrage regarding constitutional rights violations surrounding freedom of the press. Chief of Police Bill Scott initially denied that any wrongdoing had taken place but eventually changed course and apologized for the raid, blaming "a lack of due diligence by department investigators" The Captain of Internal Affairs for the department retired soon after the raid and later defended his investigators, saying in essence that the arrest and raid were driven by and carried out at the direction of the Chief himself. Carmody sued the City and received $369,000 in an out of court settlement.
