= Jeff Knight (politician) =

American politician

Member of the Missouri House of Representatives from the 142nd district
- Incumbent
- Assumed office February 2018
- Preceded by: redistricting
- Succeeded by: Jeff Brown (elect)

Personal details
- Born: 1968 (age 57–58) Lebanon, Missouri, U.S.
- Party: Republican
- Education: Missouri State University (BS)

Jeff Knight (born 1968) is an American politician serving as a member of the Missouri House of Representatives from the 142nd district. He assumed office in February 2018.

== Early life and education ==
Knight was born and raised in Lebanon, Missouri. He attended the University of Missouri and earned a Bachelor of Science degree in science education from Southwest Missouri State University.

== Career ==
After graduating from college, Knight worked as a teacher and coach in the Ozark School District, Nixa Public Schools, Lebanon School District, and Camdenton School District for a combined 25 years. He has since worked as an auctioneer. Knight was elected to the Missouri House of Representatives in a February 2018 special election.
