= Geoffrey F. Brown =

American lawyer

San Francisco Public Defender
- In office 1978–2001
- Succeeded by: Kimiko Burton

Personal details
- Born: Geoffrey Francis Brown; May 20, 1943 (age 83) San Francisco, California
- Party: Democratic
- Relations: Edmund G. Brown, Sr. (uncle); Edmund G. Brown, Jr. (cousin); Kathleen Brown (cousin)
- Children: 3
- Education: University of California, Berkeley (B.A.); San Francisco Law School (J.D.)
- Profession: Lawyer; Politician

Geoffrey Francis Brown (born May 20, 1943), known as Jeff Brown, is an American attorney and retired government official. From 2001 to 2007, Brown served as a member of the California Public Utilities Commission.

== Early life and education ==
Brown was born May 20, 1943, in San Francisco, California, and attended schools in both San Francisco and Marin County. Brown is the nephew of former Governor Pat Brown and the cousin of former Governor Jerry Brown and former State Treasurer Kathleen Brown.

Brown received his bachelor's degree from the University of California, Berkeley in 1964, and graduated from San Francisco Law School in 1970. He served two stints in the U.S. Air Force (1965 and 1968–1969) as an enlisted man.

== Career ==
Brown was admitted to the bar in January 1971 and practiced with his father until joining the San Francisco Public Defender's Office in October 1971. In 1978 he was elected Public Defender of San Francisco and was re-elected five times. During Brown's tenure, the Public Defender's Office grew to a staff of 83 attorneys and 40 support personnel. Brown was succeeded in his position by Kimiko Burton, the daughter of John Burton.

Brown was appointed by Governor Gray Davis in January 2001 as a Commissioner of the California Public Utilities Commission and confirmed in March by the State Senate. His term expired in January 2007 after which he joined the John F. Kennedy University College of Law, teaching Criminal Law, Criminal Procedure, and Evidence. He was, for a time, a member of faculty at the Hastings College of Law but as of December 2022, he is no longer listed in their faculty directory.

== Personal life ==
A widower, he has three grown daughters, Miranda, Simone and Olivia.
