= Manohar Raju =

American attorney

Manohar "Mano" Raju
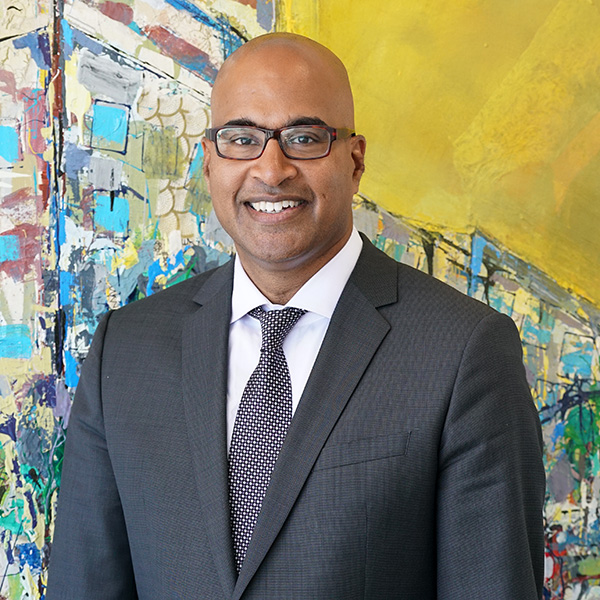
- Official portrait, 2019

San Francisco Public Defender
- Incumbent
- Assumed office March 11, 2019
- Preceded by: Jeff Adachi

Personal details
- Born: Wilmington, Delaware, U.S.
- Party: Democratic
- Education: Columbia University (BA); University of California, Berkeley (JD, MA)
- Profession: Lawyer; Politician

Manohar Raju is an American attorney who has served as Public Defender of San Francisco since 2019. Appointed by Mayor London Breed to replace the late Jeff Adachi, Manohar "Mano" Raju previously served as Deputy Public Defender, and managed the office's Felony Division.

Raju has been described as a supporter of criminal justice reform and decarceral policies.

== Early life and education ==
Raju was born in Wilmington, Delaware to parents from Allinagaram, Tamil Nadu, India. His father, Palanichamy Pillai Raj, was an engineer, and his mother, Dhanam, worked in skincare. Raju was raised in Pittsburgh, Pennsylvania and Boston, Massachusetts.

Raju attended Columbia University, where he received his undergraduate degree. While at Columbia, he was a research assistant for Kendall Thomas, who Raju described as "one of the founding scholars of Critical Race Theory." He later attended the University of California, Berkeley, where he received his J.D. and a master's degree in South Asian Studies.

== Early career ==
Raju worked for seven years as a public defender in Contra Costa County before joining the San Francisco Public Defender's office in 2008. Raju was a founding member of Public Defenders for Racial Justice.

As manager of the office's felony unit, Raju criticized the lack of representation in jury pools, noting in 2017 that:

"It’s not uncommon that you’ll walk into a felony trial with an African American client and turn around and see anywhere from zero to maybe three African Americans in the whole jury pool"

== Public Defender of San Francisco (2019-present) ==
Following Jeff Adachi's death in 2019, Raju was appointed Public Defender of San Francisco by Mayor London Breed. Matt Gonzalez, who briefly served as acting Public Defender in Adachi's place, praised the appointment of Raju, stating "If I could have made the choice on my own, I would have chosen him."

Raju was elected to a full term in office in the November 2019 without opposition. In 2022, Raju faced a challenge from Rebecca Young, an assistant district attorney and former deputy public defender who previously served under Raju. In the first contested race for the position in 20 years, Raju comfortably won reelection with 69.75% of the vote per provisional totals.

=== Tenure ===
Following the outbreak of the COVID-19 pandemic, Raju pushed for the release of pre-trial defendants deemed at a heightened risk from the virus from county jails. In 2021, Raju sued the San Francisco County Superior Court over the continued imprisonment of inmates past their trial deadlines. During his tenure, Raju has endorsed efforts to improve pay for individuals serving jury duty.

As Public Defender, Raju has identified curbing the "macho" atmosphere in the office and prioritizing diversity in the ranks as priorities. On matters of criminal justice reform, Raju favors the creation of an integrity unit within the office to investigate potentially unfair convictions. Raju was among the public officials to criticize Mayor London Breed's declaration of a state of emergency in the Tenderloin neighborhood, arguing that incarcerating homeless residents and individuals with substance abuse disorder would not solve problems facing the community.

Following Xavier Becerra's resignation as Attorney General of California, Raju co-authored an op-ed calling for Assemblyman Ash Kalra to replace him. Following Brooke Jenkins' accession to the position of District Attorney, Raju criticized Jenkins' support for expanding cash bail, arguing that "[p]re-trial detention is a coercive tactic used to pressure people who can not afford to pay bail to take a plea deal for a crime they did not commit." In the 2022 special election for District Attorney, Raju endorsed Jenkins' unsuccessful opponent John Hamasaki.

In May 2025, Raju announced that his office would decline new clients on one business day per week due to an overload of cases caused by increased arrests and budget cuts mandated by Mayor Daniel Lurie. Matt Gonzalez, his chief attorney, wrote a letter to Superior Court Presiding Judge Rochelle C. East declaring the office "unavailable," citing the fact that there were 200 more arraignments in the first four months of 2025 than in the same period in 2024.

== Personal life ==
Raju is married to Asha Mehta, with whom he has one son. Regarding his position, Raju said he views "public defender work as falling within the tradition of broader freedom struggles that have always relied upon multiracial solidarities", and cited the activism of Bayard Rustin and Ram Manohar Lohia.
