= Phillip Burton =

American politician (1926–1983)

Phil Burton
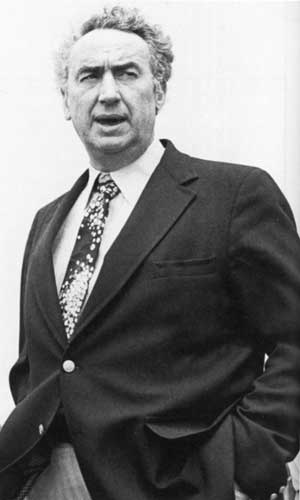

Chair of the House Democratic Caucus
- In office January 3, 1975 – January 3, 1977
- Leader: Carl Albert
- Preceded by: Olin Teague
- Succeeded by: Tom Foley

Member of the U.S. House of Representatives from California
- In office February 18, 1964 – April 10, 1983
- Preceded by: John F. Shelley
- Succeeded by: Sala Burton
- Constituency: 5th district (1964–1975, 1983); 6th district (1975–1983)

Member of the California State Assembly from the 20th district
- In office January 7, 1957 – February 24, 1964
- Preceded by: Thomas A. Maloney
- Succeeded by: John Burton

Personal details
- Born: June 1, 1926 Cincinnati, Ohio, U.S.
- Died: April 10, 1983 (aged 56) San Francisco, California, U.S.
- Resting place: Presidio of San Francisco
- Party: Democratic
- Spouse: Sala Lipschultz
- Relatives: John Burton (brother); Kimiko Burton (niece)
- Education: University of Southern California (BA); Golden Gate University (LLB)

Phillip Burton (June 1, 1926 – April 10, 1983) was an American politician who served in the United States House of Representatives from California from 1964 until his death in 1983. He was a member of the Democratic Party and represented California's 5th congressional district.

During his time in Congress, Burton was known for his liberal views and his strong support for civil rights, environmental protection, and social welfare programs. He was a key author of the Education for All Handicapped Children Act, which later became the Individuals with Disabilities Education Act (IDEA), and he worked to expand access to healthcare and education for all Americans.

Burton was also a strong advocate for environmental protection, and he played a key role in the creation of the Golden Gate National Recreation Area in California. He was also involved in the establishment of the Point Reyes National Seashore, a protected area of coastline and wilderness in Northern California.

In addition to his work in Congress, Burton was also a powerful figure in California politics, and he played a key role in shaping the state's Democratic Party. He was known for his ability to build coalitions and get things done, and he was respected by both his colleagues in Congress and his constituents in California.

Burton died in 1983 at the age of 56, and he was succeeded in Congress by his wife, Sala Burton, who served until her own death in 1987.

== Early years and education ==
Burton was born in Cincinnati, Ohio, the son of Mildred (Leonard) and Thomas Burton, who was a salesman and physician. He attended Washington High School in Milwaukee, Wisconsin, and graduated from George Washington High School, in the Richmond District of San Francisco, in 1944. He earned a B.A. in political science from the University of Southern California in 1947 and an LL.B. from Golden Gate College School of Law in 1952.

== Career ==
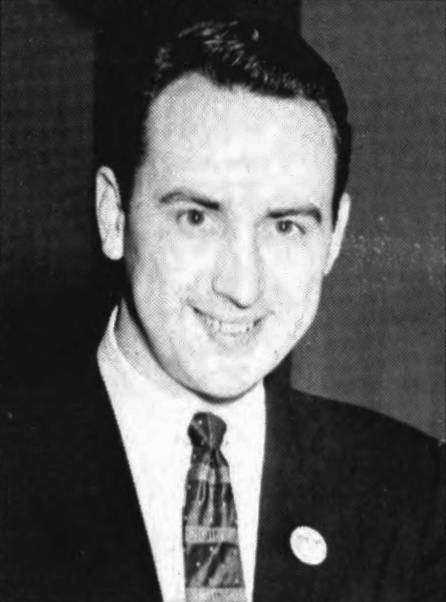
Burton in the Assembly

Burton worked as a lawyer and was admitted to practice before the United States Supreme Court in 1956. He was a member of the United States Air Force during both World War II and the Korean War.

Burton was elected to the California State Assembly in November 1956, and served there from 1957 to 1964. In 1959 he represented the United States at the Atlantic Treaty Association Conference in France.

=== U.S. Congress ===
Burton, as a Democrat, won a special election in February 1964 to fill the U.S. House of Representatives vacancy caused by the resignation of John F. Shelley, who was elected mayor of San Francisco. Burton was reelected to the ten succeeding Congresses (February 18, 1964 – April 10, 1983). In 1965, Burton was one of only three members of the House to vote against appropriations that President Lyndon B. Johnson requested for the Vietnam War.

Burton was a delegate to the California State Democratic convention from 1968 to 1982. He was also a delegate to the Democratic National Convention in 1968 and 1972. At the 1968 convention, he was a part of the delegation pledged to Robert F. Kennedy, who was assassinated after winning the California Democratic primary in June.

In 1973, Burton allowed a bill to go to the floor without a "closed rule"—a stipulation that there could be no amendments proposed to it—for the first time since the 1920s. The ending of the closed rule created an infusion of federal lobbyists at the Capitol building; the lobbyists targeted members of Congress to add funding for lobbyists' favorite projects into bills. For this reason, David Frum wrote that Burton "created the modern Congress" more than anyone else.

After the Democrats gained a strong majority in 1974, he was successful in getting the House to abolish the House Un-American Activities Committee. Burton was supported by labor unions and championed union activists, supporting the activities of the farm workers union and the coal miners union. Burton voted in favor of the Civil Rights Acts of 1964, Civil Rights Act of 1968, and the Voting Rights Act of 1965.

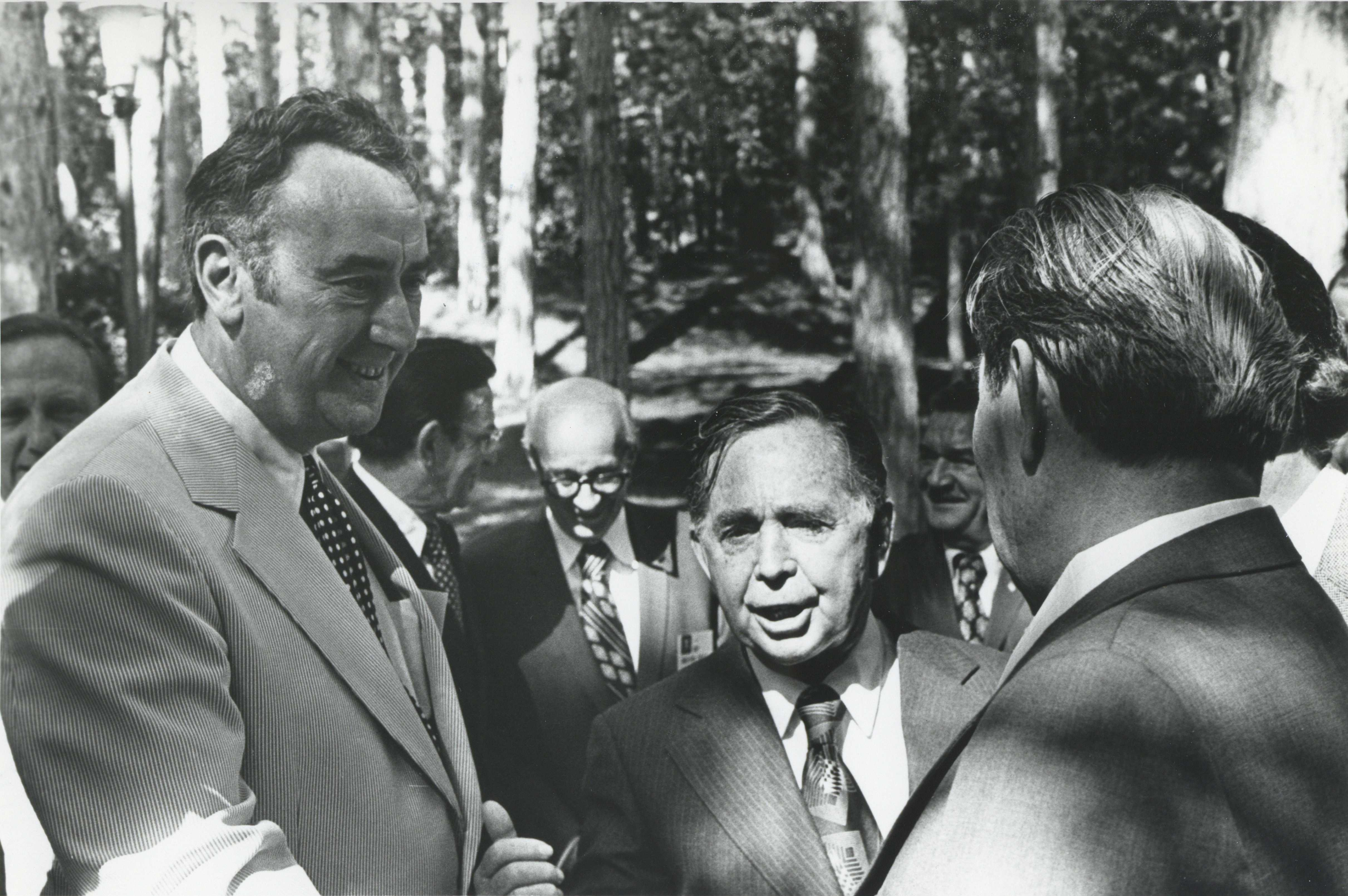
Phillip Burton shaking hands with Soviet Union General Secretary Leonid Brezhnev (right), with Speaker Carl Albert (middle) in 1975.

When President Gerald Ford appeared before Congress in 1975 to request aid during a refugee crisis in the Vietnamese and Cambodian capitals, Burton became so upset with Ford's request that he called it "an outrage" and left halfway through the speech. In December 1976, Burton narrowly lost a bid for House Majority Leader to Jim Wright of Fort Worth, Texas, by a vote of 148 to 147.

He was the author of the bill that created the Golden Gate National Recreation Area and legislation setting up wilderness areas across the country. He sponsored a law that substantially enlarged Redwood National Park in 1987. The Point Reyes National Seashore includes the Phillip Burton Wilderness, named for the congressman in 1985. In the early 1980s, he worked with gay liaison Bill Kraus to create legislation and funding for AIDS research in the San Francisco area. He also was instrumental in establishing the position of non-voting representative from Guam, the Virgin Islands, and American Samoa.

Before 1976, Phil Burton encouraged Nancy Pelosi to hold political fundraisers at the San Francisco mansion she shared with her husband, investor Paul Pelosi. In 1976, she was elected as a member of the Democratic National Committee, later chair of the Northern California Democratic Party and then the statewide Democratic Party, and in 1985, bidding for DNC chair.

== Death and legacy ==
Burton died on April 10, 1983, in San Francisco at age 56, of a ruptured abdominal aortic aneurysm. He was cremated, and the ashes were interred in the National Cemetery of the Presidio of San Francisco. His wife Sala Burton won a special election in June 1983 to serve the remainder of his term. She was elected to full terms in 1984 and 1986. Burton's House seat was later held by Nancy Pelosi, who won a special election in 1987, following Sala Burton's death.

There is a statue of Burton at the Great Meadow at Fort Mason, in the Golden Gate Recreation Area. San Francisco's federal building is named for Burton. Phillip & Sala Burton High School, in San Francisco on the site of the former Woodrow Wilson High School, is named for Burton and his wife.

== In popular culture ==
He was portrayed by Dakin Matthews in HBO's 1993 film And the Band Played On and by Robert Chimento in the 2008 film Milk.

== Electoral history ==
1964 United States House of Representatives elections in California
Party	Candidate	Votes	%
Democratic	Phillip Burton (Incumbent)	71,638	100.0
Turnout			
Democratic hold			

1966 United States House of Representatives elections in California
Party	Candidate	Votes	%
Democratic	Phillip Burton (Incumbent)	56,476	71.3
Republican	Terry R. Macken	22,778	28.7
Total votes		79,254	100.0
Turnout			
Democratic hold			

1968 United States House of Representatives elections in California
Party	Candidate	Votes	%
Democratic	Phillip Burton (Incumbent)	86,647	72.0
Republican	Waldo Velasquez	29,123	24.2
Peace and Freedom	Marvin Garson	4,549	3.8
Total votes		120,319	100.0
Turnout			
Democratic hold			

1970 United States House of Representatives elections in California
Party	Candidate	Votes	%
Democratic	Phillip Burton (Incumbent)	76,567	70.8
Republican	John E. Parks	31,570	29.2
Total votes		108,137	100.0
Turnout			
Democratic hold			

1972 United States House of Representatives elections in California
Party	Candidate	Votes	%
Democratic	Phillip Burton (Incumbent)	120,819	81.8
Republican	Edlo E. Powell	26,963	18.2
Total votes		147,782	100.0
Turnout			
Democratic hold			

1974 United States House of Representatives elections
Party	Candidate	Votes	%
Democratic	Phillip Burton	84,585	71.3
Republican	Tom Spinosa	25,721	21.7
Peace and Freedom	Emily Siegel	4,753	4.0
American Independent	Carl Richard Davis	3,456	2.9
Total votes		118,515	100.0
Democratic hold			

1976 United States House of Representatives elections
Party	Candidate	Votes	%
Democratic	Phillip Burton (Incumbent)	86,493	66.1
Republican	Tom Spinosa	35,359	27.0
Peace and Freedom	Emily Siegel	6,570	5.0
American Independent	Raymond O. Heaps	2,494	1.9
Total votes		130,916	100.0
Democratic hold			

1978 United States House of Representatives elections
Party	Candidate	Votes	%
Democratic	Phillip Burton (Incumbent)	81,801	68.3
Republican	Tom Spinosa	33,515	27.9
American Independent	Raymond O. Heaps	4,452	3.7
Total votes		119,768	100.0
Democratic hold			

1980 United States House of Representatives elections
Party	Candidate	Votes	%
Democratic	Phillip Burton (Incumbent)	93,400	69.3
Republican	Tom Spinosa	34,500	25.6
Libertarian	Roy Childs	6,750	5.0
Total votes		134,650	100.0
Democratic hold			

1982 United States House of Representatives elections in California
Party	Candidate	Votes	%
Democratic	Phillip Burton (Incumbent)	103,268	50.5
Republican	Milton Marks	72,139	35.3
Libertarian	Justin Raimondo	2,904	14.2
Total votes		178,311	100.0
Turnout			
Democratic hold			

== See also ==
- List of members of the United States Congress who died in office (1950–1999)

U.S. House of Representatives
Preceded by John F. Shelley	Member of the U.S. House of Representatives from California's 5th congressional district 1964–1975	Succeeded by John Burton
Preceded by John Burton	Member of the U.S. House of Representatives from California's 6th congressional district 1975–1983	Succeeded by Barbara Boxer
Preceded by Olin Teague	Chair of the House Democratic Caucus; 1975–1977	Succeeded by Tom Foley
Preceded by John Burton	Member of the U.S. House of Representatives from California's 5th congressional district 1983	Succeeded by Sala Burton
