= Jeff Brown (Missouri politician) =

American politician

Member-elect of the Missouri House of Representatives from the 142nd district
- Assuming office January 6, 2027
- Succeeding: Jeff Knight

Personal details
- Party: Republican
- Website: Campaign website

Jeff Brown is an American politician of the Missouri Republican Party who is the representative-elect for the 142nd district in the Missouri House of Representatives. He was elected in the 2026 general election.
