= John Burton (American politician) =

American politician (1932–2025)

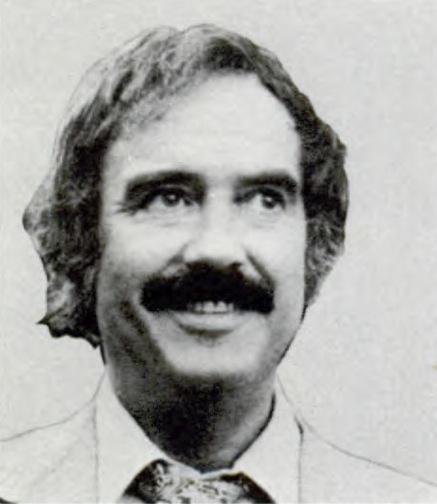
- Burton in 1977

Chair of the California Democratic Party
- In office April 13, 2009 – May 20, 2017
- Preceded by: Art Torres
- Succeeded by: Eric C. Bauman
- In office 1973–1974
- Preceded by: Charles Manatt
- Succeeded by: Bert Coffey

47th President pro tempore of the California Senate
- In office February 5, 1998 – November 30, 2004
- Preceded by: Bill Lockyer
- Succeeded by: Don Perata

Member of the California State Senate from the 3rd district
- In office December 2, 1996 – December 6, 2004
- Preceded by: Milton Marks
- Succeeded by: Carole Migden

Member of the California State Assembly
- In office April 14, 1988 – December 2, 1996
- Preceded by: Art Agnos
- Succeeded by: Kevin Shelley
- Constituency: 16th district (1988–1992); 12th district (1992–1996)
- In office January 4, 1965 – June 4, 1974
- Preceded by: Phillip Burton
- Succeeded by: Dixon Arnett
- Constituency: 20th district

Member of the U.S. House of Representatives from California
- In office June 4, 1974 – January 3, 1983
- Preceded by: William S. Mailliard
- Succeeded by: Barbara Boxer
- Constituency: 6th district (1974–1975); 5th district (1975–1983)

Personal details
- Born: John Lowell Burton; December 15, 1932 Cincinnati, Ohio, U.S.
- Died: September 7, 2025 (aged 92) San Francisco, California, U.S.
- Party: Democratic
- Spouses: Michele Hall (divorced); Sharon Bain (divorced)
- Children: Kimiko Burton (daughter)
- Relatives: Phillip Burton (brother); Sala Burton (sister-in-law)
- Education: San Francisco State College (BA); University of San Francisco (JD)

Military service
- Allegiance: United States
- Branch: United States Army
- Service years: 1954–1956

John Lowell Burton (December 15, 1932 – September 7, 2025) was an American politician who served as chair of the California Democratic Party. He had also served in both houses of the California State Legislature and the United States House of Representatives, representing San Francisco-based districts.

Born in Cincinnati, Burton was raised in San Francisco, where he went to college and worked as an attorney and lobbyist. He served in the California State Assembly from 1965 to 1974 and as chair of the California Democratic Party from 1973 to 1974. He was elected to the U.S. House of Representatives in 1974 and served until 1983, during which time he was a strong advocate for civil rights, environmental protection, and healthcare reform. He co-authored the Comprehensive Anti-Apartheid Act of 1986, which imposed economic sanctions on South Africa in protest of its system of racial segregation known as apartheid.

In 1988, Burton was elected to the California State Assembly again. He served until he was term-limited in 1996 and was elected to the California State Senate, serving until being term-limited again in 2004. During his time in the Legislature, he championed progressive causes such as expanding access to healthcare, protecting the environment, and advancing civil rights. He served as the 47th president pro tempore of the California State Senate from 1998 to 2004.

After leaving the Legislature, Burton continued his involvement in politics and advocacy. He served a second stint as chair of the California Democratic Party from 2009 to 2017. In 2020, Mayor London Breed appointed Burton to the San Francisco Port Commission, which he helped create as a state assemblymember in 1968. He served on the Port Commission until his retirement in 2023.

Burton was also known for his charity work. In 2005, he established the John Burton Foundation for Children Without Homes, which works to improve the lives of foster children in California. Throughout his career, Burton had been recognized for his contributions to public service and advocacy, receiving numerous awards and honors.

== Early life and education ==
Burton was born in Cincinnati, Ohio, on December 15, 1932. The son of Mildred (Leonard) and Thomas Burton, a salesman and physician, he was raised in San Francisco with his brother Phillip. He graduated from Abraham Lincoln High School in 1950.

Burton earned a Bachelor of Arts in social science from San Francisco State University (then San Francisco State College) in 1954. After college, he enlisted in the United States Army, serving from 1954 to 1956. Burton later earned a Juris Doctor from the University of San Francisco School of Law in 1960.

== Political career ==
Burton was admitted to the California bar in 1961. He worked as an attorney in San Francisco and as a lobbyist for Pacific Gas and Electric Company (PG&E). Burton often protested the Vietnam War prior to its escalation. He was elected to the California State Assembly in 1964 to succeed his brother Phillip, representing a San Francisco-based district and serving until 1974. Burton also served as chair of the California Democratic Party from 1973 to 1974.

=== U.S. House of Representatives ===
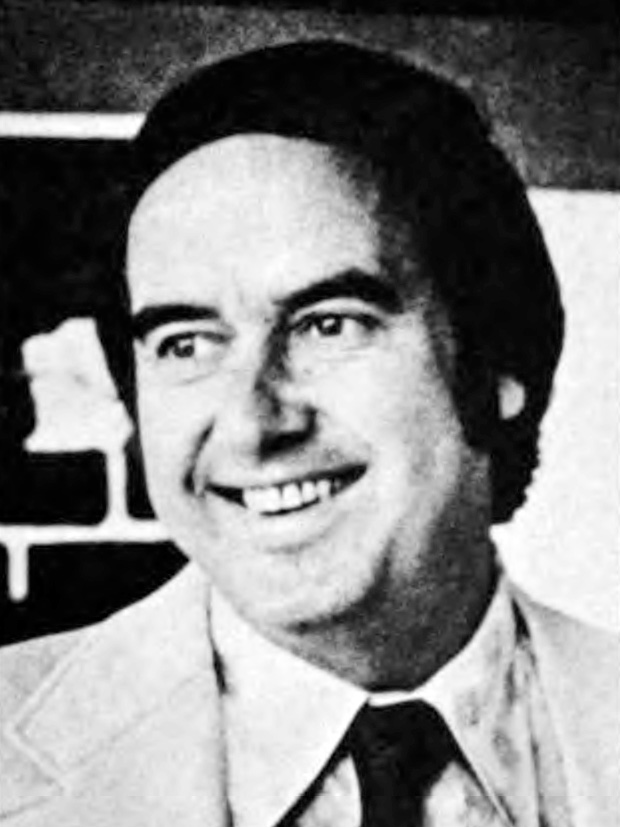
Burton in his first term as a U.S. Congressman, 1975.

Following the release of the 1970 Census, Burton and his brother Phillip, then a San Francisco-based congressman, were tasked with drawing boundaries for the state's congressional districts. Burton was elected to the U.S. House of Representatives in a 1974 special election following the resignation of Rep. William S. Mailliard. As a congressman, Burton was a staunch advocate for civil rights and environmental protection and worked to sanction South Africa for apartheid.

Burton decided not to seek reelection to Congress in 1982, due to addictions to crack cocaine and nitrous oxide. Prior to this decision, a new district had been gerrymandered expressly for him from parts of San Francisco and Marin counties in the redistricting for that year's election, which Barbara Boxer won. He served in Congress with his older brother Phillip, to whom this redistricting then reassigned much of his former district; Phillip died of a heart attack in 1983 and was succeeded by his widow, Sala Burton, who in turn was succeeded by Nancy Pelosi following Sala's death from cancer in 1987. John Burton chaired Pelosi's first congressional campaign.

=== California State Legislature ===
Burton returned to the Assembly in a 1988 special election to succeed Art Agnos, who had been elected Mayor of San Francisco. Burton then won a full term that fall and was re-elected in 1990, at which time California voters passed term limits restricting Assembly members to three full terms (and state senators to two full terms) from then on. The Los Angeles Times reported of Burton, "After quitting Congress in 1982, Burton cleaned himself up in a rehabilitation center and spent nearly six years in private law practice before in 1988 returning to where he started in elective office, the California Assembly."

Burton served in the Assembly until he reached his term limits in 1996. He was then elected to the California State Senate in 1996 and served until he reached his term limit there in 2004. Burton served as the 47th president pro tempore of the California State Senate from 1998 to 2004.

As a state legislator, Burton was known for expanding the Cal Grant scholarship program and passing a law (subsequently defeated in a referendum) that would have required California businesses to pay for health coverage for their workers. The magazine California Journal said about Burton's departure from the Senate in 2004: "Gone will be the Senate's most vehement partisan for social services for the poor, the Senate's angriest voice against tax breaks for businesses and the wealthy, its loudest voice for protection of workers, its fiercest pro-labor advocate and its disciplinarian."

== Later career ==
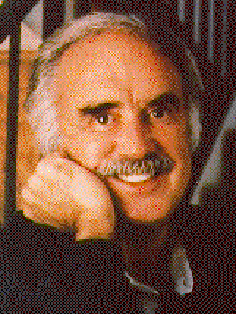
Burton's official portrait during his California State Senate tenure, 1997.

After leaving the Senate, Burton formed the John Burton Foundation in 2005. According to its website, the organization was "dedicated to improving the quality of life for California’s homeless children and developing policy solutions to prevent homelessness." In February 2007, he was appointed to the governing board of the University of Phoenix.

=== Sexual harassment allegation ===
In 2008, Burton settled a lawsuit alleging sexual harassment filed by Kathleen Driscoll, then the executive director of his charitable foundation. She claimed Burton sexually harassed her by making unwanted advances, suggestively raising his eyebrows, and commenting on her body. At a 2008 news conference in her attorney's office, Driscoll said, "I had a dream of helping homeless children through a job I loved. John Burton turned that dream into a sexual harassment nightmare and quite frankly a living hell." Burton's attorney, Susan Rubenstein, countered, saying, "John Burton has dedicated approximately a half-century of his life to public service, and if he were a sexual harasser, I think it would have been unearthed by now. I think the allegations are shocking and a shakedown and are absolutely meritless." Within hours Rubenstein received information that Driscoll had written or said complimentary things about Burton that contradicted her allegations. In a June 2007 email to another foundation employee, Driscoll had written, "I love John because his heart is so good and pure." Rubenstein continued, "I just got off the phone with another [person] who felt compelled to tell me that she had lunch with Driscoll and she said Driscoll had nothing but admirable things to say about Mr. Burton."

=== California Democratic Party chair ===
On April 26, 2009, Burton was elected chair of the California Democratic Party, succeeding Art Torres. He received roughly 76% of the vote over his sole challenger, Chris Finnie of Santa Cruz. Burton had previously served as party chair from 1973 to 1974.

Burton stepped down from the party chairmanship in May 2017 and was succeeded by vice chairman Eric Bauman. At his farewell, he recalled a lesson learned early in life. Nearly in tears, he described walking in San Francisco with his father, who doled out whatever money he had to the poor. When John asked why, Burton recalled, "He put his finger in my face and told me he never ever wanted me to walk past some guy in bad circumstances without leaving something in the cup." Burton continued, "That's what Democrats do. …There’s a lot of people out there that if we don’t fight for them, nobody’s going to fight for them because they don’t have any power."

After promoting expanded medical care for Californians, he was extolled in a video and by a long line of effusive party luminaries. He was applauded for his decades-long leadership, leading protests against the Vietnam War, his support of Central Valley farmworkers, the homeless, and the needy. He finally ended his comments by raising both middle fingers and saying, "Fuck [Donald] Trump," to loud applause.

=== San Francisco Port Commission ===
Burton was appointed to the San Francisco Port Commission by Mayor London Breed on October 22, 2020. He served until his retirement on January 24, 2023. Burton had contributed to the creation of the San Francisco Port Commission as a state assemblymember in 1968.

== Personal life ==
Burton's first marriage was to Michele (née Hall) Burton, daughter of Jack Hall, a Hawaiian trade unionist and healthcare consultant. Their daughter, Kimiko Burton, served as San Francisco Public Defender from 2001 to 2003, and as a member of the California State Personnel Board from 2012 to June 2025. After his first marriage ended in divorce, he married Sharon Bain. They later divorced.

=== Death ===
Burton died at a hospice facility in San Francisco on September 7, 2025, at the age of 92, from complications of a fall.

== Federal electoral history ==
1974 Special election
Party	Candidate	Votes	%
Democratic	John Burton		50.0
Republican	Thomas Caylor		21.1
Democratic	Terrence "T.V." McGuire		8.7
Republican	Jean Wall		5.8
Republican	Sean McCarthy		5.3
Democratic	Alan F. Reeves		4.1
Republican	Wesley Wilkes		2.7
Democratic	Leslie Alan Grant		2.1
Total votes			100.0
Democratic gain from Republican			

1974 United States House of Representatives elections in California
Party	Candidate	Votes	%
Democratic	John Burton (Incumbent)	87,323	59.6
Republican	Thomas Caylor	55,881	37.7
Peace and Freedom	Raymond Broshears	3,999	2.7
Total votes		147,203	100.0
Turnout			
Democratic hold			

1976 United States House of Representatives elections in California
Party	Candidate	Votes	%
Democratic	John Burton (Incumbent)	103,746	61.8
Republican	Branwell Fanning	64,008	38.2
Total votes		167,754	100.0
Turnout			
Democratic hold			

1978 United States House of Representatives elections in California
Party	Candidate	Votes	%
Democratic	John Burton (Incumbent)	106,046	66.8
Republican	Dolores Skore	52,603	33.2
Total votes		158,649	100.0
Turnout			
Democratic hold			

1980 United States House of Representatives elections in California
Party	Candidate	Votes	%
Democratic	John Burton (Incumbent)	101,105	51.1
Republican	Dennis McQuaid	89,624	45.3
Libertarian	Dan P. Dougherty	7,092	3.6
Total votes		197,821	100.0
Turnout			
Democratic hold			

Party political offices
Preceded by Charles Manatt	Chair of the California Democratic Party; 1973–1974	Succeeded by Bert Coffey
Preceded by Art Torres	Chair of the California Democratic Party; 2009–2017	Succeeded by Eric C. Bauman
U.S. House of Representatives
Preceded by William S. Mailliard	Member of the U.S. House of Representatives from California's 6th congressional district 1974–1975	Succeeded by Phillip Burton
Preceded by Phillip Burton	Member of the U.S. House of Representatives from California's 5th congressional district 1975–1983	Succeeded by Phillip Burton
California Senate
Preceded by Bill Lockyer	President pro tempore of the California Senate; 1998–2004	Succeeded by Don Perata
