= Robert Amparan =

American criminal defense attorney

Robert Marlowe Amparan is an American criminal defense attorney based in San Francisco, California.

Amparan was charged in multiple cases by the California State Bar that he had accepted money from clients and then intentionally, recklessly, and repeatedly failed to appear at scheduled court hearings, or do any other work on behalf of the clients, or respond to the clients repeated attempts to contact him.

== Career ==
Amparan is a former member of the San Francisco Public Defender's Office and focuses mainly on criminal defense. He has practiced law in both California State and Federal Courts. Mr. Amparán has garnered local attention in San Francisco for his aggressive defense style.

=== Ed Rosenthal ===
Amparan represented Ed Rosenthal in his retrial in Federal Court for allegedly distributing marijuana despite the fact that Rosenthal was deputized by the City of Oakland to help administer medical marijuana under California's medical marijuana law.

=== John Mark Karr ===
In August 2006, an American teacher living abroad named John Mark Karr falsely confessed to the unsolved murder of JonBenét Ramsey, creating a media frenzy. Ramsey was found beaten and strangled in the basement of her family's home in Boulder, Colorado, in 1996. Karr said he was present when Ramsey died and called her death an "accident". Karr was arrested in Bangkok, Thailand, on August 16, 2006, by Thai authorities, then released to U.S. agents and flown first to Los Angeles, California, then to Boulder for further investigation. On August 28, prosecutors announced they had decided not to pursue charges in connection with the murder after DNA tests failed to place Karr at the scene. Karr was held in Boulder until September 12, 2006, when he was transported to Sonoma County, California to face unrelated misdemeanor child pornography charges. Mr. Amparán agreed to represent him. On September 20, 2006, Amparan was quoted as saying of Karr that he was a "Southern gentleman with a sense of humor." The case was dismissed on October 5, 2006.
