= Sala Burton =

American politician (1925–1987)

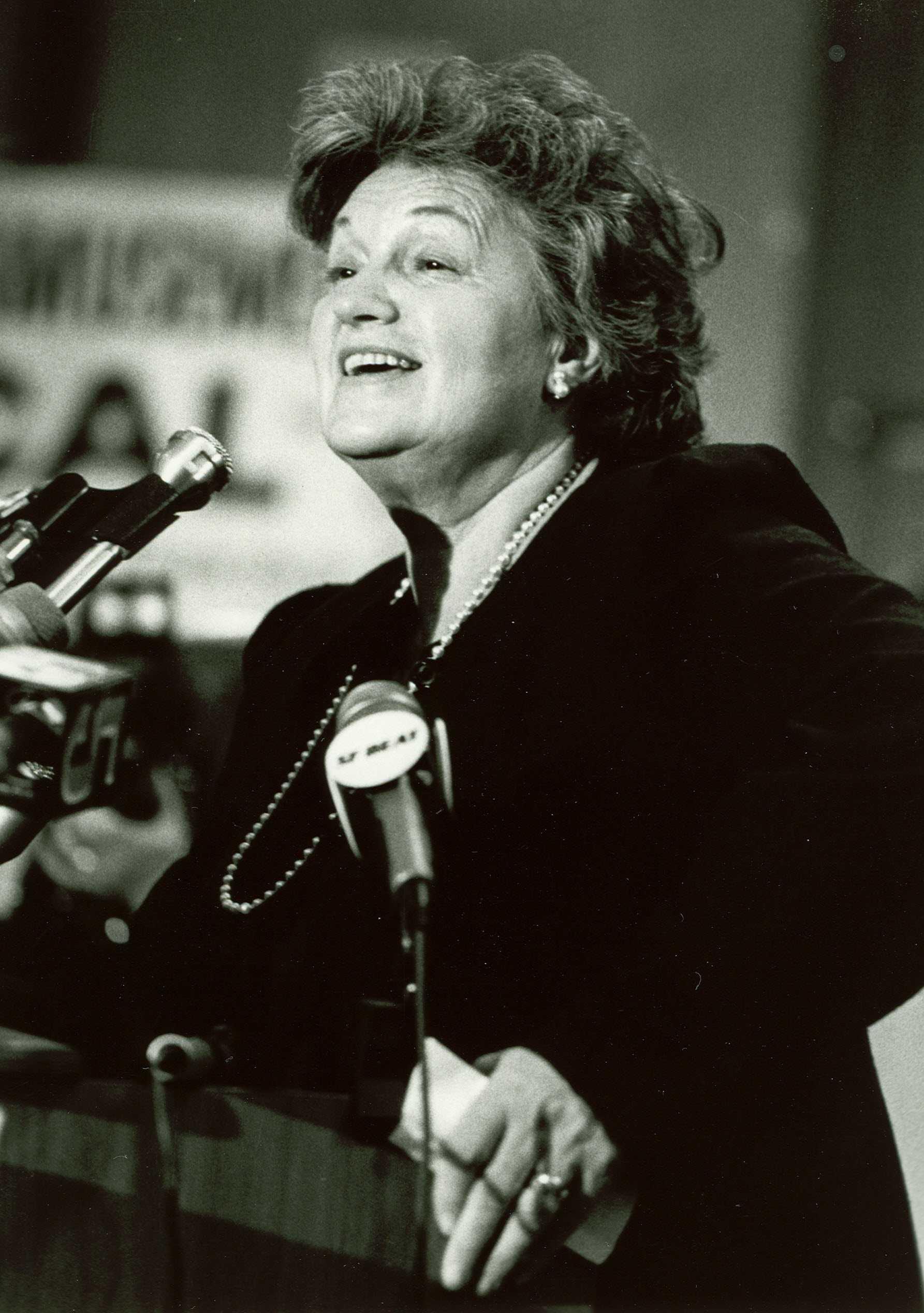

Member of the U.S. House of Representatives from California's 5th district
- In office June 21, 1983 – February 1, 1987
- Preceded by: Phillip Burton
- Succeeded by: Nancy Pelosi

Personal details
- Born: Sala Galante; April 1, 1925 Białystok, Podlaskie, Poland
- Died: February 1, 1987 (aged 61) Washington, D.C., U.S.
- Resting place: Presidio of San Francisco
- Party: Democratic
- Spouse(s): Irving Lipschultz Phillip Burton (m. 1953; died 1983)
- Children: 1
- Relatives: John Burton (brother-in-law)

Sala Burton (née Galante; April 1, 1925 – February 1, 1987) was a Polish-born American politician who served as a United States representative from California from 1983 until her death from colon cancer in Washington, D.C., in 1987.

== Early life and education ==
She was born Sala Galante into a Jewish family in Białystok, Poland, on April 1, 1925. The family immigrated to the US in 1939, before the German invasion of Poland, and she attended public schools in San Francisco and then the University of San Francisco.

== Career ==
She was the associate director of the California Public Affairs Institute from 1948 to 1950. She was the vice president of the California Democratic Council from 1951 to 1954. She served as president of the San Francisco Democratic Women's Forum from 1957 to 1959.

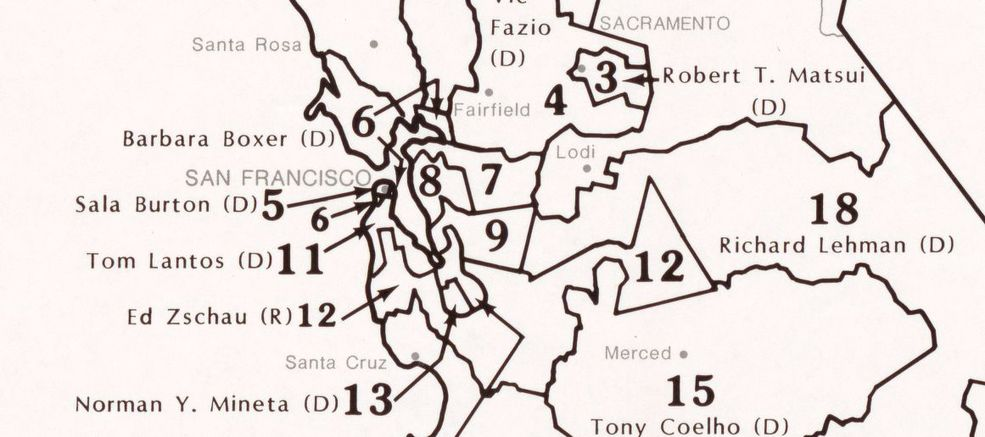
Burton served as the representative from California's 5th congressional district, which at that time was a portion of the city of San Francisco. She served from the time of her first election in 1983 until her death in 1987.

Burton served as a delegate to Democratic National Conventions, 1956, 1976, 1980, and 1984. She was elected as a Democrat to the 98th Congress by special election on June 21, 1983, to fill the vacancy caused by the death of her husband, United States Representative Phillip Burton.

She was reelected to the two succeeding Congress terms and mentored her successor and future Speaker Nancy Pelosi, who replaced Burton after her death in 1987.

== Personal life ==
Galante married Irving Lipschultz. Together, they had one daughter, Joy. They divorced in 1951. Galante met her second husband Phillip Burton at a California Young Democrats convention in 1950. They were married from 1953 until Phillip Burton's death in 1983. They raised her daughter, Joy, together.

Phillip & Sala Burton High School, on the site of the former Woodrow Wilson High School in San Francisco, is named after the couple.

== Death and legacy ==
Burton died from colon cancer on February 1, 1987, in Washington, D.C., and was buried in the San Francisco National Cemetery in the Presidio.

== Electoral history ==
1983 Special election
Party	Candidate	Votes	%
Democratic	Sala Burton		56.9
Republican	Duncan Lent Howard		23.3
Democratic	Richard Doyle		8.4
Republican	Tom Spinosa		3.7
Republican	Gary Richard Arnold		2.0
Democratic	Tibor Uskert		1.4
Republican	Bill Dunlap		1.3
Democratic	Evelyn K. Lantz		1.1
Democratic	Michael O. Plunkett		0.7
Peace and Freedom	Andrew R. "Paul" Kangas		0.6
Libertarian	Eric A. Garris		0.5
No party	Richard Stypman (Write-in)		
No party	Samuel Unger (write-in)		
Total votes			100.0
Turnout			
Democratic hold			

1984 United States House of Representatives elections in California
Party	Candidate	Votes	%
Democratic	Sala Burton (Incumbent)	139,692	72.3
Republican	Tom Spinosa	45,930	23.8
Libertarian	Joseph Fuhrig	4,008	2.1
Peace and Freedom	Henry Clark	3,574	1.8
Total votes		193,204	100.0
Turnout			
Democratic hold			

1986 United States House of Representatives elections in California
Party	Candidate	Votes	%
Democratic	Sala Burton (Incumbent)	122,688	75.2
Republican	Mike Garza	36,039	22.1
Libertarian	Samuel K. "Sam" Grove	2,409	1.5
Peace and Freedom	Theodore Adrian "Ted" Zuur	2,078	1.3
Total votes		163,214	100.0
Turnout			
Democratic hold			

== See also ==
- List of Jewish members of the United States Congress
- List of members of the United States Congress who died in office (1950–1999)
- Women in the United States House of Representatives

U.S. House of Representatives
Preceded by Phillip Burton (d. April 19, 1983)	Member of the U.S. House of Representatives from California's 5th congressional district June 21, 1983 – February 1, 1987	Succeeded by Nancy Pelosi
