= Medical cannabis in the United States =

Legality of cannabis in the United States Legal for recreational use Legal for medical use No comprehensive medical program ● Decriminalized Notes: · Reflects laws of states and territories, including laws which have not yet gone into effect. Does not reflect federal, tribal, or local laws. · Map does not show state legality of hemp-derived cannabinoids such as CBD or delta-8-THC, which have been legal at federal level since enactment of the 2018 Farm Bill.

In the United States, the use of cannabis for medical purposes is legal in 41 states, four out of five permanently inhabited U.S. territories, and the District of Columbia, as of July 2025. Ten other states have more restrictive laws limiting THC content, for the purpose of allowing access to products that are rich in cannabidiol (CBD), a non-psychoactive component of cannabis. There is significant variation in medical cannabis laws from state to state, including how it is produced and distributed, how it can be consumed, and what medical conditions it can be used for.

The first state to effectively legalize medical cannabis was California in 1996, when voters approved Proposition 215 by a 56–44 margin. Several states followed with successful ballot initiatives in 1998, and in 2000 Hawaii became the first to legalize through an act of state legislature. Legalization of medical cannabis had spread to a majority of states by 2016.

State-regulated medical cannabis was moved to Schedule III of the Controlled Substances Act in April 2026 by acting U.S. Attorney General Todd Blanche.

== Early medical use in the U.S. ==
The medical use of cannabis dates back thousands of years, to ancient China, India, and Egypt. It was popularized in Western medicine by the Irish physician William Brooke O'Shaughnessy, who was introduced to the drug in the 1830s while living abroad in India. O'Shaughnessy documented a number of medical applications for cannabis from the experiments he conducted, noting in particular its analgesic and anticonvulsant effects. He returned to England with a supply of cannabis in 1842, after which its use as medicine quickly spread throughout Europe and the United States.

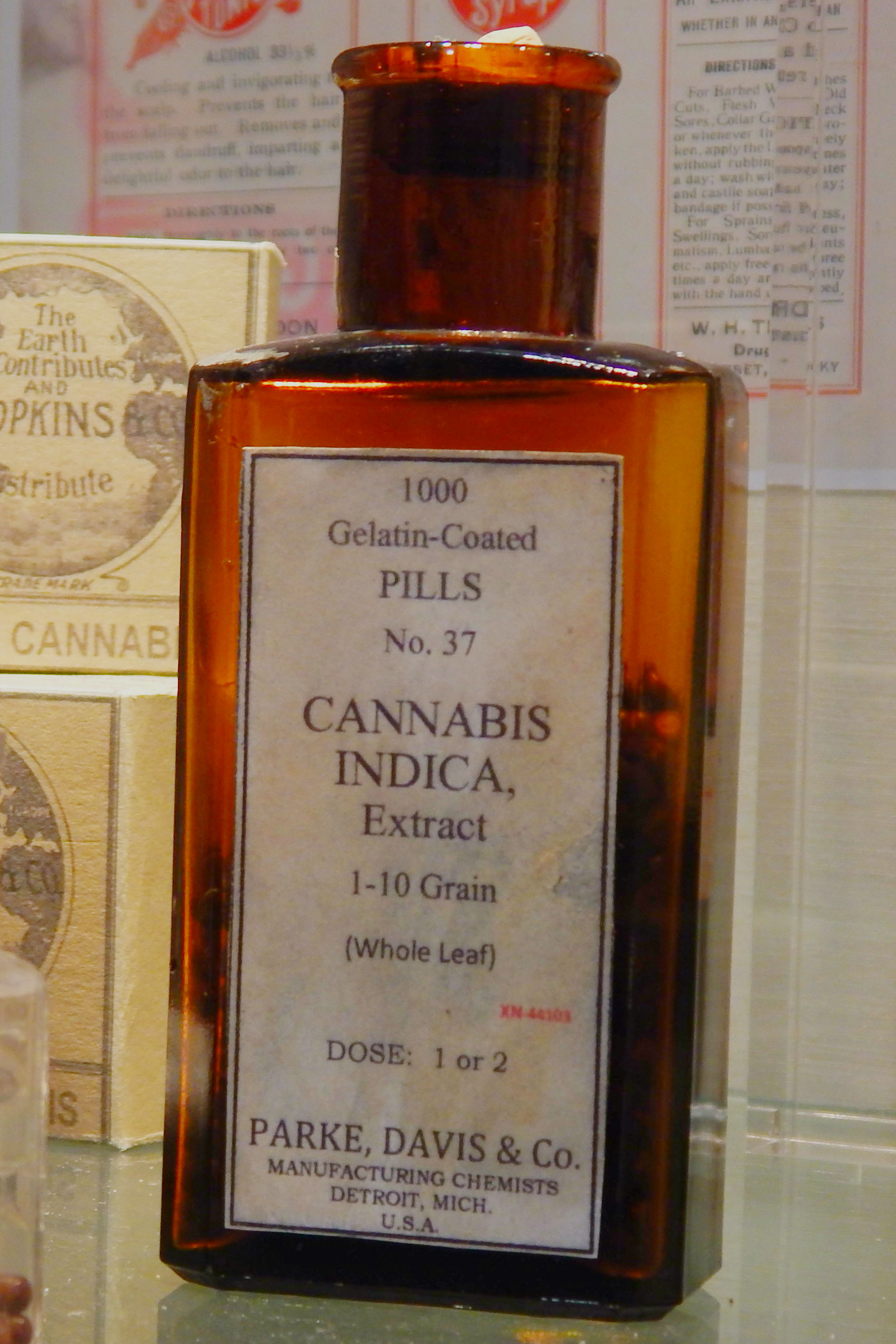
Cannabis pills sold by Parke, Davis & Co.

Cannabis was entered into the United States Pharmacopeia in 1850, as a treatment for neuralgia, tetanus, typhus, cholera, rabies, dysentery, alcoholism, opiate addiction, anthrax, leprosy, incontinence, snakebite, gout, convulsive disorders, tonsillitis, insanity, excessive menstrual bleeding, and uterine bleeding. It was widely available in pharmacies and even grocery stores during the latter half of the 19th century, priced affordably relative to other drugs with no requirement for a doctor's prescription. Cannabis was commonly sold in tincture form by Parke-Davis, Eli Lilly, E. R. Squibb & Sons, and other drug manufacturers.

By the end of the 19th century, the use of cannabis in medicine had declined due to a number of factors, including difficulty in controlling dosages and the rise in popularity of synthetic and opium-derived drugs. The advent of the hypodermic syringe also allowed these drugs to be injected for immediate effect, in contrast to cannabis which is not water-soluble and therefore cannot be injected. Additionally, as fears regarding the recreational use of cannabis began to take hold (prompted by sensationalist media reports and government propaganda campaigns), states began passing legislation to restrict the sale and possession of cannabis, eliminating its availability as an over-the-counter drug. By 1936, every state had passed a law of this manner.

The use of cannabis as medicine further declined with the passage of the Marihuana Tax Act of 1937. The purpose of the act was to prohibit all non-medical use of cannabis in the U.S.; however, it also had the effect of severely curtailing medical use of the drug, due to new fees and regulatory requirements put in place that imposed a significant burden on doctors prescribing cannabis. For this reason the American Medical Association opposed the Marihuana Tax Act of 1937, but to no avail. Cannabis was removed from the U.S. Pharmacopeia in 1941, at the urging of famed anti-cannabis crusader Harry Anslinger.

During the 1960s, as large numbers of people began to use cannabis recreationally, the medical utility of cannabis was rediscovered by some as anecdotes began to appear about its effectiveness in treating a variety of medical conditions. It was officially banned for even medical use, however, following the passage of the 1970 Controlled Substances Act. Despite the strict federal prohibition in place, cannabis continued to gain renewed interest as medicine in the 1970s and 1980s, in particular due to the testimonials of cancer and AIDS patients who reported significant relief from the effects of chemotherapy and wasting syndrome. The smoking method of consumption – popularized by recreational users of the drug – offered particular aid to patients who had trouble keeping down oral medication, and also offered advantages in terms of rapid onset of action and the ability to more carefully control dosages.

== Federal policy ==
=== Controlled Substances Act ===
On October 27, 1970, the Comprehensive Drug Abuse Prevention and Control Act was signed into law by President Richard Nixon. Title II of the act – the Controlled Substances Act – established a system under which all controlled substances are categorized, varying from Schedule I (the strictest classification) to Schedule V (the least strict). Cannabis was placed in the Schedule I category, assumed to have a high potential for abuse and no accepted medical use – thereby prohibiting its use for any purpose. This placement was intended only as a temporary measure, however, pending the results of a commission formed under decree of the CSA to study the dangers of cannabis. Formally known as the National Commission on Marihuana and Drug Abuse, the Shafer Commission – led by former Pennsylvania governor Raymond P. Shafer – submitted the first of its two final reports to the President and Congress in March 1972. Although the report did not address the subject of scheduling, it found that the harms caused by cannabis were overstated, and recommended removal of criminal penalties for possession and distribution of small amounts of the drug. Despite these findings, no action was subsequently taken to move cannabis into a less restrictive category, and the Schedule I classification of cannabis remains in place, alongside other drugs such as heroin, LSD, MDMA, DMT, and peyote – none of which can be prescribed. Schedule II drugs – determined to have a high potential for abuse but also some accepted medical use (thus able to be prescribed) – include cocaine, PCP, methamphetamine, oxycodone, and fentanyl.

=== Rescheduling ===
After enactment of the Controlled Substances Act, there were a number of efforts seeking to place cannabis in a less restrictive category. The Drug Enforcement Administration is granted authority under the CSA to change the classification of any drug, based upon the recommendation of the Food and Drug Administration which evaluates all drugs for safety and efficacy. A 2016 FDA review concluded that cannabis has "no currently accepted medical use in treatment in the United States", in response to a petition filed with the DEA in 2011 by the governors of Washington and Rhode Island. Previous efforts to petition the DEA for rescheduling have also been unsuccessful, spanning the years 1972–1994, 1995–2001, and 2002–2013. Congressional attempts to reschedule have failed as well, including a 1981 bill introduced by Representatives Stewart McKinney and Newt Gingrich that grew to 84 cosponsors but never received a floor vote. However, President Joe Biden announced in October 2022 that he would ask the Secretary of Health and Human Services and Attorney General to initiate a review as to how cannabis should be scheduled under federal law, adding that the Schedule I classification of cannabis "makes no sense". In August 2023, following a review by the Food and Drug Administration, the Department of Health and Human Services issued a recommendation to the DEA that cannabis be moved to Schedule III. In April 2024, the DEA confirmed its intention to reclassify cannabis as a Schedule III drug, pending review by the Office of Management and Budget, a public comment period, and review by an administrative judge.

The classification of cannabis as a Schedule I drug was first challenged by the National Organization for the Reform of Marijuana Laws (NORML) in a 1972 petition to the Bureau of Narcotics and Dangerous Drugs (which was merged with other agencies to form the DEA in 1973). After a decade of legal battles in which the DEA refused to consider the petition, public hearings were finally held on the matter beginning in 1986. In September 1988, after two years of extensive public hearings, DEA Chief Administrative Law Judge Francis L. Young ruled in favor of moving cannabis to a Schedule II classification, finding that "Marijuana, in its natural form, is one of the safest therapeutically active substances known to man." Young concluded: "The evidence in this record clearly shows that marijuana has been accepted as capable of relieving the distress of great numbers of very ill people, and doing so with safety under medical supervision. It would be unreasonable, arbitrary and capricious for DEA to continue to stand between those sufferers and the benefits of this substance in light of the evidence in this record." As Young's ruling was only a non-binding recommendation, however, it was rejected by DEA Administrator John Lawn in December 1989. In February 1994, a final ruling on the original 1972 petition was issued when a U.S. Court of Appeals upheld the decision to keep cannabis a Schedule I drug.

Acting United States Attorney General Todd Blanche reclassified state-licensed medical cannabis to Schedule III on April 23, 2026.

=== Compassionate IND program ===
Despite an official policy denying the medical value of cannabis, the federal government began providing the drug to a limited number of patients through the Compassionate Investigational New Drug program in 1978. The program was created following a lawsuit filed by Robert Randall, a Washington, D.C. resident who was arrested for cultivating cannabis in 1975. Citing the glaucoma that threatened to take his eyesight, Randall employed a medical necessity defense at trial to justify his use of cannabis. The charges against Randall were dismissed, and as a result of an ensuing petition filed with the FDA, Randall became the first person to receive cannabis from the federal government in 1976. After his supply was cut off in 1978, he filed a lawsuit to have it restored, setting in motion the creation of the Compassionate Investigational New Drug program shortly thereafter. The program allowed patients with serious medical conditions to receive a regular supply of cannabis from the federal government; however, only 13 ended up participating due to the complicated and drawn-out application process involved.

The Compassionate IND program was closed to new patients in 1992, due to a flood of new applications from AIDS patients and concerns that the program undercut Bush administration efforts to discourage illegal drug use. James O. Mason, the head of U.S. Public Health Service, explained that keeping the program in place created the perception that "this stuff can't be so bad", and noted that AIDS patients provided with cannabis would be more likely to engage in unsafe sex. Twenty-eight applications that had recently been approved were rescinded, and only the 13 individuals who were already receiving cannabis were allowed to do so moving forward. All but two of the patients have since died; the surviving two patients are the only persons who currently receive cannabis through the program.

=== Federal enforcement ===
==== Clinton administration ====
Concurrent with the re-election of President Bill Clinton in 1996, California voters approved Proposition 215 to legalize the medical use of cannabis, and a similar (but ultimately ineffective) measure was passed in Arizona. In response, the Clinton administration reiterated its firm opposition to the medical use of cannabis, and threatened to revoke the prescription-writing abilities of doctors who recommend or prescribe the drug. Additionally, threats were made to criminally prosecute physicians, and ban them from participating in Medicare and Medicaid. A group of physicians challenged this policy as a violation of First Amendment rights, and in September 2000 prevailed in the case Conant v. McCaffrey, which affirmed the right of physicians to recommend (but not prescribe) cannabis. Prior to the ruling, an April 1997 preliminary injunction prevented the administration from taking these actions.

Apart from the threatened crackdown on physicians, the administration conducted raids on a number of medical cannabis providers, leading to the filing of civil and criminal charges. At trial, prosecutors were set to easily secure convictions, as jurors could not be informed that the cannabis was for medical use authorized under state law. Drug czar Barry McCaffrey also railed strongly against the medical use of cannabis – deriding it as "Cheech & Chong medicine" – and worked behind closed doors to coordinate a media campaign to sway public opinion against approving further initiatives.

==== Bush administration ====
Despite previously speaking in support of states' rights on the issue of medical cannabis, President George W. Bush escalated efforts to enforce federal law during his 8 years in office, with more than 260 raids conducted and 84 individuals prosecuted by his administration. Heavy use of paramilitary tactics and gear was common in execution of the raids, along with the frequent use of civil forfeiture, allowing cash and property to be seized without need for criminal conviction. In 2007, the administration began targeting landlords renting to medical cannabis facilities, informing property owners that they faced up to 20 years in prison for violating the "crack house statute" of the CSA, in addition to seizure of their properties. Drug czar John P. Walters was particularly active in opposing the medical use of cannabis, campaigning against initiatives in a number of states in what medical cannabis advocates charged was an inappropriate use of taxpayer dollars and a violation of the Hatch Act. During Bush's second term, in June 2005, the Supreme Court ruled in favor of the federal government's ability to enforce federal law in states that have legalized medical cannabis, in the case Gonzales v. Raich.

==== Obama administration ====
The presidency of Barack Obama was noted for a strong federal crackdown on medical cannabis during his first term in office, despite early indications that his administration would take a more hands-off approach. During his 2008 campaign for president, Obama expressed support for allowing states to implement their own medical cannabis policies, stating: "I'm not going to be using Justice Department resources to try to circumvent state laws on this issue." These comments were then echoed by the administration in March 2009 when Attorney General Eric Holder stated that only medical cannabis providers "who violate both federal and state law" would be targeted for prosecution. Additionally, an October 2009 memo from Deputy Attorney General David Ogden laid out further guidelines for federal enforcement that largely affirmed this hands-off approach. Despite these pronounced intentions of lessened enforcement from the Obama administration, however, an increasing number of raids were conducted during Obama's first two years in office, surpassing even the Bush administration in frequency.

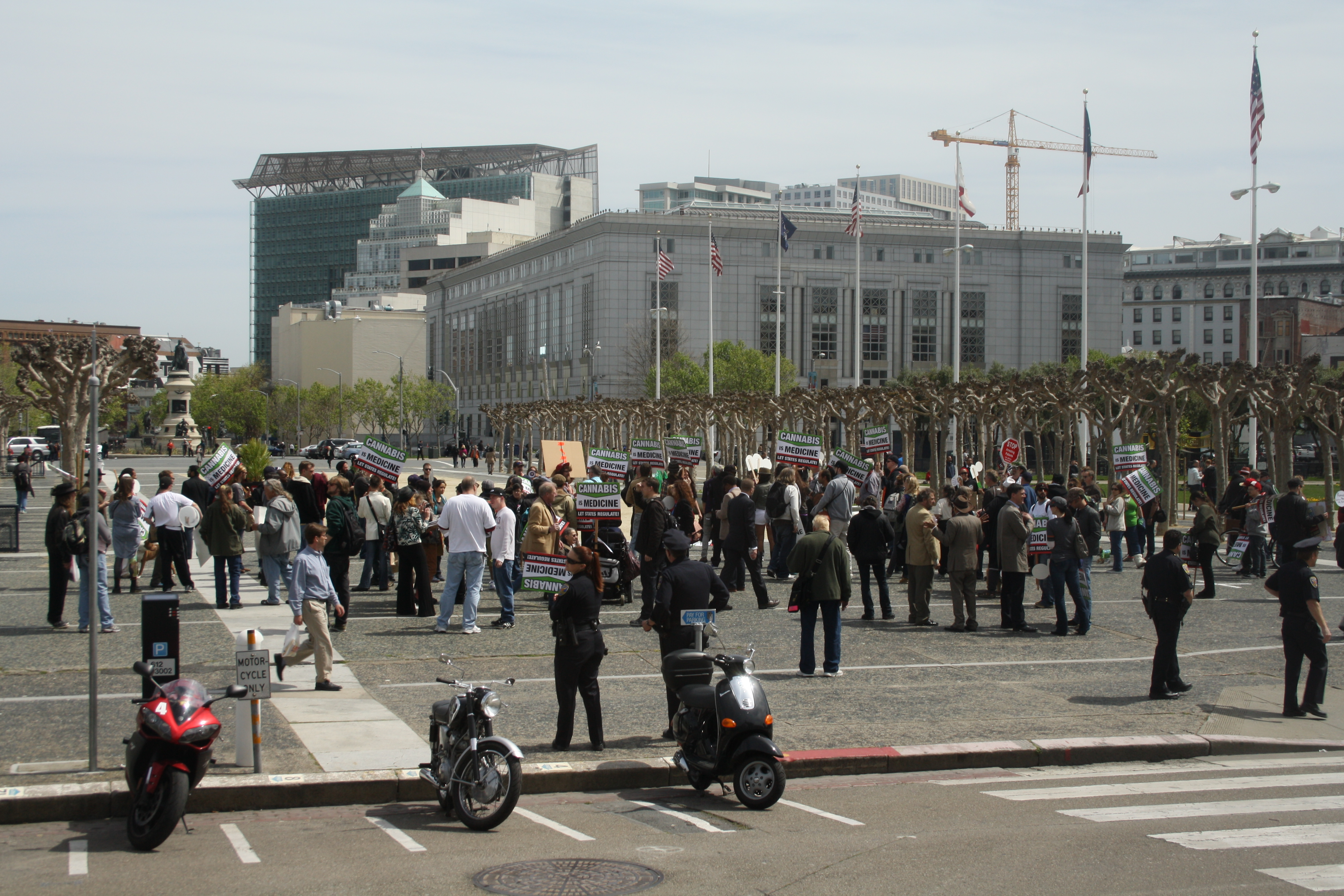
"Cannabis is Medicine, Let States Regulate!" protest in San Francisco, April 4, 2012

Federal enforcement efforts against medical cannabis were further escalated in early 2011, as a campaign of coercing state and local governments was initiated by the Justice Department. Letters were sent out by U.S. Attorneys to a number of state and city officials, threatening to criminally prosecute these individuals if the implementation of new medical cannabis laws moved forward. Some letters also threatened prosecution of state employees, or even the seizure of state administrative buildings (such as those used for the processing of medical cannabis licenses). In response to outcry and requests for clarification from numerous officials, a new memo was issued by Deputy Attorney General James M. Cole in June 2011. The Cole memo insisted that the 2009 Ogden memo was being adhered to, and that the Ogden memo's protections applied only to individual patients and not commercial operations. As the raids continued following release of the Cole memo, U.S. Attorneys sent out hundreds more letters over the next two years, threatening landlords with criminal prosecution and seizure of property for renting to medical cannabis providers. By June 2013, the total cost of the Obama administration crackdown on medical cannabis had climbed to $289 million, surpassing the previous 8 years of the Bush administration by $100 million. And the number of raids conducted during Obama's first 4 1/2 years had reached 270, in contrast to 260 during Bush's 8 years.

Early in President Obama's second term, in August 2013, the Justice Department issued a new Cole memo setting forth the conditions under which federal law would be enforced. The memo was prompted in particular by the recent legalization of non-medical cannabis in Washington and Colorado, but also addressed enforcement in medical cannabis states. Regarding the medical use of cannabis, the memo was considered to take a significantly more deferential approach towards the states (compared to the 2011 Cole memo), similar in nature to how the 2009 Ogden memo was originally widely interpreted. Federal enforcement efforts were further scaled back with the enactment of the Rohrabacher–Farr amendment in December 2014, although the Justice Department initially continued with a number of prosecutions until a pair of court rulings determined it was interpreting the amendment incorrectly.

=== Rohrabacher–Farr amendment ===
On December 16, 2014, a landmark victory was achieved for medical cannabis at the federal level with the signing into law of the Rohrabacher–Farr amendment. Initially introduced by Rep. Maurice Hinchey in 2001, the amendment prohibits the Justice Department from spending funds to interfere with the implementation of state medical cannabis laws. It failed 152–273 upon its initial vote in 2003, and was defeated five more times over the next decade until it passed the House by a 219–189 margin on May 30, 2014, as an attachment to the CJS Appropriations bill for fiscal year 2015. It did not receive a vote in the Senate, but was inserted into the $1.1 trillion "cromnibus" spending bill during final negotiations, which became law with President Obama's signature on December 16, 2014. The Rohrabacher–Farr amendment passed the House by an even larger margin (242–186) in June 2015, then won approval in a 21–9 Senate Appropriations Committee vote, and was signed into law as part of the FY 2016 omnibus appropriations bill on December 18, 2015. The amendment was subsequently included in a series of spending bills with the most recent extension effective through September 30, 2024.

Although state medical cannabis programs are protected by the amendment, it does not change the legal status of cannabis, and must be renewed each fiscal year in order to remain in effect. The Justice Department has also interpreted the amendment in a manner vastly different from the authors' intent, which it has used to justify a number of raids and prosecutions after the law's enactment. U.S. District Judge Charles Breyer ruled against the Justice Department in October 2015, however, stating that the DOJ interpretation "defies language and logic" and "tortures the plain meaning of the statute", and was "counterintuitive and opportunistic". The Ninth Circuit Court of Appeals similarly rejected the DOJ's arguments in an August 2016 ruling.

== State policy ==
=== Early laws (late 1970s and early 80s) ===
Due to increasing public awareness of the medical benefits of cannabis, and in anticipation of forthcoming changes to federal policy, a number of states passed laws in the late 1970s and early 1980s addressing the medical use of cannabis. New Mexico was the first to do so in 1978, and by the end of 1982 over thirty states had followed suit. The majority of these laws sought to provide cannabis through federally-approved research programs administered by the states, using cannabis supplied by the National Institute on Drug Abuse. Only seven states ended up implementing the programs, however, due to the large bureaucratic and regulatory obstacles imposed by the federal government. Other states passed legislation allowing doctors to prescribe cannabis, or reclassifying cannabis in a state's internal drug scheduling system. These laws were largely ineffectual though, due to the continued prohibition of medical cannabis at the federal level. A few states passed laws affirming the right of individuals to present a medical necessity defense at trial. By the mid-80s, however, efforts to pass new medical cannabis laws had ground to a halt, and a number of existing laws were either repealed or allowed to expire.

=== California (early and mid-1990s) ===
Medical cannabis advocates began to gain ground in the early 1990s with a series of legislative achievements in the state of California. Proposition P was approved by 79% of San Francisco voters in November 1991, calling on state lawmakers to pass legislation allowing the medical use of cannabis. Additionally, the city board of supervisors passed a resolution in August 1992 urging the police commission and district attorney to "make lowest priority the arrest or prosecution of those involved in the possession or cultivation of [cannabis] for medicinal purposes" and to "allow a letter from a treating physician to be used as prima facia evidence that marijuana can alleviate the pain and suffering of that patient's medical condition". The resolution enabled the open sale of cannabis to AIDS patients and others within the city, most notably through the San Francisco Cannabis Buyers Club which was operated by medical cannabis activist Dennis Peron (who spearheaded Proposition P and later the statewide Proposition 215). Similar clubs appeared outside San Francisco in the ensuing years as other cities passed legislation to support the medical use of cannabis. The Wo/Men's Alliance for Medical Marijuana was founded in 1993 after 75% of Santa Cruz voters approved Measure A in November 1992. And the Oakland Cannabis Buyers' Cooperative was founded in 1995 shortly before the city council passed multiple medical cannabis resolutions.

Following the lead of San Francisco and other cities in California, state lawmakers passed Senate Joint Resolution 8 in 1993, a non-binding measure calling on the federal government to enact legislation allowing physicians to prescribe cannabis. In 1994, Senate Bill 1364 was approved by state legislators, to reclassify cannabis as a Schedule II drug at the state level. And Assembly Bill 1529 was approved in 1995, to create a medical necessity defense for patients using cannabis with a physician's recommendation, for treatment of AIDS, cancer, glaucoma, and multiple sclerosis. Both SB 1364 and AB 1529 were vetoed by Governor Pete Wilson, however, paving the way for the passage of Proposition 215 in 1996.

=== Modern laws (1996 to present) ===
Frustrated by vetoes of medical cannabis bills in successive years, medical cannabis advocates in California took the issue directly to the voters, collecting 775,000 signatures for qualification of a statewide ballot initiative in 1996. Proposition 215 – the Compassionate Use Act of 1996 – was subsequently approved with 56% of the vote, legalizing the use, possession, and cultivation of cannabis by patients with a physician's recommendation, for treatment of cancer, anorexia, AIDS, chronic pain, spasticity, glaucoma, arthritis, migraine, or "any other illness for which marijuana provides relief". The law also allowed patient caregivers to cultivate cannabis, and urged lawmakers to facilitate the "safe and affordable distribution of marijuana".

Also in 1996, 65% of Arizona voters approved Proposition 200, a drug policy reform initiative containing a provision allowing physicians to prescribe cannabis. The medical use provision was then essentially repealed by state legislators a few months later, but the change was rejected by voters in a 1998 veto referendum. Ultimately the medical use provision was ineffective, however, due to language that created significant conflict with federal law (use of the word "prescribe" instead of "recommend").

In 1998, medical cannabis initiatives were voted on in the states of Washington, Oregon, Alaska, and Nevada – all of which passed. Also, in Washington, D.C., Initiative 59 to legalize the medical use of cannabis passed with 69% of the vote, but a series of amendments introduced by Rep. Bob Barr and approved by Congress prevented its implementation for over a decade. The initial Barr amendment was enacted prior to the November 1998 election but after ballots had been printed, thereby allowing D.C. residents to vote on the initiative but preventing the results from being made public. The amendment was challenged by the American Civil Liberties Union on grounds that it violated First Amendment rights, and in September 1999 U.S. District Judge Richard W. Roberts agreed, overturning the Barr amendment. Rep. Barr then introduced a similar amendment which became law in November 1999, setting off a long legal battle until finally in December 2009 the Barr amendment was removed from the annual D.C. appropriations bill, allowing the original 1998 ballot initiative to move forward.

Following the approval of several ballot measures in 1998, Maine voters passed a medical cannabis initiative in 1999 that was expanded by both state legislature and another ballot initiative in subsequent years. In 2000, medical cannabis initiatives were passed in the states of Colorado and Nevada, with Nevada's initiative passing for a second consecutive election as required to amend the state's constitution. Also in 2000, Hawaii became the first state to legalize medical cannabis through an act of state legislature.

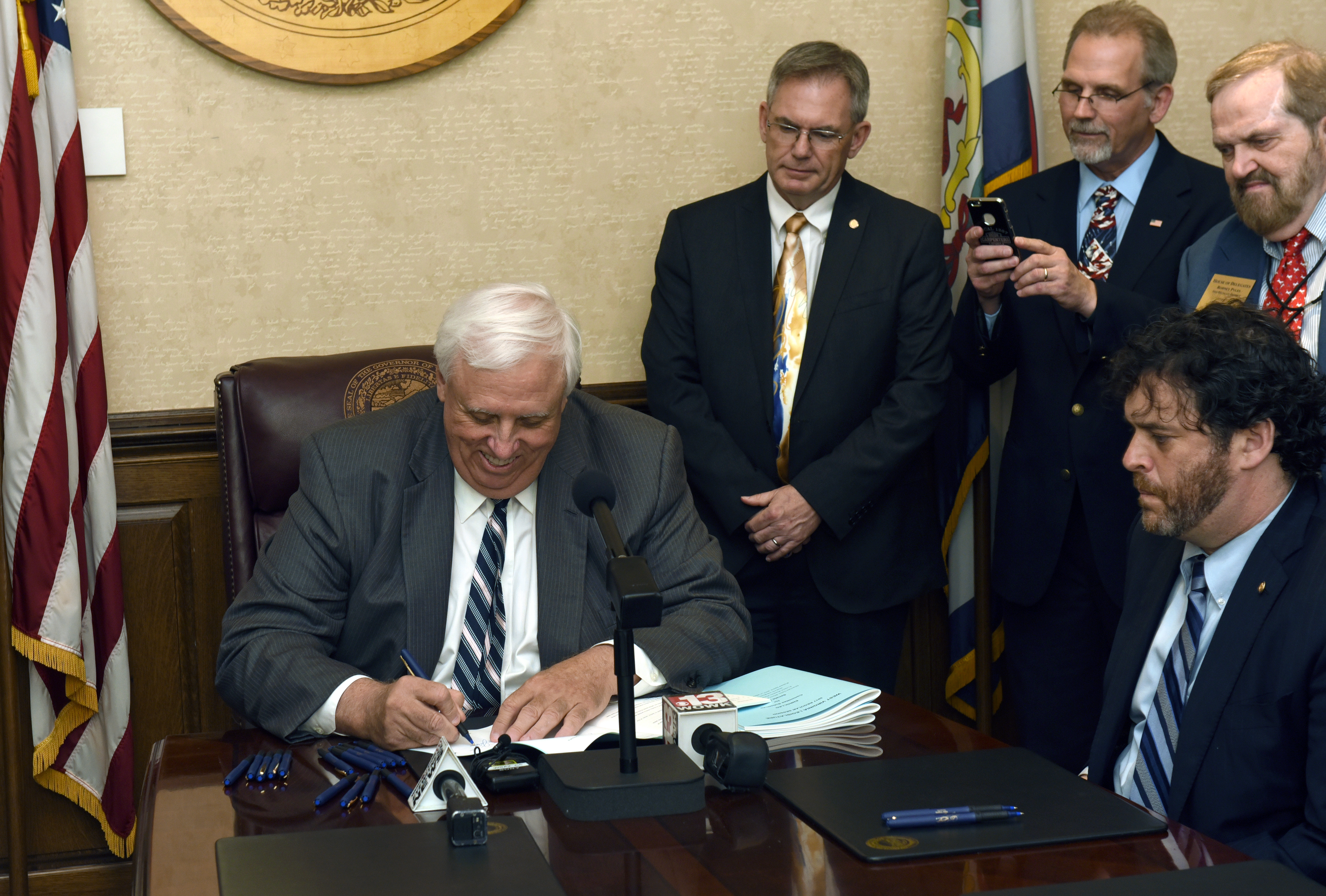
West Virginia Governor Jim Justice signs a bill to legalize medical cannabis on April 19, 2017

In the following years, medical cannabis was legalized by ballot measure in Montana (2004), Michigan (2008), Arizona (2010), Massachusetts (2012), Arkansas (2016), Florida (2016), North Dakota (2016), Oklahoma (2018), Missouri (2018), Utah (2018), South Dakota (2020), and Nebraska (2024), (Note: Mississippi voters approved a ballot measure to legalize medical cannabis in 2020, but it was overturned by the Supreme Court of Mississippi due to a flaw in the state's ballot initiative process. Mississippi later legalized through an act of state legislature in 2022.) and by an act of state legislature in Vermont (2004), Rhode Island (2006), New Mexico (2007), New Jersey (2010), Delaware (2011), Connecticut (2012), New Hampshire (2013), Illinois (2013), Maryland (2014), Minnesota (2014), New York (2014), Pennsylvania (2016), Louisiana (2016), Ohio (2016), West Virginia (2017), Virginia (2020), Alabama (2021), Mississippi (2022), Kentucky (2023), Texas (2025), and Georgia (2026). Nineteen states have legalized by ballot measure and 22 have by state legislature, for a total of 41 states according to the National Conference of State Legislatures. The U.S. territories of Guam (2014 – ballot measure), Puerto Rico (2015 – executive order), the Northern Mariana Islands (2018 – legislature), and the U.S. Virgin Islands (2019 – legislature) have also legalized the medical use of cannabis.

==== Low-THC, high-CBD laws ====
In addition to states that have passed comprehensive medical cannabis laws, a number of states have passed more restrictive laws that limit the allowable concentration of tetrahydrocannabinol (THC), the main psychoactive component of cannabis. The primary purpose of these laws is to allow for the use of cannabidiol (CBD), a non-psychoactive cannabinoid that has been shown to be effective in the treatment of seizure disorders, particularly in children. The use of CBD to treat seizure disorders gained increased attention with a number of media reports in 2012 and 2013, and by the end of 2015 sixteen states had "low-THC, high-CBD" laws in effect. Currently 9 states are considered to have low-THC, high-CBD laws. These laws vary in THC content allowed all the way up to 5% in Kansas.

== Research ==
As a Schedule I drug in the U.S., clinical research on cannabis must be approved by the Food and Drug Administration, and a license (also referred to as a "registration") must be obtained from the Drug Enforcement Administration specific to conducting research on Schedule I drugs. The petition to the FDA is submitted in the form of an Investigational New Drug application, which the FDA has 30 days to respond to. DEA research registrations are issued for Schedule I and Schedule II–V drugs, with the Schedule I registration mandating stricter compliance requirements such as the manner in which substances are stored and secured. The DEA has 60 days to respond to registration applications as required by the 2022 Medical Marijuana and Cannabidiol Research Expansion Act. Prior to the act, researchers reported that the application process sometimes took over a year.

In addition to FDA approval and DEA registration, other requirements have been imposed for cannabis research that do not exist for any other drug, which has had a significant effect in limiting the amount of research conducted. One such requirement was established in 1999 when it was mandated that all proposed research be submitted to the U.S. Public Health Service for approval. This was of particular burden to researchers as there was no timeline in which PHS was required to respond, with some reviews taking years to complete. In June 2015 the PHS review was eliminated, however, to better streamline the process for approving medical cannabis research.

Prior to 2021, clinical research on cannabis also required the approval of the National Institute on Drug Abuse. The stated mission of NIDA is to support research on the causes, consequences, prevention, and treatment of drug abuse and drug addiction, and not the medicinal uses of drugs. Consequently, many studies on the therapeutic benefits of cannabis were either denied or altered to comply with the limited scope and mission of NIDA. There is also no timeline in which NIDA is required to respond to proposals (as with the PHS review), which has resulted in delays in getting research approved ranging from months to years. Additionally, the cannabis provided by NIDA has been criticized as being inferior to that which is commonly used by medical cannabis patients in states where it is legal. Criticisms of NIDA-supplied cannabis include high amounts of stems and seeds, high mold and yeast levels, low THC content, and low diversity of strains available.

=== NIDA monopoly ===
From the agency's 1974 inception until 2021, NIDA was the sole provider of cannabis for research purposes in the U.S., contracting with the University of Mississippi for cultivation of the cannabis. The monopoly was maintained by the refusal of the Drug Enforcement Administration to issue additional licenses for the cultivation and distribution of cannabis, which the DEA said was consistent with the terms of the U.N. Single Convention on Narcotic Drugs that was ratified in 1961. Others disputed this interpretation of the treaty, however (including the U.S. State Department), and the DEA's interpretation was not consistent with the fact that multiple licenses have been issued for the production of other Schedule I drugs. The DEA also cited the possibility of diversion from cultivation facilities as justification for not issuing additional licenses.

==== Craker application ====
Critics of the former NIDA monopoly have pointed to the case of University of Massachusetts Amherst professor Lyle Craker as an example of the DEA's undue resistance to granting additional cultivation licenses. Professor Craker's endeavor to obtain a license began in June 2001, when he submitted an application to the DEA, which, later in 2001, the DEA claimed to have lost. After a photocopy was resubmitted, the DEA rejected the application in February 2002 because it did not have an original signature. In July 2002, the original application was returned to Professor Craker unprocessed, with a date stamp showing it had been received in June 2001. The application was then resubmitted in August 2002, upon which the DEA confirmed receipt. On July 24, 2003, a notice regarding Craker's application was filed in the Federal Register, with a public comment period ending on September 23, 2003. In October 2003, U.S. Senators John Kerry and Ted Kennedy wrote a letter to DEA Administrator Karen Tandy expressing support for granting Professor Craker a license. On December 10, 2004, however, following a lawsuit filed over unreasonable delay in responding to the application, the DEA rejected Craker's application. Professor Craker then filed another lawsuit in response to the rejection, and also requested a hearing on the matter from a DEA Administrative Law Judge, which was granted. On February 12, 2007, after almost two years of extensive public testimony and evidence gathering, DEA Administrative Law Judge Ellen Bittner issued an 87-page opinion in favor of granting Professor Craker a license. Additionally, 45 members of Congress wrote to DEA Administrator Karen Tandy in September 2007 urging that the decision be upheld. In January 2009, however, acting DEA Administrator Michele Leonhart rejected the recommended ruling of Judge Bittner and declined to issue a license. In response, 16 members of Congress wrote to Attorney General Eric Holder in February 2009, asking that the Leonhart ruling be withdrawn. An additional letter was sent by Senators John Kerry and Ted Kennedy in April 2009. The ruling was upheld by Leonhart in an August 2011 decision, however, and again by the First Circuit Court of Appeals in April 2013.

==== End of monopoly ====
On August 11, 2016, the DEA announced intention to issue additional licenses for the cultivation of research-grade cannabis, in order to end the decades-long monopoly held by NIDA and the University of Mississippi. In August 2019, following inquiries from Congress about the status of the licenses, the DEA clarified that new regulations needed to be developed before the approval of applications could proceed. In May 2021, the DEA announced that it had notified an unspecified number of cultivators that they had been granted preliminary approval for a license. As of August 2022 the DEA lists seven organizations that have active licenses to cultivate cannabis.

== Advocacy ==
=== Support ===
==== Organizations ====
Americans for Safe Access is the leading advocacy group in the U.S. dedicated to medical cannabis policy reform. Founded in 2002 by medical cannabis patient Steph Sherer, it has grown to over 100,000 members in 50 states. Other groups include the National Organization for the Reform of Marijuana Laws, Marijuana Policy Project, and Drug Policy Alliance, although these focus more broadly on policy reform regarding both medical and non-medical use.

Medical organizations that have issued statements in support of allowing patient access to medical cannabis include the American Nurses Association, American Public Health Association, American Medical Student Association, National Multiple Sclerosis Society, Epilepsy Foundation, Leukemia & Lymphoma Society, National Women's Health Network, Gay and Lesbian Medical Association, and several AIDS advocacy organizations.

Religious denominations in the U.S. that have voiced support for allowing the medical use of cannabis include the Episcopal Church, Presbyterian Church (USA), United Church of Christ, United Methodist Church, Union for Reform Judaism, the Unitarian Universalist Association, and the Catholic Church.

American Legion, the nation's largest military veterans organization, passed a resolution at their September 2016 annual convention calling on Congress to remove cannabis from the list of Schedule I drugs. In December 2016, the organization lobbied the incoming Trump administration to reclassify cannabis as a Schedule III drug.

The National Conference of State Legislatures, National League of Cities, and U.S. Conference of Mayors have all called for cannabis to be removed from the list of Schedule I drugs. The National Association of Counties has called on Congress to "enact legislation that promotes the principles of federalism and local control of cannabis businesses ... under state law".

Delegates at the 2016 Democratic National Convention voted to approve a party platform calling for cannabis to be removed from the list of Schedule I drugs. Other organizations that have called for rescheduling include the American Bar Association and the National Sheriffs' Association.

==== Individuals ====
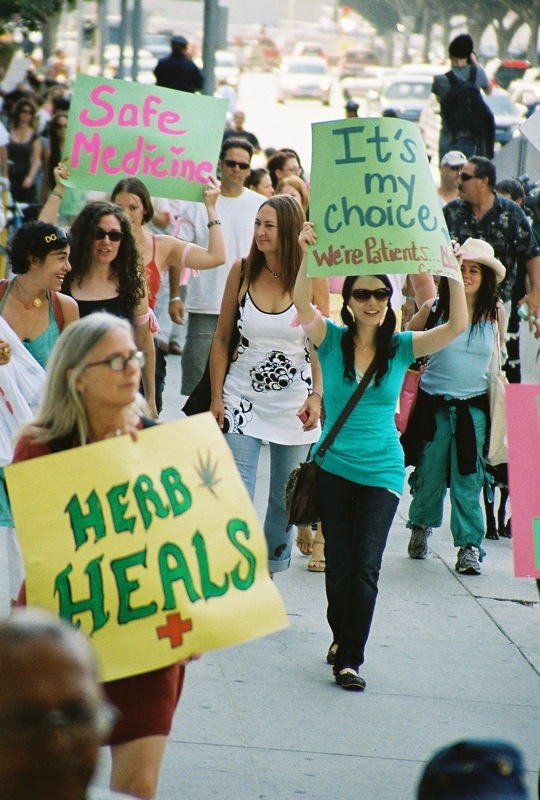
Medical cannabis supporters demonstrate in Los Angeles (August 2007)

Individuals who have been particularly active in efforts to support the medical use of cannabis include Robert Randall, Dennis Peron, Ed Rosenthal, Steve Kubby, Steve DeAngelo, Richard Lee, Jon Gettman, Brownie Mary, and Tod H. Mikuriya. Former talk show host Montel Williams is an advocate who uses cannabis to treat his multiple sclerosis, a topic he has testified about in a number of states considering medical cannabis legislation. Former U.S. Surgeon General Joycelyn Elders has also testified in support of medical cannabis legislation in several states.

Members of Congress who have introduced legislation to allow the medical use of cannabis include Ron Paul, Barney Frank, Maurice Hinchey, Sam Farr, Dana Rohrabacher, Steve Cohen, Don Young, Jared Polis, Earl Blumenauer, Tom Garrett, Rand Paul, and Bernie Sanders. Rep. Rohrabacher (R–CA) has been particularly active in congressional reform efforts, introducing multiple medical cannabis bills including the Rohrabacher–Farr amendment for a number of years until it became law in 2014. He also uses a cannabis-based drug to relieve the symptoms of his arthritis.

Eugene Monroe, Derrick Morgan, Kyle Turley, and Jim McMahon are among a group of NFL players that have advocated for allowing the use of cannabis in the league, as a treatment option for concussions and a pain reliever that can reduce reliance on addictive opioid drugs. NBA head coach Steve Kerr has also voiced support for the medical use of cannabis in professional sports.

Dr. Sanjay Gupta, neurosurgeon and chief medical correspondent for CNN, has produced a five-part documentary series for the network – titled Weed – arguing in favor of the medical benefits of cannabis. Gupta was initially dismissive toward the medical use of cannabis, but upon researching further he changed his mind and wrote a column apologizing for his past views. Filmmaker Jed Riffe has also explored the subject in his 2006 documentary Waiting to Inhale.

=== Opposition ===
The American Academy of Pediatrics and American Psychiatric Association oppose the legalization of medical cannabis outside the FDA approval process. However, the AAP also supports rescheduling for the purpose of facilitating research.

Individuals who have been particularly active in opposing the medical use of cannabis include Barry McCaffrey, John Walters, Andrea Barthwell, Bill Montgomery, Mark Souder, Sheldon Adelson, Mel Sembler, and Kevin Sabet.

Former U.S. Rep. Bob Barr was a particularly ardent opponent of medical cannabis in Congress, introducing the "Barr amendment" which blocked implementation of a Washington, D.C. ballot initiative legalizing the medical use of cannabis. After leaving Congress, however, Barr renounced his earlier views and joined Marijuana Policy Project to lobby for repeal of the legislation he originally authored.

=== Other ===
The American Medical Association and American College of Physicians do not take a position on the legalization of medical cannabis, but have called for the Schedule I classification to be reviewed. The American Academy of Family Physicians and American Society of Addiction Medicine also do not take a position, but do support rescheduling to better facilitate research. The American Heart Association supports rescheduling to allow for "a more nuanced approach to marijuana legislation and regulation". The American Cancer Society and American Psychological Association have noted the obstacles that exist for conducting research on cannabis, and have called on the federal government to better enable scientific study of the drug.

== Cannabinoid drugs ==
There are currently four cannabinoid drugs (Marinol, Syndros, Cesamet, and Epidiolex) available for prescription use in the United States. For non-prescription use, CBD derived from hemp is legal at the federal level but legality (and enforcement) varies by state.

=== Dronabinol ===
Dronabinol is synthetically manufactured THC. It has been approved by the FDA in pill form as Marinol and in oral solution form as Syndros.

==== Marinol ====
Marinol is a sesame oil suspension of dronabinol encapsulated in a gelatin shell. It received FDA approval in 1985 for treatment of nausea and vomiting associated with chemotherapy, and additionally in 1992 as an appetite stimulant for treatment of AIDS-related weight loss. It was initially classified as a Schedule II drug until it was moved to Schedule III in 1999. Marinol was developed by Unimed Pharmaceuticals, although initial research on the drug was mostly funded by the U.S. government. Unimed Pharmaceuticals was acquired by Solvay Pharmaceuticals in 1999.

==== Syndros ====
Syndros is a liquid oral formulation of dronabinol approved for treatment of nausea and vomiting related to chemotherapy and weight loss associated with AIDS. Syndros received FDA approval in July 2016 and was assigned a Schedule II classification by the DEA in March 2017. Syndros is manufactured by Insys Therapeutics, which received attention in 2016 for contributing heavily to the defeat of a cannabis legalization measure in Arizona, in an apparent attempt to protect market share for the newly developed drug. Syndros became available for prescription use in July 2017.

=== Nabilone ===
Nabilone is a synthetic cannabinoid similar to THC in molecular structure. It is sold in pill form only as the drug Cesamet.

==== Cesamet ====
Cesamet received FDA approval in 1985 for treatment of chemotherapy-induced nausea and vomiting. It was discontinued by its manufacturer Eli Lilly in 1989 for commercial reasons, and in 2004 U.S. rights to the drug were sold to Valeant Pharmaceuticals. In 2006 Valeant received FDA approval to resume sales. Cesamet has remained a Schedule II drug since its first introduction.

=== Cannabidiol ===
Cannabidiol (CBD) is a non-psychoactive cannabinoid extracted from the cannabis plant. It has received FDA approval as the drug Epidiolex.

==== Epidiolex ====
Epidiolex is a liquid oral formulation of cannabidiol. It received FDA approval for treatment of seizures associated with Dravet syndrome and Lennox–Gastaut syndrome in June 2018, and was assigned a Schedule V classification by the DEA in September 2018. Epidiolex is manufactured by Greenwich Biosciences, a U.S. subsidiary of the British firm GW Pharmaceuticals. Epidiolex became available for prescription use in November 2018.

In April 2020, the DEA removed Epidiolex from the list of federally controlled substances. In August 2020, Epidiolex was approved for treatment of seizures associated with tuberous sclerosis complex.

==== Non-prescription use ====
In addition to its use for treatment of seizure disorders, cannabidiol is used by some individuals under the belief that it possesses a number of other medical properties – but these claims have yet to be thoroughly studied and proven. The FDA has thus not approved CBD for any other medical use; however, the 2018 farm bill legalized CBD extracted from hemp (less than 0.3% THC) at the federal level. The legality of CBD products also varies by state, and in some jurisdictions prohibition is not strictly enforced.

== Effects of legalizing medical cannabis ==
A 2016 study found significant drops in violent crime in states that have legalized medical cannabis. A 2017 study similarly found that introduction of medical cannabis laws caused a reduction in violent crime in American states that border Mexico.

A 2018 study found that legalizing medical cannabis in some states made residents of neighboring states increasingly tolerant toward cannabis regulation.

A 2013 study found that medical cannabis legalization is associated with an 8-11% reduction in traffic fatalities.

Several studies have found decreased rates of opioid use and abuse in states that have legalized medical cannabis.

Several studies have found no increase in teen use in states that have legalized cannabis for medical purposes. A 2018 meta-analysis in the journal Addiction similarly found no increase.

== Organ transplants for marijuana users ==
California allowed marijuana to be prescribed by physicians when Proposition 215 was approved in 1996. Of the transplant programs using the United Network for Organ Sharing, many retained their existing protocols, which regarded users of drugs, including marijuana, as poor transplant candidates. As the regulated marijuana growing industry developed slowly, there was concern that patients would use the illicit market and the transplant would fail because of Aspergillus infection and cannabis contaminants such as PCP. Aspergillus can cause a fatal lung infection in an immunocompromised transplant patient.

The advocacy group Americans for Safe Access publicized two patients who were taken off the national waiting list by Cedars-Sinai Medical Center in Los Angeles because of their marijuana use. It emphasized that their prescriptions were written by doctors who were on staff at the hospital, not by any of the Venice Beach dope doctors. The patients were later restored to the list, but at the end. One was seeking a new kidney, the other a liver.

The California legislature eventually banned disqualification for prescribed marijuana use unless it is "deemed clinically significant" in an individual case. As late as 2024, a nationwide survey of heart transplant programs found no consensus on whether marijuana users are good transplant candidates, and offered no discussion of whether access to licensed growers was relevant.

== Qualifying conditions ==
Below is a comparison of medical conditions for which doctors can recommend cannabis in each state or territory. The table does not include all approved conditions and could contain outdated information. Low-THC, high-CBD states are not listed.

State	Alzheimer's disease	Autism	Cancer	Crohn's disease	Epilepsy	Glaucoma	HIV/AIDS	Multiple sclerosis	Parkinson's disease	PTSD	Seizures	Wasting syndrome	Notes
Alaska	No	No	Yes	No	Yes	Yes	Yes	Yes	No	No	Yes	Yes	
Arizona	Yes	No	Yes	Yes	Yes	Yes	Yes	Yes	No	Yes	Yes	Yes	
Arkansas	Yes	No	Yes	Yes	Yes	Yes	Yes	Yes	No	Yes	Yes	Yes	
California	Yes	Yes	Yes	Yes	Yes	Yes	Yes	Yes	Yes	Yes	Yes	Yes	
Colorado	No	Yes	Yes	No	Yes	Yes	Yes	Yes	No	Yes	Yes	Yes	
Connecticut	No	Yes	Yes	Yes	Yes	Yes	Yes	Yes	Yes	Yes	Yes	Yes	
Delaware	Yes	Yes	Yes	Yes	Yes	Yes	Yes	Yes	Yes	Yes	Yes	Yes	HB 285 removed qualifying conditions, allowing for doctors to decide if medical cannabis would benefit a patient's condition.
District of Columbia	Yes	Yes	Yes	Yes	Yes	Yes	Yes	Yes	Yes	Yes	Yes	Yes	
Florida	No	No	Yes	Yes	Yes	Yes	Yes	Yes	Yes	Yes	Yes	No	
Guam	Yes	Yes	Yes	Yes	Yes	Yes	Yes	Yes	Yes	Yes	Yes	Yes	
Hawaii	No	No	Yes	Yes	Yes	Yes	Yes	Yes	Yes	Yes	Yes	Yes	
Illinois	Yes	Yes	Yes	Yes	Yes	Yes	Yes	Yes	Yes	Yes	Yes	Yes	
Kentucky	No	No	Yes	No	Yes	No	No	Yes	No	Yes	Yes	No	
Louisiana	Yes	Yes	Yes	Yes	Yes	Yes	Yes	Yes	Yes	Yes	Yes	Yes	
Maine	Yes	Yes	Yes	Yes	Yes	Yes	Yes	Yes	Yes	Yes	Yes	Yes	
Maryland	No	No	Yes	No	Yes	Yes	Yes	Yes	No	Yes	Yes	Yes	
Massachusetts	Yes	Yes	Yes	Yes	Yes	Yes	Yes	Yes	Yes	Yes	Yes	Yes	
Michigan	Yes	Yes	Yes	Yes	Yes	Yes	Yes	Yes	Yes	Yes	Yes	Yes	
Minnesota	Yes	Yes	Yes	Yes	Yes	Yes	Yes	Yes	No	Yes	Yes	Yes	
Mississippi	Yes	Yes	Yes	Yes	Yes	Yes	Yes	Yes	Yes	Yes	Yes	Yes	
Missouri	Yes	Yes	Yes	Yes	Yes	Yes	Yes	Yes	Yes	Yes	Yes	Yes	
Montana	No	No	Yes	Yes	Yes	Yes	Yes	Yes	No	Yes	Yes	Yes	
Nevada	No	Yes	Yes	No	Yes	Yes	Yes	Yes	No	Yes	Yes	Yes	
New Hampshire	Yes	Yes	Yes	Yes	Yes	Yes	Yes	Yes	Yes	Yes	Yes	Yes	
New Jersey	No	No	Yes	Yes	Yes	Yes	Yes	Yes	No	Yes	Yes	No	
New Mexico	Yes	Yes	Yes	Yes	Yes	Yes	Yes	Yes	Yes	Yes	Yes	Yes	
New York	No	No	Yes	Yes	Yes	No	Yes	Yes	Yes	Yes	Yes	Yes	
North Dakota	Yes	No	Yes	Yes	Yes	Yes	Yes	Yes	No	Yes	Yes	Yes	
N. Mariana Islands	Yes	No	Yes	Yes	Yes	Yes	Yes	Yes	Yes	Yes	Yes	Yes	
Ohio	Yes	No	Yes	Yes	Yes	Yes	Yes	Yes	Yes	Yes	Yes	No	
Oklahoma	Yes	Yes	Yes	Yes	Yes	Yes	Yes	Yes	Yes	Yes	Yes	Yes	
Oregon	Yes	No	Yes	No	Yes	Yes	Yes	Yes	No	Yes	Yes	Yes	
Pennsylvania	No	Yes	Yes	Yes	Yes	Yes	Yes	Yes	Yes	Yes	Yes	No	
Puerto Rico	Yes	Yes	Yes	Yes	Yes	Yes	Yes	Yes	Yes	Yes	Yes	Yes	
Rhode Island	Yes	Yes	Yes	Yes	Yes	Yes	Yes	Yes	No	Yes	Yes	Yes	
U.S. Virgin Islands	Yes	No	Yes	Yes	Yes	Yes	Yes	Yes	Yes	Yes	Yes	Yes	
Utah	Yes	Yes	Yes	Yes	Yes	No	Yes	Yes	No	Yes	Yes	Yes	
Vermont	No	No	Yes	Yes	Yes	Yes	Yes	Yes	Yes	Yes	Yes	Yes	
Washington	No	No	Yes	Yes	Yes	Yes	Yes	Yes	No	Yes	Yes	Yes	
West Virginia	No	No	Yes	Yes	Yes	No	Yes	Yes	Yes	Yes	Yes	Yes	

Data additionally obtained from Leafly and ProCon.org.

== Reciprocity ==
Many states have reciprocity laws that recognize out-of-state registrations for medical cannabis patients.

Below is a list of reciprocity policies as of October 8, 2021.

State	Possession reciprocity	Buying reciprocity	Notes
Alabama	No	No	
Alaska	No	No	
Arizona	Yes	No	
Arkansas	Yes	Yes	
California	No	No	
Colorado	No	No	
Connecticut	No	No	
Delaware	No	No	
District of Columbia	Yes	Yes	
Florida	No	No	
Guam	No	No	
Hawaii	Yes	Yes	
Illinois	No	No	
Kentucky	No	No	
Louisiana	No	No	
Maine	Yes	Yes	
Maryland	No	No	
Massachusetts	No	No	
Michigan	Yes	Yes	Other state must also offer reciprocity to have reciprocity in the state of Michigan.
Minnesota	No	No	
Missouri	Yes	No	
Montana	Yes	No	
Nevada	Yes	Yes	
New Hampshire	Yes	Yes	Full reciprocity as of August 2021
New Jersey	Yes	Yes	
New Mexico	Yes	Yes	
New York	No	No	
North Dakota	No	No	
Ohio	No	No	
Oklahoma	Yes	Yes	
Oregon	No	No	
Pennsylvania	No	No	Possession reciprocity only for valid minor patients from other states with parents or guardians.
Puerto Rico	Yes	Yes	
Rhode Island	Yes	Yes	
U.S. Virgin Islands	Yes	Yes	
Utah	Yes	No	
Vermont	No	No	
Virginia	No	No	
Washington	No	No	
West Virginia	No	No	Only for terminally ill cancer patients.

== See also ==
- History of medical cannabis
- Legal history of cannabis in the United States
- Legality of cannabis by U.S. jurisdiction
- Legalization of non-medical cannabis in the United States
- Removal of cannabis from Schedule I of the Controlled Substances Act
- Timeline of cannabis laws in the United States
