= Cannabis Action Network =

US cannabis law reform group, 1989–2008

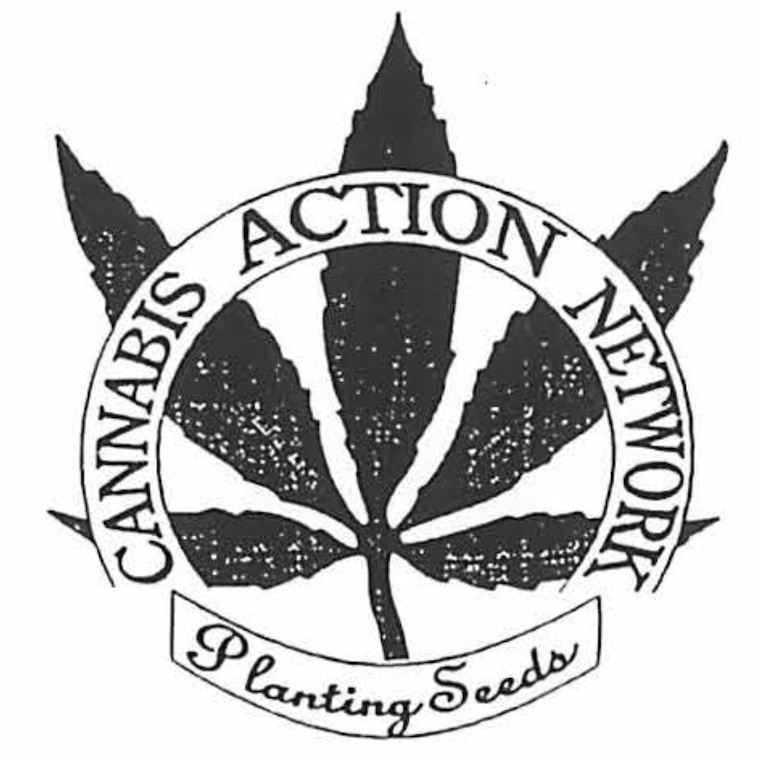
- Formation: 1989
- Founders: Debby Goldsberry; Doug McVay; Rick Pfrommer; Monica Pratt
- Type: Nonprofit organization
- Purpose: Cannabis education; cannabis policy reform
- Headquarters: 1605 Ashby Avenue, Berkeley, U.S. ^{(formerly)}
- Region served: United States

The Cannabis Action Network (CAN) is a former U.S. nonprofit cannabis policy reform organization, active between 1989 and 2008. The organization strove to "encourage sensible cannabis use" and advocated for "safe access for responsible adults and patients" through the "challenge to the laws of the United States and the individual states prohibiting the possession and distribution of marijuana".

Constituted as a loose informal network of local groups, the CAN was involved in advocacy, capacity-building, and education, the organization of political and cultural rallies and conferences, and legal assistance.

== History ==
Based on an informal group of friends active since 1986, the Cannabis Action Network (CAN) was founded as a state nonprofit corporation in Lexington, Kentucky in 1989 by Doug McVay, Monica Pratt, Rick Pfrommer, Kevin Aplin, and Debby Goldsberry.

During its first years, the group held information booths in various cultural events in Kentucky and Louisiana, and increasingly in California. In 1992, CAN moved its headquarters to Berkeley.

CAN organized its first rally one year later at People's Park, with the participation of Dennis Peron. On 20 April 1995, CAN organized its first 4/20 event in San Francisco, an event which would become a key activity for the group in the following decades.

In the late 1990s, CAN members Jim McClelland, Don Duncan, and Goldsberry used the Berkeley Patients Group dispensary "as a platform for activism, mobilizing patients, and working to insure a favorable political climate for dispensaries in Berkeley."

By the mid-1990s, under the impulsion of its U.S. hemp tour, numerous CAN chapters appeared across the country. One of these, the Florida CAN, was constituted in 1998 and has remained active after the nationwide Cannabis Action Network suspended its activities in 2008.

Even after the formal suspension of its activities, CAN remained an important part of cannabis activism in the United States, as its members got involved in various other advocacy projects. CAN has been credited for "[fulfilling] an important niche in re-establishing a politically viable cannabis law reform movement in America."

== Activities ==
In her study on the CAN, Heidi Henrickson listed the group's 1992-1993 strategy and objectives as: activist resources center, cannabis legalization tours, media strategy, college campus network, music industry outreach, a mail order program, as well as "outreach to groups involved in drug policy change, freedom of choice and religion, civil and constitutional rights, environmental & peace movement, etc." Henrickson describes CAN as "a unique organization based purely on volunteers, or full-time and part-time activists living and working together to achieve change" and, at the time, "one of the most active in the Marijuana Movement."

=== Advocacy and communication ===
CAN was involved in communication efforts to address the public perceptions of a plant that "shared the fate of the hippie", attempting to introduce an alternative discourse to the then prominent D.A.R.E campaign. CAN activists "[claimed] that the misinformation about hemp has produced unjust, inhumane, and unconstitutional laws."

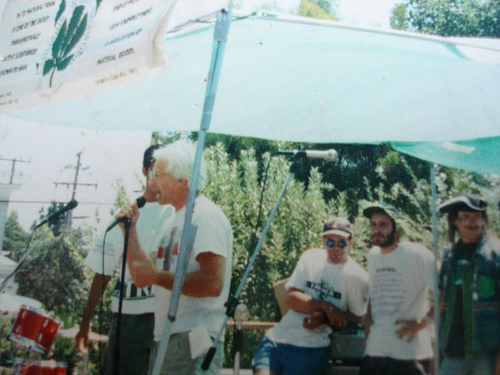
Cannabis activist Dennis Peron speaking at the first CAN rally in Berkeley, 1993

Importantly influenced by Jack Herer's book The Emperor Wears No Clothes, the group tried to shape a narrative connecting the different uses of the cannabis plant (often referred separately as industrial hemp or marijuana, besides being the same plant genus) and drawing upon its multifaceted history in the United States, insisting on the "numerous positive uses of cannabis." In 1993, the New York Times described CAN as:

a small band of young true believers who crisscross the country preaching a revisionist argument for legalization. In what many call a linguistic sleight of hand, their message is heavy on hemp, the old name for the once-legal and widely cultivated marijuana plant used for canvas, paper and paint. The tactic, shared by many "hempheads", has an oddly historical and environmental appeal; in addition, it allows advocates to talk about pot without mentioning that it gets you high.

This approach at times received criticism, such as from David Fratello of the Drug Policy Institute.

=== Hemp tour ===
In 1989–1989, informal hemp tours had been organized around Jack Herer and Ben Masel of the Yippie Party. After its constitution, CAN started to organize bi-annual tours of the United States between 1993 and 1996, reaching a total of 47 States. The goal of CAN's tour was to connect activist groups and spread their message on the public perceptions of the cannabis plant, and "build local educational organizations in most major college towns and major cities all over the United States." CAN members Melina Bloomfield, Mack Coyle, Kelly Crandall, Richard Davis, Rachel Dawson, Etienne Fontan, Elvy Musikka participated in the tour, among others. In cities visited, "sometimes, it was a festival. Sometimes, a university debate."

The "hemp tour" was in part supported by Richard Davis' truck, carrying the tour's display and materials consisting of:

The Hemp Museum, a visual display of hemp products from around the world, including twine, cloth, a rug, bird seed mix and paper; Literature expressing our message and information about cannabis, civil liberties, and freedom of choice; Communicative items such as books, t-shirts, buttons, stickers, as well as imported hemp products; A petition and a mailing list sign-up sheet.

While CAN has been recognized as a pioneer of women leadership in the cannabis policy reform movement, the pre-1989 hemp tours also raised criticism around "sexist attitudes" participating in strengthening the formalization of CAN as a safe space for women involvement in advocacy.

=== 4/20 events ===
The CAN is most commonly known for its important role in the popularization of the number "420" (and the associated date of April 20 and hour 4:20) as the main cultural and political rally to educate the public and protest the state of cannabis laws and policies. CAN co-founder Debby Goldsberry declared:

I first heard about 420 in 1990, at a Grateful Dead show at the Oakland Coliseum, when a hippie breezed by our Cannabis Action Network (CAN) booth giving out fliers. They had a scrawny marijuana leaf drawn next to "420” and "Wake'n'Bake", surrounding a proclamation asking everyone to "Smoke Pot at 4:20." The CAN crew quickly figured out it was 4:20 somewhere, more than 24 times a day, and got busy spreading the news to others.

After some years holding rallies in the San Francisco bay area and elsewhere in the country, CAN organized its first 4/20 event in San Francisco on 20 April 1995 from 4:20 a.m. to 4:20 p.m. The group would continue organizing the event yearly as the "annual hemp festival" for eleven years, often at the Maritime Hall in San Francisco, and coordinated the organization of events and rallies on April 20 in other cities around the United States, particularly in California, Florida, Kentucky, Missouri, Oregon, Washington, and the District of Columbia.

CAN also joined and supported hundreds of other cannabis-related events and marches across the country and abroad, particularly in the Netherlands. A study listed the participation in more than 40 events only in September and October 1992.

=== Other activities ===
By the 2000s, CAN started providing legal assistance for users to "understand their rights to avoid arrest and prosecution."

In 2000, the group also collaborated with Stanton Peele and others in the publication of the Guidelines for sensible cannabis use.

== See also ==
- 420 (cannabis culture)
- Elvy Musikka
- Dennis Peron
- Jack Herer
- Ben Masel
- Ed Rosenthal
- Etienne Fontan
- High Times
- Berkeley Patients Group
- NORML
