= Etienne Fontan =

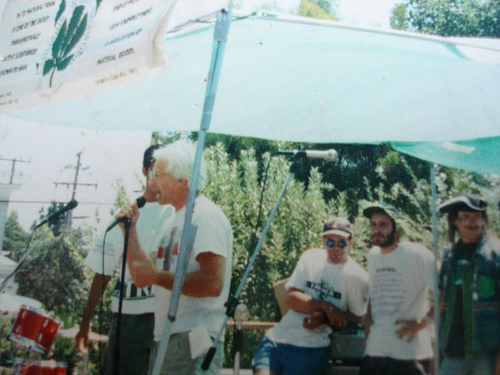
- Étienne Fontan (second from the right) at a rally organized by CAN at People's park in 1993.
- Born: August 28, 1969 (age 56)
- Occupation: Cannabis activist
- Organizations: CAN (1992–2001); BPG (2003–present); NCIA (2010–2021)

Étienne Fontan (born 28 August 1969) is a U.S. cannabis activist, entrepreneur, and military veteran based in Berkeley, California, active in cannabis advocacy since the early 1990s with NGOs like Cannabis Action Network and with the retail dispensary Berkeley Patients Group.

== Biography ==
=== Military service ===
Fontan served in the U.S. Army during the 1991 Gulf War, assigned to the West Virginia Army National Guard and participated in "Operation Desert Storm." During his service, he was diagnosed with Gulf War Syndrome, a chronic multiple-symptom condition. After the war, military doctors reportedly recommended cannabis to treat his symptoms. A positive drug test led to his discharge and his loss of veterans’ benefits. These experiences informed his later activism for veteran health and cannabis policy.

=== Cannabis activism ===
Fontan became involved in cannabis activism in 1993, when he joined the Cannabis Action Network (CAN). Over the decades, Fontan has lobbied at local, state, and federal levels for patients’ rights and cannabis law reform. He is associated with other activist groups such as Americans for Safe Access at the federal level, and since 2020, with the Veterans Action Council (VAC). He has collaborated with Berkeley's former mayor Tom Bates and U.S. Reps. Barbara Lee and Earl Blumenauer to support various initiatives. He also reportedly contributed to the works of researchers like Tod H. Mikuriya, Lester Grinspoon, Robert C. Clarke, and others. In 2021, Fontan was co-recipient of the Dennis Peron Award with Wanda James.

In recent years, Fontan has been engaged internationally on broader drug policy reform advocacy. He attended the United Nations Commission on Narcotic Drugs with activists Michael Krawitz (VAC and FAAAT), Farid Ghehiouèche (ENCOD), and Myrtle Clarke (Dagga Couple). With them he co-founded the "Cannabis Embassy."

=== Business ventures ===
Fontan's primary business role is with the Berkeley Patients Group, a dispensary opened in 1999 in a regulatory "gray zone." Part of BPG since the beginning, Fontan stepped-up at the managing role after the death of Jim McClelland, the original owner, in 2001. He has since served as vice president. Fontan led various charitable initiatives, patient advocacy, and community giving campaigns with BPG to support veterans, medical patients, and various social justice causes.

Fontan has been involved in other cannabis business ventures. The VAC mentions that he "founded medical and recreational cannabis retail, cultivation, and processing facilities" in multiple locations in California, the brand NuLeaf in Nevada, and reportedly other States.

In the cannabis industry, Fontan has been active in professional associations. He co-founded and served on the board of directors of the National Cannabis Industry Association (NCIA) from 2010 to 2021, being chair in 2012.

Fontan has been involved in several litigation with BPG, notably following 2012–2013 raids by federal prosecutors on several Berkeley dispensaries under a policy of strict enforcement near schools. BPG's property was seized in a civil asset forfeiture action even though no crime was charged. Fontan's team sued to stop the eviction, and in 2016 a federal judge dismissed the forfeiture case against BPG, just before California legalized adult use. Fontan himself has not been charged with any federal crimes, his legal involvement being primarily defensive. Fontan has been more recently involved in litigation with the Veterans Action Council.

== See also ==
- Cannabis in California
- 420 (cannabis culture)
- Cannabis Action Network
- Berkeley Patients Group
- Americans for Safe Access
- Veterans Action Council
- Dennis Peron
- Richard Lee
- Michael Krawitz
- Farid Ghehiouèche
- Elvy Musikka
- Dennis Peron
- Jack Herer
- Ed Rosenthal
- Dagga Couple
