= Berkeley Patients Group =

Cannabis dispensary in Berkeley, California

- Type: Privately held company
- Industry: Medical cannabis, advocacy
- Founded: 1999; 27 years ago
- Headquarters: 2366 San Pablo Avenue, Berkeley, California, U.S.
- Website: mybpg.com

The Berkeley Patients Group (BPG) is the oldest continuously operating cannabis dispensary in the United States, inaugurated in 1999 in Berkeley, California. BPG has been known not only for cannabis dispensation, but also for its involvement in advocacy campaigns for cannabis policy reforms and the rights of patients using marijuana for medical purposes, and for its involvement with the scientific community.

The BPG has been praised by successive Mayors of Berkeley Tom Bates and Jesse Arreguín and described as "embraced by local officials as a model business that donates to the poor and pays millions in taxes." In the City of Berkeley, the October 31 has been declared the "Berkeley Patients Group Day".

== History ==
In 1996, voters in the State of California passed proposition 215, "allowing ill Californians to use cannabis for medical purposes with a doctor's recommendation. But Proposition 215 produced an immediate backlash with regard to implementation" leading to a slow roll-out of a system effectively allowing patients to access cannabis, and years of legal uncertainty.

Initially, AIDS patient Jim McClelland (known for coining the name Oaksterdam) had worked at the Oakland Cannabis Buyers Club. After its closure in October 1998, McClelland joined forces with Debby Goldsberry and Don Duncan to open a similar cannabis dispensary in Berkeley. On October 31, 1999, the group obtained a miscellaneous retail sales permit from authorities and opened on 5th Street in Berkeley, a city where "officials were more responsive to activists and aware of the importance of medical marijuana provision to their constituents."

McClelland died in 2001, and Duncan left BPG in 2004. Debby Goldsberry continued to operate the BPG with Etienne Fontan and others.

Timeline of BPG's operators and location
Dates	Operators	Location
1999–2000	Jim McClelland, Debby Goldsberry, Don Duncan	5th Street
2000–2001	Jim McClelland, Debby Goldsberry, Don Duncan	2747 San Pablo Ave.
2001–2004	Debby Goldsberry, Don Duncan	2747 San Pablo Ave.
2004–2008	Debby Goldsberry, Etienne Fontan	2747 San Pablo Ave.
2008–2010	Debby Goldsberry, Etienne Fontan, Tim Schick	2747 San Pablo Ave.
2010–2012	Etienne Fontan, Tim Schick	2747 San Pablo Ave.
2012-2012	Etienne Fontan, Tim Schick	No facility; Delivery
2012–2023	Etienne Fontan, Tim Schick	2366 San Pablo Ave.

The group aimed to "create a safe place where underserved patients can acquire high-quality medicine in a welcoming, community-centric environment", but legislation at the time did not allow proper business operations or legal certainty for medical cannabis dispensation. On November 4, 2008, after years of advocacy for it by the three dispansaries operating at the time, voters finally approved the citizen-initiative "Measure JJ" in the City of Berkeley which, among other provisions:

Permitted medical marijuana dispensaries "as a matter of right" under the zoning ordinance rather than through a use permit subject to a public hearing.

The measure allowed the BPG to obtain a business license in 2009 and to operate as a certified B Corporation. Following the 2016 approval of Adult Use of Marijuana Act (California Proposition 64), the BPG opened its sales to non-patients in January 2018, being the first dispensary in the Bay area to obtain temporary permit.

=== Prosecutions ===
During its decades of operations under a changing State and federal legislation, the BPG was subject to a number of raids and criminal prosecutions, some of which were publicized in the media. For instance, in 2007, during an episode of wave of letters to dispensaries' landlords, the BPG has their assets seized. In 2012, during a coordinated crackdown on California's dispensaries announced by district chief prosecutors, the BPG was forcefully evicted on the grounds that it was located 984 feet away from the French school Ecole Bilingue de Berkeley, Proposition 215 establishing a minimum of 1000 feet.

Federal prosecutions forced BPG into changes of location and of organizational practices. Initially based during a few months on 5th Street, the city forced BPG to move to 2747 San Pablo Avenue in 2000, in the commercial districts of the city. That location allowed on-site consumption, until the 2012 eviction. The BPG operated via delivery for some months, before reopening down the street at 2366 San Pablo Avenue, where BPG remained as of 2023. Federal prosecution also attempted to evict BPG from its new location on similar grounds as in 2012, threats that only extinguished in 2014 when the Rohrabacher–Farr amendment was approved by Congress.

== Activities ==
=== Activism ===
Since its inception the group had to engage in advocacy to defend the legality of their activities. Jim McClelland was an activist close to the Cannabis Action Network, and after his death, Duncan and Goldsberry "used the dispensary as a platform for activism, mobilizing patients, and working to insure a favorable political climate for dispensaries in Berkeley."

The BPG has been known for providing cannabis free of charge for patients unable to pay.

BPG members like Debby Goldsberry were also involved in organizing some of the first "420 events" on April 20 in Berkeley. Duncan was involved in the creation of Americans for Safe Access.

Etienne Fontan has been involved in advocacy at federal level with the National Cannabis Industry Association and the Veterans Action Council. In recent years, Fontan has also been involved with Michael Krawitz and the NGOs ENCOD, FAAAT, and Fields of Green for All at the United Nations, sharing the history and experience of the BPG in conferences and statements.

=== Participation in scientific research ===
In 2009, 350 patients from the BPG participated in a study on "Cannabis as a substitute for alcohol and other drugs."

== See also ==
- Cannabis in California and Drug policy of California
- Medical cannabis
- Cannabis in the United States and its legal history
- San Francisco Cannabis Buyers Club
