= Scott Feil =

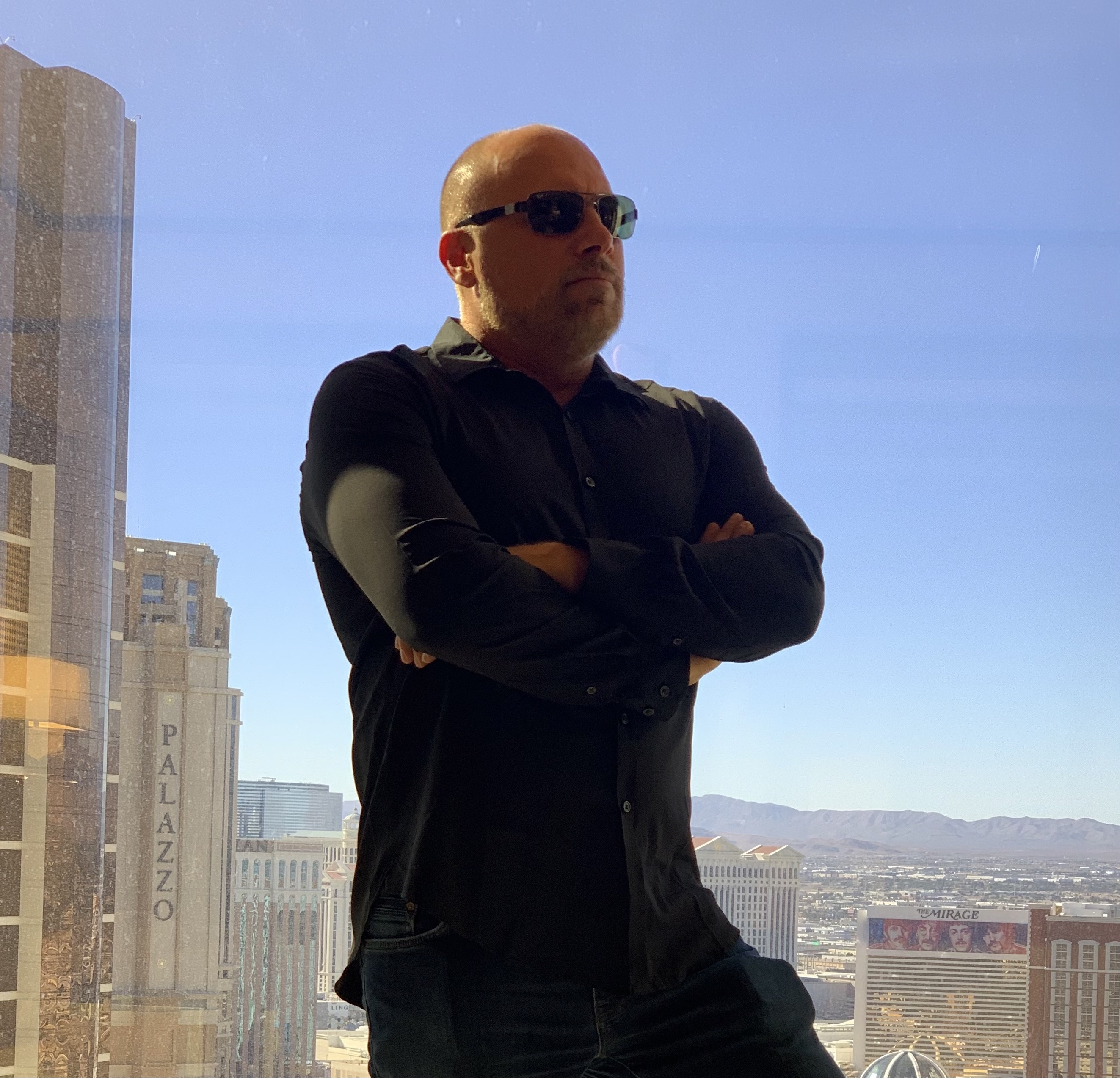
- Scott Feil, 2020
- Born: Scott Eric Feil; May 5, 1966 (age 59); Petaluma, CA
- Occupations: Founder - UMCC LLC, Business Owner, Cannabis activist
- Years active: 1980s–present
- Website: http://www.instagram.com/scottfeil

Scott Feil is an American medical cannabis rights activist, complex aircraft pilot, and businessman. Most known for his involvement in the continuing court case involving Los Angeles Police Department illegal seizure of 209 pounds (95 kg) of medical marijuana, 21 pounds (9.5 kg) of hashish, 12 pounds (5.4 kg) of marijuana oil and $186,416.00 from his Los Angeles based United Medical Caregivers Clinic medical cannabis dispensary, UMCC LLC.

== Legal battles ==
=== UMCC ===
In 2003 United Medical Caregivers Clinic Inc. opened its doors to medical patience of medical referrals. UMCC was working completely legal under the laws of Compassionate Use Act of 1996 otherwise known as prop 215. On March 15, 2005 LAPD Sergeant Miguel Lopez received complaints of marijuana smoking near the UMCC offices on Wilshire Boulevard. UMCC was raided by the LAPD seizing 209 pounds (95 kg) of medical marijuana, 21 pounds (9.5 kg) of hashish, 12 pounds (5.4 kg) of marijuana oil and all the collective members capitol reserves ($186,416.00). No criminal charges were filed because of Scott's declaration stating "All cannabis products obtained or produced by UMCC are only distributed to patient members of UMCC․, UMCC does not allow the distribution of cannabis products to non-patients or non-members." testimony in the state court connection to the motion was connected to all of the seized assets. Proceedings 9th Circuit Court of Appeals: UNITED STATES v. $186,416. Feil finally accepted a five year term in a federal prison camp after two years of threats from the government to incarcerate his wife and father in law to 10 years in prison.

=== Controversy ===
October 2009 published decision in the 186,416 v United States Case. Feil won that case. This win not only returned the money to Feil, but it set the legal precedent that illegally obtained warrants by local police that violated State laws would not be admissible as evidence in Federal cases. The Federal Government is continuing their case against Scott and the others related to UMCC, although now the government can't use any evidence to prosecute Mr. Feil because it has all been suppressed. On August 19, 2009 Feil once more entered a Federal courtroom now facing criminal charges for his involvement in UMCC.

Although medical marijuana is legal in California state law it still remains illegal in the United States federal law. Because there is no exception for medical marijuana distribution under the federal Controlled Substances Act, 21 U.S.C. §§ 801-971. However, to be classified under a schedule 1 drug, there is to be no known medical benefits. Ironically, Medical Marijuana is a schedule 1 drug, yet there are multiple medical benefits which marijuana provides. During the 2008 presidential campaign, when President Obama was asked about his stand on medical marijuana he did state he would not have the justice department prosecute medical marijuana patients. This included raids on businesses complying with the state laws. Attorney General Eric Holder's statement that the Drug Enforcement Administration would end its raids on state-approved marijuana dispensaries, Obama said during the presidential campaign that he supported the controlled use of marijuana for medical purposes, when attorney General Eric Holder was asked about medical marijuana policy in the US he replayed "What the president said during the campaign ... will be consistent with what we will be doing here in law enforcement," he said. "What (Obama) said during the campaign ... is now American policy."

== Early life ==
Scott grew up in Rohnert Park, California, Son of Walter and Mary Feil. His father was a truck driver of German descent.

== Later years ==
After Scott's release from Federal prison, he moved to Windsor, California and married his wife Laura Feil . He has 5 sons (Syth, Eric, Bryan, Peyton, Santiago) and 1 daughter (Sierra).

== Activist ==
After Scott's father passed his life took an immediate change in direction with a minor medical background and a large passion to help. He became an activist for patient safe access to alleviate pain and suffering.

Scott Feil has always been in full support of NORML and ASA with fundraisers and speaking at monthly meetings.

== See also ==
- Legal and medical status of cannabis
- Places that have decriminalized non-medical marijuana in the United States
- Removal of cannabis from Schedule I of the Controlled Substances Act
- Medical cannabis in the United States
- California Proposition 215 (1996)
