= Brownie Mary =

American medical cannabis activist (1922–1999)

- Brownie Mary speaking at People's Park, Berkeley, California, in 1995
- Born: Mary Jane Rathbun; December 22, 1922; Chicago, Illinois, United States
- Died: April 10, 1999 (aged 76); Forest Hill, San Francisco, California, United States
- Occupations: Hospital volunteer Cannabis activist Baker; Waitress
- Years active: 1984–1996
- Known for: Medical cannabis; Cannabis foods; AIDS activism
- Children: Peggy (1955–1974)

Mary Jane Rathbun (December 22, 1922 – April 10, 1999), popularly known as Brownie Mary, was an American medical cannabis rights activist. As a hospital volunteer at San Francisco General Hospital, she became known for baking and distributing cannabis brownies to AIDS patients. Along with activist Dennis Peron, Rathbun lobbied for the legalization of cannabis for medical use, and she helped pass San Francisco Proposition P (1991) and California Proposition 215 (1996) to achieve those goals. She also contributed to the establishment of the San Francisco Cannabis Buyers Club, the first medical cannabis dispensary in the United States.

Rathbun was arrested on three occasions, with each arrest bringing increased local, national, and international media attention to the medical cannabis movement. Her grandmotherly appearance generated public sympathy for her cause and undermined attempts by the district attorney's office to prosecute her for possession. The City of San Francisco eventually gave Rathbun permission to distribute cannabis brownies to people with AIDS. Her arrests generated interest in the medical community and motivated researchers to propose one of the first clinical trials to study the effects of cannabinoids in HIV-infected adults.

== Early life ==
Brownie Mary was born Mary Jane Rathbun in Chicago, Illinois, on December 22, 1922. Her mother, a conservative Irish Catholic, named her "Mary Jane". She was raised in Minneapolis, Minnesota, where she attended Catholic school. At the age of 13, she was involved in an altercation with a nun who tried to cane her, but Rathbun fought back. As a teenager, she moved out of her home and found a job as a waitress; she worked as a waitress for most of her adult life. Social activism appealed to her from a young age; she traveled from Chicago to Wisconsin to campaign for the right of miners to form unions. In the late 1940s, she worked as an activist promoting abortion rights for women in Minneapolis. During World War II, she moved to San Francisco, California, where she met a man at a United Service Organization (USO) dance. They married, but soon divorced. The marriage produced a daughter, Peggy, who was born in 1955. She later moved to Reno, Nevada, but after Peggy was killed by a drunk driver in a car accident in the early 1970s, Rathbun returned to San Francisco.

== Activism ==
=== 1974–1982; Peron, two arrests ===
Rathbun first met fellow activist Dennis Peron in 1974 in the Castro district at Cafe Flore, where they shared a joint. While working as a waitress at the International House of Pancakes, she earned extra money selling cannabis-laced brownies; she became known in the Castro for selling "magical brownies" out of a basket for several dollars each. Rathbun baked and sold cannabis brownies for profit out of her house. Mary would cook large pots of butter and cannabis slowly on the stove for hours in her little kitchen to infuse the butter herself to use in her "magical brownies". Peron also sold Rathbun's brownies at his Big Top pot supermarket on Castro Street. He was shot in the leg during a police raid on his business in 1977.

In the early 1980s, Rathbun was baking about 50 dozen cannabis brownies per day. She advertised her "original recipe brownies" on San Francisco bulletin boards, calling them "magically delicious". An undercover police officer discovered what she was doing, and on the night of January 14, 1981, police raided Rathbun's home and found more than 18 pounds (8.2 kg) of cannabis, 54 dozen cannabis brownies, and an assortment of other drugs. When Rathbun opened the door, she reportedly told the police, "I thought you guys were coming." She was 57 years old when she was first arrested. It was at this time that the media began calling her "Brownie Mary". She pleaded guilty to nine counts of possession and received three years probation. The judge also sentenced her to 500 hours of community service. Rathbun began working with the Shanti Project, a support group for people with HIV/AIDS. According to Peron:

Those first 500 hours she worked at a variety of places, from the gay thrift store to the Shanti project, doing her community service in record time—60 days. Although no longer obligated to do community service, she continued her work for St. Martin de Pores soup kitchen until 1982, when she joined the Shanti project, which was responding to the demands of the emerging AIDS crises. Mary had lost her only daughter in an auto accident ... and now she adopted every kid in San Francisco as her own.

Rathbun's brownie customers were mostly gay men. When they first began coming down with AIDS in the early 1980s, she noticed that cannabis helped them with the wasting syndrome; she also found this to be true of cancer patients. People donated cannabis to Rathbun and she began baking brownies in the hundreds and distributing them to sick people free of charge. Rathbun's monthly $650 Social Security check helped her to purchase baking supplies.

On December 7, 1982, Rathbun was walking down Market Street carrying a bag of brownies when she by chance met one of the officers who had originally arrested her in 1981. Rathbun was on her way to deliver cannabis brownies for a friend who had cancer and was suffering from the side effects of chemotherapy. The officer inquired as to the contents of her bag and found her in possession of four dozen cannabis brownies. She was taken to the city jail and held on multiple counts of possession and violation of her probation. The district attorney eventually dropped the charges.

=== 1984–1991; volunteerism, Proposition P ===
Beginning in 1984, Rathbun volunteered weekly in the AIDS ward (Ward 86) at San Francisco General Hospital (SFGH). According to Donald Abrams, "she used to wheel our patients to radiology [and] take their specimens to the lab". Ward 86 honored her with a "Volunteer of The Year" award in 1986. Author Carol Pogash profiled Rathbun's volunteer work at SFGH in her book, As Real As It Gets: The Life of a Hospital at the Center of the AIDS Epidemic (1992).

In New York in the early 1990s, Peron spoke at a meeting of the AIDS Coalition to Unleash Power (ACT UP) about the possible use of cannabis for the relief of AIDS symptoms. Multiple studies had demonstrated that cannabis could help with nausea and the loss of appetite suffered by patients undergoing therapy for diseases like cancer and AIDS. However, cannabis had been illegal in the United States since 1937. Classified under Schedule I of the Controlled Substances Act in 1970 as a drug that "has no currently accepted medical use in treatment in the United States", medicinal users of cannabis were subject to arrest.

In spite of a skeptical reception at his initial meeting with ACT UP, Peron persisted. He told Rathbun about ACT UP, and she later spoke to the group about her first-hand experience distributing cannabis-laced brownies to people with AIDS. Reporter Peter Gorman noted that this time "the reception was warmer, but still skeptical".

Rathbun helped work on Proposition P, which made it the policy of the City of San Francisco to recommend that the State of California and the California Medical Association make cannabis available for medicinal purposes and to protect physicians from penalties for prescribing medicinal cannabis. Proposition P passed with the support of 79 percent of San Francisco voters on November 5, 1991.

=== 1992–1997; third arrest, Proposition 215 ===
My kids need this and I'm ready to go to jail for my principles ... I'm not going to cut any deals with them. If I go to jail, I go to jail.

— Brownie Mary

Rathbun was arrested for a third time in Cazadero, California, on July 19, 1992, while pouring cannabis into brownie batter at the home of a grower. She was charged with possession of 2.5 pounds (1.1 kg) of cannabis and released on bail. The Sonoma County district attorney's office attempted to prosecute her in People v. Rathbun, bringing her case international media coverage. She pleaded not guilty to two counts of felony marijuana possession. Rathbun was acquitted of the charges. Attorney Norman Elliott Kent notes that Rathbun's legal defense relied on medical necessity, the same defense used by Robert Randall in United States v. Randall (1976). According to Kent, Rathbun "was able to testify that her deliveries were made to assist others in need, not to advance individual greed, that the nobility of her actions outweighed the reprehensibleness of her offense according to the law."

In August 1992, Rathbun testified about medical cannabis in a hearing held by the San Francisco Board of Supervisors. The Board passed a resolution making the arrest or prosecution of people in possession of or growing medical cannabis the "lowest priority". The Board recognized Rathbun's volunteer work at the hospital by declaring August 25 "Brownie Mary Day".

In September 1992, Rathbun joined ACT UP/DC at a protest in Washington, D.C., against the medical cannabis policies of the George H. W. Bush administration. The group delivered a letter to James O. Mason, head of the United States Public Health Service, requesting that people with AIDS receive immediate access to cannabis. After fourteen years of allowing a small group of individuals to use cannabis for medicinal purposes, Mason had terminated the federal government's Compassionate Investigational New Drug program (Compassionate IND) in March 1992. The Carter administration first established the Compassionate IND program in 1976 when Robert C. Randall successfully argued a medical necessity defense in United States v. Randall.

In addition to cancelling Compassionate IND, Mason made controversial comments about the program, arguing, among other things, that people with AIDS who used cannabis "might be less likely to practice safe ... sexual behavior." ACT UP/DC asked Mason to resign his post if he failed to meet their demands to restore access to cannabis. Brownies were served at the protest in honor of Rathbun, who had been arrested the month before and was now facing felony possession charges for distributing cannabis brownies to AIDS patients. Outside the Department of Health and Human Services, Rathbun invited Mason to "follow me around for two days as I visit my kids in the wards, and then see where he stands on this".

In 1992, Rathbun helped Peron open the San Francisco Cannabis Buyers Club, the first medical cannabis dispensary in the United States. In 1996, she and Peron campaigned on behalf of California Proposition 215, a statewide voter initiative that would allow patients to possess and cultivate cannabis for personal medical use with the recommendation of a physician. The initiative passed with more than 55 percent of the vote and became state law; other states have since passed similar legislation.

In 1997, she was honored as the grand marshal of the San Francisco Gay Pride Parade, along with Dennis Peron.

== Personal life ==
Rathbun often appeared in public wearing polyester pantsuits, and she was said to have a "sailor's mouth." Jane Meredith Adams of The Dallas Morning News observed that "four-letter words are an essential part of the vocabulary of Brownie Mary." Philosophically, she considered herself an anarchist and an atheist.

=== Illness and death ===
Rathbun suffered from chronic obstructive pulmonary disease and osteoarthritis. She survived colon cancer and walked with artificial knees. Rathbun often self-medicated by consuming half a cannabis brownie in the morning and another half in the afternoon to ease the pain of osteoarthritis in her knees. She claimed cannabis brownies allowed her to walk and helped her with her gout. By the spring of 1996, Rathbun was in extreme pain and was no longer able to bake. She began losing weight and told Peron that she considered traveling to Michigan for physician-assisted suicide at the hands of Jack Kevorkian. After suffering a fall in August 1998, Rathbun was admitted to Mount Zion Hospital for surgery on her neck and spine. She recovered from the operation at Davies Medical Center, but received few visitors. Later, she was confined to a bed at Laguna Honda Hospital, a nursing home for the poor. Rathbun died of a heart attack at age 76 on April 10, 1999. On April 17, 300 people, including her friend, district attorney Terence Hallinan, attended a candlelight vigil held in her honor in the Castro. Hallinan told a crowd of several hundred people gathered at her memorial that she was a hero who will "one day be remembered as the Florence Nightingale of the medical marijuana movement."

== Legacy ==
The Associated Press, United Press International, Reuters, and CNN distributed stories about Rathbun's arrests around the world and brought her campaign for access to medical cannabis to a wide audience. Her grandmotherly visage became the public face of the American medical cannabis movement in the early 1990s, winning support and sympathy for the movement. Support for Proposition P and California Proposition 215 gained momentum when her arrests were publicized. Rathbun and her court case in 1992 became, according to Jane Meredith Adams of The Dallas Morning News, "a cause célèbre for those fighting to legalize marijuana for medical use...a heroine to people with AIDS and cancer" and others. English news magazine The Economist attributed Rathbun's efforts at direct action on the issue to the change in electoral support for medical cannabis in the United States: "In 1996 California eased its law on the use of marijuana. The change allows a doctor in the state to prescribe the drug if he believes it will lessen a patient's pain. The relaxation in the public mood towards the use of marijuana was ascribed chiefly to Mary Jane Rathbun."

Rathbun's 1992 arrest caught the attention of her friend Donald Abrams, clinical professor at the University of California, San Francisco, and a physician at San Francisco General Hospital (SFGH). He was in Amsterdam attending an AIDS conference when he learned of Rathbun's arrest by way of CNN. Rick Doblin of the Multidisciplinary Association for Psychedelic Studies read about Rathbun's arrest in the newspaper. He sent a letter to the AIDS program at SFGH proposing that "Brownie Mary's institution" should consider conducting clinical trials of cannabis on the wasting syndrome in AIDS patients. Inspired by Rathbun's arrest, Abrams and Doblin collaborated to develop a protocol to test the effects of cannabis on appetite and body weight. Five years later, after two of their proposed studies were rejected by the National Institute on Drug Abuse (NIDA), their third research protocol, "Short-Term Effects of Cannabinoids in Patients with HIV-1 Infection", was finally approved in 1997. The study was funded with $978,000 from the National Institutes of Health with cannabis supplied by NIDA.

== Publications ==
- Burch, Claire. (2007). California Chronicles of Medical Marijuana. Regent Press. DVD.
- Rathbun, Mary; Dennis Peron (1996). Brownie Mary's Marijuana Cookbook and Dennis Peron's Recipe for Social Change. Trail of Smoke Publishing. ISBN 0-9639892-0-0.
- Rathbun, Mary. (April 17, 1993). 50th Anniversary of LSD: Marijuana and Medical Uses; Sacred and Healing Plants and Psychedelic Drugs in the Treatment of Substance Abuse. San Francisco Unitarian Center. (Audio/Video).

== General and cited references ==
- Abrams, D. (2002). "Cannabis Use with AIDS Patients". The Second National Clinical Conference on Cannabis Therapeutics. Patients Out of Time & Portland Community College Institute of Health Professionals.
- Adams, J. M. (1992, October 3). "Brownie Mary's recipe for controversy; AIDS sufferers praise her illegal help". The Dallas Morning News, p. 41A.
- Associated Press (1982a). "Brownies catch eye of police". The Deseret News, p. 6.
- Associated Press (1982b). "Brownie Mary arrested again". Merced Sun-Star, p. 25.
- Associated Press (1992a, November 15). "'Brownie Mary' claims medicinal pot use". The Prescott Courier, p. 5A.
- Associated Press (1992b, November 15). "'Brownie Mary' to Defend her Special Recipe". The Telegraph (Nashua), p. B4.
- Associated Press (2005, January 14). "Backissues: 1995 10 years ago today". Moscow-Pullman Daily News, p. 2A.
- Binder, M. (1992, August 1) "Marijuana Brownies for AIDS Victims is a Bust". All Things Considered. National Public Radio. Transcript.
- Board of Supervisors, City and County of San Francisco (August 24, 1992). Journal of Proceedings. 87 (34): 869.
- "'Brownie Mary' OK'd to Testify at Pot Trial". (1992b). San Jose Mercury News.
- Cooper, C. (1992). "Ban on Medicinal Pot Under Fire". The Sacramento Bee, p. A1.
- Costantinou, M. (1999, April 18). "Friends pay tribute to Brownie Mary's life". San Francisco Examiner.
- Garchik, L. (2004, March 26). "Column". San Francisco Chronicle, p. E22.
- Goldberg, C. (1996, July 6). "'Brownie Mary' Fights to Legalize Marijuana". The New York Times.
- Gonzales, R. (1999, April 12). "Profile: Mary Jane "Brownie Mary" Rathbun, who cooked marijuana brownies for the AIDS population of San Francisco, dies at age 77." All Things Considered. National Public Radio. Transcript.
- Gorman, P. (1993, January). "High Times Interview: Brownie Mary Rathbun". High Times.
- Grim, R. (2009). This Is Your Country on Drugs: The Secret History of Getting High in America. John Wiley & Sons, Inc. ISBN 0-470-64389-7.
- Hatfield, L. D. (1992, July 23). "Brownie Mary arrested again". San Francisco Examiner. A6.
- Hatfield, L. D. (1999, April 12). "Mary Rathbun- Brownie Mary". San Francisco Examiner.
- Herscher, E. (1992, August 5). "'Brownie Mary' Is Cheered During Testimony at City Hall". San Francisco Chronicle, p. A1.
- Holland, J. (2010). "Medical Marijuana Research: An Interview with Donald Abrams, M.D." The Pot Book: A Complete Guide to Cannabis. Park Street Press. ISBN 1-59477-368-8.
- Lee, M. A. (2012). Smoke Signals: A Social History of Marijuana - Medical, Recreational and Scientific. Simon and Schuster. ISBN 1-4391-2793-X.
- Lehrman, S. (1995, January 8) "U.S. drug agencies resist AIDS medicinal-pot plan". San Francisco Examiner.
- "Mary Jane Rathbun". (1999, April 22). The Economist. 351 (8116): 86.
- "Medical-Marijuana Creates Buzz at City Hall". (1992a, August 25). San Jose Mercury News.
- Reed, C. (1999, May 20). "'Brownie Mary' Rathbun". The Guardian.
- Russell, S. (2003). "Pioneering S.F. AIDS ward celebrates its first 20 years". San Francisco Chronicle, p. A19.
- Saxon, Wolfgang (1999, April 14). "Mary Jane Rathbun, 77, Baker Known for Marijuana Brownies". The New York Times. (Deprecated link archived 2013-01-30 at archive.today)
- Sloman, L. (1998). Reefer Madness: The History of Marijuana in America. Macmillan. ISBN 0-312-19523-0.
- Sheehy, J. (2000, July 13). "Marijuana does not appear to alter viral loads of HIV patients taking protease inhibitors". University of California, San Francisco.
- Torgoff, M. (2005). Can't Find My Way Home: America in the Great Stoned Age, 1945–2000. Simon and Schuster. ISBN 0-7432-5863-0.
- United Press International (1981, June 6). "'Brownie Mary' Ordered to Cook Legal Sweets". Lodi News-Sentinel, p. 2.
- Warren, M. (April 13, 1999). "'Brownie Mary' Rathbun, Who Gave Pot to AIDS Patients, Dies". The Columbian. Vancouver, WA. Archived from the original on November 15, 2018 – via HighBeam Research.
- Werner, C. A. (2001, March 4). "Medical Marijuana and the AIDS Crisis Archived 2018-10-21 at the Wayback Machine". J Cannabis Ther. (3/4): 17–33.
- Woo, E. (1999, April 13). "'Brownie Mary' Rathbun Dies; Advocated Medical Marijuana". Los Angeles Times. . Retrieved 2011-07-11.
