= James Pasqual Bettio =

American politician

James Pasqual Bettio is an American artist, photographer, educator, fashion designer, museum operator, and community organizer. He was a senator in the California Senior Legislature. He is the founder of the Park Labrea Arts Council. He attended the Brooks Institute of Photography beginning from 1960 to 1963, and received its Brooks Merit Achievement Award in 1967. He was named Photographer of the Year by the Professional Photographers of America, and was the historic youngest member named to the Royal Photographic Society. In 1970, he received the International Congress of Photographers award for artistic achievement, his 30th such international award as of that time.

He was recipient of Fellowship Royal Photographic Society of Great Britain in 1977. His photographs have appeared on covers of more than 100 national magazines.
