= Scott Imler =

Medical Marijuana lobbyist

Scott Tracy Imler
- Born: January 25, 1958; Missouri, U.S.
- Died: August 9, 2018 (aged 60); Los Angeles, California
- Years active: 1990s–2018
- Known for: Activism for legalizing cannabis

Scott Tracy Imler (1958-2018) was an American activist who advocated medical marijuana use in California. He worked with Dennis Peron, a fellow cannabis activist, during the movement for the legalization of marijuana in the 1990s. He was a co-author of Proposition 215 or the Compassionate Use Act of 1996, the law permitting medical marijuana in the state.

Imler was also a Methodist minister.

== Cannabis Movement ==
When California Governor Pete Wilson vetoed a bill legalizing marijuana in 1991, Imler worked with Peron and Dale Gieringer to establish a political action committee called Californians for Compassionate Use. In 1992, he was first prompted by Peron to file an initiative in Santa Cruz similar to Proposition P, a resolution calling on the state government to permit medical cannabis within San Francisco. This resolution, which was called Measure A, became the second local medical marijuana initiative approved in California after Peron's proposition. The PAC next sought to expand its initiative and launched a voter-led referendum for entire California also known as Proposition 215. It initially encountered problems until it gained traction with the support of philanthropists such as George Soros, Peter Lewis, and George Zimmer. The initiative was passed on November 5, 1996, making California the first US state to legalize marijuana use.

One of Imler's earliest initiatives that contributed to the cannabis movement in California was the establishment of a center that raised and dispensed marijuana for medical use by AIDS and cancer patients. The initiative directly impacted Imler since cannabis was also used to treat glaucoma and epileptic spells, illnesses that he suffered. Through the help of defense attorney John Duran, who later became West Hollywood mayor), this became the Los Angeles Cannabis Resource Center, the first patient-based medical marijuana cooperative in southern California. By 2001, the facility had served about 900 members. The co-op operated until Imler announced its closure in the same year. This development came after the DEA raided LACRC, which also incited a Federal backlash against medical marijuana use. The raid was carried out three weeks after the 9/11 terror attacks. Imler was prosecuted but was never jailed.

Imler was an ordained minister and the pastor of the Methodist Church located at the Fountain and Fairfax in West Hollywood. The church also served as a dispensary and "sanctuary" for those who wanted to receive and use medicinal marijuana.

Imler was married to George Leddy for 30 years. He died on August 9, 2018.
