= Elvy Musikka =

American cannabis rights activist

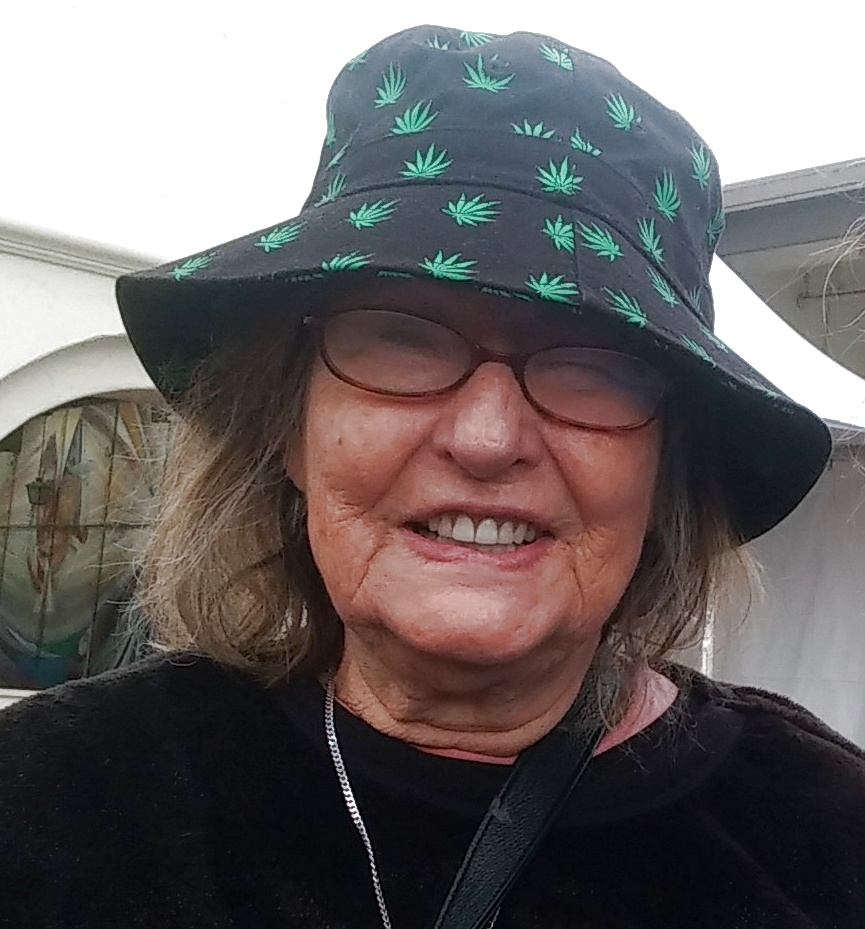
- Elvy Musikka at the 2018 Emerald Cup
- Born: August 10, 1939 (age 86); Cali, Colombia
- Occupations: Musician, Activist
- Known for: Medical marijuana patients’ rights

Elvy Musikka (born August 10, 1939) is an American cannabis rights activist.

== Life and activism ==
Elvy Musikka is one of three surviving patients qualified to enroll in the Compassionate Investigational New Drug Program, getting medical marijuana from the U.S. federal government.

Born in Colombia with congenital cataracts that severely limited her vision, Musikka underwent a series of surgeries both in her home country and in the US. Her condition was compounded by a diagnosis of glaucoma in the 1970s, after which a doctor advised her to try marijuana to lower her eye pressure and preserve what was left of her vision.

In 1988, Musikka was arrested for growing a few marijuana plants in her backyard in Hollywood, Florida. Facing a five-year jail sentence, she stood her ground and was defended by activist attorney Norm Kent at a trial where her doctor and activist Robert Randall, also a glaucoma sufferer, testified. The judge found her not guilty due to medical necessity. Shortly thereafter, Musikka was accepted into the federal IND (Investigational New Drug) program, which began to provide her monthly tins containing 300 joints grown at a government farm in Mississippi.

Musikka’s case earned international headlines and she soon was recruited to join Journeys for Justice and the Cannabis Action Network, appearing at pro-pot rallies across the country. She has also traveled internationally, appearing at events in Mexico, Colombia, Amsterdam, Australia, and Scandinavia.

Musikka was active in California campaigning for Proposition 215 in 1996 for medical marijuana patients’ rights, and also campaigned for reform measures in Oregon. She has worked with many of the key players in the marijuana reform movement, like Jack Herer, and attended and spoke at Seattle Hempfest, The High Times Cannabis Cup in Amsterdam, and the Million Marijuana March in New York City. She has won several awards for her activism.

Musikka has made regular appearances on television and provided interviews to newspapers across the United States. Due to her status as a research participant, Musikka was able to openly discuss her marijuana use publicly without the risk of legal consequences.

Musikka wrote and recorded many pro-hemp songs that she performed at rallies across the United States and world.

Musikka resides in Eugene, Oregon, and served on the board of advisors of Voter Power.

== Personal life ==
Born in Colombia to a Colombian mother and a Norwegian/Finnish father, Elvy’s family moved to New York City to live with her stepfather after her father died. Having limited vision since childhood, music became a big part of her life. She had a broad set of musical influences, as well as being president of the Eddie Fisher fan club in her school. For her sophomore year of high school, she lived in Puerto Rico, where she was a DJ with her own radio show. She finished high school in Florida, where she later married and had children, and a career at the phone company and in banking.

== Awards and recognition ==
Musikka was named High Times magazine's 1992 Freedom Fighter of the Year at the Cannabis Cup in Amsterdam. In 2003, she was given NORML’s Outstanding Cannabis Advocate Award for Advancing the Cause of Marijuana Law Reform.
