= Robert C. Randall =

American cannabis rights activist

- Born: Robert C. Randall; 1948
- Died: June 2, 2001 (aged 53); Sarasota, Florida
- Occupation: College professor
- Years active: 1975–2001
- Known for: Medical marijuana patients’ rights
- Notable work: Marijuana & AIDS: Pot, Politics, and PWAs in America, Marijuana Rx: The Patients Fight for Medical Pot

Robert C. Randall (1948 – June 2, 2001) was an American advocate for medical marijuana and the founder of Alliance for Cannabis Therapeutics.

== Life and activism ==
Robert Randall was the first legal medical marijuana smoker in the United States since 1937. Randall successfully used a medical necessity defense when he was charged with illegal possession of cannabis to treat his glaucoma. The case, United States v. Randall (1976), is "The first successful articulation of the medical necessity defense in the history of the common law, and indeed, the first case to extend the necessity defense to the crimes of possession or cultivation of marijuana".

Upon being declared not guilty for reason of medical necessity, the federal government then granted his petition to gain access to supplies of marijuana used in federal research programs. Randall had his medication provided to him by a doctor at the Howard University Hospital.

From 1978 to 1981 Randall and his wife, Alice O’Leary, worked with patients across the country who experienced the therapeutic benefits of cannabis. In 1981 the couple founded the Alliance for Marijuana Therapeutics which was the leading party during rescheduling hearings before the Administrative Law Judge in front of the DEA.

In the 1990s Randall started the Marijuana AIDS Research Service (MARS), which helped AIDS patients apply for the FDA program providing marijuana for medical use. Despite initial approval for the program it was ultimately cut. Closing this program led activists to shift gears and sponsor various State ballot initiatives.

== Writings ==
Randall, who wrote Marijuana & AIDS: Pot, Politics, and PWAs in America, also documented his accounts in his book, co-written with his wife Alice O'Leary: Marijuana Rx: The Patients' Fight for Medical Pot, ISBN 978-1560251668.

== See also ==
- Compassionate Investigational New Drug program
