= California Senior Legislature =

The California Senior Legislature (CSL) is a volunteer body meeting for three days each year to propose legislation regarding senior citizens at both state and federal levels. Meetings are held in the California State Capitol building for three days usually in late October. It was created from an idea by California State Senator Henry Mello, who called for a meeting of a “Silver-Haired Legislature”in 1980. It first met in 1982. There are 40 Senior Senators and 80 Senior Assembly members. These are selected through elections in 33 planning service areas, as established by the Federal Older Americans Act of 1965. The session meets to arrive at ten state and four federal proposals. These are then taken to state legislators or members of congress, who are asked to author and carry appropriate bills in the Legislature or the United States Congress. 80-85% of the bills proposed are endorsed and carried. Voluntary tax-deductible donations on the California state income tax form 540 finance the California Senior Legislature.
