= 1996 California Proposition 215 =

California law permitting medical marijuana

Proposition 215
- November 5, 1996
- Compassionate Use Act of 1996

Results
Choice	Votes	%
Yes	5,382,915	55.58%
No	4,301,960	44.42%
Valid votes	9,684,875	94.36%
Invalid or blank votes	578,615	5.64%
Total votes	10,263,490	100.00%
Registered voters/turnout	15,662,075	65.53%
- For 50%–60% 60%–70% 70%–80% 80%–90% Against 50%–60% 60%–70%

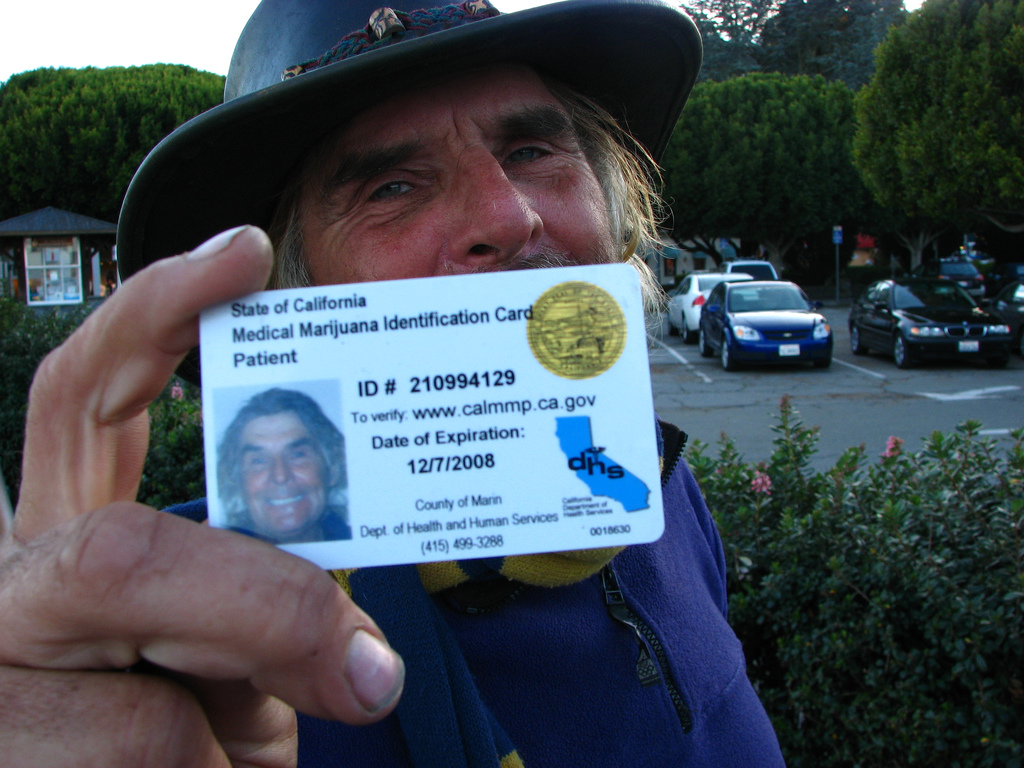
Medical cannabis card in Marin County, California

Proposition 215, or the Compassionate Use Act of 1996, is a California law permitting the use of medical cannabis despite marijuana's lack of the normal Food and Drug Administration testing for safety and efficacy. It was enacted, on November 5, 1996, by means of the initiative process, and passed with 5,382,915 (55.6%) votes in favor and 4,301,960 (44.4%) against.

The proposition was a statewide voter initiative authored by Dennis Peron, Anna Boyce RN, John Entwistle, Jr., Valerie Corral, Dale Gieringer, Attorney William Panzer, medical marijuana activist and founder of the L.A. Cannabis Resource Center Scott Tracy Imler, attorney Leo Paoli and psychiatrist Tod H. Mikuriya, and approved by California voters. It allows patients with a valid doctor's recommendation, and the patients' designated Primary Caregivers, to possess and cultivate marijuana for personal medical use, and has since been expanded to protect a growing system of collective and cooperative distribution. The Act added Section 11362.5 to the California Health and Safety Code. California Proposition 215 was the first medical marijuana ballot initiative passed at the state level; causing a conflict in the United States between states' rights advocates and those who support a stronger federal presence.

== Yes on 215 Campaign ==
Proposition 215 was conceived by San Francisco marijuana activist Dennis Peron in memory of his partner, Jonathan West, who had used marijuana to treat symptoms of AIDS. In 1991, Peron organized Proposition P, the San Francisco medical marijuana initiative, which passed with 79% of the vote. Prop P did not have force of law, but was simply a resolution declaring the city's support for medical marijuana. Santa Cruz and other cities followed suit with similar measures endorsing medical use of marijuana. The California legislature went on to approve medical marijuana bills advocated by Anna Boyce within the California Senior Legislature and supported by State Senator Milton Marks and Assemblyman John Vasconcellos, but they were vetoed by Governor Pete Wilson. Dennis Peron, suffering from his own personal ill health, worked closely with Dr. Tod Mikuriya to organize Proposition 215. Dr. Mikuriya had worked to decriminalize cannabis and declassify cannabis as a Schedule I controlled substance. Dr. Mikuriya spoke worldwide during the 1980s and 1990s in an effort to garner support for the medical use of cannabis. Threats to Dennis Peron would cause Peron to leave the United States following the passage of Proposition 215. Meanwhile, the federal government's interagency Task Force, in conjunction with the resources of California's Attorney General and California's Medical Board, pursued any physician willing to recommend cannabis for medicinal reasons. More than 15 medical doctors would be forced to fight to keep their medical licenses.

Frustrated by the Governor's veto and by the Clinton administration's ongoing refusal to allow medical marijuana, Peron decided to turn to the voters. In 1995, Peron, Gieringer and Imler organized Californians for Compassionate Use, a PAC dedicated to putting medical marijuana on the ballot. Chuck Blitz, a "social-justice entrepreneur", arranged a retreat in Santa Barbara in order to organize the movement. In attendance were Peron, seniors who advocated for medical marijuana through the Senior Legislature, philanthropists including Peter Lewis and George Zimmer, Ethan Nadelmann, who worked to fundraise from philanthropists including George Soros, and "political pros" including Bill Zimmerman, who had not worked on Drug War issues before but had notable success in getting ballot initiatives to approve liberal policies. Lewis offered to donate $50,000 if Gieringer could find nine other donors to match his contribution. However, Peron did not accept this offer, believing his group of activists could collect the 500,000 signatures necessary to get the initiative on the ballot themselves. Peron continued to deny help from fundraisers and advocates like Nadelmann until January 1995. At this point, Zimmerman estimated that the campaign would need nearly $2 million to get the signatures and continue the campaign. Nadelmann organized the fundraising, with Soros, Lewis, and Zimmer donating $500,000 each and Laurence Rockefeller, who had recently fell victim to a ponzi scheme, donating $50,000. From that point forward, Zimmerman lead the campaign and shifted the image of the campaign from potentially controversial figures like Peron to doctors and patients.

The opposition campaign to Proposition 215 included a wide variety of law enforcement, drug prevention groups, and elected officials, including three former Presidents and California Attorney General Dan Lungren. Ballot arguments against the proposition were signed by prominent prosecutors and law enforcement officials who claimed that, while appearing well-intentioned, it was an overly vague, bad law that, "allows unlimited quantities of marijuana to be grown anywhere ... in backyards or near schoolyards without any regulations or restrictions," and that it effectively legalized marijuana.

Ballot arguments in support were signed by prominent oncologists, a cancer survivor, a nurse, and two politicians, Assemblyman John Vasconcellos and San Francisco District Attorney Terence Hallinan, who wrote that he supported Prop 215 because he didn't "want to send cancer patients to jail for using marijuana".

The lead-up to the election saw a series of media-based attacks attempting to make the Yes on 215 Campaign a referendum on the controversial headquarters for the initiative, Dennis Peron's San Francisco Cannabis Buyer's Club. The very first of what would become more than 400 in the state, the SFCBC was a five-story full service medical marijuana club where qualified patients could in fact obtain marijuana for medical purposes (in various forms and qualities) in a retail setting. Far more than just a safe place for patients to consume, the club was a cultural center for many purposes.

Dennis Peron would describe 1996 as a year when "the stars aligned for medical marijuana". It was a presidential election year with a Democratic incumbent in a heavily Democratic state. The AIDS epidemic in the late 1980s to the early 1990s as well as recent studies regarding relief for chemotherapy patients were opening people's minds to medical marijuana. On top of that, 60-year-old "Brownie" Mary Rathbun's arrest for baking marijuana brownies made headlines garnering sympathy for medical marijuana.

Proposition 215 passed with 55.6% support, setting off a chain reaction across North America of medical marijuana legislation. Canada now also has federal medical marijuana legislation and also operates a medical marijuana program through Health Canada (which also involves the issuance of ID cards, issuance of recommendations by physicians and maintenance of patient records), although not completely identical to that of the state of California. The issue has also been to the floor of the US Congress in the form of the Hinchey-Rohrbacher Amendment, the Truth in Trials Act, and the States Right to Medical Marijuana Act. None of this legislation succeeded in the U.S. Congress.

== Results ==
Proposition 215
Choice	Votes	%
For	5,382,915	55.58
Against	4,301,960	44.42
Total	9,684,875	100.00
Valid votes	9,684,875	94.36
Invalid/blank votes	578,615	5.64
Total votes	10,263,490	100.00
Registered voters/turnout	15,662,075	65.53

== Protections afforded by Proposition 215 ==
Proposition 215 added Section 11362.5 to the California Health and Safety Code, which:

- Exempts patients and defined caregivers who possess or cultivate marijuana recommended by a physician from criminal laws which otherwise prohibit possession or cultivation of marijuana.
- Provides physicians who recommend use of marijuana for medical treatment shall not be punished or denied any right or privilege.
- Declares that the measure is not to be construed to supersede prohibitions of conduct endangering others or to condone diversion of marijuana.

== Implementation and effect ==
California counties accepting applications for medical marijuana as of March 2010

The initiative was partially implemented through the California Medical Marijuana Program created by Senate Bill 420. Both San Diego County and San Bernardino County initially refused to implement the program, but were rebuffed by the California Supreme Court. San Diego County has since proposed County regulations allowing 36 marijuana dispensaries to operate within its jurisdiction. Implementation across the State varied widely; urban areas in Northern California were the center of California's fledgling marijuana market, while rural areas like Mendocino County, Santa Cruz, and Humboldt saw county-sanctioned gardens and patient registration programs.

Though medical marijuana was legalized and accepted by the majority of California voters, Proposition 215 does not supersede federal law. Marijuana is still illegal under federal law which causes a conflict between the state and the U.S. Government. City of Garden Grove v. Superior Court, a published California Court of Appeal decision (which in California is binding on all courts), upheld a decision of a trial court to "[order] the Garden Grove Police Department to give [Felix Kha] back his marijuana" stating "[b]ecause the act is strictly a federal offense, the state has 'no power to punish ... [it] ... as such.'"

Concerning limits on possession created by Senate Bill 420, the California Supreme Court decision People v. Kelly decided multiple issues. First, it reiterated that "unlike [Proposition 215], which did not immunize medical marijuana users from arrest but instead provided a limited 'immunity' defense to prosecution under state law for cultivation or possession of marijuana [citation], the MMP's identification card system is designed to protect against unnecessary arrest." Secondly, it agreed with both Kelly and the California Attorney General that the limits were an "unconstitutionally amendatory insofar as it limits an in-court CUA defense" but by providing more rights, not less, the section concerning limits on possession "should remain an enforceable part of the MMP, applicable to the extent possible — including to those persons who voluntarily participate in the program by registering and obtaining identification cards that provide protection against arrest."

In 2009, Oakland became the first U.S city to put a tax on marijuana. Approved by voters by a margin of 80%, the measure puts an $18 tax on every $1,000 in gross marijuana sales. The tax is estimated to bring in $300,000 to $1,000,000 annually.

The California Medical Board prosecuted many California licensed physicians for recommending cannabis under Proposition 215, in an attempt to harm them and take away their licenses to practice medicine despite the clear language of Proposition 215. In a major case against Dr. Tod Mikuriya that went to trial before an Administrative Law Judge in 2002, the Judge decreed that physicians recommending medical cannabis must first do a full physical exam and review all medical tests and information pertinent to the patient despite anecdotal evidence that the patient's self-medication was helpful or needed. The administrative law judge rendering the decision was a director of an organization actively trying to prevent the use of cannabis by persons who were prisoners or criminal defendants.

== Federal enforcement in California ==
Since the passage of Proposition 215, federal officials have tried various approaches – from criminal raids and prosecutions to civil injunctions to threatening to seize any property leased for medical cannabis uses – to thwart or slow the progress of medical cannabis in California. On December 30, 1996, Clinton administration officials including Donna Shalala and Janet Reno as well as Drug Czar Barry McCaffrey held a press conference announcing their intention to prosecute all involved in the prescribing of medical marijuana. Dan Abrahamson, legal director of the Lindesmith Center, recruited Graham Boyd to oppose the federal government's stance. Boyd worked with the ACLU of Northern California and sued the federal government for violating doctor's and patient's first amendment rights. Boyd and the ACLU won the case in federal court and the court of appeals. In 2003, the Supreme Court refused to hear the government appeal. According to Ethan Nadelmann, "If we had lost that battle, we wouldn't be having this conversation today," referring to a discussion of the success of medical marijuana initiatives across the country.

It was not until March 2009 that federal officials announced that they would no longer try to thwart medical marijuana distribution/use in California.

During his campaign, President Barack Obama signaled that he would cease the DEA's raids in California as President. On March 18, 2009, Attorney General Eric Holder announced "a shift in the enforcement of federal drug laws, saying the administration would effectively end the Bush administration's frequent raids on distributors of medical marijuana."

Previously, under Presidents Bill Clinton and George W. Bush, the United States Department of Justice had taken drastically different approaches to medical cannabis in California. The DOJ under Clinton limited its enforcement to civil measures, such as seeking to revoke the federal prescription licenses of doctors who recommended cannabis or filing for civil injunctions against the major providers under Proposition 215.

Author, activist, and grower "Ask Ed" Rosenthal (of High Times fame) was raided and charged by federal agents the same day DEA Administrator (and later Governor of Arkansas) Asa Hutchinson made a speech to the Commonwealth Club. With local permission, Rosenthal was cultivating marijuana "clones" (or cuttings) to be distributed to Bay Area medical marijuana clubs. The presiding judge, Charles Breyer, did not allow any testimony that would have substantiated what Rosenthal was doing was legal under state law, or that he was doing it with the sanction and knowledge of local officials. The only exception to this was when Judge Breyer allowed the defense to call then Oakland City Council member Nate Miley as a witness to testify that he had been to and inspected the warehouse where Rosenthal was cultivating.

Such incidents (and the fact that Rosenthal was taking the case to trial while making no clear attempt to prove that he wasn't growing the marijuana) led the jury to suspect they didn't have all the facts. Nonetheless, the jury convicted Rosenthal on all counts. Once released from sequestering, nine of the twelve jurors held a press conference publicly recanting their verdict and asking for leniency in sentencing. The jurors even attended the sentencing hearing, sitting with the defendant they had just convicted. Judge Breyer departed from the 10 Year Mandatory Minimum Sentence and shocked prosecutors by sentencing Rosenthal to 1 day in prison, with credit for time served. Rosenthal would eventually win an appeal only to be retried and re-convicted. He is planning another appeal.

During the Bush Administration, federal officials stepped up the crackdown on medical marijuana in California. There are currently more than 100 people facing federal charges in medical cannabis cases, and the DEA conducted more than 50 raids in 2007 alone. The DEA has also begun threatening landlords who lease to marijuana clubs with Asset Forfeiture, a technique where real property can be seized by the federal government if used in the commission of a drug crime. While DEA agents claim they are merely upholding federal law and only going after "major traffickers", advocates claim the DEA targets the most prominent political activists with their raids. Media reports have called federal enforcement in California "notably erratic".

On June 12, 2009, a federal court handed down a sentence to Charles Lynch for a raid that occurred at his Central California medical marijuana dispensary in 2007. The federal judge sentenced Lynch to a year and a day in prison.

Despite statements as a Senator, where Obama called for marijuana decriminalization, promises as a presidential candidate where he stated that marijuana laws needed to be reconsidered and explicit statements as president that he would respect state medical marijuana laws, Barack Obama has presided over 1.7 million arrests for nonviolent drug offenses, over half of these being marijuana arrests, and a nationwide campaign of raiding medical marijuana dispensaries. Dozens of dispensaries have been closed with their owners and workers facing jail and prison sentences. California has been especially hard hit, with numerous dispensary closures and arrests.

In what may be a shift in federal enforcement attitude, especially in those states where it's legal or decriminalized, President Obama made clear, in January 2014 that he feels cannabis is not as dangerous as alcohol.

== Guidelines ==
According to the California Department of Justice, qualified patients and caregivers may possess 8 ounces of dried marijuana, as long as they possess a state-issued identification card. However, Cal. Health and Safety Code Section 1362.77 does not require a state-issued identification card. Under the Health and Safety Code, a card holder or "qualified patient" (one possessing a doctor's recommendation) may possess up to eight oz. of dried herb, plus six mature or 12 immature plants. The state-issued identification card is for the patients' convenience only and is not required. Further, if the recommending physician indicates that a given patient requires more than the prescribed limits, that patient may possess an amount "consistent with that patient's needs."

In addition, marijuana smoking is also restricted by location. It may not be smoked wherever smoking is prohibited by law, within 1000 feet of a school, recreation center, or youth center, on a school bus, or in a moving vehicle or boat. According to Cal. Health and Safety Code Section 1362.785 Medical Marijuana use is not required to be accommodated inside the workplace or in any type of correctional facilities or during work hours. Under the Fair Employment and Housing Act, an employer may terminate an employee who tests positive for marijuana use.

== Proposition 215 and the federal courts ==
The U.S. Supreme Court has twice upheld the ability of federal officials to enforce federal law which conflicts with state law.

In 2001, the Oakland Cannabis Buyers' Cooperative claimed "medical necessity" as their legal justification for violating the federal Controlled Substances Act (CSA). The U.S. Supreme Court struck down this argument, holding there could be no claim of medical necessity because in the CSA Congress had specifically negated this defense by unambiguously classifying marijuana as a substance which can have no authorized medical use.

The 2005 case of Gonzales v. Raich challenged the CSA by claiming that simple cultivation of marijuana plants fell outside of Congress's power to regulate economic activity through its Commerce Clause powers. While initially successful in the Ninth Circuit, the U.S. Supreme Court struck down this argument. The Court found that personal cultivation of marijuana fell within the scope of federal regulation by employing an expansive definition of economic activity, a definition described as "breathtaking" by Justice O'Connor in her dissent because it "threatens to sweep all of productive human activity into federal regulatory reach". However, in the majority opinion Justice Stevens expressed, though denying them support at that time, that he hoped "the voices of voters allied with these respondents may one day be heard in the halls of Congress." Justice O'Connor in her dissenting opinion also stated that "a single courageous State may, if its citizens choose, serve as a laboratory; and try novel social and economic experiments," and that "[t]his case exemplifies the role of states as laboratories." Justice O'Connor disagreed with the majority's opinion because sanctioning this application of Congress's CSA "extinguishes that experiment, without any proof that the personal cultivation, possession, and use of marijuana for medicinal purposes, if economic activity in the first place, has a substantial effect on interstate commerce and is therefore an appropriate subject of federal regulation". Despite the dissent's favorable attitude toward state medical marijuana policies, federal law still controls, and for medical marijuana to be considered legal, change must be effected through legislation by Congress.

The U.S. Supreme Court on May 18, 2009 refused to hear San Diego's case against California, where it claimed it wasn't required to issue state-mandated medical marijuana IDs because the federal ban on marijuana trumped California's law.

== See also ==
- Cannabis in California
- Drug policy of California
- Medical cannabis
- Controlled Substances Act
- Cannabis Buyers Club
- Colorado Amendment 44 (2006)
- Campaign Against Marijuana Planting
- NORML
- California Proposition 36 (2000)
- California Proposition 5 (2008)
- California Proposition 19 (2010)
- California Assembly Bill 390
- Scott Feil
