= Dennis Peron =

American marijuana activist (1945–2018)

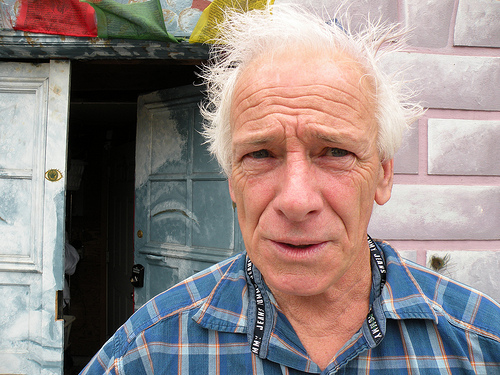
- Peron in 2008
- Born: April 8, 1945; The Bronx, New York City, New York, U.S.
- Died: January 27, 2018 (aged 72); San Francisco, California, U.S.
- Years active: 1970s–2018
- Known for: Activism for legalizing cannabis

Dennis Robert Peron (April 8, 1945 – January 27, 2018) was an American activist and businessman who became a leader in the movement for the legalization of cannabis throughout the 1990s. He influenced many in California and thus changed the political debate on marijuana in the United States.

== Biography ==
Peron was born in The Bronx, New York City, into an Italian-American family and grew up in Long Island. He served in the United States Air Force in Vietnam during the Tet Offensive.

After the war, he moved to the Castro District, San Francisco, where he became an active Yippie and organized smoke-ins. He also supported gay activist Harvey Milk, a former Long Island resident, who won an elected seat on the San Francisco Board of Supervisors in 1977.

=== Cannabis activism ===
Peron sold cannabis from storefronts in the Castro District and advocated for medical cannabis, as he saw how patients with AIDS benefited from it. His partner, Jonathan West, whom he met in San Francisco, died of AIDS in 1990. In 1991, Peron organized for the passage of San Francisco's Proposition P, a resolution calling on the state government to permit medical cannabis, which received 79% of the vote. That same year, he co-founded the San Francisco Cannabis Buyers Club, the first public cannabis dispensary. His businesses were raided by authorities in 1978 and 1990. In 1993, Peron and Brownie Mary jointly released a cookbook with recipes for cannabis edibles.

In 1996, Peron coauthored California Proposition 215, which sought to allow the use of medical cannabis. Dan Lungren, the Attorney General of California, ordered a police raid of Peron's club a month before the election, arresting Peron. Peron worked with other activists such as Scott Imler and Valerie Corral. Proposition 215 was passed soon thereafter, which allowed the club to reopen. Later in 1996, the Grassroots Party fielded Peron as their nominee, in the U.S. presidential election. Peron was on the ballot in Minnesota and Vermont, and received 5,400 votes. In 1998, Peron ran in the Republican primary for California governor against Lungren, who won the primary and lost the election to Gray Davis.

Peron voiced support for decriminalization of all marijuana use, believing that it is medicinal. He opposed medical marijuana use for children. Peron opposed California Proposition 19 in 2010, which would have legalized recreational cannabis, because he did not believe that recreational use exists, as all people who use marijuana are using it medicinally. He opposed California Proposition 64 in 2016.

=== Later life ===
Later in life, Peron owned and operated a 20-acre (8.1 ha) cannabis farm near Clearlake, California. San Francisco's Board of Supervisors recognized Peron, who was suffering with late-stage lung cancer, with a certificate of honor in 2017. Supervisor Jeff Sheehy called Peron "the father of medical cannabis". On January 27, 2018, aged 72, Peron died of lung cancer at the Veteran's Administration Health Center in San Francisco.

== Dennis Peron Award ==
In 2013, an award for life achievements was given posthumously to Dennis Peron at the Emerald Cup, because "The marijuana legalization movement would not have achieved its great breakthrough in 1996 had it not been for Dennis". In subsequent years, a "Dennis Peron Award" has been awarded at different events to a series of prominent medical cannabis activists, honoring the leadership of veteran cannabis entrepreneurs, like Wanda James or Etienne Fontan.
