= San Francisco Cannabis Buyers Club =

First public medical cannabis dispensary in the United States

The San Francisco Cannabis Buyers Club was the first public medical cannabis dispensary in the United States. Gay rights and AIDS activists were responsible for its founding and the larger success of the buyers club movement in the 1990s. (See also, the Wikipedia entries for “Brownie Mary” Rathburn and Dennis Peron.) Historically, the buyers club model emerged partly in response to the global pandemic of HIV/AIDS, and the failure of the U.S. government to allow the gay community and people suffering from other illnesses such as cancer, to legally use cannabis as palliative medicine. The club operated intermittently in at least three separate locations from 1991 to 1998, when it was permanently closed.

== Background ==
In the 1970s, Dennis Peron was an advocate for cannabis legalization and an activist for gay rights. Originally from New York, he served in Vietnam, came out as a gay man, and moved to California. He sold cannabis in the Castro in an underground market known as the "Big Top". Peron's interest in cannabis legal reform and gay rights became focused into a single movement as the global pandemic of HIV/AIDS, which began in 1981, began to impact the gay community. According to legal scholar Lewis A. Grossman, Peron "learned that people with AIDS smoked marijuana to combat the anorexia, nausea, wasting syndrome, and pain that accompanied the disease and its pharmaceutical treatments."

AIDS began to change the way Peron viewed cannabis. He began helping patients by secretly bringing cannabis into the AIDS ward. His transformation into a medical cannabis activist occurred in 1990, after his lover, Jonathan West, was sick from AIDS and was using cannabis to mitigate his symptoms. The police raided their house and arrested Peron. West testified on Peron's behalf by claiming the cannabis was his own and the charges were dismissed. West died a week later. Propelled into action, Peron helped author and pass Proposition P, which defended the use of medical cannabis by prescription. In November 1991, the bill passed with 80% support. According to Allen St. Pierre, gay rights and AIDS activists played a central role in the medical cannabis and buyers club movement.

In the United States, Ronald Reagan who served as president from 1981 to 1989, was accused of ignoring AIDS and being slow to respond to the crisis. His vice president, George H. W. Bush, would later go on to be president himself from 1989 to 1993. Operating under the Bush administration, James O. Mason, chief of the Public Health Service, ended a federal program that provided medical cannabis free of charge to sick Americans. Bill Clinton served as president from 1993 to 2001, during which time his administration rejected therapeutic cannabis research, with Donna Shalala, Secretary of Health and Human Services, reaffirming that "All available research has concluded that marijuana is dangerous to our health." Attorney General Janet Reno also threatened physicians with potential criminal charges for writing prescriptions for cannabis.

== History ==
The San Francisco Cannabis Buyers Club was founded by Dennis Peron in 1991. Peron began operating it out of his apartment on Sanchez Street in October of that year. Fred Gardner notes that "Dennis had three quarters of a pound, which he said he would provide to people who needed it for medical reasons —and free to those who couldn’t afford it."

In 1993, Peron rented a larger space above a bar at Church and Market, and the store opened in early 1994.

The third location operated out of the "Brownie Mary Building" at 1444 Market Street, a five floor commercial space in downtown San Francisco. It had a menu which included edibles and loose marijuana. Membership in the club exceeded 8,000 at one point and required a doctor's note certifying the patient had AIDS, cancer, or other condition for which cannabis could be used to alleviate pain.

The club was raided in 1996 by California Attorney General Dan Lungren. It later reopened only to be shutdown permanently, again by Lungren, on May 25, 1998.

== See also ==
- Berkeley Patients Group
- Cannabis in California and Drug policy of California
- Cannabis in the United States and its legal history
