= Ed Rosenthal =

American horticulturist, author, publisher, and cannabis grower

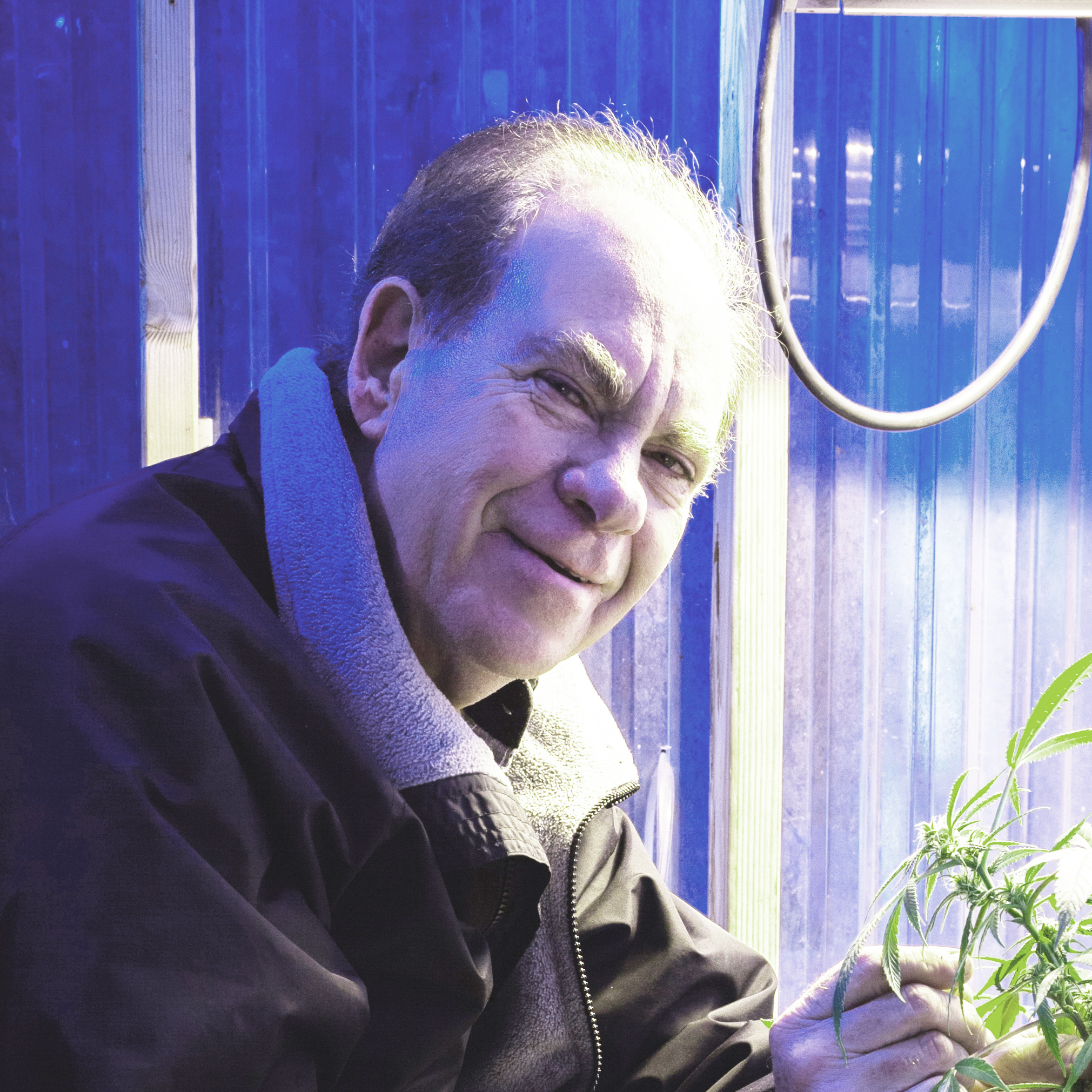
- Born: December 2, 1944 (age 81); Bronx, New York, U.S.
- Spouse: Jane Klein

Edward "Ed" Rosenthal (born December 2, 1944) is an American horticulturist, author, publisher, and Cannabis grower known for his advocacy for the legalization of marijuana use. He served as a columnist for High Times Magazine during the 1980s and 1990s. He was arrested in 2002 for cultivation of cannabis by federal authorities, who do not recognize the authority of states to regulate the use of medical marijuana. He was convicted in federal court, but the conviction was overturned on appeal. Rosenthal was subsequently convicted again, but was not re-sentenced, since his original sentence had been completed.

Rosenthal has been active in promoting and developing policies of civil regulation for medicinal marijuana. With the passage of California's pioneering Proposition 215 in 1996, which authorizes medicinal use of marijuana, he worked with the state and local governments to implement the delivery of pharmaceutical-grade cannabis to patients with a doctor's recommendation to use marijuana.

Rosenthal is also the author of numerous books about the cultivation of marijuana.

== Legal battles ==
In 2002, federal agents arrested Rosenthal, who previously had been deputized by the City of Oakland to grow marijuana for medical use. He was convicted, and some of the jurors denounced their own verdict after they learned Rosenthal was acting as an agent of the City of Oakland, a fact that had been withheld from them during the trial. In a surprise setback for the federal government, Rosenthal was sentenced by U.S. District Court Judge Charles Breyer to only one day in prison; time already served. In 2006, the 9th Circuit Appeals Court subsequently overturned Rosenthal's conviction. Months later, the U.S. Attorney's office re-indicted him. Although the judge had promised to sentence Rosenthal to no additional prison time, a new trial commenced on 14 May 2007.

On 31 May 2007, it was announced that Rosenthal had been convicted again on three of the five charges against him: one conspiracy count; one count of cultivation, intending to distribute and distributing marijuana; and one count of using a commercial building as a site for growing and distributing marijuana. He was acquitted of growing and distributing marijuana at the Harm Reduction Center medical-marijuana club in San Francisco. The jury deadlocked on whether he had conspired to grow and distribute marijuana at the Harm Reduction Center. Judge Breyer once again prohibited Rosenthal's lawyers from arguing before the jury that his work was sanctioned by Oakland government officials, a main point of contention for the jurors of the previous trial. Ed Rosenthal did not receive any additional jail time and planned to appeal.

== Advocacy ==
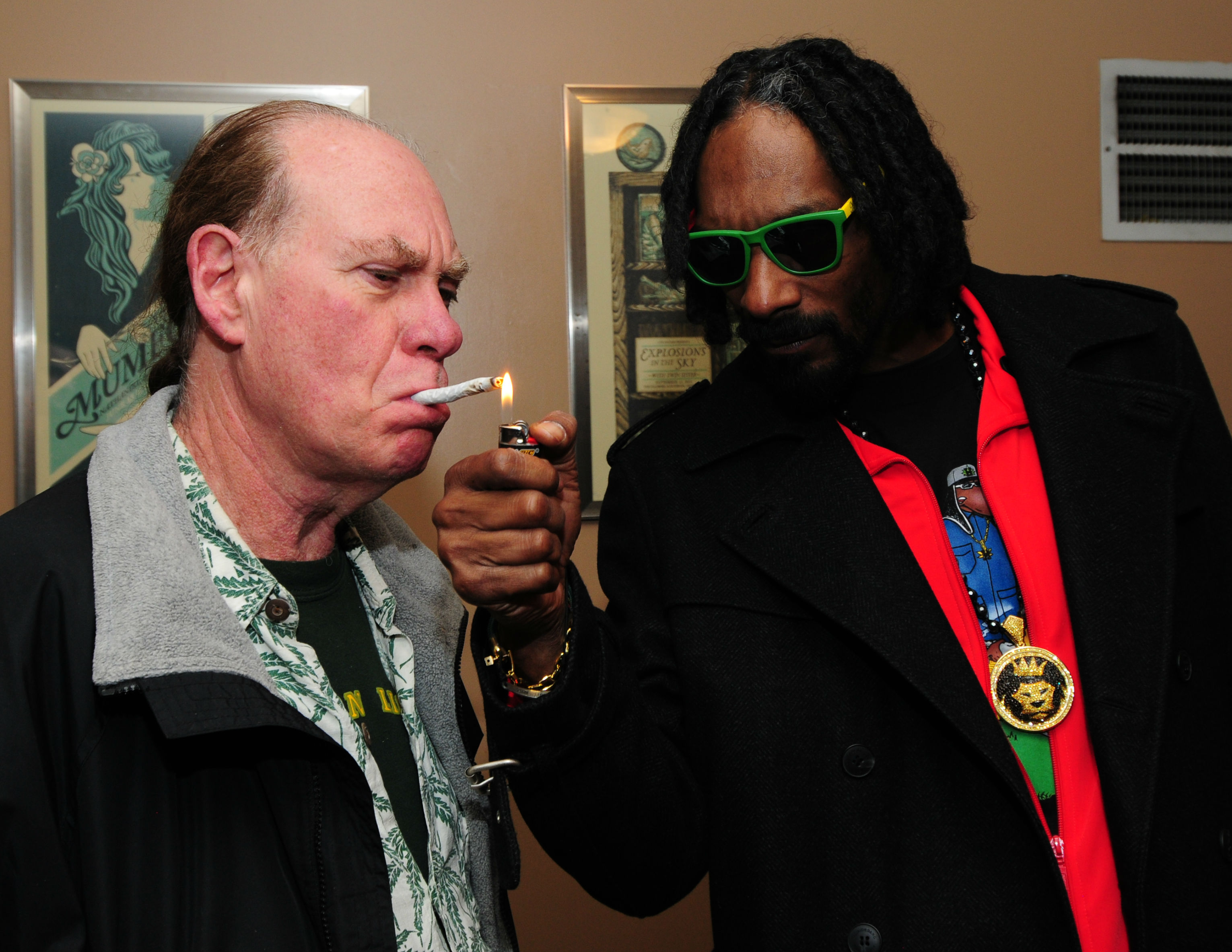
Snoop Dogg lights a joint for Ed Rosenthal

Rosenthal's public battles in the court have focused attention on the question of whether marijuana laws have become more harmful to society than the behavior they were intended to regulate. Recent polls show that as many as 80% of Americans support legal access to medical marijuana. The Federal Government does not recognize the legitimacy of medical marijuana initiatives passed by individual states, but beginning in 2013, under the Cole Memorandum, has not enforced federal laws against states that have legalized the recreational use such as California, Colorado, Oregon, Maine, Nevada, Massachusetts and Washington.

== Bibliography (partial) ==
- Rosenthal, Ed (1987). Marijuana question? Ask Ed. Quick American Publishing. OCLC 14905880.
- Rosenthal, Ed; Kubby, Steve (1996). Why marijuana should be legal (first ed.). Thunder's Mouth Press. OCLC 34598031.
- Rosenthal, Ed; Newhart, S. (2001). The big book of buds : marijuana varieties from the world's great seed breeders. Quick American. OCLC 49290687.
- Rosenthal, Ed; Zeman, Greg; Downs, David (2014). Beyond Buds: Marijuana Extracts - Hash, Vaping, Dabbing, Edibles & Medicines. Quick American Publishing. OCLC 890938840.
- Rosenthal, Ed; Downs, David (2017). Marijuana Harvest: Maximizing Quality and Yield in your Cannabis Garden. Quick American Publishing. OCLC 920018424.
- Rosenthal, Ed (2017). This Bud's for You. Quick American Publishing. OCLC 951453071.
- Rosenthal, Ed (2017). Legal Marijuana : Selecting, Growing & Enjoying Cannabis. OCLC 951453071.
- Rosenthal, Ed (2018). Beyond Buds, Next Generation: Marijuana Concentrates and Cannabis Infusions. Quick American. OCLC 1014427626.
- Rosenthal, Ed (2020). Ask Ed : marijuana success : grow cannabis year-round. Quick American Publishing. OCLC 1176281673.
- Rosenthal, Ed; Flannery, Robert; Bacca, Angela (2021). Cannabis Grower's Handbook. Quick American Publishing. OCLC 1251742447.

== See also ==
- Legal history of cannabis in the United States
- Cannabis in California
- Cannabis in the United States
