= Americans for Safe Access =

American cannabis advocacy group

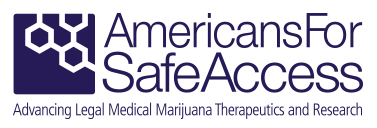
- Abbreviation: ASA
- Formation: 2002; 24 years ago
- Founded at: California
- Headquarters: Washington, D.C.
- Members: 250,000
- Leader: Steph Sherer
- Website: safeaccessnow.org

Americans for Safe Access (ASA), is a Washington, D.C., based advocacy organization working to ensure safe and legal access to medical cannabis.
