= Cannabis in California =

California's Cannabis Universal Symbol

Cannabis in California is illegal under United States federal law, yet legally sanctioned for medical use since 1996 and for recreational use since late 2016 under California law. The state of California has been at the forefront of efforts to liberalize cannabis laws in the United States, beginning in 1972 with the nation's first ballot initiative attempting to legalize cannabis (Proposition 19). Although it was unsuccessful, California would later become the first state to legalize medical cannabis through the Compassionate Use Act of 1996 (Proposition 215), which passed with 56% voter approval. In November 2016, California voters approved the Adult Use of Marijuana Act (Proposition 64) with 57% of the vote, which legalized the recreational use of cannabis.

As a result of recreational legalization, local governments (city and county) may not prohibit adults from growing, using, or transporting marijuana for personal use. Commercial activities can be regulated or prohibited by local governments although deliveries cannot be prohibited. Following recreational legalization, existing growers and suppliers of medical cannabis were required to register, comply with regulations, and apply for permits. Over half of the nonprofit dispensaries legally providing medical marijuana closed. Local agencies have been slow to approve retail stores selling cannabis for recreational purposes with most cities and counties banning retail with a wait and see approach. Many existing growers have been slow to apply for permits as it has been estimated that 60 percent or more of all cannabis consumed in the United States comes from northern California. The export of marijuana to other states remains illegal since the U.S. Drug Enforcement Administration considers it a Schedule I drug.

Reducing illegal activity is considered essential for the success of legal operations who pay the considerable taxes assessed by state and local authorities. Many people do not have nearby retail stores selling cannabis and continue to buy from unlicensed sellers. Illegal growing continues in remote rural areas. Raids and confiscation by law enforcement of illegal retail and grow operations have continued and in some cases stepped up after legalization.

California's main regulatory agencies were initially the Bureau of Cannabis Control (BCC), Department of Food and Agriculture, and Department of Public Health. Their responsibilities were merged under the Department of Cannabis Control in 2021.

== Current state and local regulation ==
Companies must obtain a license from a local agency in each jurisdiction to cultivate, test, or sell cannabis. Cities and counties, including unincorporated areas, may choose to permit all, some, or none of these activities. However, since January 2019, local governments may not prohibit deliveries by state-licensed companies. Distributors are required to act as intermediaries between cannabis producers and retailers.

In July 2021, California consolidated its state cannabis regulatory agencies into the Department of Cannabis Control. Before this change, the industry was overseen by three separate agencies. The Bureau of Cannabis Control regulated retailers, distributors, and testing laboratories. The Department of Food and Agriculture’s CalCannabis Cultivation Licensing Division oversaw cultivators. The Department of Public Health’s Manufactured Cannabis Safety Branch regulated cannabis product manufacturers.

Many communities have adopted zoning rules that prohibit cannabis retail stores. In response, some state legislators have introduced bills that would require certain local jurisdictions to permit a limited number of retail establishments, particularly in areas where a majority of voters supported legalizing recreational cannabis. Local governments have opposed these proposals. A May 2019 editorial in the Los Angeles Times also criticized this type of legislation. Supporters of the bills argue that limited access to legal retailers contributes to the continuation of illegal cannabis sales.

California prohibits the export of marijuana to other states, as the U.S. Drug Enforcement Administration considers it a Schedule I drug. Some estimates indicate that California produces up to five times more cannabis than is consumed within the state. Other estimates suggest that about 80% of the crop is shipped to other states. Cannabis that is exported from California is not subject to the state’s taxes or regulatory oversight. In addition, consumers in other states often pay higher prices for the product. The Federal Bureau of Investigation has investigated officials in several cities and counties.

Unlicensed sales were not reduced as fast as many expected. The growth of the legal market has been inhibited since the majority of cities and counties have not allowed the retail sale of cannabis. Due to the continued operation of much illegal activity, heavy taxation is an important issue for licensed operators. They are concerned about the perceived lack of sufficient enforcement against illegal activities. The legal market includes the cost of mandatory testing. Transitioning from a provisional, temporary license to a permanent license has also been difficult. As of April 2020, about 82% of the cannabis licenses were still provisional. Authorities warn that the illegal market may contain pesticide or other chemical residues and mold. Other products sold illegally that have not been tested include edible products and vaping pens.

=== Possession ===
Local governments may not prohibit adults from growing, using or transporting marijuana for personal use. An appeals court ruled that inmates who possess small amounts of marijuana in prison are not guilty of a felony crime. Attorney General Xavier Becerra's office had argued that possessing small amounts of marijuana is legally banned in prison which can result in significantly increasing a prisoner's sentence.

=== Cultivation ===
Cannabis is estimated to be the largest cash crop in California with a value of more than $11 billion. The state provided most of the cannabis consumed in the United States prior to legalization which was intended to provide a transition to legal, licensed growing. The California Environmental Quality Act (CEQA) requires a detailed analysis of the environmental impact of growers operations. Statewide, 208 growers had obtained regular, annual licenses by July 2019. At this point of some 18 months into legalization, 1,532 growers were still operating on provisional permits as they went through the CEQA process that requires extensive paperwork. Smaller farms were given five years to become established under legalization before larger growers were allowed to enter the market. Under the regulations set to expire in 2023, growers can have only one medium licence but there is no limit on the number of small licenses an individual grower can have. This loophole has allowed larger growers to operate.

Humboldt, Mendocino, and Trinity counties have long been known as Northern California's Emerald Triangle as it is estimated that 60 percent or more of all cannabis consumed in the United States is grown there. Registering and applying for permits has not been an easy decision for many long time growers in these three counties.

In Santa Barbara County, cannabis growing has taken over greenhouses that formerly grew flowers. In the first four months of legalization, the county had almost 800 permits issued for cultivators, the most of any county in the state.

Calaveras County registered more than seven hundred cultivators after county voters approved a tax in 2016.

==== Trespass grows ====
Unlicensed growing continues in remote rural areas and has expanded according to law enforcement reports. Raids and confiscation of illegal grow operations by law enforcement has continued and in some cases stepped up after legalization. Authorities are constantly dealing with illegal cultivation in remote protected areas such as state parks and national forests. Illegal grows are partially responsible for record levels of water thefts during the drought that began in 2020.

==== Pests and diseases ====
A large number of insect pests are significant, along with some mammals: Mice, Rattus rattus, Neotoma rat spp., Thomomys gopher spp., black-tailed deer (Odocoileus hemionus columbianus), and black bears (Ursus americanus). Powdery mildew Podosphaera macularis and various Pythium root rots (Pythium spp.) are important diseases in this crop. The Department of Pesticide Regulation provides legal guidance and treatment recommendations for all of these.

=== On-site consumption ===
In July 2019, West Hollywood approved a cannabis consumption license for Lowell Herb Co, "the first of its kind in the nation". Lowell Farms: A Cannabis Cafe opened in September 2019 with a menu of cannabis for consumption, THC-infused drinks and meals for cannabis-enhanced sense of taste and smell. It includes the expertise of cannabis sommeliers, known as "budtenders" on site. It has since been rebranded as the "Original Cannabis Cafe", separating itself from the Lowell Farms corporate brand. A retail establishment Seaweed On Ocean, was licensed in Lompoc for on site consumption in July 2018 and opened December 2019, claims to be the first between Los Angeles and San Francisco.

=== Retail and delivery ===
Stores selling cannabis for recreational purposes have been banned from 80% of the 482 municipalities in California. In September 2019, 873 cannabis sellers had been licensed by the state while the United Cannabis Business Assn. conducted an audit that estimated there are approximately 2,835 unlicensed dispensaries and delivery services based on advertising. Legal retailers say the illegal market is larger than the legal market due to the high costs they pay in start-up permit costs and on-going taxes. They complain about the lack of effective enforcement against unlicensed shops.

Prior to 2018, about 2,000 nonprofit dispensaries legally provided medical marijuana. Legalization introduced regulations that increased the cost of operation and more than 65% of dispensaries shut their doors. Recreational marijuana shops began to open in January 2018, with many districts beginning recreational sales on the first or fifth of January 2018. In January, 2018, Los Angeles had no licensed retailers; the closest cities with licensed retail sales were Santa Ana on January 1 and West Hollywood on January 2. As of September 2019, 187 dispensaries had temporary city approval in Los Angeles. Los Angeles adopted an ordinance in 2018 to restrict some storefront and billboard advertising after research showed that young adults who lived near dispensaries that had storefront signage used marijuana more frequently than their peers and have more positive views about the drug.

Many dispensaries and delivery companies continued to operate under the stay-at-home order during the COVID-19 pandemic. With an executive order on March 22, Governor Gavin Newsom declared cannabis one of the enterprises to be considered an essential business.

=== Special events ===
Organizers of cannabis festivals are required to get permission from state and local agencies. Under the permits, they can let anyone 21 and older buy and smoke weed at the festival. In 2019, Outside Lands Music and Arts Festival in San Francisco became the first major music festival to offer legal cannabis for sale on site. The area was known as "Grass Lands" and sold more than $1 million in cannabis products such as edibles, vaping cartridges and joints over the three-day event.

== History ==
=== Industrial hemp ===
Cannabis was cultivated for fiber and rope as early as 1795 in California, when cultivation began at Mission San Jose under the governorship of Diego de Borica. Cannabis was grown in several regions of Southern California, with two-thirds of it being grown on the missions. California produced 13,000 pounds of hemp in 1807, and 220,000 pounds in 1810. However, in 1810 Mexico began to rebel against the Spanish crown, and the subsidies for growing hemp were cut, leading to a near-disappearance of the crop. A few missions continued to grow it for local use, and the Russian colonists grew hemp at Fort Ross until the station was abandoned in 1841.

=== Psychoactive cannabis ===
Among the early cultivators of cannabis for recreational use in California were Arabs, Armenians, and Turks who grew cannabis as early as 1895 to make hashish for local consumption. Unlike in other states where fears of black or Hispanic use of cannabis drove new restrictions, California was an exception for its focus on South Asian immigrants. A California delegate to the Hague Convention wrote in 1911: "Within the last year we in California have been getting a large influx of Hindoos and they have in turn started quite a demand for cannabis indica; they are a very undesirable lot and the habit is growing in California very fast."

=== Criminalization ===
The Poison Act was passed in California in 1907, and in 1913 an amendment was made to make possession of "extracts, tinctures, or other narcotic preparations of hemp, or loco-weed, their preparations and compounds" a misdemeanor. There is no evidence that the law was ever used or intended to restrict pharmaceutical cannabis; instead it was a legislative mistake, and in 1915 another amendment forbade the sale or possession of "flowering tops and leaves, extracts, tinctures and other narcotic preparations of hemp or loco weed (Cannabis sativa), Indian hemp" except with a prescription. Both bills were drafted and supported by the California State Board of Pharmacy.

In 1914, one of the first cannabis drug raids in the nation occurred in the Mexican-American neighborhood of Sonoratown in Los Angeles, where police raided two "dream gardens" and confiscated a wagonload of cannabis. In 1925, possession, which had previously been treated the same as distribution, became punishable by up to 6 years in prison, and black market sale, which had initially been a misdemeanor punishable by a $100–$400 fine and/or 50–180 days in jail for first offenders, became punishable by 6 months–6 years. In 1927, the laws designed to target opium usage were finally extended to Indian hemp. In 1929, second offenses for possession became punishable by sentences of 6 months–10 years. In 1937, cannabis cultivation became a separate offense.

By 1932, 60% of narcotics arrests in Los Angeles involved cannabis, which was considered "much less serious than the morphine cases." In 1954, penalties for marijuana possession were hiked to a minimum 1–10 years in prison, and sale was made punishable by 5–15 years with a mandatory 3 years before eligibility for parole; two prior felonies raised the maximum sentences for both offenses to life imprisonment.

=== Popularization ===
In the 1950s and 1960s, the beatnik and later hippie cultures experimented with cannabis, driving increased interest in the drug. In 1964, the first cannabis legalization group was formed in the U.S. when Lowell Eggemeier of San Francisco was arrested, and his attorney established LEMAR (LEgalize MARijuana) shortly afterwards. By the mid-1960s, the Saturday Evening Post was publishing articles estimating that half the college population of California had tried cannabis. One writer commented that usage was: so widespread that pot must be considered an integral part of the generation's life experience.

=== Illicit cultivation ===
In the 1960s–1970s, people in California had developed the sinsemilla ("without seeds") method of producing cannabis, uprooting the male plants before they could pollinate the females, resulting in a seedless and more potent cannabis. Around 1975, this technique arrived in Humboldt County, which was to become one of the nation's most famous centers of cannabis production. California growers received an unintentional advantage from the US government, which in the 1970s began spraying cannabis fields in Mexico with the herbicide paraquat. Fears of contamination led to a drop in demand for cheaper Mexican cannabis, and a corresponding increase in demand for California-grown cannabis. By 1979, 35% of cannabis consumed in California was grown in-state. By 2010, 79% of cannabis nationwide came from California.

=== Decriminalization ===
==== Moscone Act (1975) ====
Decriminalization of cannabis – which treats possession of small amounts as a civil (rather than a criminal) offense – was established in July 1975 when the state legislature passed Senate Bill 95, the Moscone Act. SB 95 made possession of one ounce (28 g) of marijuana a misdemeanor punishable by a $100 fine, with higher punishments for amounts greater than one ounce, for possession on school grounds, or for cultivation.

==== "Smoke a joint, lose your license" expires (1999) ====
In 1999, a state law was allowed to expire that mandated a six-month driver's license suspension for possession of cannabis or other illegal drugs. The policy originated with a 1990 federal law that threatened to reduce transportation funding for states unless they took one of two actions: impose a six-month driver’s license suspension for individuals convicted of a drug offense, or pass a resolution formally declining to adopt such a penalty. The law was enacted in 1994 at the urging of Governor Pete Wilson, who argued that the policy kept unsafe drivers off the road and helped prevent illegal drug use. Critics argued that the punishment was excessive and often had nothing to do with the offense committed. The law resulted in as many as 100,000 license suspensions per year according to the California Department of Motor Vehicles.

==== Proposition 36 (2000) ====
Proposition 36 (also known as the Substance Abuse and Crime Prevention Act of 2000) was approved by 61% of voters, requiring that "first and second offense drug violators be sent to drug treatment programs instead of facing trial and possible incarceration."

==== Senate Bill 1449 (2010) ====
On September 30, 2010, Governor Arnold Schwarzenegger signed into law SB 1449, which further reduced the charge of possession of one ounce (28 g) of cannabis or less, from a misdemeanor to an infraction, similar to a traffic violation—a maximum of a $100 fine and no mandatory court appearance or criminal record. The law became effective January 1, 2011.

=== Medical cannabis legalization ===
==== Early reform efforts (pre-1996) ====
The movement to legalize medical cannabis in the U.S. sprang out of San Francisco in the early 1990s, with efforts soon spreading statewide and eventually across the nation. Proposition P was approved by 79% of San Francisco voters in November 1991, calling on state lawmakers to pass legislation allowing the medical use of cannabis. The city board of supervisors additionally passed a resolution in August 1992 urging the police commission and district attorney to "make lowest priority the arrest or prosecution of those involved in the possession or cultivation of [cannabis] for medicinal purposes" and to "allow a letter from a treating physician to be used as prima facia evidence that marijuana can alleviate the pain and suffering of that patient's medical condition". The resolution enabled the open sale of cannabis to AIDS patients and others within the city, most notably through the San Francisco Cannabis Buyers Club which was operated by medical cannabis activist Dennis Peron (who spearheaded Proposition P and later the statewide Proposition 215). Similar clubs appeared outside San Francisco in the ensuing years as other cities passed legislation to support the medical use of cannabis. The Wo/Men's Alliance for Medical Marijuana was founded in 1993 after 75% of Santa Cruz voters approved Measure A in November 1992. And the Oakland Cannabis Buyers' Cooperative was founded in 1995 shortly before the city council passed multiple medical cannabis resolutions.

Following the lead of San Francisco and other cities in California, state lawmakers passed Senate Joint Resolution 8 in 1993, a non-binding measure calling on the federal government to enact legislation allowing physicians to prescribe cannabis. In 1994, Senate Bill 1364 was approved by state legislators, to reclassify cannabis as a Schedule II drug at the state level. And Assembly Bill 1529 was approved in 1995, to create a medical necessity defense for patients using cannabis with a physician's recommendation, for treatment of AIDS, cancer, glaucoma, or multiple sclerosis. Both SB 1364 and AB 1529 were vetoed by Governor Pete Wilson, however, paving the way for the passage of Proposition 215 in 1996.

==== Proposition 215 (1996) ====
Frustrated by vetoes of medical cannabis bills in successive years, medical cannabis advocates in California took the issue directly to the voters, collecting 775,000 signatures for qualification of a statewide ballot initiative in 1996. Proposition 215 – the Compassionate Use Act of 1996 – was subsequently approved with 56% of the vote, legalizing the use, possession, and cultivation of cannabis by patients with a physician's recommendation, for treatment of cancer, anorexia, AIDS, chronic pain, spasticity, glaucoma, arthritis, migraine, or "any other illness for which marijuana provides relief". The law also allowed patient caregivers to cultivate cannabis, and urged lawmakers to facilitate the "safe and affordable distribution of marijuana".

==== Senate Bill 420 (2003) ====
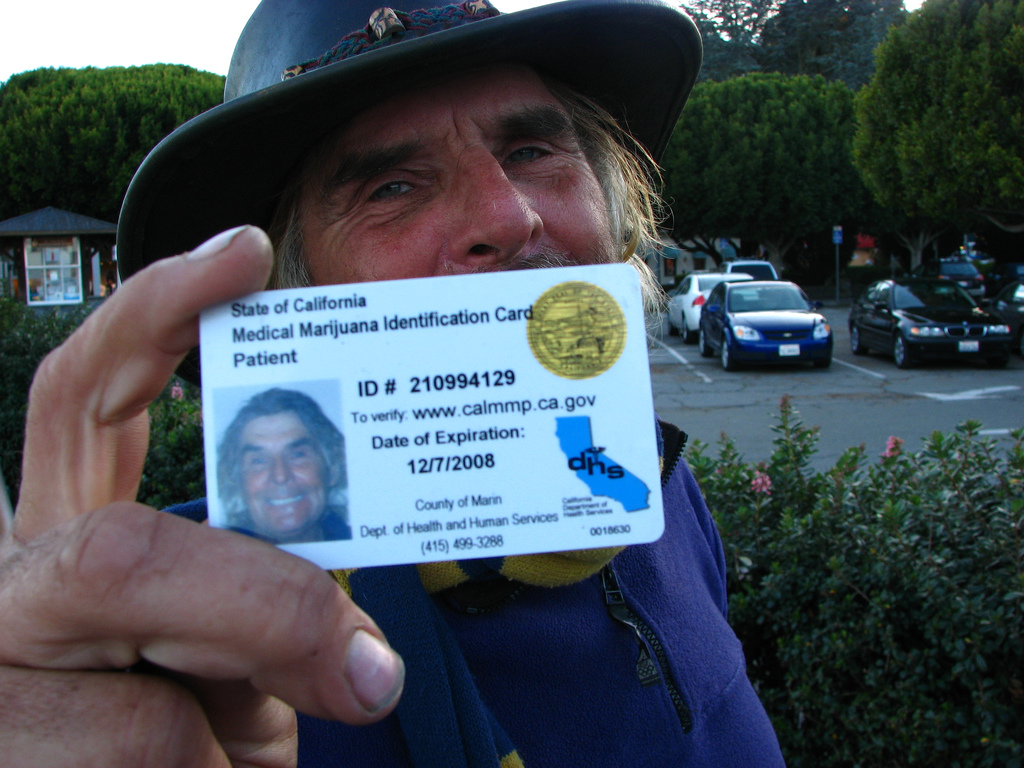
Medical cannabis card in Marin County

Vague wording became a major criticism of Proposition 215, though the law has since been clarified through state Supreme Court rulings and the passage of subsequent laws. The first such legislative solution came in January 2003 with the passage of Senate Bill 420 (colloquially known as the Medical Marijuana Program Act). Senate Bill 420 established an identification card system for medical cannabis patients, and allowed the formation of non-profit collectives for provision of cannabis to patients.

In 2006 San Diego County filed a lawsuit over its required participation in the state ID card program, but the challenge was later struck down and the city was forced to comply. In January 2010 the California Supreme Court ruled in People v. Kelly that SB 420 did not limit the quantity of cannabis that a patient can possess. All possession limits were therefore lifted.

==== Implementation and criticism ====
California was the first state to establish a medical cannabis program, enacted by Proposition 215 in 1996 and Senate Bill 420 in 2003. Proposition 215, also known as the Compassionate Use Act, allows people the right to obtain and use cannabis for any illness if they obtain a recommendation from a doctor. The Supreme Court of California has ruled there are no specified limits as to what a patient may possess in their private residence if the cannabis is strictly for the patient's own use. Medical cannabis identification cards are issued through the California Department of Public Health's Medical Marijuana Program (MMP). The program began in three counties in May 2005, and expanded statewide in August of the same year. 37,236 cards have been issued throughout 55 counties as of December 2009. However, cannabis dispensaries within the state accept recommendations, with an embossed license, from a doctor who has given the patient an examination and believes cannabis would be beneficial for their ailment.

Cannabis evaluations in Venice Beach

Critics of California's medical cannabis program argued that the program essentially gave cannabis quasi-legality, as "anyone can obtain a recommendation for medical marijuana at any time for practically any ailment". Acknowledging that there were instances in which the system was abused and that laws could be improved, Stephen Gutwillig of the Drug Policy Alliance insisted that what Proposition 215 had accomplished was "nothing short of incredible". Gutwillig argued that because of the law, 200,000 patients in the state had safe and affordable access to medical cannabis to relieve pain and treat medical conditions, without having to risk arrest or buy off the black market.

==== Conflict with federal law ====
Although Proposition 215 legalized medical cannabis in California, at the federal level it remained a Schedule I prohibited drug. Seeking to enforce this prohibition, the Justice Department conducted numerous raids and prosecutions of medical cannabis providers throughout the state in subsequent years. Who grows marijuana and where it comes from were lightly regulated. Federal authorities claimed that these medical marijuana businesses were fronts for the black market. Also rather than growing medical marijuana in small batches for patients, they claimed the cannabis was coming from Mexico or large hidden grows in California. Some state and local officials strongly supported these enforcement efforts, in particular Attorney General Dan Lungren who was a vocal opponent of Proposition 215 leading up to its passage. Other officials, such as San Francisco District Attorney Terence Hallinan, condemned the actions as a gross intrusion into the state's affairs. The raids and prosecutions increased in frequency throughout the Bush and Obama years, until finally in December 2014 the Rohrabacher–Farr amendment was enacted at the federal level.

One of the raids that occurred was at the Wo/Men's Alliance for Medical Marijuana in Santa Cruz in September 2002. WAMM was a non-profit collective set up to provide cannabis to seriously ill patients, and was working closely with local authorities to follow all applicable state and local laws. On the morning of September 5, 2002, DEA agents equipped with paramilitary gear and semiautomatic weapons stormed the premises, destroyed all the cannabis plants, and arrested the property owners Mike and Valerie Corral. This prompted an angry response from nearby medical cannabis patients – some in wheelchairs – who gathered at the site to block federal agents from leaving, until finally after three hours later the Corrals were released. The raid triggered a strong backlash from Santa Cruz city officials as well, who sanctioned an event two weeks later where cannabis was handed out to patients on the steps of city hall, attracting widespread media attention. The DEA was "appalled" by the event, but took no further action.

Further pushback against federal enforcement efforts occurred in June 2003 following the jury trial conviction of Ed Rosenthal, a high school biology teacher and High Times author, who had been raided by the DEA in 2002 for growing more than 100 cannabis plants in an Oakland warehouse. Because cannabis remained a prohibited substance under federal law, jurors could not be informed that Rosenthal had been deputized by the city of Oakland to grow the cannabis, or even that the cannabis was being used for medical purposes only. Rosenthal was easily convicted as a result; however, immediately following the trial, when jurors found out the true circumstances of the case, they publicly renounced the verdict they had just handed down and demanded a retrial. Judge Charles Breyer, in part influenced by the extraordinary action of the jurors, sentenced Rosenthal to just one day in jail, of which he had already served.

In July 2007, a new tactic was adopted by the DEA of threatening landlords renting to medical cannabis providers. Letters were sent to a number of property owners in the Los Angeles area, informing them that they faced up to 20 years in prison for violating the "crack house statute" of the Controlled Substances Act, in addition to seizure of their properties. This tactic subsequently spread to other areas of California, while DEA raids continued to increase as well in the following years. In October 2011 an extensive and coordinated crackdown on California's cannabis dispensaries was announced by the chief prosecutors of the state's four federal districts.

Three major court cases originated in California that attempted to challenge the federal government's ability to enforce federal law in states that have legalized medical cannabis. Conant v. McCaffrey was brought forth in response to various threats made by the federal government against doctors who recommend cannabis to patients. Decided in 2000, it upheld the right of physicians to recommend but not prescribe cannabis. In United States v. Oakland Cannabis Buyers' Cooperative (decided in 2001), it was argued that medical use of cannabis should be permitted as constituted by a "medical necessity" – but this argument was unsuccessful. In Gonzales v. Raich (decided in 2005), the constitutionality of the Controlled Substances Act was challenged based on the idea that cannabis grown and consumed in California does not qualify as interstate commerce – but this argument was also found to be without merit.

=== Recreational cannabis legalization ===
==== Proposition 19 (1972) ====
In 1972, California became the first state to vote on a ballot measure seeking to legalize cannabis. Proposition 19 – the California Marijuana Initiative – sought to legalize the use, possession, and cultivation of cannabis, but did not allow for commercial sales. The initiative was spearheaded by the group Amorphia, which was founded in 1969 (by Blair Newman) and financed its activities through the sale of hemp rolling papers. It was ultimately defeated by a wide margin (33–67%), but supporters were encouraged by the results, which provided momentum to other reform efforts in California in subsequent years. In 1974, Amorphia ran into financial difficulties and became the California chapter of NORML.

==== Marijuana Control, Regulation, and Education Act (2009) ====
In February 2009, Tom Ammiano introduced the Marijuana Control, Regulation, and Education Act, which would remove penalties under state law for the cultivation, possession, and use of marijuana for persons the age of 21 or older. When the Assembly Public Safety Committee approved the bill on a 4 to 3 vote in January 2010, this marked the first time in United States history that a bill legalizing marijuana passed a legislative committee. While the legislation failed to reach the Assembly floor, Ammiano stated his plans to reintroduce the bill later in the year, depending on the success of Proposition 19, the Regulate, Control and Tax Cannabis Act. According to Time, California tax collectors estimated the bill would have raised about $1.3 billion a year in revenue.

Critics such as John Lovell, lobbyist for the California Peace Officers' Association, argued that too many people already struggle with alcohol and drug abuse, and legalizing another mind-altering substance would lead to a surge of use, making problems worse. Apart from helping the state's budget by enforcing a tax on the sale of cannabis, proponents of the bill argued that legalization would reduce the amount of criminal activity associated with the drug.

==== Proposition 19 (2010) ====
In November 2010, California voters rejected Proposition 19 (by a vote of 53.5% to 46.5%), an initiative that would have legalized the use, possession, and cultivation of cannabis for adults age 21 and over, and regulated its sale similar to alcohol. The initiative faced stiff opposition from numerous police organizations in the state, while many growers in the Emerald Triangle were strongly opposed due to fears that corporate megafarms would put them out of business. The initiative was also undercut by the passage of Senate Bill 1449 a month before the election. Proposition 19 was spearheaded by Richard Lee, founder of Oaksterdam University.

==== Proposition 64 (2016) ====
Proposition 64 (2016) results by county. Counties with a majority of "yes" votes are in blue and counties with a majority of "no" votes are in yellow.

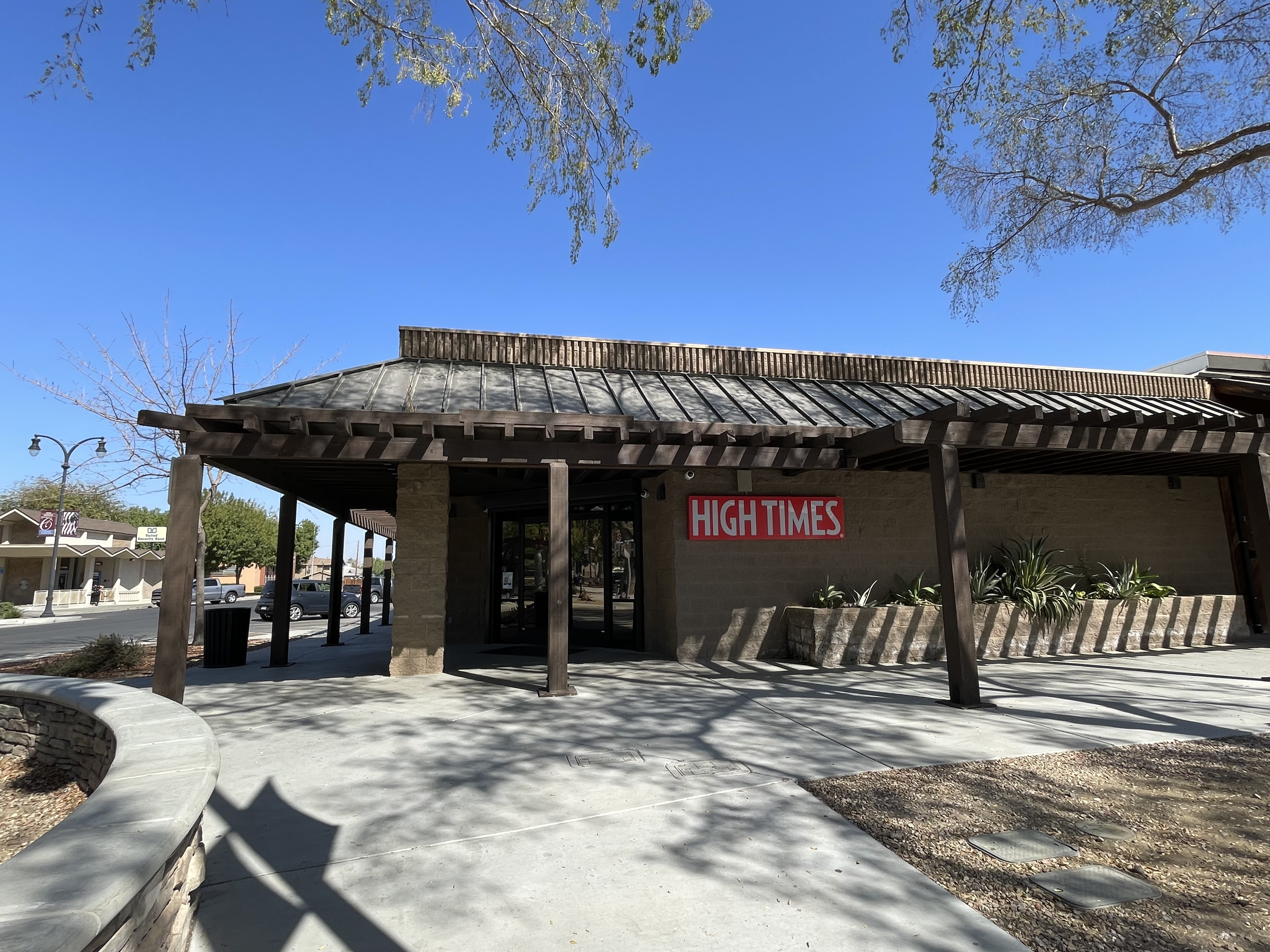
High Times cannabis dispensary in Coalinga, California, pictured in October 2022 (Sarah Stierch (CC BY 4.0))

On November 8, 2016, Proposition 64 – the Adult Use of Marijuana Act – passed by a 57% to 43% vote, legalizing the use, sale, and cultivation of recreational cannabis in California for adults 21 and over. The initiative was certified for the ballot on June 28, 2016, after supporters handed in more than 600,000 raw signatures of the 365,000 certified signatures that were required. The initiative received the largest amount of support from Napster founder Sean Parker who contributed more than $8.6 million of the $25 million that was raised in support of the initiative. Lieutenant Governor Gavin Newsom was the highest-ranking official in the state to endorse the initiative; it was also endorsed by several of the state's major newspapers including the Los Angeles Times, San Francisco Chronicle, San Diego Union-Tribune, Orange County Register, and San Jose Mercury News.

Immediately upon certification of the November 2016 ballot results, adults age 21 or older were allowed to:

- Possess, transport, process, purchase, obtain, or give away, without any compensation whatsoever, no more than one ounce of dry cannabis or eight grams concentrated cannabis to adults the age of 21 or older.
- Possess, plant, cultivate, harvest, dry, or process no more than six live plants and the produce of those plants in a private residence, in a locked area not seen from normal view, in compliance with all local ordinances.
- Smoke or ingest cannabis.
- Possess, transport, purchase, obtain, use, manufacture, or give away marijuana paraphernalia to peoples the age of 21 or older.

Users may not:

- Smoke it where tobacco is prohibited.
- Possess, ingest or smoke within 1,000 feet (300 m) of a day care, school, or youth center while children are present (except within a private residence and if said smoke is not detectable to said children).
- Manufacture concentrated cannabis using a volatile solvent without a license under Chapter 3.5 of Division 8 or Division 10 of the Business and Professions Code.
- Possess an open container or marijuana paraphernalia while in the driver or passenger seat of a vehicle used for transportation.
- Smoke or ingest marijuana while operating a vehicle used for transportation.
- Smoke or ingest marijuana while riding in the passenger seat or compartment of a vehicle.

Licenses were issued to allow cultivation and business establishment beginning in 2018. Legal sales for non-medical use were allowed by law beginning January 1, 2018, following formulation of new regulations on retail market by the state's Bureau of Medical Cannabis Regulation (to be renamed Bureau of Marijuana Control).

Proposition 64 is not meant in any way to affect, amend, or restrict the statutes provided for medical cannabis in California under Proposition 215.

In 2016, in response to Proposition 64, State Treasurer John Chiang set up a working group to explore access to financial services for legal marijuana-related businesses operating in California, as access to banking services has been a problem due to the additional burdens mandated by the Financial Crimes Enforcement Network (FinCEN) on financial institutions to assure that any marijuana related business clients are in compliance with all state laws.

=== Post-legalization ===
==== Cannabis Appellations Program (2021) ====
After the adoption of Proposition 64, California has been pioneering the CalCannabis Appellations Project (CAP), to develop appellations of origin for cannabis products. The California Department of Food and Agriculture claims that the CAP will "promote regional cannabis goods and local businesses, prevent the misrepresentation of a cannabis good’s origin, and support consumer confidence about a cannabis good’s origin and characteristics." A series of consultations are underway to develop the CAP.

The benefits of this program:

1. Promoting the unique characteristics and qualities of cannabis grown in different regions, similar to how wine regions are known for specific varietals and styles.
2. Encouraging sustainable and responsible farming practices by requiring growers in designated regions to meet certain environmental and labor standards.
3. Supporting small farmers and preserving local agriculture by promoting and protecting the unique heritage of cannabis grown in specific regions.
4. Provide consumers with more information about the origin and quality of cannabis products, similar to how wine bottles are labeled with their region of origin.
5. Help to establish California as a leader in the cannabis industry by setting standards for high-quality cannabis production.
6. Create economic opportunities for rural communities and help them to diversify their income sources
7. Promote transparency, traceability, and accountability in the cannabis supply chain by providing a means to certify the origin and quality of cannabis products.

==== September 2022 reforms ====
In September 2022, Governor Gavin Newsom signed into law a number of cannabis-related reforms, including bills to protect cannabis users from healthcare discrimination, require child welfare social workers to treat parental cannabis use the same as alcohol, prevent employees from being fired for cannabis use outside of work hours (with exceptions for federal employees or workers in safety-sensitive positions), allow veterinarians to recommend medical cannabis for pets, facilitate the sealing of records for certain cannabis offenses, and allow interstate commerce for cannabis to and from California (provided that the federal government has first indicated that it will allow such activity).

==== Pesticide contamination ====
In June 2024, the Los Angeles Times tested legally-sold cannabis products in California and uncovered large amounts of pesticides in many cannabis products. Twenty-five of 42 products contained pesticides exceeding the levels permitted by law. The investigation alleges that many testing laboratories fraudulently certified products as satisfying pesticide regulations, when in fact they did not meet the regulations. Owners of some private testing laboratories stated that they were forced out of business because they refused to falsify test results. The Department of Cannabis Control, which is responsible for regulating cannabis in California, refused to release the results of its own internal testing of cannabis products. In September 2024, a lawsuit was filed by a former employee of the Department of Cannabis Control, alleging that the head of the department had ignored fraudulent testing, and that the department fired the former employee when the employee attempted to publicize the fraud. The same lawsuit also alleges that the potency displayed on the labels of many legal cannabis products in California are deliberately inflated by fraudulent testing laboratories.

==== Policy in 2025 ====
California's New Cannabis Policy, effective January 1, 2025, introduces several significant changes to the state's cannabis regulations, aiming to enhance consumer experiences, streamline business operations, and address public health concerns within the framework of California's existing legal cannabis market.

== See also ==
- Drug policy of California
- Law of California
- Legal history of cannabis in the United States
