= Medical Marijuana Program Act =

Proposed legislation regarding medical marijuana

California Senate Bill 420 (colloquially known as the Medical Marijuana Program Act) was a bill introduced by John Vasconcellos of the California State Senate, and subsequently passed by the California State Legislature and signed by Governor Gray Davis in 2003 "pursuant to the powers reserved to the State of California and its people under the Tenth Amendment to the United States Constitution." It clarified the scope and application of California Proposition 215, also known as the Compassionate Use Act of 1996, and established the California medical marijuana program. The bill's title is notable because "420" is a common phrase used in cannabis culture.

== Summary ==
The bill specifically:

- "demonstrates that more information is needed to assess the number of individuals across the state who are suffering from serious medical conditions that are not being adequately alleviated through the use of conventional medications"
- "require[s] the State Department of Health Services to establish and maintain a voluntary program for the issuance of identification cards to qualified patients and would establish procedures under which a qualified patient with an identification card may use marijuana for medical purposes"
- "creates various crimes related to the identification card program"
- "authorize[s] the Attorney General to set forth and clarify details concerning possession and cultivation limits, and other regulations, as specified"
- "authorize[s] the Attorney General to recommend modifications to the possession or cultivation limits set forth in the bill" and "require[s] the Attorney General to develop and adopt guidelines to ensure the security and nondiversion of marijuana grown for medical use"

In enacting the bill it was the intent of the legislature to:

- "clarify the scope of the application of the act and facilitate the prompt identification of qualified patients and their designated primary caregivers in order to avoid unnecessary arrest and prosecution of these individuals and provide needed guidance to law enforcement officers"
- "promote uniform and consistent application of the act among the counties within the state"
- "enhance the access of patients and caregivers to medical marijuana through collective, cooperative cultivation projects"
- "address additional issues that were not included within the act, and that must be resolved in order to promote the fair and orderly implementation of the act"

== Possession limits ==
In recognition of the fact that the guidelines are inadequate for many very ill patients, SB 420 allows patients to be exempted from them if they obtain a physician's statement that they need more. In deference to local autonomy, SB 420 also allows counties and cities to establish higher - but not lower - guidelines if they so choose. As a result, the new law will not overturn liberal guidelines that are now in effect in Sonoma and elsewhere. However, it should force more restrictive counties, such as San Bernardino and Fresno, which have heretofore had "zero tolerance" policies, to honor the new statewide minimum standard. Many counties have increased the limits of possession and cultivation since the passage of the law in 2003. It also specifically allowed cannabis cooperatives.

== Voluntary state ID card system ==
The Medical Marijuana Identification Card Program (also referred to as MMIP, or MMIC) is administered by county health departments. There are registration fees to cover the costs of the program, with a 50% discount for Medi-Cal patients. Identification cards generally have an expiration date of one year after the date of application, regardless if the physician's recommendation expires before that date. The California Department of Public Health maintains a 24-hour telephone hotline and an online website by which law enforcement and collectives/cooperatives can verify the validity of the card(s).

The system is designed with safeguards to protect patient privacy like the former San Francisco and Oakland ID card system. Police may identify whether persons are medical marijuana patients by only a unique identification number appearing on the card. Although some patient advocates have expressed qualms about the privacy of the new identification system, California NORML recommends that patients register to protect themselves from arrest. Persons designated as "primary caregivers" are also eligible for ID cards. Each patient may designate only one caregiver under the voluntary program.

Abuse was found in Mendocino County California, when then Sheriff Craver required patients to pick up their cards at his sheriffs station. This was where convicted rapists and drug offenders had to get their criminal registration cards. Here, then, the marijuana patients were subjected to abuse by the local law enforcement, as the state Department of Health was not involved with card distribution at that time. Patients, who had been assured that no centralized database would ever be created with their personal information, were themselves witness to that part of SB 420's irregularity.

In a quirky provision, SB 420 forbids caregivers from having more than one patient unless all of them reside in the same "city or county" as the caregiver. This means that no one may be a caregiver for both a spouse and a parent if they happen to reside in different counties. California NORML attorneys believe that this is an unconstitutional restriction on Prop 215 and intends to challenge it in court.

In 2006, San Diego County was sued for refusing to implement an ID card system as required under SB 420. In response, San Diego County filed a lawsuit against the State of California to overturn Prop. 215 and SB 420. San Diego Superior Court Judge, William R. Nevitt Jr. struck down San Diego's claim in the court's December 6, 2006 ruling. San Diego County filed an appeal in the case. The appeal was on August 1, 2008, and was thrown out again on the basis that the counties did not have the authority to make a case against the state. The counties do, however, have the right to make an appeal about the statutes in SB 420 that deal with the issuing of identification cards, as this task is placed upon the counties and affects their taxes. San Diego County along with San Bernardino County appealed to the United States Supreme Court. On May 18, 2009 that appeal was denied.

Currently, there are only two counties that submit information anonymously to the state, Santa Cruz and San Francisco. All the other counties submit patient information to the state patient database.

== Other provisions of SB 420 ==
In other provisions, SB 420:

- Recognizes the right of patients and caregivers to associate collectively or cooperatively to cultivate medical marijuana.
- Disallows marijuana smoking in no smoking zones, within 1,000 feet (300 m) of a school or youth center (except in private residences), on school buses, in a motor vehicle that is being operated, or while operating a boat.
- Protects patients and caregivers from arrest for transportation and other miscellaneous charges not covered in 215.
- Allows probationers, parolees, and prisoners to apply for permission to use medical marijuana; however, such permission may be refused at the discretion of the authorities.
- Makes it a crime to fraudulently provide misinformation to obtain a card, to steal or misuse the card of another, to counterfeit a card, or to breach the confidentiality of patient records in the card program.

== People v. Kelly ==
Concerning limits on possession created by the bill, the California Supreme Court decision in People v. Kelly decided multiple issues. First, it reiterated that "unlike [Proposition 215], which did not immunize medical marijuana users from arrest but instead provided a limited 'immunity' defense to prosecution under state law for cultivation or possession of marijuana ... the [Medical Marijuana Program]'s identification card system is designed to protect against unnecessary arrest." Secondly, it agreed with both Kelly and the California Attorney General that the limits were an "unconstitutionally amendatory insofar as it limits an in-court CUA defense".

However, the section concerning limits on possession "should remain an enforceable part of the MMP, applicable to the extent possible — including to those persons who voluntarily participate in the program by registering and obtaining identification cards that provide protection against arrest" because it provided more rights, namely the immunity against arrest. A qualified patient or primary caregiver that participates in the voluntary MMIC program also maintains his or her separate rights under California Health and Safety Code Section 11362.5, which are not included in the legislature-driven amendments seven years later.

== City of Garden Grove v. Superior Court ==
On December 1, 2008, the Supreme Court decided not to hear arguments in City of Garden Grove v. Superior Court of Orange County, leaving a lower court ruling standing which requires local police officers to enforce state law, not federal law. The case stems from a traffic stop of Felix Kha, who had 8.1 grams of medical marijuana in a container, which the police officers confiscated. The ruling requires police officers to return the seized medicine.

But it must be remembered it is not the job of the local police to enforce the federal drug laws as such.

== People v. Jovan Jackson ==
Concerning the scope of the legal defense created by the bill, the California Fourth Appellate District clarified the law in regards to the Medical Marijuana Program Act (MMPA), and was upheld by the California Supreme Court. In the People v. Jovan Jackson, (2012) 210 Cal.App.4th 1371, the court held that the MMPA does not require active participation by all members of a collective in the cultivation process and membership may be limited to financial support by way of marijuana purchases. The court stated the three elements of the MMPA are that the collective 1. Are qualified patients or primary caregivers; and, 2. Collectively associate to cultivate marijuana; and, 3. The collective must be a nonprofit enterprise. In addition, the court provided factors for a jury to consider as to whether a medical marijuana collective is a non-profit, specifically:

The size of the collective's membership; the volume of purchases from the collective; the members participation in the operation and governance of the collective; the testimony of the operator[s] of the collective; its formal establishment as a nonprofit organization; the presence or absence of any financial records; the presence or absence of processes by which the collective is accountable to its members; the volume of business it conducts; any other evidence of profit or loss.

== See also ==
- Cannabis in California
- Drug policy of California
- Legal history of marijuana in the United States
- Medical cannabis
- Proposition 215
- Valerie Corral
- 420 (cannabis culture)
