= Valerie Corral =

American cannabis activist

Valerie Leveroni Corral (born 1953) is an American medical cannabis activist and writer. As a young adult she experienced a traumatic head injury that left her with a seizure disorder that antiepileptic medication could not ameliorate. Her experimental use of cannabis to treat her seizures led her to grow it on her property in Santa Cruz, California. In 1992, she was arrested for cannabis cultivation, becoming the first person in that state to argue the medical necessity defense. Following her success, she founded the Wo/Men's Alliance for Medical Marijuana (WAMM) and was a coauthor of Proposition 215, the first medical cannabis state ballot initiative to pass in the United States.

== Early life ==
Valerie Leveroni was born in 1953. Her great-grandparents immigrated to America from Italy. When she was 20, Valerie was involved in a traumatic car accident that would later indirectly lead to her career as a cannabis activist. On March 24, 1973, while she was a premed student at the University of Nevada, Valerie was a passenger in a Volkswagen Beetle being driven by her friend through Reno, Nevada, when a low-flying P-51 Mustang caused the vehicle to crash. Valerie and the driver were ejected from the vehicle and sustained massive injuries.

Valerie was left with "uncontrollable grand mal seizures, triggering confusion, loss of muscle control, convulsions, and fainting." She began taking a regimen of antiepilepsy and pain medicine that left her in a drug-induced stupor, but the spasms and seizures continued. For two years, Valerie was left in what she describes as a "pharmaceutical delirium", where she developed an addiction to phenobarbital and diazepam which she was prescribed to mitigate her seizures.

Valerie met Michael Corral in June 1973. They became married in 1978 and Mike became her caregiver. He soon discovered an article in a medical journal (Note: Munson et al. (September 1975). "Antineoplastic Activity of Cannabinoids". Journal of the National Cancer Institute. 55 (3): 597–602; Sociologist Wendy Chapkis notes that experimental research on using cannabis to control epileptic seizures was known since 1949. It was notably mentioned in the report "Marihuana, A Signal of Misunderstanding" published by Nixon's National Commission on Marihuana and Drug Abuse in 1972. The report highlighted research by Davis & Ramsey who showed the results of "anticonvulsant activity" after giving THC to five epileptic children.) highlighting the experimental use of cannabis to control seizures in rats. Having tried everything else at that point, Valerie took the $40,000 from the insurance settlement and purchased property in the Santa Cruz mountains. Here, the Corrals started a small cannabis garden to help treat Valerie's symptoms from her head trauma as well as provide cannabis for their sick friends.

== 1992 raid ==
By 1992, Valerie and her husband Mike were growing their own food on their property in Santa Cruz as well as cultivating five cannabis plants to help control Valerie's seizures. Local law enforcement had questioned the Corrals about growing cannabis on their property, but had always accepted her reason for medical necessity. In August of that same year, helicopters working on behalf of the Campaign Against Marijuana Planting (CAMP), a multi-agency law enforcement task force managed by the California Department of Justice, identified the Corrals plants during their surveying mission.

Soon after, the Corrals were arrested by the police. Michael recalls that "before our arrest, we had never really thought about marijuana as being political. We were pretty much totally unaware that there was any kind of medical marijuana movement around at all. We lived back in the woods and just minded our own business, doing our own thing. The arrest changed all that; the people involved in the Measure A campaign found out about us and Valerie became the poster child for the initiative." Measure A, the Santa Cruz medical cannabis ballot initiative, was a "nonbinding referendum recommending that police and prosecutors use discretion in cases where seriously ill patients were using marijuana for medical reasons". It was approved by 77% of voters in November 1992. Measure A was the second medical cannabis initiative in California following Proposition P in San Francisco, which passed in 1991.

The district attorney brought felony charges against the Corrals while asking for a prison sentence of three years. Valerie then proceeded to mount the first medical necessity defense in California. Her personal physician told the court that if cannabis was legal, he would prescribe it to Valerie. In March 1993, the district attorney dismissed the charges against the Corrals, believing that no potential jury would agree to convict the defendants. He also reiterated that he would continue to prosecute cannabis cases.

== 1993 raid ==
A year later, the Corrals were raided again, in September 1993, just six months after the charges were dropped from the previous raid. The sheriffs performed an extended search of the Corral's home, charging them with distribution and cultivation.

== Wo/Men's Alliance for Medical Marijuana (WAMM) ==
In 1993, Valerie founded the Wo/Men's Alliance for Medical Marijuana (WAMM), a cooperative organization that offers medical cannabis to qualifying patients for free. The group maintained and grew their own cannabis, which they closely monitored for quality, and provided educational resources to the community, including an early database informed by surveys and statistical analysis (run by a statistician) matching patient symptoms with different types of cannabis and their effectiveness. A three-year study of 77 patients was published in 2001. Sociologist Wendy Chapkis places WAMM in the context of second wave feminist health care collectives. The Corrals helped draft California Proposition 215, which passed on November 5, 1996. Just two days later, WAMM was incorporated as a non-profit.

== 2002 raid ==
On September 5, 2002, the Corral's home, dispensary, and cannabis farm in Santa Cruz was raided by 30 agents of the Drug Enforcement Administration (DEA) dressed in combat uniforms and equipped with automatic firearms. Neither the Santa Cruz County sheriff's office, police chief, or local officials were notified of the raid by the DEA. Agents arrived early in the morning with guns drawn, placing the Corral family in handcuffs. They took chainsaws to more than 150 cannabis plants and destroyed them, an act that was recorded by Corral's security system and replayed later on KTVU-TV news. (Note: The key video footage was later edited and released as part of the film Waiting to Inhale: Marijuana, Medicine and the Law (2006) by filmmaker Jed Riffe.) Agents transported the Corrals to a federal prison in San Jose where they were put into small holding cells. A standoff ensued, with patients, many of whom were terminally ill and in wheelchairs, gathering to block the road to prevent the DEA from leaving. An agreement was reached to end the blockade in exchange for the release of the Corrals.

More than a week after the raid, WAMM supporters held a rally at Santa Cruz City Hall. Arnold Leff, a physician who worked with WAMM patients and who was a former associate director of the White House Office of Drug Abuse Prevention under President Richard Nixon, attended the event, calling the raid "an outrageous example of a government without compassion". Later, then state attorney general Bill Lockyer questioned why the raid had even been conducted in the first place, and sent a letter to Attorney General John Ashcroft. Asa Hutchinson, then acting DEA administrator, issued a response: "The DEA's responsibility is to enforce our controlled substances laws, and one of them is marijuana. (Note: Sociologist Matt Reid: "The way the [US] government approaches cannabis still defies all logic. They say it has no medical value by classifying it as a Schedule I substance, but they also ship canisters of joints to patients in the IND program. They declare more evidence is needed to change this scheduling though no evidence was consulted in placing cannabis there, and they deny almost all attempts to study cannabis further. Even when citizens practice their democratic rights by voting for changes in cannabis law, elected officials attempt to neutralize such changes in complex bureaucratic maneuvering.") Someone could stand up and say one of those marijuana plants is designed for someone who is sick, but under federal law, there’s no distinction." Santa Cruz officials said that Corral had been cultivating cannabis for a decade and was in compliance with state laws. Christopher Krohn, then mayor of Santa Cruz, said the "raid was unannounced and against the will of the people".

According to The New York Times, the 2002 raid was part of a larger federal attempt by the Bush administration to stop cannabis cultivation and distribution in California after the Supreme Court ruled against medical necessity in United States v. Oakland Cannabis Buyers' Cooperative (2001). The raid on WAMM in Santa Cruz was just one of many, (Note: According to NORML, from September 2001 to October 2002, the DEA raided more than 35 "medicinal marijuana patients, cooperatives and providers in California". These raids are extensively documented in various legal filings.) including raids on cannabis buyer clubs in "West Hollywood, San Francisco, Oakland and Sebastapol". DEA spokesperson Will Glaspy said they only focused on large growers involving farms with 100 or more plants, noting that they couldn't tell the difference between a club and a criminal operation. "What you really have in California", Glaspy told The New York Times, "are people fattening their pocketbooks under the disguise of medicine." Valerie Corral disputed the idea: "That's outrageous, I live off the land. They can check my bank accounts. I'll take a lie-detector test. We're here to help dying people", she said.

The Santa Cruz City Council deputized Valerie and Michael Corral as medical marijuana providers on December 10, 2002.

== WAMM Phytotherapies ==
With the passage of Proposition 64 in 2016, recreational cannabis use was legalized in California. Dispensaries began opening in 2018 under the new law, forcing WAMM to shut its doors for legal reasons. Under the new law, there was no legal way compassionate care services like WAMM could donate authorized products to patients. (Note: "Under state regulations that went into effect...compassionate care programs must collect taxes on the market value of cannabis that they give to patients. Many of these programs say they cannot afford the taxes nor the cost of state and local permits required to obtain cannabis from legal growers." "After the passage of Proposition 64...California began requiring collectives to get licensed like a commercial dispensary. Unable to complete the expensive and complex process, many shut down..."Overnight, our whole system fell apart," said Valerie Corral..."They were so busy counting tax dollars that they put us all out of business." "Frustration runs deep among medical cannabis patients and advocates who — by persuading voters to pass Proposition 215 in 1996 — paved the way for legal weed in California, but now feel left behind in a post-Proposition 64 era. In a profit-centered system focused on recreational sales, they argue there is little consideration for patients and their unique needs. Collectives that once provided cannabis and community largely dissolved nearly five years ago, as California transitioned to a new regulatory framework based around licensed growers and retailers. Dispensaries, which are still prohibited in many parts of the state by local rules, have not widely embraced a replacement program that allows them to donate medical marijuana to patients who cannot afford to buy it. Medical identification cards, which can cost several hundred dollars to renew annually, confer few tangible benefits.") In response to this need, new legislation was written and passed in March 2020. SB-34, The Dennis Peron and Brownie Mary Act, allowed WAMM and other groups like it to reenter the new legal cannabis arena with legitimate licenses of exemption. In 2020, WAMM reorganized and opened its doors as "WAMM Phytotherapies" under the protection of the new law.

== Legacy ==
Valerie's Santa Cruz-based group was one small part of a larger coalition of cannabis activists in California, which was informally headquartered at the San Francisco Cannabis Buyers Club with Dennis Peron and Brownie Mary Rathbun. They were in turn joined by Dale Gieringer of the National Organization for the Reform of Marijuana Laws (NORML), and Jeff Jones from the Oakland Cannabis Buyers Cooperative. Together, they worked on drafts in 1995 for the Compassionate Use Act and later Proposition 215 on the 1996 ballot. In 2003, the Los Angeles Times described Valerie as "the face of Santa Cruz's wildly successful medical marijuana initiative" in the wake of harassment from the federal government. Writing for The New York Times Magazine, Michael Pollan called Valerie "the Florence Nightingale and Johnny Appleseed of medical marijuana rolled into one".

== Selected publications ==
- Corral, Valerie Leveroni (2001). "Differential Effects of Medical Marijuana Based on Strain and Route of Administration". Journal of Cannabis Therapeutics. 1 (3–4): 43–59.

== Notes and references ==
Notes

== Bibliography ==
- "Not Your Average Pot Proponent". Associated Press. May 24, 2004.
- Bailey, Eric (August 11, 2003). "Santa Cruz Clinic Leads Medical Marijuana Charge". Los Angeles Times.
- Booth, William (September 17, 2002). "Santa Cruz Defies U.S. On Marijuana". The Washington Post. Retrieved April 19, 2024.
- Branan, Brad (March 6, 2018). "They used to get free or low-cost marijuana to help with their cancer. Not anymore". The Sacramento Bee. Retrieved April 19, 2024.
- Chapkis, W., Webb, R. J. (2008). Dying to Get High: Marijuana as Medicine. New York: NYU Press. ISBN 0814790097. OCLC 779828407.
- Chapkis, Wendy (2013). "The Trouble with Mary Jane's Gender". Humboldt Journal of Social Relations. 35.
- Clark, Samantha (May 12, 2015). "Santa Cruz collective WAMM fundraising to buy cannabis garden site". Santa Cruz Sentinel. Retrieved April 18, 2024.
- Corral, Valerie Leveroni (2001). "Differential effects of medical marijuana based on strain and route of administration: a three-year observational study". Journal of Cannabis Therapeutics. 1 (3-4): 43-59.
- Grinspoon, Lester, and James B. Bakalar (1997)[1971] Marihuana, The Forbidden Medicine. Rev. and exp. ed. New Haven: Yale University Press. ISBN 0300070853. OCLC 36178980.
- Hecht, Peter (2014). Weed Land: Inside America's Marijuana Epicenter and How Pot went Legit. Berkeley: University of California Press. ISBN 0520275446. OCLC 868277441.
- Heddleston, Thomas R. (June 2012). "From the Frontlines to the Bottom Line: Medical Marijuana, the War on Drugs, and the Drug Policy Reform Movement" (PhD thesis). UC Santa Cruz.
- Heddleston, Thomas (2013). "A Tale of Three Cities: Medical Marijuana, Activism, and Local Regulation in California". Humboldt Journal of Social Relations. 35.
- Ibarra, Nicholas (July 24, 2018). "In Santa Cruz, nation's oldest cannabis co-op still searching for new home". Santa Cruz Sentinel. Retrieved April 18, 2024.
- Koseff, Alexei (August 1, 2023). "Medical cannabis paved the way for legalization in California. Now patients feel left behind". CalMatters. Retrieved April 20, 2024.
- Leduff, Charlie; Liptak, Adam (September 18, 2002). "Defiant California City Hands out Marijuana". The New York Times. p. A22. Retrieved April 19, 2024.
- Nieves, Evelyn (January/February 2001). "Half an ounce of healing". Mother Jones. 26 (1): 48-53.
- Pollan, Michael (July 20, 1997). "Living With Medical Marijuana". The New York Times Magazine.
- Reid, Matt (2020). "Medical Cannabis and Recreational Marijuana: Patient Perceptions, Stigma, and Gender During a Time of Emerging Legalization". (PhD thesis). Western Michigan University.
- Rogers, Paul (March 27, 1993). "Pot Charges Against Epileptic Dismissed: Santa Cruz Woman Had Faced Prison Term". San Jose Mercury News. p. 5B.
- Russo, Ethan B. (May 2017). "Cannabis and epilepsy: An ancient treatment returns to the fore". Epilepsy & Behavior. 70 (B): 292-297.
- Schwartz, Harold I. (1994). Psychiatric Practice under Fire: The Influence of Government, the Media, and Special Interests on Somatic Therapies. Washington, DC: American Psychiatric Press. ISBN 0880484799. OCLC 30738766.
- Stroup, Keith (October 10, 2002). "Federal Suit Charges DEA's Raids Of California Medi-Pot Patients Are Unconstitutional". NORML.
- Tiersky, Marcia (Winter 1999). "Medical Marijuana: Putting the Power Where It Belongs". Northwestern University Law Review 93 (2): 547-595.
- WAMM (February 27, 2020). "Wo/Men’s Alliance for Medical Marijuana will distribute 'compassionate cannabis' on March 1". Voices of Monterey Bay. Press release.
- White, Dan (December 11, 2002). "Pot club founders deputized". Santa Cruz Sentinel.
