= 2016 California Proposition 64 =

Referendum on recreational cannabis

Proposition 64
- Marijuana Legalization; Legalizes marijuana under state law, for use by adults 21 or older. Imposes state taxes on sales and cultivation. Provides for industry licensing and establishes standards for marijuana products. Allows local regulation and taxation. Fiscal Impact: Additional tax revenues ranging from high hundreds of millions of dollars to over $1 billion annually, mostly dedicated to specific purposes. Reduced criminal justice costs of tens of millions of dollars annually.

Results
Choice	Votes	%
Yes	7,979,041	57.13%
No	5,987,020	42.87%
Valid votes	13,966,061	95.59%
Invalid or blank votes	644,448	4.41%
Total votes	14,610,509	100.00%
Registered voters/turnout	19,411,771	75.27%
County results
For
50%–60%
60%–70%
70%–80%
Against
50%–60%

The Adult Use of Marijuana Act (AUMA) (Proposition 64) was a 2016 voter initiative to legalize cannabis in California. The full name is the Control, Regulate and Tax Adult Use of Marijuana Act. The initiative passed with 57% voter approval and became law on November 9, 2016, leading to recreational cannabis sales in California by January 2018.

== History ==
Possession or sale of cannabis in the United States is prohibited by federal law. In 1970, President Richard Nixon signed the Controlled Substances Act, establishing marijuana as a Schedule I drug, the strictest level of prohibition. Voters then rejected California Proposition 19 (1972), which sought to remove the criminalization of marijuana under California law. In 1976, Governor Jerry Brown signed the Moscone Act, which reduced the penalty for possession of marijuana from a felony to a misdemeanor.

Voters passed California Proposition 215 (1996), making California the first state to legalize medical cannabis in the United States. In United States v. Oakland Cannabis Buyers' Cooperative (2001), the Supreme Court of the United States found that California's medical prescription providers were still subject to criminal prosecution. In Gonzales v. Raich (2005), the U.S. Supreme Court found that Congress's interstate Commerce Clause power allowed it to prohibit an Oroville, California, woman, who was following California law, from growing and consuming marijuana entirely inside her home.

In September 2010, Governor Arnold Schwarzenegger signed legislation reducing possession of marijuana from a criminal misdemeanor to a civil infraction. In November voters rejected California Proposition 19 (2010), which would have legalized recreational marijuana use, imposed no state taxes, and allowed employers to fire an employee for workplace use of marijuana only after showing it had caused impaired work.

In 2012, voters passed Washington Initiative 502 and Colorado Amendment 64, which legalized recreational marijuana use in those states. Two other states followed later in 2014, when voters passed Oregon Ballot Measure 91 (2014) and Alaska Measure 2 (2014). In July 2015, Lieutenant Governor Gavin Newsom, the American Civil Liberties Union, and Stanford University faculty released the final report of the Blue Ribbon Commission on Marijuana Policy, which recommended regulations for recreational marijuana use in California.

On November 4, 2014, California Proposition 47 was passed. Also known as the Safe Neighborhood and Schools Act, Proposition 47 changed the possession of controlled substances from a felony to misdemeanor. With possession-related offenses reclassified as misdemeanors, felony charges could be appealed, and successful appeals by convicted offenders would lead to shorter sentences and/or cleaner records.

On May 4, 2016, the group sponsoring the initiative announced that it had collected over 600,000 signatures for the proposal; enough to get it on the 2016 ballot. On June 28, the measure was certified by the Secretary of State for the November ballot. On July 1, the Secretary of State released a list of propositions with AUMA listed as Proposition 64, then later in the day renumbered it to 63; and, on July 2, released a final list restoring it to Proposition 64.

== Content ==
According to California Legislative Analyst's Office, the measure changes California law to legalize the possession, cultivation, and sale of marijuana. Individuals over age 21 are allowed to possess, cultivate, and sell marijuana; the state regulates commercial activities related to commerce for recreational use; a 15% excise tax and an additional $9.25 per ounce of flower or $2.75 per ounce of leaf will be collected; and possession and cultivation of certain amounts for personal use is legalized statewide.

The Adult Use of Marijuana Act (AUMA) (Proposition 64) provides an array of opportunities ranging from economic stimulation of several markets and industries to financial relief of the criminal justice system, which are over-burdened with backlogged and pending cases for non-violent cannabis offenders. Revenue paid into the new California Marijuana Tax Fund will allocate 60% of outflows to youth programs, 20% to environmental damage clean-up, and 20% to public safety.

Under Prop 64, new state regulation laws will require stringent product development systems to establish distributional industry standards regarding testing, packaging, and labeling.

Prop 64's new state regulations provide a platform for a fully transparent, highly efficient seed-to-sale tracking system through the newly created State Regulatory Agency—the Bureau of Marijuana Control—formerly known as the Bureau of Medical Cannabis Regulation.

Additionally, the Medical Marijuana Industry will be regulated by several other state agencies: the California Department of Food and Agriculture (to license and regulate marijuana cultivation); the California Department of Public Health (to license and monitor manufacturing of marijuana edibles); the California State Water Resources Control Board (to "regulate the environmental impacts of marijuana growing on water quality"); the California Department of Fish and Wildlife (to regulate cultivation-related impacts on local environments); and the California Department of Pesticide Regulation (to regulate nutrients and pesticides utilized for marijuana cultivation).

AUMA allows adults to possess up to an ounce of marijuana. Adults are also allowed to cultivate up to six marijuana plants inside their homes. Marijuana packaging is now required to provide the net weight, origin, age, and type of the product, as well as the milligram amount per serving of tetrahydrocannabinol, cannabidiol, and other cannabinoids, and if any pesticides were used during cultivation.

Smoking marijuana in public is subject to a $100 fine. Driving under the influence of marijuana remains illegal, although some California Highway Patrol officers are concerned that they will be unable to identify intoxicated drivers. The penalty for unlicensed sale of marijuana is now reduced from four years in state prison to six months in county jail.

Businesses selling marijuana require a license from the state-level Bureau of Marijuana Control, and local governments decide permits for businesses to allow on-site consumption. Marijuana shops are prohibited from the sale or consumption of alcohol or tobacco. Local governments are allowed to completely ban marijuana-related businesses.

== Reactions and analysis ==
State financial analysts estimated Proposition 64 could increase tax revenue by hundreds of millions to one billion dollars. Independent analysts estimated the measure would reduce state and local government expenditures by tens of millions of dollars.

NORML endorsed the initiative as of March 2016, saying "as well as one of the world's largest economies, California is arguably the most important state to consider marijuana legalization this year." California has the biggest legal cannabis market in the United States due to high population density and high cultivation rates. California NORML called the proposition's vote "crucial" and said, "Although Prop 64 has drawbacks and isn’t all it should be from a consumer perspective, on balance it offers significant improvements over California’s current laws and would be a powerful boost for cannabis reform nationwide."

Ballotpedia called the measure "a clear leader and the most likely to reach the ballot in November 2016".

The Los Angeles Times stated in February, 2016 that the measure was one of 20 legalization initiatives for the 2016 ballot and was the "clear favorite to make the November ballot" due to support from individual donors and well-funded advocacy groups. Billionaire Sean Parker donated $1 million to the effort to get the measure on the ballot, and Weedmaps donated $500,000.

Newsweek stated the success of the initiative would be influential given California's national importance as a "regulatory laboratory", and Reason magazine stated it was poised to approximately triple the number of U.S. residents living in states with legalization. Deseret News (Salt Lake City) expressed concern over a "potential problem when it comes to minorities and recreational marijuana" if the measure passed. Deseret News cited an NPR report from Colorado to conclude that in California, white youth arrests could fall faster than those of minorities, or minority arrests could even increase due to lack of minority access to legal sales and nonwhite ownership of cannabis businesses, worsening the effect of "systemic racism" in pursuing drug crime.

The emerging legal marijuana industry is overwhelmingly white-owned and white-dominated and provides good access to white customers," he says. "So one possibility is that that leaves the illegal market disproportionately composed of people of color, both the buyers and the sellers.

— Keith Humphreys, Stanford University, Morning Edition (NPR)

California Proposition 64 helps to remedy marijuana related incarceration rates considerably. However, some argue that the passing of the MORE Act is a necessary next step down the path of decriminalization of the substance, as it would remove cannabis from the controlled substances list and declassify marijuana as a schedule 1 drug.

The MORE Act could potentially help to remedy some of the racial disparities within America's criminal justice system that proposition 64 does not address. According to Forbes roughly 40000 remain behind bars due to cannabis related charges as of 2020. With the racial gap widening over the past 20 years after the War On Drugs campaign took off, a jump from 3:1 to 5:1 between Black and White incarceration rates occurred. In 2014, black people made up roughly 14% of the 127,000 drug charges in California.

While Proposition 64 decriminalizes the possession of up to 1 ounce of marijuana, the effects are not immediately felt by those with charges made prior to the passing of this law. Those with prior convictions must still petition for shorter sentences, release, or a change from felony to misdemeanor on their records.

The MORE Act calls for a more transparent system in regards to cannabis companies employer/employee demographics which might help to mitigate issues of monopolization within California's cannabis industry that arouse after proposition 64 was passed in 2016.

=== Supporters ===
The California Medical Association endorsed the measure in February 2016. United States Representative Dana Rohrabacher, a Republican, endorsed AUMA in late April 2016. Presidential candidate Bernie Sanders indicated his support for AUMA while campaigning in California in May 2016. The California Democratic Party endorsed AUMA in June 2016. On July 21, 2016, The Sacramento Bee reported that Gov. Gary Johnson, Libertarian candidate for President, endorsed California's initiative to legalize marijuana. Former Speaker of the House Nancy Pelosi endorsed it a few days before the election, becoming "one of the highest ranking politicians ... openly supporting legalization".

Proponents spent $24.7 million fighting for the measure, with the top contribution being $8.8 million from Sean Parker and affiliates. The measure was supported by the editorial boards of the Los Angeles Times and the San Francisco Chronicle.

=== Opponents ===
A number of organizations like the California Association of Highway Patrolmen, the California Hospitals Association, and the Automobile Club of Southern California expressed opposition to the initiative. The California Teamsters Union switched their position to neutral after contributing a relatively large amount to the opposition campaign. According to Capital Public Radio, a Sacramento Superior Court judge ordered the ballot's official arguments to be rewritten, after U.S. Senator Dianne Feinstein's claim that Proposition 64 would allow marijuana advertising on primetime television was debunked as "mostly false" by PolitiFact.com.

Opponents spent $1.6 million fighting the measure. The measure was opposed by the editorial board of The Sacramento Bee.

=== Public opinion ===
Public opinion on the legalization of recreational marijuana in California
Poll source	Date(s) administered	Sample size	Margin of error	% support	% opposition	% Undecided/Don't Know
Insights West	November 4–6, 2016	401 LV	± 4.9%	55%	39%	5%
SurveyUSA	October 28–31, 2016	747 LV and EV	± 3.6%	54%	39%	6% (Note: 6 likely or early voters, or 1% of the sample (with rounding), stated that they would not vote on Proposition 64.)
Field/YouGov	October 25–31, 2016	998 LV	N/A	57%	40%	3%
Public Policy Institute of California	October 14–23, 2016	1024 LV	± 4.3%	55%	38%	6%
SurveyUSA	October 13–15, 2016	725 LV and EV	± 3.6%	51%	40%	8% (Note: 6 likely or early voters, or 1% of the sample (with rounding), stated that they would not vote on Proposition 64.)
CalSpeaks Sacramento State	October 7–13, 2016	622 LV	± 7%	60%	30%	10%
Hoover Institution/YouGov	October 4–14, 2016	1247 LV	± 3.28%	56%	34%	10%
SurveyUSA	September 27–28, 2016	751 LV	± 3.6%	52%	41%	6% (Note: 4 likely voters, or 1% of the sample (with rounding), stated that they would not vote on Proposition 64.)
Insights West	September 12–14, 2016	515 LV	± 4.3%	64%	30%	6%
Public Policy Institute of California	September 9–18, 2016	1055 LV	± 4.5%	60%	36%	4%
SurveyUSA	September 8–11, 2016	712 LV	± 3.7%	52%	40%	8%
Field/YouGov	September 7–13, 2016	942 LV	N/A	60%	31%	9%
Smith Johnson Research	August 17–19, 2016	500 LV	± 4.4%	56%	40%	5%
Probolsky Research	August 5–8, 2016	1020 LV	± 3.1%	61.8%	34.9%	3.3%
Institute of Governmental Studies	June 29–July 18, 2016	3020 RV	N/A	63.8%	36.2%	0%
Public Policy Institute of California	May 13–22, 2016	996 LV	± 4.3%	60%	37%	3%
Public Policy Institute of California	May 13–22, 2016	1704 AV	± 3.3%	55%	43%	3%
Probolsky Research	February 11–14, 2016	1000 LV	± 3.1%	59.9%	36.7%	3.4%
Public Policy Institute of California	May 17–27, 2015	1048 LV	± 4.6%	56%	41%	3%
Public Policy Institute of California	May 17–27, 2015	1706 AV	± 3.6%	54%	44%	2%

== Results by city ==
Official outcome by city and unincorporated areas of counties, of which Yes won 393, No won 144, and 1 tied.
City	County	Yes		No		Margin		Total Votes	Swing from 2016 Presidential (Clinton to "Yes")%
City	County	#	%	#	%	#	%	Total Votes	Swing from 2016 Presidential (Clinton to "Yes")%
Alameda	Alameda	25,392	68.83%	11,498	31.17%	13,894	37.66%	36,890	-29.68%
Albany	Alameda	6,858	76.09%	2,155	23.91%	4,703	52.18%	9,013	-29.50%
Berkeley	Alameda	51,540	83.49%	10,191	16.51%	41,349	66.98%	61,731	-20.20%
Dublin	Alameda	11,629	57.50%	8,595	42.50%	3,034	15.00%	20,224	-29.57%
Emeryville	Alameda	4,214	80.70%	1,008	19.30%	3,206	61.39%	5,222	-21.05%
Fremont	Alameda	38,839	53.46%	33,812	46.54%	5,027	6.92%	72,651	-44.86%
Hayward	Alameda	27,247	59.98%	18,177	40.02%	9,070	19.97%	45,424	-44.29%
Livermore	Alameda	22,513	57.67%	16,527	42.33%	5,986	15.33%	39,040	-6.60%
Newark	Alameda	8,643	57.30%	6,440	42.70%	2,203	14.61%	15,083	-38.06%
Oakland	Alameda	132,224	76.88%	39,753	23.12%	92,471	53.77%	171,977	-30.84%
Piedmont	Alameda	4,809	67.62%	2,303	32.38%	2,506	35.24%	7,112	-36.85%
Pleasanton	Alameda	19,134	55.93%	15,076	44.07%	4,058	11.86%	34,210	-20.89%
San Leandro	Alameda	18,482	59.62%	12,516	40.38%	5,966	19.25%	30,998	-42.82%
Union City	Alameda	13,270	55.63%	10,585	44.37%	2,685	11.26%	23,855	-50.83%
Unincorporated Area	Alameda	32,805	59.17%	22,641	40.83%	10,164	18.33%	55,446	-30.23%
Unincorporated Area	Alpine	370	62.29%	224	37.71%	146	24.58%	594	5.08%
Amador	Amador	84	67.74%	40	32.26%	44	35.48%	124	19.91%
Ione	Amador	931	45.04%	1,136	54.96%	-205	-9.92%	2,067	23.27%
Jackson	Amador	1,043	48.53%	1,106	51.47%	-63	-2.93%	2,149	11.76%
Plymouth	Amador	204	45.03%	249	54.97%	-45	-9.93%	453	21.30%
Sutter Creek	Amador	705	49.16%	729	50.84%	-24	-1.67%	1,434	14.46%
Unincorporated Area	Amador	5,640	48.32%	6,031	51.68%	-391	-3.35%	11,671	24.15%
Biggs	Butte	271	46.25%	315	53.75%	-44	-7.51%	586	14.98%
Chico	Butte	22,784	60.85%	14,658	39.15%	8,126	21.70%	37,442	-0.83%
Gridley	Butte	942	45.62%	1,123	54.38%	-181	-8.77%	2,065	-5.92%
Oroville	Butte	2,746	51.67%	2,569	48.33%	177	3.33%	5,315	20.47%
Paradise	Butte	6,681	50.43%	6,568	49.57%	113	0.85%	13,249	17.46%
Unincorporated Area	Butte	17,610	47.50%	19,464	52.50%	-1,854	-5.00%	37,074	18.58%
Angels	Calaveras	823	43.45%	1,071	56.55%	-248	-13.09%	1,894	5.87%
Unincorporated Area	Calaveras	10,291	47.73%	11,270	52.27%	-979	-4.54%	21,561	20.07%
Colusa	Colusa	1,187	45.43%	1,426	54.57%	-239	-9.15%	2,613	12.88%
Williams	Colusa	475	46.61%	544	53.39%	-69	-6.77%	1,019	-43.29%
Unincorporated Area	Colusa	1,196	41.23%	1,705	58.77%	-509	-17.55%	2,901	5.96%
Antioch	Contra Costa	21,849	60.08%	14,517	39.92%	7,332	20.16%	36,366	-24.51%
Brentwood	Contra Costa	13,198	53.82%	11,326	46.18%	1,872	7.63%	24,524	-5.92%
Clayton	Contra Costa	3,538	53.83%	3,034	46.17%	504	7.67%	6,572	-8.35%
Concord	Contra Costa	29,736	60.96%	19,043	39.04%	10,693	21.92%	48,779	-16.70%
Danville	Contra Costa	13,437	55.07%	10,962	44.93%	2,475	10.14%	24,399	-13.49%
El Cerrito	Contra Costa	9,557	73.13%	3,512	26.87%	6,045	46.25%	13,069	-32.65%
Hercules	Contra Costa	6,111	58.56%	4,324	41.44%	1,787	17.13%	10,435	-47.28%
Lafayette	Contra Costa	9,544	64.07%	5,352	35.93%	4,192	28.14%	14,896	-22.90%
Martinez	Contra Costa	11,905	63.42%	6,867	36.58%	5,038	26.84%	18,772	-11.31%
Moraga	Contra Costa	5,132	57.30%	3,824	42.70%	1,308	14.60%	8,956	-31.22%
Oakley	Contra Costa	8,207	58.45%	5,834	41.55%	2,373	16.90%	14,041	-2.19%
Orinda	Contra Costa	7,318	62.56%	4,379	37.44%	2,939	25.13%	11,697	-29.20%
Pinole	Contra Costa	5,197	62.25%	3,152	37.75%	2,045	24.49%	8,349	-30.32%
Pittsburg	Contra Costa	12,986	60.63%	8,431	39.37%	4,555	21.27%	21,417	-37.79%
Pleasant Hill	Contra Costa	10,720	63.98%	6,036	36.02%	4,684	27.95%	16,756	-18.25%
Richmond	Contra Costa	24,842	69.59%	10,857	30.41%	13,985	39.17%	35,699	-39.90%
San Pablo	Contra Costa	4,187	61.61%	2,609	38.39%	1,578	23.22%	6,796	-56.29%
San Ramon	Contra Costa	16,827	53.01%	14,914	46.99%	1,913	6.03%	31,741	-33.21%
Walnut Creek	Contra Costa	22,697	60.80%	14,635	39.20%	8,062	21.60%	37,332	-23.59%
Unincorporated Area	Contra Costa	44,844	60.94%	28,742	39.06%	16,102	21.88%	73,586	-13.22%
Crescent City	Del Norte	772	66.04%	397	33.96%	375	32.08%	1,169	33.58%
Unincorporated Area	Del Norte	4,902	58.58%	3,466	41.42%	1,436	17.16%	8,368	36.99%
Placerville	El Dorado	2,548	55.18%	2,070	44.82%	478	10.35%	4,618	10.42%
South Lake Tahoe	El Dorado	4,571	65.26%	2,433	34.74%	2,138	30.53%	7,004	2.63%
Unincorporated Area	El Dorado	39,928	48.34%	42,667	51.66%	-2,739	-3.32%	82,595	14.99%
Clovis	Fresno	18,633	43.10%	24,601	56.90%	-5,968	-13.80%	43,234	7.04%
Coalinga	Fresno	1,697	53.11%	1,498	46.89%	199	6.23%	3,195	11.59%
Firebaugh	Fresno	601	42.41%	816	57.59%	-215	-15.17%	1,417	-61.04%
Fowler	Fresno	852	44.40%	1,067	55.60%	-215	-11.20%	1,919	-30.37%
Fresno	Fresno	73,305	51.38%	69,377	48.62%	3,928	2.75%	142,682	-17.11%
Huron	Fresno	288	46.23%	335	53.77%	-47	-7.54%	623	-88.09%
Kerman	Fresno	1,586	47.50%	1,753	52.50%	-167	-5.00%	3,339	-30.84%
Kingsburg	Fresno	1,601	34.70%	3,013	65.30%	-1,412	-30.60%	4,614	5.11%
Mendota	Fresno	580	45.21%	703	54.79%	-123	-9.59%	1,283	-76.58%
Orange Cove	Fresno	649	46.19%	756	53.81%	-107	-7.62%	1,405	-75.34%
Parlier	Fresno	1,190	52.06%	1,096	47.94%	94	4.11%	2,286	-67.45%
Reedley	Fresno	2,424	40.35%	3,584	59.65%	-1,160	-19.31%	6,008	-26.61%
San Joaquin	Fresno	294	52.69%	264	47.31%	30	5.38%	558	-68.93%
Sanger	Fresno	3,031	45.97%	3,562	54.03%	-531	-8.05%	6,593	-39.35%
Selma	Fresno	2,518	45.47%	3,020	54.53%	-502	-9.06%	5,538	-31.89%
Unincorporated Area	Fresno	23,515	41.26%	33,478	58.74%	-9,963	-17.48%	56,993	0.95%
Orland	Glenn	1,189	52.70%	1,067	47.30%	122	5.41%	2,256	13.58%
Willows & Unincorporated Area (Note: From California's Supplement to the Statement of Vote: Glenn County is unable to provide jurisdictional breakdowns for the City of Willows. Therefore, these vote totals are combined in a line item identified as Willows and Unincorporated area of Glenn County.)	Glenn	3,223	44.75%	3,979	55.25%	-756	-10.50%	7,202	25.07%
Arcata	Humboldt	6,163	70.92%	2,527	29.08%	3,636	41.84%	8,690	-20.06%
Blue Lake	Humboldt	432	65.45%	228	34.55%	204	30.91%	660	-6.38%
Eureka	Humboldt	6,815	63.82%	3,864	36.18%	2,951	27.63%	10,679	-2.77%
Ferndale	Humboldt	427	51.45%	403	48.55%	24	2.89%	830	-5.13%
Fortuna	Humboldt	2,332	48.84%	2,443	51.16%	-111	-2.32%	4,775	6.63%
Rio Dell	Humboldt	520	46.89%	589	53.11%	-69	-6.22%	1,109	7.43%
Trinidad	Humboldt	144	67.61%	69	32.39%	75	35.21%	213	-18.82%
Unincorporated Area	Humboldt	17,859	55.12%	14,543	44.88%	3,316	10.23%	32,402	-10.54%
Brawley	Imperial	2,914	44.67%	3,610	55.33%	-696	-10.67%	6,524	-40.79%
Calexico	Imperial	5,113	45.52%	6,119	54.48%	-1,006	-8.96%	11,232	-85.47%
Calipatria	Imperial	357	48.05%	386	51.95%	-29	-3.90%	743	-42.68%
El Centro	Imperial	5,613	45.61%	6,694	54.39%	-1,081	-8.78%	12,307	-51.59%
Holtville	Imperial	709	45.39%	853	54.61%	-144	-9.22%	1,562	-44.63%
Imperial	Imperial	2,378	44.82%	2,928	55.18%	-550	-10.37%	5,306	-26.63%
Westmorland	Imperial	198	41.16%	283	58.84%	-85	-17.67%	481	-66.55%
Unincorporated Area	Imperial	3,626	45.39%	4,363	54.61%	-737	-9.23%	7,989	-27.25%
Bishop	Inyo	815	60.10%	541	39.90%	274	20.21%	1,356	18.88%
Unincorporated Area	Inyo	3,613	53.85%	3,096	46.15%	517	7.71%	6,709	24.43%
Arvin	Kern	1,064	44.84%	1,309	55.16%	-245	-10.32%	2,373	-74.73%
Bakersfield	Kern	52,473	46.06%	61,442	53.94%	-8,969	-7.87%	113,915	-1.51%
California City	Kern	2,273	59.22%	1,565	40.78%	708	18.45%	3,838	35.61%
Delano	Kern	3,290	45.15%	3,997	54.85%	-707	-9.70%	7,287	-66.06%
Maricopa	Kern	166	52.04%	153	47.96%	13	4.08%	319	74.87%
McFarland	Kern	847	43.46%	1,102	56.54%	-255	-13.08%	1,949	-72.18%
Ridgecrest	Kern	5,388	50.29%	5,325	49.71%	63	0.59%	10,713	30.95%
Shafter	Kern	1,390	40.49%	2,043	59.51%	-653	-19.02%	3,433	-32.11%
Taft	Kern	890	41.96%	1,231	58.04%	-341	-16.08%	2,121	47.49%
Tehachapi	Kern	1,540	47.40%	1,709	52.60%	-169	-5.20%	3,249	29.33%
Wasco	Kern	1,574	43.31%	2,060	56.69%	-486	-13.37%	3,634	-42.57%
Unincorporated Area	Kern	41,037	46.16%	47,872	53.84%	-6,835	-7.69%	88,909	21.08%
Avenal	Kings	487	49.95%	488	50.05%	-1	-0.10%	975	-48.80%
Corcoran	Kings	1,115	45.20%	1,352	54.80%	-237	-9.61%	2,467	-37.81%
Hanford	Kings	6,923	43.65%	8,938	56.35%	-2,015	-12.70%	15,861	1.56%
Lemoore	Kings	3,111	46.41%	3,592	53.59%	-481	-7.18%	6,703	11.08%
Unincorporated Area	Kings	2,926	39.52%	4,477	60.48%	-1,551	-20.95%	7,403	7.89%
Clearlake	Lake	2,458	62.51%	1,474	37.49%	984	25.03%	3,932	10.88%
Lakeport	Lake	1,149	55.16%	934	44.84%	215	10.32%	2,083	3.68%
Unincorporated Area	Lake	10,629	58.14%	7,654	41.86%	2,975	16.27%	18,283	15.18%
Susanville	Lassen	1,719	49.97%	1,721	50.03%	-2	-0.06%	3,440	41.88%
Unincorporated Area	Lassen	3,120	43.51%	4,050	56.49%	-930	-12.97%	7,170	42.89%
Agoura Hills	Los Angeles	6,695	61.71%	4,154	38.29%	2,541	23.42%	10,849	-0.97%
Alhambra	Los Angeles	13,135	53.64%	11,351	46.36%	1,784	7.29%	24,486	-43.06%
Arcadia	Los Angeles	7,808	44.22%	9,848	55.78%	-2,040	-11.55%	17,656	-30.91%
Artesia	Los Angeles	2,224	49.77%	2,245	50.23%	-21	-0.47%	4,469	-39.55%
Avalon	Los Angeles	619	52.41%	562	47.59%	57	4.83%	1,181	-6.80%
Azusa	Los Angeles	7,008	54.22%	5,918	45.78%	1,090	8.43%	12,926	-32.92%
Baldwin Park	Los Angeles	9,905	54.10%	8,403	45.90%	1,502	8.20%	18,308	-56.78%
Bell	Los Angeles	3,889	52.68%	3,493	47.32%	396	5.36%	7,382	-71.12%
Bell Gardens	Los Angeles	4,471	54.57%	3,722	45.43%	749	9.14%	8,193	-70.18%
Bellflower	Los Angeles	12,066	54.57%	10,044	45.43%	2,022	9.15%	22,110	-35.22%
Beverly Hills	Los Angeles	9,288	64.18%	5,183	35.82%	4,105	28.37%	14,471	-2.82%
Bradbury	Los Angeles	186	49.08%	193	50.92%	-7	-1.85%	379	-1.06%
Burbank	Los Angeles	27,760	61.30%	17,526	38.70%	10,234	22.60%	45,286	-16.49%
Calabasas	Los Angeles	7,214	62.42%	4,344	37.58%	2,870	24.83%	11,558	-5.46%
Carson	Los Angeles	19,517	55.75%	15,494	44.25%	4,023	11.49%	35,011	-51.31%
Cerritos	Los Angeles	9,028	43.93%	11,523	56.07%	-2,495	-12.14%	20,551	-43.27%
Claremont	Los Angeles	9,918	59.21%	6,833	40.79%	3,085	18.42%	16,751	-17.88%
Commerce	Los Angeles	2,264	54.98%	1,854	45.02%	410	9.96%	4,118	-61.37%
Compton	Los Angeles	15,498	62.16%	9,436	37.84%	6,062	24.31%	24,934	-63.14%
Covina	Los Angeles	9,684	51.95%	8,956	48.05%	728	3.91%	18,640	-21.07%
Cudahy	Los Angeles	2,405	55.34%	1,941	44.66%	464	10.68%	4,346	-68.91%
Culver City	Los Angeles	14,322	68.86%	6,477	31.14%	7,845	37.72%	20,799	-29.19%
Diamond Bar	Los Angeles	9,270	47.12%	10,405	52.88%	-1,135	-5.77%	19,675	-27.29%
Downey	Los Angeles	19,244	50.60%	18,786	49.40%	458	1.20%	38,030	-42.99%
Duarte	Los Angeles	4,469	54.27%	3,766	45.73%	703	8.54%	8,235	-30.75%
El Monte	Los Angeles	11,563	54.50%	9,655	45.50%	1,908	8.99%	21,218	-51.33%
El Segundo	Los Angeles	5,375	60.62%	3,491	39.38%	1,884	21.25%	8,866	-1.91%
Gardena	Los Angeles	10,975	56.79%	8,351	43.21%	2,624	13.58%	19,326	-49.50%
Glendale	Los Angeles	33,845	54.78%	27,942	45.22%	5,903	9.55%	61,787	-21.21%
Glendora	Los Angeles	11,174	48.62%	11,807	51.38%	-633	-2.75%	22,981	3.60%
Hawaiian Gardens	Los Angeles	1,564	54.94%	1,283	45.06%	281	9.87%	2,847	-52.86%
Hawthorne	Los Angeles	14,417	59.42%	9,846	40.58%	4,571	18.84%	24,263	-49.40%
Hermosa Beach	Los Angeles	7,495	70.96%	3,068	29.04%	4,427	41.91%	10,563	5.36%
Hidden Hills	Los Angeles	645	62.08%	394	37.92%	251	24.16%	1,039	2.91%
Huntington Park	Los Angeles	5,816	51.33%	5,514	48.67%	302	2.67%	11,330	-76.70%
Industry	Los Angeles	260	42.98%	345	57.02%	-85	-14.05%	605	-35.21%
Inglewood	Los Angeles	23,827	63.76%	13,541	36.24%	10,286	27.53%	37,368	-58.37%
Irwindale	Los Angeles	338	54.52%	282	45.48%	56	9.03%	620	-41.90%
La Canada Flintridge	Los Angeles	5,336	48.25%	5,722	51.75%	-386	-3.49%	11,058	-23.38%
La Habra Heights	Los Angeles	1,317	48.78%	1,383	51.22%	-66	-2.44%	2,700	14.39%
La Mirada	Los Angeles	9,124	47.15%	10,226	52.85%	-1,102	-5.70%	19,350	-15.95%
La Puente	Los Angeles	5,425	52.99%	4,813	47.01%	612	5.98%	10,238	-56.93%
La Verne	Los Angeles	7,411	48.82%	7,770	51.18%	-359	-2.36%	15,181	-1.67%
Lakewood	Los Angeles	18,925	54.91%	15,539	45.09%	3,386	9.82%	34,464	-12.08%
Lancaster	Los Angeles	27,140	54.05%	23,070	45.95%	4,070	8.11%	50,210	-4.19%
Lawndale	Los Angeles	5,181	58.22%	3,718	41.78%	1,463	16.44%	8,899	-41.70%
Lomita	Los Angeles	4,403	55.36%	3,550	44.64%	853	10.73%	7,953	-7.46%
Long Beach	Los Angeles	102,045	63.68%	58,210	36.32%	43,835	27.35%	160,255	-20.79%
Los Angeles	Los Angeles	808,883	64.56%	444,048	35.44%	364,835	29.12%	1,252,931	-32.97%
Lynwood	Los Angeles	8,579	54.76%	7,087	45.24%	1,492	9.52%	15,666	-74.09%
Malibu	Los Angeles	4,477	68.60%	2,049	31.40%	2,428	37.21%	6,526	2.89%
Manhattan Beach	Los Angeles	12,077	61.62%	7,521	38.38%	4,556	23.25%	19,598	-8.52%
Maywood	Los Angeles	2,916	51.23%	2,776	48.77%	140	2.46%	5,692	-77.70%
Monrovia	Los Angeles	8,657	57.03%	6,524	42.97%	2,133	14.05%	15,181	-17.10%
Montebello	Los Angeles	10,423	53.90%	8,914	46.10%	1,509	7.80%	19,337	-51.85%
Monterey Park	Los Angeles	7,933	49.21%	8,187	50.79%	-254	-1.58%	16,120	-47.06%
Norwalk	Los Angeles	16,328	52.69%	14,660	47.31%	1,668	5.38%	30,988	-47.26%
Palmdale	Los Angeles	26,392	55.29%	21,346	44.71%	5,046	10.57%	47,738	-19.54%
Palos Verdes Estates	Los Angeles	3,733	48.41%	3,978	51.59%	-245	-3.18%	7,711	-8.66%
Paramount	Los Angeles	7,106	56.17%	5,544	43.83%	1,562	12.35%	12,650	-61.27%
Pasadena	Los Angeles	36,992	62.74%	21,966	37.26%	15,026	25.49%	58,958	-30.61%
Pico Rivera	Los Angeles	11,363	52.79%	10,162	47.21%	1,201	5.58%	21,525	-58.12%
Pomona	Los Angeles	21,252	56.84%	16,134	43.16%	5,118	13.69%	37,386	-39.81%
Rancho Palos Verdes	Los Angeles	9,942	47.60%	10,946	52.40%	-1,004	-4.81%	20,888	-15.90%
Redondo Beach	Los Angeles	21,857	64.76%	11,894	35.24%	9,963	29.52%	33,751	-2.18%
Rolling Hills	Los Angeles	528	47.14%	592	52.86%	-64	-5.71%	1,120	17.89%
Rolling Hills Estates	Los Angeles	2,036	46.99%	2,297	53.01%	-261	-6.02%	4,333	-10.81%
Rosemead	Los Angeles	5,615	52.74%	5,032	47.26%	583	5.48%	10,647	-49.76%
San Dimas	Los Angeles	7,477	49.24%	7,707	50.76%	-230	-1.51%	15,184	-2.46%
San Fernando	Los Angeles	3,700	55.01%	3,026	44.99%	674	10.02%	6,726	-57.10%
San Gabriel	Los Angeles	5,240	51.53%	4,929	48.47%	311	3.06%	10,169	-38.40%
San Marino	Los Angeles	2,439	43.60%	3,155	56.40%	-716	-12.80%	5,594	-28.34%
Santa Clarita	Los Angeles	45,464	52.52%	41,094	47.48%	4,370	5.05%	86,558	1.85%
Santa Fe Springs	Los Angeles	3,442	51.67%	3,219	48.33%	223	3.35%	6,661	-45.86%
Santa Monica	Los Angeles	36,510	74.99%	12,177	25.01%	24,333	49.98%	48,687	-15.78%
Sierra Madre	Los Angeles	3,762	58.57%	2,661	41.43%	1,101	17.14%	6,423	-11.33%
Signal Hill	Los Angeles	2,733	63.99%	1,538	36.01%	1,195	27.98%	4,271	-19.77%
South El Monte	Los Angeles	2,524	55.50%	2,024	44.50%	500	10.99%	4,548	-57.25%
South Gate	Los Angeles	12,917	52.87%	11,515	47.13%	1,402	5.74%	24,432	-69.38%
South Pasadena	Los Angeles	7,986	62.45%	4,801	37.55%	3,185	24.91%	12,787	-31.44%
Temple City	Los Angeles	5,118	46.95%	5,783	53.05%	-665	-6.10%	10,901	-29.72%
Torrance	Los Angeles	31,376	52.01%	28,946	47.99%	2,430	4.03%	60,322	-15.40%
Vernon	Los Angeles	23	54.76%	19	45.24%	4	9.52%	42	-46.73%
Walnut	Los Angeles	4,937	46.67%	5,641	53.33%	-704	-6.66%	10,578	-35.56%
West Covina	Los Angeles	17,950	51.11%	17,172	48.89%	778	2.22%	35,122	-36.23%
West Hollywood	Los Angeles	15,867	83.16%	3,213	16.84%	12,654	66.32%	19,080	-6.21%
Westlake Village	Los Angeles	2,607	56.26%	2,027	43.74%	580	12.52%	4,634	0.24%
Whittier	Los Angeles	17,588	52.61%	15,840	47.39%	1,748	5.23%	33,428	-23.00%
Unincorporated Area	Los Angeles	182,309	55.58%	145,705	44.42%	36,604	11.16%	328,014	-33.84%
Chowchilla	Madera	1,568	45.50%	1,878	54.50%	-310	-9.00%	3,446	13.87%
Madera	Madera	5,707	47.11%	6,408	52.89%	-701	-5.79%	12,115	-24.56%
Unincorporated Area	Madera	12,073	43.63%	15,597	56.37%	-3,524	-12.74%	27,670	15.87%
Belvedere	Marin	782	61.14%	497	38.86%	285	22.28%	1,279	-25.48%
Corte Madera	Marin	3,700	68.24%	1,722	31.76%	1,978	36.48%	5,422	-32.96%
Fairfax	Marin	3,773	77.54%	1,093	22.46%	2,680	55.08%	4,866	-22.73%
Larkspur	Marin	5,213	68.87%	2,356	31.13%	2,857	37.75%	7,569	-27.66%
Mill Valley	Marin	6,599	74.19%	2,296	25.81%	4,303	48.38%	8,895	-30.22%
Novato	Marin	17,202	64.79%	9,347	35.21%	7,855	29.59%	26,549	-18.73%
Ross	Marin	870	61.14%	553	38.86%	317	22.28%	1,423	-30.45%
San Anselmo	Marin	5,853	73.99%	2,057	26.01%	3,796	47.99%	7,910	-27.76%
San Rafael	Marin	18,317	69.13%	8,179	30.87%	10,138	38.26%	26,496	-25.66%
Sausalito	Marin	3,617	77.32%	1,061	22.68%	2,556	54.64%	4,678	-13.08%
Tiburon	Marin	3,452	65.38%	1,828	34.62%	1,624	30.76%	5,280	-24.97%
Unincorporated Area	Marin	26,823	70.89%	11,014	29.11%	15,809	41.78%	37,837	-22.26%
Unincorporated Area	Mariposa	4,618	51.35%	4,375	48.65%	243	2.70%	8,993	25.94%
Fort Bragg	Mendocino	1,672	62.72%	994	37.28%	678	25.43%	2,666	-15.93%
Point Arena	Mendocino	130	64.04%	73	35.96%	57	28.08%	203	-32.13%
Ukiah	Mendocino	3,307	55.90%	2,609	44.10%	698	11.80%	5,916	-19.14%
Willits	Mendocino	999	54.59%	831	45.41%	168	9.18%	1,830	-14.23%
Unincorporated Area	Mendocino	14,225	52.97%	12,628	47.03%	1,597	5.95%	26,853	-23.77%
Atwater	Merced	4,210	51.15%	4,021	48.85%	189	2.30%	8,231	-0.10%
Dos Palos	Merced	638	47.79%	697	52.21%	-59	-4.42%	1,335	-10.14%
Gustine	Merced	793	50.25%	785	49.75%	8	0.51%	1,578	-1.18%
Livingston	Merced	1,593	54.63%	1,323	45.37%	270	9.26%	2,916	-55.56%
Los Banos	Merced	5,339	54.36%	4,482	45.64%	857	8.73%	9,821	-16.01%
Merced	Merced	12,401	55.75%	9,842	44.25%	2,559	11.50%	22,243	-11.19%
Unincorporated Area	Merced	11,010	46.31%	12,766	53.69%	-1,756	-7.39%	23,776	-2.53%
Alturas	Modoc	537	54.35%	451	45.65%	86	8.70%	988	49.10%
Unincorporated Area	Modoc	1,219	43.33%	1,594	56.67%	-375	-13.33%	2,813	37.85%
Mammoth Lakes	Mono	1,727	65.37%	915	34.63%	812	30.73%	2,642	-0.32%
Unincorporated Area	Mono	1,576	57.90%	1,146	42.10%	430	15.80%	2,722	21.09%
Carmel-by-the-Sea	Monterey	1,422	63.94%	802	36.06%	620	27.88%	2,224	-5.33%
Del Rey Oaks	Monterey	637	68.49%	293	31.51%	344	36.99%	930	0.50%
Gonzales	Monterey	1,154	57.13%	866	42.87%	288	14.26%	2,020	-49.18%
Greenfield	Monterey	1,595	52.68%	1,433	47.32%	162	5.35%	3,028	-60.71%
King City	Monterey	1,288	60.36%	846	39.64%	442	20.71%	2,134	-24.09%
Marina	Monterey	4,745	64.70%	2,589	35.30%	2,156	29.40%	7,334	-11.76%
Monterey	Monterey	8,285	69.53%	3,631	30.47%	4,654	39.06%	11,916	-5.76%
Pacific Grove	Monterey	5,667	69.31%	2,509	30.69%	3,158	38.63%	8,176	-10.76%
Salinas	Monterey	22,915	60.39%	15,033	39.61%	7,882	20.77%	37,948	-29.72%
Sand City	Monterey	113	72.90%	42	27.10%	71	45.81%	155	14.40%
Seaside	Monterey	6,054	68.12%	2,833	31.88%	3,221	36.24%	8,887	-14.37%
Soledad	Monterey	2,249	60.51%	1,468	39.49%	781	21.01%	3,717	-44.78%
Unincorporated Area	Monterey	27,549	61.07%	17,559	38.93%	9,990	22.15%	45,108	-2.04%
American Canyon	Napa	4,202	56.36%	3,253	43.64%	949	12.73%	7,455	-36.10%
Calistoga	Napa	1,213	63.05%	711	36.95%	502	26.09%	1,924	-25.30%
Napa	Napa	21,005	62.46%	12,622	37.54%	8,383	24.93%	33,627	-12.23%
St. Helena	Napa	1,762	63.77%	1,001	36.23%	761	27.54%	2,763	-19.74%
Yountville	Napa	976	63.46%	562	36.54%	414	26.92%	1,538	-9.51%
Unincorporated Area	Napa	7,573	59.36%	5,184	40.64%	2,389	18.73%	12,757	-1.34%
Grass Valley	Nevada	3,590	54.91%	2,948	45.09%	642	9.82%	6,538	-0.49%
Nevada City	Nevada	1,290	64.99%	695	35.01%	595	29.97%	1,985	-14.26%
Truckee	Nevada	5,299	66.72%	2,643	33.28%	2,656	33.44%	7,942	-7.05%
Unincorporated Area	Nevada	19,163	49.19%	19,797	50.81%	-634	-1.63%	38,960	3.55%
Aliso Viejo	Orange	12,198	57.51%	9,012	42.49%	3,186	15.02%	21,210	4.27%
Anaheim	Orange	52,368	51.35%	49,613	48.65%	2,755	2.70%	101,981	-20.01%
Brea	Orange	9,409	47.78%	10,282	52.22%	-873	-4.43%	19,691	-0.77%
Buena Park	Orange	13,113	50.23%	12,992	49.77%	121	0.46%	26,105	-19.46%
Costa Mesa	Orange	24,688	58.98%	17,170	41.02%	7,518	17.96%	41,858	7.65%
Cypress	Orange	9,798	48.06%	10,590	51.94%	-792	-3.88%	20,388	-10.15%
Dana Point	Orange	9,849	55.93%	7,760	44.07%	2,089	11.86%	17,609	20.18%
Fountain Valley	Orange	12,223	47.86%	13,314	52.14%	-1,091	-4.27%	25,537	-4.58%
Fullerton	Orange	26,425	51.47%	24,919	48.53%	1,506	2.93%	51,344	-11.68%
Garden Grove	Orange	24,817	49.06%	25,766	50.94%	-949	-1.88%	50,583	-24.85%
Huntington Beach	Orange	52,144	55.25%	42,234	44.75%	9,910	10.50%	94,378	16.92%
Irvine	Orange	50,281	55.37%	40,531	44.63%	9,750	10.74%	90,812	-18.80%
La Habra	Orange	10,162	50.11%	10,119	49.89%	43	0.21%	20,281	-13.78%
La Palma	Orange	2,741	42.97%	3,638	57.03%	-897	-14.06%	6,379	-27.14%
Laguna Beach	Orange	8,583	61.53%	5,366	38.47%	3,217	23.06%	13,949	-2.94%
Laguna Hills	Orange	7,728	53.57%	6,697	46.43%	1,031	7.15%	14,425	8.52%
Laguna Niguel	Orange	17,477	53.71%	15,065	46.29%	2,412	7.41%	32,542	9.14%
Laguna Woods	Orange	5,516	48.63%	5,826	51.37%	-310	-2.73%	11,342	-9.32%
Lake Forest	Orange	18,810	53.37%	16,434	46.63%	2,376	6.74%	35,244	7.51%
Los Alamitos	Orange	2,756	54.32%	2,318	45.68%	438	8.63%	5,074	6.59%
Mission Viejo	Orange	24,400	50.57%	23,847	49.43%	553	1.15%	48,247	7.18%
Newport Beach	Orange	24,123	53.02%	21,374	46.98%	2,749	6.04%	45,497	20.23%
Orange	Orange	28,630	52.48%	25,919	47.52%	2,711	4.97%	54,549	2.26%
Placentia	Orange	10,026	47.16%	11,235	52.84%	-1,209	-5.69%	21,261	-5.75%
Rancho Santa Margarita	Orange	11,672	51.94%	10,801	48.06%	871	3.88%	22,473	11.44%
San Clemente	Orange	17,119	53.22%	15,049	46.78%	2,070	6.43%	32,168	20.98%
San Juan Capistrano	Orange	8,242	52.06%	7,591	47.94%	651	4.11%	15,833	13.85%
Santa Ana	Orange	37,770	52.22%	34,561	47.78%	3,209	4.44%	72,331	-48.39%
Seal Beach	Orange	7,602	51.55%	7,144	48.45%	458	3.11%	14,746	2.65%
Stanton	Orange	5,077	51.64%	4,754	48.36%	323	3.29%	9,831	-28.95%
Tustin	Orange	14,040	52.57%	12,669	47.43%	1,371	5.13%	26,709	-15.46%
Villa Park	Orange	1,499	42.40%	2,036	57.60%	-537	-15.19%	3,535	16.37%
Westminster	Orange	13,991	47.27%	15,608	52.73%	-1,617	-5.46%	29,599	-20.95%
Yorba Linda	Orange	15,432	44.01%	19,635	55.99%	-4,203	-11.99%	35,067	12.22%
Unincorporated Area	Orange	28,992	49.33%	29,777	50.67%	-785	-1.34%	58,769	7.84%
Auburn	Placer	3,841	52.06%	3,537	47.94%	304	4.12%	7,378	1.67%
Colfax	Placer	462	57.46%	342	42.54%	120	14.93%	804	32.07%
Lincoln	Placer	10,670	45.01%	13,036	54.99%	-2,366	-9.98%	23,706	6.02%
Loomis	Placer	1,697	46.84%	1,926	53.16%	-229	-6.32%	3,623	24.00%
Rocklin	Placer	13,773	47.31%	15,340	52.69%	-1,567	-5.38%	29,113	5.44%
Roseville	Placer	29,711	48.53%	31,515	51.47%	-1,804	-2.95%	61,226	3.93%
Unincorporated Area	Placer	29,179	48.87%	30,532	51.13%	-1,353	-2.27%	59,711	14.49%
Portola	Plumas	472	61.30%	298	38.70%	174	22.60%	770	37.80%
Unincorporated Area	Plumas	4,629	51.43%	4,371	48.57%	258	2.87%	9,000	23.97%
Banning	Riverside	4,815	48.02%	5,213	51.98%	-398	-3.97%	10,028	-1.01%
Beaumont	Riverside	7,837	50.39%	7,716	49.61%	121	0.78%	15,553	7.28%
Blythe	Riverside	1,594	52.54%	1,440	47.46%	154	5.08%	3,034	7.80%
Calimesa	Riverside	1,732	46.96%	1,956	53.04%	-224	-6.07%	3,688	25.64%
Canyon Lake	Riverside	2,778	53.29%	2,435	46.71%	343	6.58%	5,213	59.66%
Cathedral City	Riverside	9,144	61.49%	5,726	38.51%	3,418	22.99%	14,870	-15.19%
Coachella	Riverside	4,126	55.38%	3,324	44.62%	802	10.77%	7,450	-64.61%
Corona	Riverside	25,824	50.35%	25,470	49.65%	354	0.69%	51,294	-2.59%
Desert Hot Springs	Riverside	4,236	64.23%	2,359	35.77%	1,877	28.46%	6,595	0.28%
Eastvale	Riverside	9,185	49.19%	9,487	50.81%	-302	-1.62%	18,672	-16.83%
Hemet	Riverside	13,243	50.39%	13,037	49.61%	206	0.78%	26,280	9.65%
Indian Wells	Riverside	1,142	47.88%	1,243	52.12%	-101	-4.23%	2,385	30.14%
Indio	Riverside	12,711	54.55%	10,590	45.45%	2,121	9.10%	23,301	-13.30%
Jurupa Valley	Riverside	13,092	51.45%	12,355	48.55%	737	2.90%	25,447	-17.64%
La Quinta	Riverside	8,554	53.48%	7,442	46.52%	1,112	6.95%	15,996	13.61%
Lake Elsinore	Riverside	9,621	56.00%	7,560	44.00%	2,061	12.00%	17,181	14.19%
Menifee	Riverside	16,825	49.83%	16,941	50.17%	-116	-0.34%	33,766	17.62%
Moreno Valley	Riverside	30,183	55.66%	24,043	44.34%	6,140	11.32%	54,226	-28.82%
Murrieta	Riverside	19,355	49.74%	19,559	50.26%	-204	-0.52%	38,914	20.61%
Norco	Riverside	4,542	47.89%	4,943	52.11%	-401	-4.23%	9,485	32.16%
Palm Desert	Riverside	11,191	54.18%	9,464	45.82%	1,727	8.36%	20,655	10.36%
Palm Springs	Riverside	13,950	70.82%	5,747	29.18%	8,203	41.65%	19,697	-5.68%
Perris	Riverside	9,183	56.30%	7,129	43.70%	2,054	12.59%	16,312	-43.54%
Rancho Mirage	Riverside	4,575	55.25%	3,706	44.75%	869	10.49%	8,281	7.70%
Riverside	Riverside	51,584	53.65%	44,568	46.35%	7,016	7.30%	96,152	-11.92%
San Jacinto	Riverside	6,280	52.66%	5,645	47.34%	635	5.32%	11,925	-5.66%
Temecula	Riverside	20,687	51.48%	19,498	48.52%	1,189	2.96%	40,185	20.45%
Wildomar	Riverside	6,508	52.91%	5,793	47.09%	715	5.81%	12,301	28.36%
Unincorporated Area	Riverside	59,521	50.99%	57,220	49.01%	2,301	1.97%	116,741	11.44%
Citrus Heights	Sacramento	17,246	51.56%	16,205	48.44%	1,041	3.11%	33,451	11.55%
Elk Grove	Sacramento	32,858	49.98%	32,886	50.02%	-28	-0.04%	65,744	-27.24%
Folsom	Sacramento	15,714	47.64%	17,271	52.36%	-1,557	-4.72%	32,985	-5.22%
Galt	Sacramento	4,139	48.23%	4,442	51.77%	-303	-3.53%	8,581	4.15%
Isleton	Sacramento	168	65.37%	89	34.63%	79	30.74%	257	12.70%
Rancho Cordova	Sacramento	13,469	54.78%	11,117	45.22%	2,352	9.57%	24,586	-6.10%
Sacramento	Sacramento	104,854	60.90%	67,327	39.10%	37,527	21.80%	172,181	-32.02%
Unincorporated Area	Sacramento	112,037	51.80%	104,234	48.20%	7,803	3.61%	216,271	-7.99%
Hollister	San Benito	7,105	56.94%	5,374	43.06%	1,731	13.87%	12,479	-21.40%
San Juan Bautista	San Benito	532	66.58%	267	33.42%	265	33.17%	799	-7.09%
Unincorporated Area	San Benito	4,476	52.27%	4,088	47.73%	388	4.53%	8,564	4.68%
Adelanto	San Bernardino	3,745	60.44%	2,451	39.56%	1,294	20.88%	6,196	-20.01%
Apple Valley	San Bernardino	13,857	50.54%	13,561	49.46%	296	1.08%	27,418	30.67%
Barstow	San Bernardino	3,105	55.61%	2,479	44.39%	626	11.21%	5,584	13.77%
Big Bear Lake	San Bernardino	1,175	53.73%	1,012	46.27%	163	7.45%	2,187	36.19%
Chino	San Bernardino	13,091	49.25%	13,490	50.75%	-399	-1.50%	26,581	-12.99%
Chino Hills	San Bernardino	14,178	47.29%	15,801	52.71%	-1,623	-5.41%	29,979	-9.85%
Colton	San Bernardino	7,362	55.34%	5,941	44.66%	1,421	10.68%	13,303	-33.61%
Fontana	San Bernardino	29,178	53.52%	25,337	46.48%	3,841	7.05%	54,515	-35.70%
Grand Terrace	San Bernardino	2,581	52.40%	2,345	47.60%	236	4.79%	4,926	2.80%
Hesperia	San Bernardino	14,371	53.83%	12,325	46.17%	2,046	7.66%	26,696	21.49%
Highland	San Bernardino	8,526	50.86%	8,237	49.14%	289	1.72%	16,763	-9.74%
Loma Linda	San Bernardino	3,598	46.95%	4,065	53.05%	-467	-6.09%	7,663	-21.37%
Montclair	San Bernardino	5,094	53.09%	4,501	46.91%	593	6.18%	9,595	-38.60%
Needles	San Bernardino	792	60.92%	508	39.08%	284	21.85%	1,300	44.38%
Ontario	San Bernardino	23,580	53.33%	20,639	46.67%	2,941	6.65%	44,219	-28.52%
Rancho Cucamonga	San Bernardino	34,014	50.47%	33,377	49.53%	637	0.95%	67,391	-3.05%
Redlands	San Bernardino	15,571	51.38%	14,735	48.62%	836	2.76%	30,306	-2.04%
Rialto	San Bernardino	14,830	56.27%	11,524	43.73%	3,306	12.54%	26,354	-39.33%
San Bernardino	San Bernardino	28,031	55.75%	22,246	44.25%	5,785	11.51%	50,277	-27.11%
Twentynine Palms	San Bernardino	2,553	60.06%	1,698	39.94%	855	20.11%	4,251	38.28%
Upland	San Bernardino	14,452	47.06%	16,255	52.94%	-1,803	-5.87%	30,707	-11.69%
Victorville	San Bernardino	17,334	56.18%	13,522	43.82%	3,812	12.35%	30,856	-5.34%
Yucaipa	San Bernardino	10,393	47.95%	11,281	52.05%	-888	-4.10%	21,674	26.18%
Yucca Valley	San Bernardino	4,354	55.10%	3,548	44.90%	806	10.20%	7,902	40.22%
Unincorporated Area	San Bernardino	50,971	54.04%	43,345	45.96%	7,626	8.09%	94,316	21.32%
Carlsbad	San Diego	34,117	56.94%	25,798	43.06%	8,319	13.88%	59,915	3.43%
Chula Vista	San Diego	50,607	51.55%	47,565	48.45%	3,042	3.10%	98,172	-34.35%
Coronado	San Diego	4,548	50.86%	4,395	49.14%	153	1.71%	8,943	3.87%
Del Mar	San Diego	1,774	64.91%	959	35.09%	815	29.82%	2,733	0.36%
El Cajon	San Diego	15,817	51.69%	14,781	48.31%	1,036	3.39%	30,598	6.95%
Encinitas	San Diego	22,668	65.23%	12,082	34.77%	10,586	30.46%	34,750	-0.89%
Escondido	San Diego	25,333	52.09%	23,302	47.91%	2,031	4.18%	48,635	-1.00%
Imperial Beach	San Diego	5,474	62.04%	3,350	37.96%	2,124	24.07%	8,824	1.81%
La Mesa	San Diego	15,810	59.11%	10,939	40.89%	4,871	18.21%	26,749	-3.40%
Lemon Grove	San Diego	5,601	56.52%	4,308	43.48%	1,293	13.05%	9,909	-17.06%
National City	San Diego	7,540	49.96%	7,551	50.04%	-11	-0.07%	15,091	-52.86%
Oceanside	San Diego	39,952	56.87%	30,294	43.13%	9,658	13.75%	70,246	5.46%
Poway	San Diego	12,265	49.96%	12,285	50.04%	-20	-0.08%	24,550	4.53%
San Diego	San Diego	343,690	61.56%	214,614	38.44%	129,076	23.12%	558,304	-14.74%
San Marcos	San Diego	18,455	54.53%	15,386	45.47%	3,069	9.07%	33,841	-0.29%
Santee	San Diego	13,612	52.27%	12,430	47.73%	1,182	4.54%	26,042	23.73%
Solana Beach	San Diego	4,561	61.23%	2,888	38.77%	1,673	22.46%	7,449	-2.85%
Vista	San Diego	18,152	56.86%	13,773	43.14%	4,379	13.72%	31,925	3.55%
Unincorporated Area	San Diego	104,860	50.02%	104,778	49.98%	82	0.04%	209,638	16.22%
San Francisco	San Francisco	295,284	74.26%	102,347	25.74%	192,937	48.52%	397,631	-27.69%
Escalon	San Joaquin	1,391	46.12%	1,625	53.88%	-234	-7.76%	3,016	20.36%
Lathrop	San Joaquin	3,551	56.27%	2,760	43.73%	791	12.53%	6,311	-24.52%
Lodi	San Joaquin	10,594	47.71%	11,610	52.29%	-1,016	-4.58%	22,204	9.38%
Manteca	San Joaquin	13,589	52.47%	12,310	47.53%	1,279	4.94%	25,899	-0.17%
Ripon	San Joaquin	2,672	39.07%	4,167	60.93%	-1,495	-21.86%	6,839	17.27%
Stockton	San Joaquin	43,988	54.40%	36,877	45.60%	7,111	8.79%	80,865	-29.95%
Tracy	San Joaquin	15,841	56.26%	12,317	43.74%	3,524	12.52%	28,158	-14.10%
Unincorporated Area	San Joaquin	23,579	48.21%	25,335	51.79%	-1,756	-3.59%	48,914	4.31%
Arroyo Grande	San Luis Obispo	5,257	53.04%	4,654	46.96%	603	6.08%	9,911	3.10%
Atascadero	San Luis Obispo	8,183	55.61%	6,531	44.39%	1,652	11.23%	14,714	15.54%
El Paso de Robles	San Luis Obispo	6,602	51.53%	6,209	48.47%	393	3.07%	12,811	12.10%
Grover Beach	San Luis Obispo	3,499	62.40%	2,108	37.60%	1,391	24.81%	5,607	14.70%
Morro Bay	San Luis Obispo	3,803	62.45%	2,287	37.55%	1,516	24.89%	6,090	3.83%
Pismo Beach	San Luis Obispo	2,853	57.71%	2,091	42.29%	762	15.41%	4,944	10.88%
San Luis Obispo	San Luis Obispo	15,447	67.52%	7,431	32.48%	8,016	35.04%	22,878	-10.91%
Unincorporated Area	San Luis Obispo	32,470	55.61%	25,923	44.39%	6,547	11.21%	58,393	11.17%
Atherton	San Mateo	2,318	57.83%	1,690	42.17%	628	15.67%	4,008	-24.93%
Belmont	San Mateo	8,377	63.96%	4,721	36.04%	3,656	27.91%	13,098	-27.95%
Brisbane	San Mateo	1,523	68.95%	686	31.05%	837	37.89%	2,209	-24.36%
Burlingame	San Mateo	9,079	62.98%	5,337	37.02%	3,742	25.96%	14,416	-29.90%
Colma	San Mateo	298	58.66%	210	41.34%	88	17.32%	508	-53.60%
Daly City	San Mateo	17,742	56.26%	13,792	43.74%	3,950	12.53%	31,534	-51.87%
East Palo Alto	San Mateo	4,410	66.63%	2,209	33.37%	2,201	33.25%	6,619	-49.58%
Foster City	San Mateo	7,610	59.32%	5,219	40.68%	2,391	18.64%	12,829	-32.88%
Half Moon Bay	San Mateo	3,966	67.33%	1,924	32.67%	2,042	34.67%	5,890	-16.32%
Hillsborough	San Mateo	3,269	54.04%	2,780	45.96%	489	8.08%	6,049	-24.23%
Menlo Park	San Mateo	10,433	66.67%	5,215	33.33%	5,218	33.35%	15,648	-36.27%
Millbrae	San Mateo	5,190	55.46%	4,168	44.54%	1,022	10.92%	9,358	-34.00%
Pacifica	San Mateo	13,304	67.41%	6,431	32.59%	6,873	34.83%	19,735	-20.65%
Portola Valley	San Mateo	1,905	65.51%	1,003	34.49%	902	31.02%	2,908	-28.27%
Redwood City	San Mateo	21,805	66.23%	11,119	33.77%	10,686	32.46%	32,924	-27.42%
San Bruno	San Mateo	10,274	60.35%	6,750	39.65%	3,524	20.70%	17,024	-32.40%
San Carlos	San Mateo	10,771	64.98%	5,806	35.02%	4,965	29.95%	16,577	-26.90%
San Mateo	San Mateo	27,573	64.09%	15,447	35.91%	12,126	28.19%	43,020	-29.03%
South San Francisco	San Mateo	13,543	57.84%	9,872	42.16%	3,671	15.68%	23,415	-44.79%
Woodside	San Mateo	2,234	65.32%	1,186	34.68%	1,048	30.64%	3,420	-12.97%
Unincorporated Area	San Mateo	20,041	67.79%	9,523	32.21%	10,518	35.58%	29,564	-22.60%
Buellton	Santa Barbara	1,346	56.20%	1,049	43.80%	297	12.40%	2,395	10.67%
Carpinteria	Santa Barbara	3,837	63.70%	2,187	36.30%	1,650	27.39%	6,024	-14.40%
Goleta	Santa Barbara	9,123	62.33%	5,513	37.67%	3,610	24.67%	14,636	-15.63%
Guadalupe	Santa Barbara	885	54.03%	753	45.97%	132	8.06%	1,638	-43.34%
Lompoc	Santa Barbara	7,411	57.66%	5,442	42.34%	1,969	15.32%	12,853	4.37%
Santa Barbara	Santa Barbara	29,523	71.30%	11,884	28.70%	17,639	42.60%	41,407	-13.31%
Santa Maria	Santa Barbara	11,940	50.82%	11,556	49.18%	384	1.63%	23,496	-15.55%
Solvang	Santa Barbara	1,504	51.37%	1,424	48.63%	80	2.73%	2,928	3.94%
Unincorporated Area	Santa Barbara	42,659	60.45%	27,907	39.55%	14,752	20.91%	70,566	2.24%
Campbell	Santa Clara	12,042	62.78%	7,139	37.22%	4,903	25.56%	19,181	-22.78%
Cupertino	Santa Clara	12,020	50.50%	11,784	49.50%	236	0.99%	23,804	-53.54%
Gilroy	Santa Clara	10,759	56.78%	8,191	43.22%	2,568	13.55%	18,950	-23.52%
Los Altos	Santa Clara	10,136	58.56%	7,172	41.44%	2,964	17.13%	17,308	-39.18%
Los Altos Hills	Santa Clara	2,931	58.54%	2,076	41.46%	855	17.08%	5,007	-27.15%
Los Gatos	Santa Clara	10,421	61.95%	6,401	38.05%	4,020	23.90%	16,822	-20.21%
Milpitas	Santa Clara	11,440	51.24%	10,888	48.76%	552	2.47%	22,328	-49.70%
Monte Sereno	Santa Clara	1,250	58.47%	888	41.53%	362	16.93%	2,138	-19.81%
Morgan Hill	Santa Clara	10,681	57.37%	7,938	42.63%	2,743	14.73%	18,619	-13.21%
Mountain View	Santa Clara	20,961	67.66%	10,020	32.34%	10,941	35.32%	30,981	-31.78%
Palo Alto	Santa Clara	22,181	65.90%	11,478	34.10%	10,703	31.80%	33,659	-38.48%
San Jose	Santa Clara	198,379	57.10%	149,050	42.90%	49,329	14.20%	347,429	-39.11%
Santa Clara	Santa Clara	23,877	58.99%	16,596	41.01%	7,281	17.99%	40,473	-34.79%
Saratoga	Santa Clara	8,990	53.01%	7,970	46.99%	1,020	6.01%	16,960	-36.96%
Sunnyvale	Santa Clara	29,257	59.46%	19,947	40.54%	9,310	18.92%	49,204	-37.80%
Unincorporated Area	Santa Clara	21,060	61.39%	13,248	38.61%	7,812	22.77%	34,308	-17.74%
Capitola	Santa Cruz	3,765	72.00%	1,464	28.00%	2,301	44.00%	5,229	-10.91%
Santa Cruz	Santa Cruz	24,126	76.81%	7,286	23.19%	16,840	53.61%	31,412	-19.01%
Scotts Valley	Santa Cruz	4,150	62.06%	2,537	37.94%	1,613	24.12%	6,687	-12.53%
Watsonville	Santa Cruz	8,192	62.52%	4,910	37.48%	3,282	25.05%	13,102	-42.79%
Unincorporated Area	Santa Cruz	49,020	68.78%	22,253	31.22%	26,767	37.56%	71,273	-12.97%
Anderson	Shasta	1,935	54.88%	1,591	45.12%	344	9.76%	3,526	48.40%
Redding	Shasta	18,940	48.48%	20,128	51.52%	-1,188	-3.04%	39,068	28.49%
Shasta Lake	Shasta	2,196	54.25%	1,852	45.75%	344	8.50%	4,048	43.16%
Unincorporated Area	Shasta	15,579	47.23%	17,407	52.77%	-1,828	-5.54%	32,986	38.74%
Loyalton	Sierra	177	50.00%	177	50.00%	0	0.00%	354	27.86%
Unincorporated Area	Sierra	764	51.24%	727	48.76%	37	2.48%	1,491	26.54%
Dorris	Siskiyou	116	45.31%	140	54.69%	-24	-9.37%	256	25.37%
Dunsmuir	Siskiyou	449	63.06%	263	36.94%	186	26.12%	712	13.66%
Etna	Siskiyou	152	46.20%	177	53.80%	-25	-7.60%	329	21.74%
Fort Jones	Siskiyou	136	46.42%	157	53.58%	-21	-7.17%	293	24.37%
Montague	Siskiyou	277	49.29%	285	50.71%	-8	-1.42%	562	45.40%
Mt. Shasta	Siskiyou	1,013	62.19%	616	37.81%	397	24.37%	1,629	0.66%
Tulelake	Siskiyou	80	42.11%	110	57.89%	-30	-15.79%	190	22.59%
Weed	Siskiyou	488	61.15%	310	38.85%	178	22.31%	798	19.54%
Yreka	Siskiyou	1,543	50.11%	1,536	49.89%	7	0.23%	3,079	28.16%
Unincorporated Area	Siskiyou	6,414	50.30%	6,338	49.70%	76	0.60%	12,752	25.86%
Benicia	Solano	9,559	62.73%	5,680	37.27%	3,879	25.45%	15,239	-12.97%
Dixon	Solano	3,874	52.29%	3,534	47.71%	340	4.59%	7,408	-0.73%
Fairfield	Solano	22,088	57.44%	16,366	42.56%	5,722	14.88%	38,454	-19.25%
Rio Vista	Solano	2,820	56.92%	2,134	43.08%	686	13.85%	4,954	3.14%
Suisun City	Solano	5,956	60.28%	3,924	39.72%	2,032	20.57%	9,880	-20.50%
Vacaville	Solano	20,047	54.51%	16,731	45.49%	3,316	9.02%	36,778	3.57%
Vallejo	Solano	27,256	63.12%	15,928	36.88%	11,328	26.23%	43,184	-31.96%
Unincorporated Area	Solano	4,657	51.99%	4,300	48.01%	357	3.99%	8,957	12.06%
Cloverdale	Sonoma	2,231	58.17%	1,604	41.83%	627	16.35%	3,835	-18.14%
Cotati	Sonoma	2,315	63.29%	1,343	36.71%	972	26.57%	3,658	-19.18%
Healdsburg	Sonoma	3,476	59.67%	2,349	40.33%	1,127	19.35%	5,825	-34.17%
Petaluma	Sonoma	18,719	62.26%	11,347	37.74%	7,372	24.52%	30,066	-26.30%
Rohnert Park	Sonoma	10,557	60.52%	6,888	39.48%	3,669	21.03%	17,445	-20.41%
Santa Rosa	Sonoma	42,493	57.40%	31,538	42.60%	10,955	14.80%	74,031	-35.36%
Sebastopol	Sonoma	2,854	62.77%	1,693	37.23%	1,161	25.53%	4,547	-45.10%
Sonoma	Sonoma	3,832	62.36%	2,313	37.64%	1,519	24.72%	6,145	-26.36%
Windsor	Sonoma	6,879	54.94%	5,643	45.06%	1,236	9.87%	12,522	-26.35%
Unincorporated Area	Sonoma	43,002	59.10%	29,757	40.90%	13,245	18.20%	72,759	-27.58%
Ceres	Stanislaus	6,745	52.37%	6,134	47.63%	611	4.74%	12,879	-19.71%
Hughson	Stanislaus	1,086	41.14%	1,554	58.86%	-468	-17.73%	2,640	4.72%
Modesto	Stanislaus	37,686	52.80%	33,689	47.20%	3,997	5.60%	71,375	-1.97%
Newman	Stanislaus	1,594	53.71%	1,374	46.29%	220	7.41%	2,968	-8.41%
Oakdale	Stanislaus	4,110	49.43%	4,204	50.57%	-94	-1.13%	8,314	23.19%
Patterson	Stanislaus	3,447	56.45%	2,659	43.55%	788	12.91%	6,106	-22.58%
Riverbank	Stanislaus	3,609	48.99%	3,758	51.01%	-149	-2.02%	7,367	-7.48%
Turlock	Stanislaus	11,551	48.42%	12,304	51.58%	-753	-3.16%	23,855	-2.51%
Waterford	Stanislaus	1,218	47.14%	1,366	52.86%	-148	-5.73%	2,584	16.20%
Unincorporated Area	Stanislaus	15,343	45.19%	18,612	54.81%	-3,269	-9.63%	33,955	5.42%
Live Oak	Sutter	1,109	49.40%	1,136	50.60%	-27	-1.20%	2,245	-13.33%
Yuba City	Sutter	10,191	47.07%	11,462	52.93%	-1,271	-5.87%	21,653	1.43%
Unincorporated Area	Sutter	3,654	41.04%	5,249	58.96%	-1,595	-17.92%	8,903	24.47%
Corning	Tehama	1,014	53.76%	872	46.24%	142	7.53%	1,886	22.25%
Red Bluff	Tehama	2,288	52.42%	2,077	47.58%	211	4.83%	4,365	29.33%
Tehama	Tehama	91	53.22%	80	46.78%	11	6.43%	171	32.29%
Unincorporated Area	Tehama	8,102	46.93%	9,163	53.07%	-1,061	-6.15%	17,265	36.16%
Unincorporated Area	Trinity	2,880	50.05%	2,874	49.95%	6	0.10%	5,754	10.81%
Dinuba	Tulare	1,986	45.15%	2,413	54.85%	-427	-9.71%	4,399	-35.62%
Exeter	Tulare	1,477	45.27%	1,786	54.73%	-309	-9.47%	3,263	21.99%
Farmersville	Tulare	847	51.49%	798	48.51%	49	2.98%	1,645	-34.64%
Lindsay	Tulare	938	50.16%	932	49.84%	6	0.32%	1,870	-45.45%
Porterville	Tulare	5,774	46.83%	6,556	53.17%	-782	-6.34%	12,330	-7.93%
Tulare	Tulare	7,075	46.12%	8,267	53.88%	-1,192	-7.77%	15,342	3.30%
Visalia	Tulare	19,211	46.14%	22,428	53.86%	-3,217	-7.73%	41,639	7.40%
Woodlake	Tulare	651	51.96%	602	48.04%	49	3.91%	1,253	-40.23%
Unincorporated Area	Tulare	12,572	41.15%	17,978	58.85%	-5,406	-17.70%	30,550	-0.87%
Sonora	Tuolumne	907	56.34%	703	43.66%	204	12.67%	1,610	17.20%
Unincorporated Area	Tuolumne	12,554	52.02%	11,580	47.98%	974	4.04%	24,134	26.68%
Camarillo	Ventura	17,278	51.25%	16,436	48.75%	842	2.50%	33,714	-1.95%
Fillmore	Ventura	2,466	49.92%	2,474	50.08%	-8	-0.16%	4,940	-28.91%
Moorpark	Ventura	8,958	53.25%	7,864	46.75%	1,094	6.50%	16,822	-1.72%
Ojai	Ventura	2,726	65.70%	1,423	34.30%	1,303	31.41%	4,149	-6.76%
Oxnard	Ventura	32,111	56.58%	24,645	43.42%	7,466	13.15%	56,756	-36.86%
Port Hueneme	Ventura	4,232	60.53%	2,760	39.47%	1,472	21.05%	6,992	-14.10%
San Buenaventura	Ventura	31,288	60.07%	20,795	39.93%	10,493	20.15%	52,083	-3.55%
Santa Paula	Ventura	4,831	52.87%	4,307	47.13%	524	5.73%	9,138	-34.56%
Simi Valley	Ventura	30,479	52.85%	27,193	47.15%	3,286	5.70%	57,672	9.81%
Thousand Oaks	Ventura	35,058	54.06%	29,789	45.94%	5,269	8.13%	64,847	-1.62%
Unincorporated Area	Ventura	25,491	58.32%	18,216	41.68%	7,275	16.64%	43,707	4.00%
Davis	Yolo	21,659	68.85%	9,801	31.15%	11,858	37.69%	31,460	-32.24%
West Sacramento	Yolo	10,189	57.73%	7,459	42.27%	2,730	15.47%	17,648	-13.81%
Winters	Yolo	1,524	58.28%	1,091	41.72%	433	16.56%	2,615	-6.40%
Woodland	Yolo	11,275	53.87%	9,656	46.13%	1,619	7.73%	20,931	-16.99%
Unincorporated Area	Yolo	4,977	52.81%	4,448	47.19%	529	5.61%	9,425	-9.73%
Marysville	Yuba	1,666	49.44%	1,704	50.56%	-38	-1.13%	3,370	16.61%
Wheatland	Yuba	644	48.57%	682	51.43%	-38	-2.87%	1,326	32.65%
Unincorporated Area	Yuba	8,410	46.79%	9,563	53.21%	-1,153	-6.42%	17,973	16.82%
Totals		7,979,046	57.13%	5,987,024	42.87%	1,992,022	14.26%	13,966,070	-16.10%

Cities & Unincorporated Areas that voted "Yes" on Proposition 64 and for Donald Trump

- Oroville (Butte)
- Paradise (Butte)
- Crescent City (Del Norte)
- Unincorporated Area (Del Norte)
- Placerville (El Dorado)
- Coalinga (Fresno)
- Orland (Glenn)
- Unincorporated Area (Inyo)
- California City (Kern)
- Maricopa (Kern)
- Ridgecrest (Kern)
- Unincorporated Area (Mariposa)
- Alturas (Modoc)
- Unincorporated Area (Mono)
- Dana Point (Orange)
- Huntington Beach (Orange)
- Laguna Hills (Orange)
- Laguna Niguel (Orange)
- Lake Forest (Orange)
- Mission Viejo (Orange)
- Newport Beach (Orange)
- Rancho Santa Margarita (Orange)
- San Clemente (Orange)
- San Juan Capistrano (Orange)
- Colfax (Placer)
- Portola (Plumas)
- Unincorporated Area (Plumas)
- Beaumont (Riverside)
- Blythe (Riverside)
- Canyon Lake (Riverside)
- Hemet (Riverside)
- La Quinta (Riverside)
- Lake Elsinore (Riverside)
- Palm Desert (Riverside)
- Temecula (Riverside)
- Wildomar (Riverside)
- Unincorporated Area (Riverside)
- Citrus Heights (Sacramento)
- Unincorporated Area (San Benito)
- Apple Valley (San Bernardino)
- Barstow (San Bernardino)
- Big Bear Lake (San Bernardino)
- Hesperia (San Bernardino)
- Needles (San Bernardino)
- Twentynine Palms (San Bernardino)
- Yucca Valley (San Bernardino)
- Unincorporated Area (San Bernardino)
- Coronado (San Diego)
- El Cajon (San Diego)
- Santee (San Diego)
- Unincorporated Area (San Diego)
- Atascadero (San Luis Obispo)
- El Paso de Robles (San Luis Obispo)
- Solvang (Santa Barbara)
- Anderson (Shasta)
- Shasta Lake (Shasta)
- Unincorporated Area (Sierra)
- Yreka (Siskiyou)
- Unincorporated Area (Siskiyou)
- Unincorporated Area (Solano)
- Corning (Tehama)
- Red Bluff (Tehama)
- Tehama (Tehama)
- Unincorporated Area (Trinity)
- Sonora (Tuolumne)
- Unincorporated Area (Tuolumne)
- Simi Valley (Ventura)

City that tied on Proposition 64 and voted for Donald Trump

- Loyalton (Sierra)

Cities & Unincorporated Areas that voted "No" on Proposition 64 and for Hillary Clinton

- Williams (Colusa)
- Firebaugh (Fresno)
- Fowler (Fresno)
- Huron (Fresno)
- Kerman (Fresno)
- Mendota (Fresno)
- Orange Cove (Fresno)
- Reedley (Fresno)
- Sanger (Fresno)
- Selma (Fresno)
- Brawley (Imperial)
- Calexico (Imperial)
- Calipatria (Imperial)
- El Centro (Imperial)
- Holtville (Imperial)
- Imperial (Imperial)
- Westmorland (Imperial)
- Unincorporated Area (Imperial)
- Arvin (Kern)
- Delano (Kern)
- McFarland (Kern)
- Shafter (Kern)
- Wasco (Kern)
- Avenal (Kings)
- Corcoran (Kings)
- Arcadia (Los Angeles)
- Artesia (Los Angeles)
- Cerritos (Los Angeles)
- Diamond Bar (Los Angeles)
- Industry (Los Angeles)
- La Canada Flintridge (Los Angeles)
- La Mirada (Los Angeles)
- Monterey Park (Los Angeles)
- Palos Verdes Estates (Los Angeles)
- Rancho Palos Verdes (Los Angeles)
- Rolling Hills Estates (Los Angeles)
- San Dimas (Los Angeles)
- San Marino (Los Angeles)
- Temple City (Los Angeles)
- Walnut (Los Angeles)
- Madera (Madera)
- Dos Palos (Merced)
- Cypress (Orange)
- Fountain Valley (Orange)
- Garden Grove (Orange)
- La Palma (Orange)
- Laguna Woods (Orange)
- Placentia (Orange)
- Westminster (Orange)
- Eastvale (Riverside)
- Elk Grove (Sacramento)
- Folsom (Sacramento)
- Chino Hills (San Bernardino)
- Chino (San Bernardino)
- Loma Linda (San Bernardino)
- Upland (San Bernardino)
- National City (San Diego)
- Riverbank (Stanislaus)
- Live Oak (Sutter)
- Dinuba (Tulare)
- Porterville (Tulare)
- Fillmore (Ventura)

== Removal of past cannabis infractions ==
On January 31, 2018, San Francisco District Attorney George Gascón announced his department would begin to retroactively apply Proposition 64 to misdemeanor and felony marijuana convictions dating back to 1975, recalling and re-sentencing up to 4,940 felony marijuana convictions and dismissing and sealing 3,038 misdemeanors. Los Angeles and San Joaquin counties announced in April plans to automatically clear about 54,000 marijuana-related convictions. The national non-profit Code for America developed the technology and process to automate the dismissing and sealing of these records, which they first piloted with the San Francisco District Attorney's office, and subsequently extended to Los Angeles, San Joaquin, and Sacramento counties. In 2019, Code for America released an open source playbook and software that made every California county able to dismiss and seal records eligible for expungement under Prop 64 automatically, in bulk.

== See also ==
- Cannabis in California
- List of 2016 United States cannabis reform proposals
