= People v. Jovan Jackson =

Landmark California court case about marijuana cultivation

People v. Jovan Jackson, 210 Cal.App.4th 525 (2012) is a landmark decision by the Fourth Appellate District of California, which affirmed that persons that associate to collectively cultivate medical marijuana are entitled to a legal defense as provided by California Senate Bill 420 (known as the Medical Marijuana Program Act). The decision has defined medical marijuana law in the state of California.

== Overview ==
The court ruled that medical marijuana patients do not have to actively participate in the cultivation of medical marijuana, and that financial support provided by collective members through medical marijuana purchases constitute sufficient involvement in a collective. Mr. Jackson has been represented by attorney Lance Rogers and prosecuted by Deputy District Attorney Chris Lindberg three times for substantially the same offenses. Mr. Jackson stood trial for a third time in October through November 2013 where he was convicted of three marijuana related charges. His conviction will be appealed.

== 2009 trial ==
Mr. Jackson and other medical marijuana patients operated the medical marijuana collective known as Answerdam in 2008. At Mr. Jackson's first trial, the jury was instructed as to the defense for marijuana collectives and cooperatives provided by the Medical Marijuana Program Act (MMPA). The jury acquitted Mr. Jackson of five counts related to the possession and sale of marijuana but convicted him on a related drug charge. Following Mr. Jackson's first trial, the jury foreperson explained the difficulty in interpreting the MMPA defense: "[I]t was all contingent on the medical marijuana defense and the lack of definition within the state law as far as what constitutes a collective or a cooperative.... So, um, just for the lack of definition of that state law was really the key. [¶] ... [¶] Um, the prosecution gave his... kind of narrow definition during the, the closing arguments, but there was nothing in the law that really backed that up."

== 2010 trial ==
Federal and state law enforcement agencies continued to investigate Mr. Jackson and Answerdam while the first charges were pending. After Mr. Jackson's acquittal, law enforcement raided Answerdam again and charged Mr. Jackson in a new information with one count of the sale of marijuana and two counts of possession of marijuana for sale. At Mr. Jackson's second trial in 2010, the trial court denied Mr. Jackson the MMPA defense that had previously been provided to him during his 2008 trial for similar offenses. Due to his lack of the defense provided by state law, Mr. Jackson was found guilty of the charges.

== Second trial appeal ==
Mr. Jackson, assisted by his trial attorney Lance Rogers, and Joe Elford of Americans for Safe Access, appealed the second conviction, leading to the landmark decision in People v. Jovan Jackson, 210 Cal.App.4th 1371 (2012). The court affirmed a defendant's right to the legal defense provided by the MMPA. In addition, the court clarified the law in regard to the MMPA defense. The court stated the three elements of the MMPA are that the collective 1. Are qualified patients or primary caregivers; and 2. Collectively associate to cultivate marijuana; and 3. The collective must be a nonprofit enterprise. In addition, the court provided factors for a jury to consider as to whether the collective is a non-profit, specifically:

The size of the collective's membership; the volume of purchases from the collective; the members participation in the operation and governance of the collective; the testimony of the operator[s] of the collective; its formal establishment as a nonprofit organization; the presence or absence of any financial records; the presence or absence of processes by which the collective is accountable to its members; the volume of business it conducts; any other evidence of profit or loss.

Mr. Jackson's conviction from the second trial was reversed and remanded to the San Diego Superior Court.

== 2013 trial ==
Following the reversal of Mr. Jackson's convictions, the San Diego District Attorney's Office proceeded to file charges against Mr. Jackson a third time. In October through November 2013, Mr. Jackson, represented by his pro bono legal team, stood trial for a third time in regards to his involvement with Answerdam. Following a six-day trial that focused on complex accounting principles, financial records, and novel legal issues as to profit and non-profit business practices, the jury deliberated for a day before convicting Mr. Jackson.

Mr. Jackson's legal team plans to file an appeal.

== Social and Political Significance of Proceedings ==
Mr. Jackson's case has become the symbol of the prosecution of medical marijuana dispensaries and patients. Organizations have argued that his continued subjection to prosecution has demonstrated that the San Diego District Attorney's Office is engaged in a crusade against the medical marijuana laws passed by the voters and legislators of the state of California. In addition, outside organizations, most notably Terrie Best from Americans for Safe Access, have provided courtroom assistance and support to Mr. Jackson by providing daily updates to the public regarding the court's proceedings. It is the San Diego District Attorney's Office position that the guilty verdicts demonstrate that the Medical Marijuana Laws cannot be used to make profit.
