= Cannabis Policy in California (2025) =

Drug regulations in US state

California's New Cannabis Policy, effective January 1, 2025, introduced several significant changes to the state's cannabis regulations, aiming to enhance consumer experiences, streamline business operations, and address public health concerns within the framework of California's existing legal cannabis market.

== Key legislative changes ==
=== Cannabis cafes and lounges (AB 1775) ===
Assembly Bill 1775 legalized the creation of "Amsterdam-style" cannabis cafes. This legislation allows licensed cannabis dispensaries and lounges to prepare and serve non-psychoactive food and beverages and to host live entertainment. This law intends to stimulate legal cannabis sales and offer consumers more social avenues for cannabis consumption. However, the implementation of cannabis cafes is subject to local control, with jurisdictions having the authority to regulate or prohibit them. As of early 2025, some cities like West Hollywood and Coachella have embraced these establishments, while others, such as San Francisco, have yet to permit them due to ongoing local regulatory processes.

=== Entertainment zones for alcohol and cannabis (SB 969) ===
Senate Bill 969 authorized local governments to designate "entertainment zones" where licensed bars and restaurants can sell alcoholic beverages for consumption on public streets and sidewalks. This initiative aims to revitalize downtown areas and increase pedestrian traffic. The bill has faced opposition from organizations raising concerns about potential increases in drunk driving and alcohol-related harm.

=== Regulatory reforms by the Department of Cannabis Control ===
The California Department of Cannabis Control (DCC) implemented a series of regulatory reforms aimed at simplifying cannabis administration and strengthening consumer protections. These reforms focused on eliminating unnecessary regulations and enhancing transparency and accountability within the state's cannabis market.

== Excise tax adjustment and licensing fees ==
In response to declining tax revenues from cannabis sales, the state announced plans to increase the cannabis excise tax rate from 15% to 19%. Additionally, the state is considering raising licensing fees for cannabis businesses. These proposed increases have generated concern among industry leaders, who fear that they could incentivize businesses to operate in the illicit market, potentially leading to significant challenges for the legal cannabis industry. Some have even warned of a potential "extinction event" for legal cannabis businesses if these tax and fee increases are implemented.

=== Social equity program extension ===
In Los Angeles, the exclusivity period for the social equity program, which provides opportunities for individuals from communities disproportionately affected by past cannabis enforcement, has been extended. This extension applies to retail, delivery, and cultivation licenses and will now run until December 31, 2025, giving social equity applicants more time to establish their businesses.

== Legal and regulatory challenges ==
Despite the advancements in cannabis policy, California's regulations continue to face legal challenges. In March 2025, the California Supreme Court upheld the state's cannabis regulations, affirming their legality despite the ongoing federal prohibition of cannabis. This decision provided a significant legal victory for the state's cannabis framework.

== Reactions ==
The introduction of these new policies has been met with both enthusiasm and concern. Supporters believe that the legalization of cannabis cafés and the creation of entertainment zones will boost the economy and provide consumers with more options. However, concerns remain regarding the potential for increased public consumption and the impact of tax increases on the legal cannabis market. The opposition to Senate Bill 969 highlights the ongoing debate about striking a balance between economic development and public safety.
