= United States v. Oakland Cannabis Buyers' Cooperative =

- Supreme Court of the United States

Argued March 28, 2001 Decided May 14, 2001
- Full case name: United States of America v. Oakland Cannabis Buyers' Cooperative
- Citations: 532 U.S. 483 (more) 121 S. Ct. 1711; 149 L. Ed. 2d 722; 2001 U.S. LEXIS 3518

Case history
- Prior: United States v. Cannabis Cultivators Club, 5 F. Supp. 2d 1086 (N.D. Cal. 1998); reversed sub. nom., United States v. Oakland Cannabis Buyers' Cooperative, 190 F.3d 1109 (9th Cir. 1999); cert. granted, 531 U.S. 1010 (2000).

Holding
- There is no medical necessity defense to a charge under the Controlled Substances Act.

Court membership
- Chief Justice William Rehnquist Associate Justices John P. Stevens · Sandra Day O'Connor; Antonin Scalia · Anthony Kennedy; David Souter · Clarence Thomas; Ruth Bader Ginsburg · Stephen Breyer

Case opinions
- Majority: Thomas, joined by Rehnquist, O'Connor, Scalia, Kennedy
- Concurrence: Stevens (in judgment), joined by Souter, Ginsburg
- Breyer took no part in the consideration or decision of the case.

Laws applied
- 21 U.S.C. § 841 et seq.

In United States v. Oakland Cannabis Buyers' Cooperative, 532 U.S. 483 (2001), the United States Supreme Court rejected the common-law medical necessity defense to crimes enacted under the federal Controlled Substances Act of 1970, regardless of their legal status under the laws of states such as California that recognize a medical use for marijuana. Oakland Cannabis Buyers' Cooperative was represented by Gerald Uelmen.

== Background ==
This case would not have arisen without the passage of Proposition 215. California's Compassionate Use Act, allowed a patient or his primary caregiver to cultivate or possess marijuana on the advice of a physician. Bolstered by the enactment, certain groups organized to supply marijuana patients in a manner consistent with the Act. The Oakland Cannabis Buyers' Cooperative is one such group.

In January 1998, the U.S. Government sued the OCBC to stop the cultivation and distribution of marijuana in violation of federal law. The Government based its argument on the provisions of the Controlled Substances Act, which forbade the distribution, manufacture, and possession with intent to distribute or manufacture a controlled substance (including marijuana). The lawsuit began in the U.S. District Court for the Northern District of California, and came before District Judge Charles R. Breyer. He concluded that the government would likely prevail on the merits and issued the injunction.

The OCBC believed, however, that ceasing the distribution of marijuana to patients would be harmful to it and so violated Judge Breyer's injunction. The Government brought contempt proceedings against the OCBC. The OCBC argued that the distributions were medically necessary. Judge Breyer found OCBC in contempt, denied OCBC's request to authorize medically necessary distributions of marijuana, and authorized the U.S. Marshals to seize OCBC's premises. Then, the OCBC agreed to stop distributing marijuana. It also appealed Judge Breyer's decision to the Ninth Circuit.

The Ninth Circuit reversed and held that medical necessity was a legally cognizable defense to charges under the Controlled Substances Act. Accordingly, the district court could have fashioned an injunction that was more limited in scope than a total ban on distributing marijuana. The Ninth Circuit ordered the district court to consider the criteria by which OCBC could distribute marijuana under the rubric of medical necessity. The government then asked the U.S. Supreme Court to review the case, and the Court granted certiorari.

When the case came before the Court, Justice Stephen Breyer recused himself from deciding the case because his brother Charles had been the district judge in the case.

== Decision ==
Justice Thomas wrote for the majority. The OCBC contended that the Controlled Substances Act was susceptible of a medical necessity exception to the ban on distribution and manufacture of marijuana. The Court concluded otherwise.

In 1812, the Court had held in United States v. Hudson and Goodwin that there were no common-law crimes in federal law. The law thus required Congress, rather than the federal courts, to define federal crimes. The Controlled Substances Act did not recognize a medical necessity exception.

Thus, "a medical necessity exception for marijuana is at odds with the terms of the Controlled Substances Act." When it passed the Controlled Substances Act, Congress made a value judgment that marijuana had "no currently accepted medical use." It was not the province of the Court to usurp the value judgment made by the legislature. Thus, it was wrong for the Ninth Circuit to hold that the Controlled Substances Act contained a medical necessity defense. It was also wrong for the Ninth Circuit to order the district court to fashion a more limited injunction that would take into account the fact that marijuana was necessary for certain people to obtain relief from symptoms of chronic illnesses.

== Subsequent history ==
The Court expressly noted that it did not decide another important issue of federal law: whether federal law could override a California law that allowed the purely-local cultivation and distribution of marijuana. It ordered the Ninth Circuit to address that argument in the first instance, and the Ninth Circuit in turn asked the district court to do so.

After further proceedings in the district court, the OCBC appealed to the Ninth Circuit again. The Ninth Circuit stayed its decision pending the Supreme Court's decision in Gonzales v. Raich, which was issued in June 2005. The Ninth Circuit remanded the case to the district court, which rejected the claim, and OCBC appealed again to the Ninth Circuit. The Ninth Circuit stayed the proceedings in this case. The stay expired October 16, 2006.

Since the decision in this case and the US Congress's passage of the Rohrabacher–Farr amendment, allowing state medical cannabis programs, the OCBC has gone on to become the largest distributor of medical marijuana ID cards in California. Currently, over 100,000 patients throughout the state are registered members of the OCBC's ID program.

== See also ==
- List of United States Supreme Court cases, volume 532
- List of United States Supreme Court cases
