= 2010 California Proposition 19 =

Failed measure to legalize marijuana

Proposition 19
- Legalize Marijuana in CA, Regulate and Tax

Results
Choice	Votes	%
Yes	4,643,592	46.54%
No	5,333,230	53.46%
Valid votes	9,976,822	100.00%
Invalid or blank votes	0	0.00%
Total votes	9,976,822	100.00%
Registered voters/turnout	17,285,883	57.72%
- County results No: 50–60% 60–70% Yes: 50–60% 60–70%

California Proposition 19 (also known as the Regulate, Control & Tax Cannabis Act) was a ballot initiative on the November 2, 2010, statewide ballot. It was defeated, with 53.5% of California voters voting "No" and 46.5% voting "Yes." If passed, it would have legalized various marijuana-related activities, allowed local governments to regulate these activities, permitted local governments to impose and collect marijuana-related fees and taxes, and authorized various criminal and civil penalties. In March 2010, it qualified to be on the November statewide ballot. The proposition required a simple majority in order to pass, and would have taken effect the day after the election. Yes on 19 was the official advocacy group for the initiative and California Public Safety Institute: No On Proposition 19 was the official opposition group.

A similar initiative, "The Tax, Regulate, and Control Cannabis Act of 2010" (California Cannabis Initiative, CCI) was filed first and received by the Attorney General's Office July 15, 2010, assigned 09-0022 that would have legalized cannabis for adults 21 and older and included provisions to decriminalize industrial hemp, retroactive expunging of criminal records and release of non violent cannabis prisoners. It did not make it onto the ballot.

Supporters of Proposition 19 argued that it would help with California's budget shortfall, would cut off a source of funding to violent drug cartels, and would redirect law enforcement resources to more dangerous crimes, while opponents claimed that it contains gaps and flaws that may have serious unintended consequences on public safety, workplaces, and federal funding. Even if the proposition had passed, the sale of cannabis would have remained illegal under federal law via the Controlled Substances Act.

Proposition 19 was followed up by the Adult Use of Marijuana Act in 2016, which successfully passed a ballot initiative with 57% of the vote.

== Effects of the bill ==
According to the State of California's Legislative Analyst's Office, the law would have had the following effects.

=== Legalization of personal cannabis-related activities ===
Except as permitted under Proposition 215 and SB 420 laws, persons age 21 and older may:

- possess up to 28.5 grams (1 oz) of cannabis for personal consumption.
- use cannabis in:
  - a non-public place such as a residence
  - a public establishment licensed for on site cannabis consumption.
- grow cannabis at a private residence in a space of up to 25 square feet (2.3 m^{2}) for personal use.

=== Local government regulation of commercial production and sale ===
Local governments may:

- Authorize the retail sale of up to 28.5 grams of cannabis per transaction to persons 21 and older.
- Regulate the location, size, hours of operation, and signs and displays of the establishments authorized to make these sales.
- Authorize larger amounts of cannabis for:
  - personal possession and cultivation, or
  - commercial cultivation, transportation, and sale.

=== Other permissions ===
- Allows for the transportation of cannabis from a licensed premises in one city or county to a licensed premises in another city or county, without regard to local laws of intermediate localities to the contrary.
- Allows the collection of taxes to allow local governments to raise revenue or to offset any costs associated with cannabis regulation.

=== Maintenance and addition of criminal and civil penalties ===
- Maintains existing laws against selling drugs to a minor and driving under the influence.
- Maintains an employer's right to address consumption of cannabis that affects an employee's job performance.
- Maintains existing laws against interstate or international transportation of cannabis.
- Every person 18 years of age or older who hires, employs, or uses a minor in transporting, carrying, selling, giving away cannabis, or knowingly sells or gives away cannabis to someone under the age of 14, shall be imprisoned in state prison for a period of three, five, or seven years.
- Every person 18 years of age or older who knowingly sells or gives away cannabis to someone older than the age of 14 but younger than 18, shall be imprisoned in the state prison for a period of three, four, or five years.
- Every person 21 years of age or older who knowingly sells or gives away cannabis to someone older than the age of 18 but younger than 21, shall be imprisoned in county jail for up to six months and fined up to $1,000 per offense.
- Any person who is licensed, permitted, or authorized to sell cannabis, who knowingly sells or gives away cannabis to someone under the age of 21, will be banned from owning, operating, or being employed by a licensed cannabis establishment for one year.

== Fiscal impact ==
The State Board of Equalization estimated that imposing a $50 per ounce levy on cannabis sales could generate $1.4 billion a year in new tax revenue, thus generating a large amount of revenue at a time when the state was experiencing financial pressure. This estimate came from the BOE's 2009 analysis of California Assembly Bill 390 based on a 2006 report entitled "Marijuana Production in the United States." These statistics were based on production estimates derived from marijuana eradication efforts from 2003 to 2005.

According to the States Legislative Analyst's office, passage of the proposition could have a significant fiscal impact, including:

- Significant savings to state and local governments; potentially up to several tens of millions of dollars annually due to reduction of individuals incarcerated, on probation, or on parole.
- Freeing up cells used to house marijuana offenders, which could be then used for other criminals, many of whom obtained early release because of a lack of jail space.
- Major reduction in state and local costs for enforcement of marijuana-related offenses and the handling of related criminal cases in the court system, providing the opportunity for funds to be used to enforce other existing criminal laws.
- Potential increase in the costs of substance abuse programs due to a projected increase in marijuana usage, possibly resulting in reduced spending on mandatory treatment for some criminal offenders, or in the redirection of these funds for other offenders.
- Potential reduction in both the costs and offsetting revenues of the state's medical marijuana program, as some adults over 21 would be less likely to participate in existing programs if obtaining marijuana were made less difficult.
- Providing the opportunity for significant additional tax revenue stream from businesses engaged in marijuana-related commerce.
- Reduction in fine collection under state law but a potential increase in local civil fines authorized by existing local laws (the cumulative effect on fines was indicated to be largely unknown).

In regard to potential savings from the reduction of incarcerated individuals, according to the California Department of Corrections and Rehabilitations, 1,639 state prison inmates were in prison for marijuana-related crimes at a cost of $85 million per year.

== Arguments ==
=== Support ===
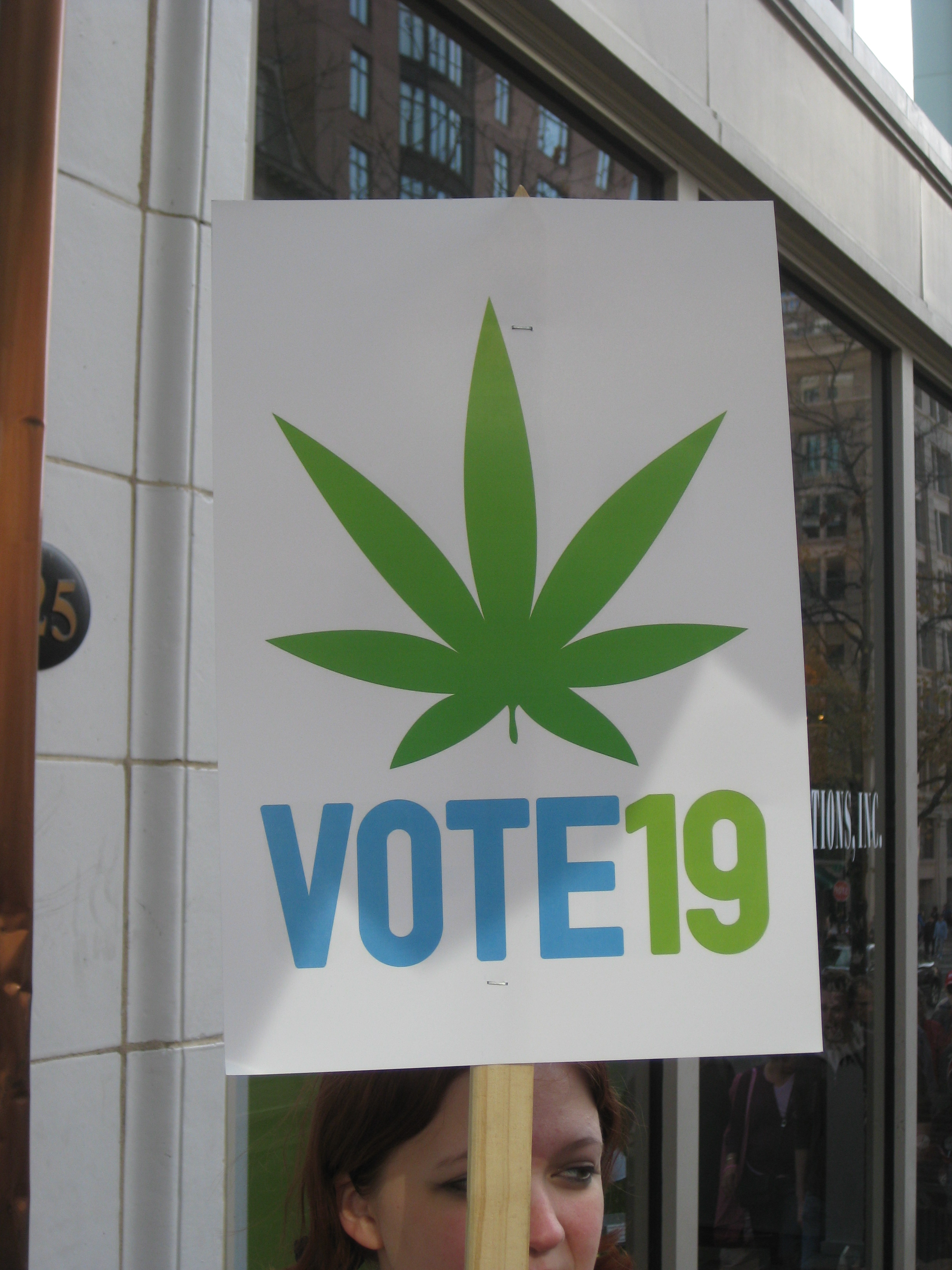
Taken October 30, 2010 (attribution to: www.futureatlas.com)

Several arguments were used in support of passing Proposition 19. Supporters argued that legalizing marijuana in California would help alleviate the drug war in Mexico. Based on the theory espoused by the White House Office of National Drug Control Policy that up to 60% of Mexican drug cartels’ profits come from sales of marijuana, legalizing the drug in nearby California would drastically cut their funding. As a result, supporters of this argument believed that legalization would lead to a decrease in drug-related violent crime in Mexico.

Also cited were expected financial benefits of passing the measure. Economists lauded an analysis by Jeffrey Miron predicting $7.7 billion in projected savings on law enforcement expenses related to marijuana offenses, as well as expected revenues of up to $6.2 billion annually in taxes. These revenues were calculated based on marijuana sales taxes structured similarly to alcohol and cigarettes. In 2008, California police made 78,500 arrests related to marijuana.

Some civil rights groups lauded Proposition 19 as a way to reduce the disproportionate number of arrests of African-Americans and Latinos in California, many of which were related to marijuana possession. A study released by the New York-based Drug Policy Alliance found that despite having lower marijuana consumption rates than young whites, young Latinos and African Americans were arrested for marijuana possession at much higher rates than whites in the 25 largest California counties.

Supporters also argued that passing the measure would result in additional benefits including tourism and spinoff industries such as cafes and paraphernalia. Based on California's wine industry, proponents of this theory anticipated that legalizing marijuana in the state could generate up to $18 billion, including the creation of 60,000-110,000 jobs.

Some argued that legalization of marijuana could reduce drug-related violence, based on a study conducted by the International Centre for Science in Drug Policy. This study found that drug law enforcement contributes to increased levels of drug-related violence and suggests that "alternative models for drug control" may be necessary.

=== Opposition ===
Opponents of Prop 19 argued that legalizing marijuana in California using the current proposition would have numerous negative consequences. They cited current Federal laws banning the cultivation, sale, and use of the drug, and claimed that it would create complications with drug trafficking and arrests as well as challenge Federal authority. Opponents also argued that Proposition 19 would complicate regulation across the state by allowing local jurisdictions the power to determine their own laws regarding cultivation and possession. Opponents claimed that this increased government activity would absorb much of the projected tax revenue.

Opponents of the measure also argued that it posed a public safety risk, based on research showing an association between marijuana use and voluntary treatment admissions for addiction, fatal drugged driving accidents, mental illness, and emergency room visits. Opponents also compared Prop 19 to current alcohol and tobacco regulation, arguing that the associated potential healthcare and criminal justice costs outweigh the tax revenue generated.

In response to supporters' claims regarding Prop 19's tax revenue generation, opponents claim the potential benefit is vastly overstated. Opponents also criticized the measure for failing to include specific accompanying tax proposals. Opponents also rejected the argument that revenue increases from the measure would improve the state budgetary deficit, dismissing it as a short-term fix.

Since California decriminalized the possession of small amounts of marijuana (under one ounce) in 1976, opponents reject the idea that legalization would free law enforcement to pursue violent crime in lieu of marijuana-related crime. A RAND Corporation study found that passage of the measure would likely do little to curtail the drug trade and cartel violence stemming from Latin America. Opponents also argued that passage would reflect softening attitudes in America toward drug consumption.

Supporters of medicinal marijuana use expressed concern that Prop 19 could burden growers with increased regulations. Also cited were potential confusion caused by double selling rules and a potential threat to existing protections for medical marijuana users.

== History ==
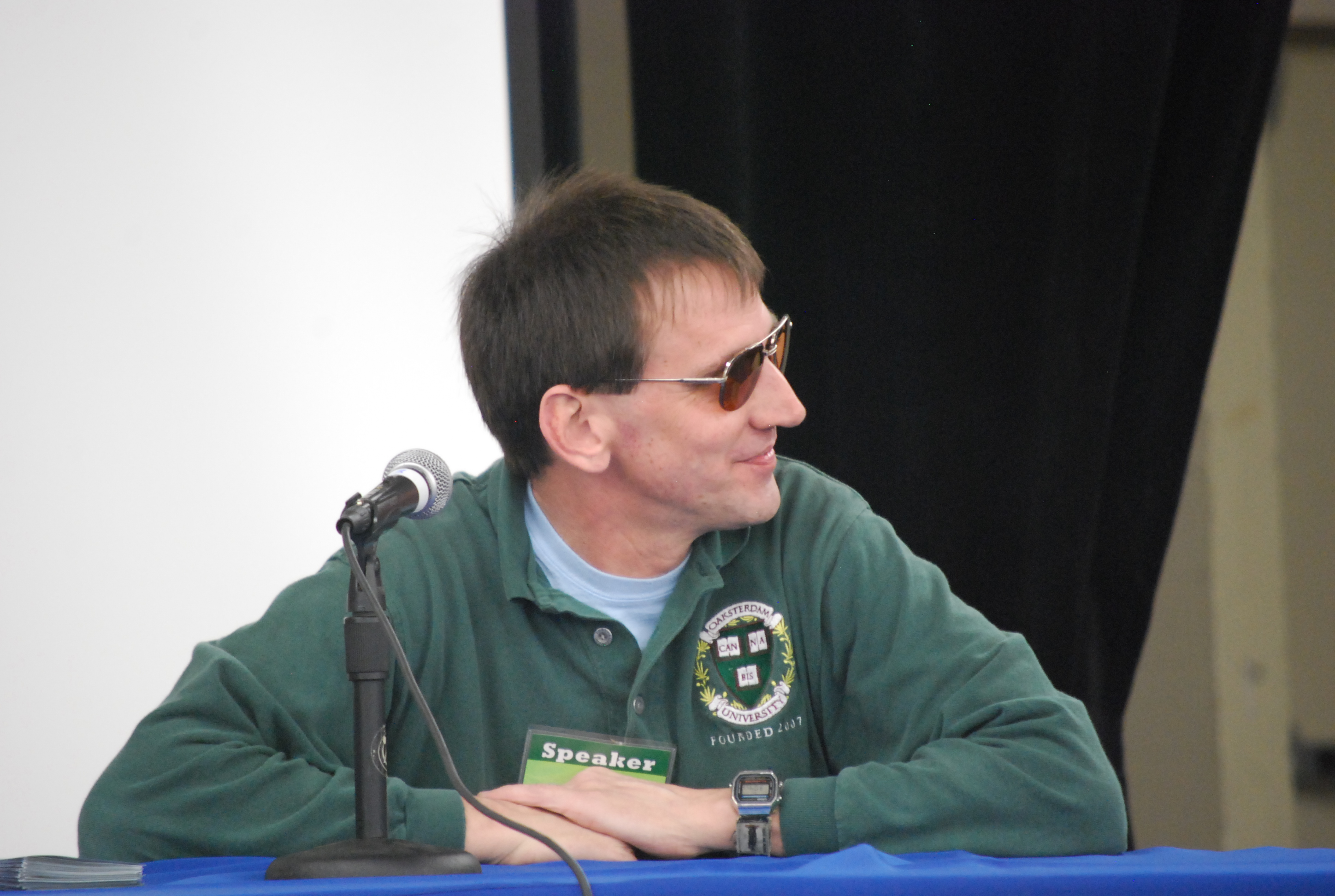
Activist Richard Lee

The first cannabis prohibition laws in California were passed in 1913. In the 1972 California November elections, a similar initiative to Proposition 19 which would have legalized cannabis was on the ballot, coincidentally also named Proposition 19. It failed to pass, with 66.5% voters voting "No" and 33.5% voting "Yes." In 1976 the passage of the Moscone Act changed small-scale possession of marijuana from a felony to a misdemeanor. Two decades later in 1996, Proposition 215, which legalized medical marijuana, passed with 56% of the vote. In 2003 the California Senate Bill SB 420 clarified some of Proposition 215 to address critics and issues that arose since it was passed. In 2005, Oakland’s Measure Z, one of the first marijuana taxes, made marijuana possession one of the lowest law enforcement priorities. It was passed by 65% of the voters. In July 2010, Oakland approved a cultivation ordinance.

Proposition 19's originator is Richard Lee, a marijuana legalization activist and medical marijuana provider based in Oakland. Lee named political consultant Chris Lehane as the head of the campaign to pass the measure. In order to qualify for the ballot, the initiative needed 433,971 valid petition signatures. The initiative proponents submitted 694,248 signatures, and it qualified through the random sample signature check.

== Stance on initiative ==
In response to growing demand for a vote on the legal status of marijuana, California governor Arnold Schwarzenegger said in May 2009, "I think it's time for a debate. And I think that we ought to study very carefully what other countries are doing that have legalized marijuana and other drugs, what effect it had on those countries, and are they happy with that decision." However, in his signing statement for California SB 1449, which decriminalized possession of less than an ounce of marijuana from a misdemeanor to an infraction, Schwarzenegger said he opposed Proposition 19, calling it "deeply flawed" and claiming that its potential for generating tax revenue has been overstated.

=== Support ===
- Laura Wells, 2010 California Green Party gubernatorial candidate
- Dale Ogden, 2010 California Libertarian gubernatorial candidate
- Carlos Alverez, 2010 California Peace and Freedom Party gubernatorial candidate
- Gary Johnson, former two term Republican governor of New Mexico, 2012 Libertarian Candidate for President
- Jesse Ventura, former Independent Governor of Minnesota
- Joycelyn Elders, former United States Surgeon General
- George Miller, current Democratic House Representative from California's 7th congressional district
- Barbara Lee, current Democratic House Representative from California's 9th congressional district
- Pete Stark, current Democratic House Representative from California's 13th congressional district
- John Dennis, 2010 Republican Congressional candidate for California's 8th congressional district
- Dan Hamburg, former Democratic House Representative from California's 1st congressional district
- Pete McCloskey, former Republican House Representative from California's 11th congressional district
- Don Perata, former Democratic President pro tempore of the California State Senate
- Mark Leno, current Democratic member of the California State Senate
- Tom Hayden, former Democratic member of the California State Senate
- Tom Ammiano, current Democratic member of the California State Assembly
- Hector De La Torre, current Democratic member of the California State Assembly
- Mary Hayashi, current Democratic member of the California State Assembly
- Jared Huffman, current Democratic member of the California State Assembly
- Nancy Skinner, current Democratic member of the California State Assembly
- Kerry Mazzoni, former Democratic member of the California State Assembly
- Vicente Fox, former president of Mexico
- Jorge Castañeda Gutman, former Secretary of Foreign Affairs of Mexico
- Tom Bates, current mayor of Berkeley, California
- Jim Gray, former Superior Court judge of Orange County, California and former Libertarian Party senate candidate
- John A. Russo, current City Attorney of Oakland, California
- Paul Gallegos, current District Attorney of Humboldt County, California
- Jeffrey Schwartz, former Senior District Attorney and Prosecutor of Humboldt County, California
- Terence Hallinan, former District Attorney of San Francisco, California
- Mike Schmier, former District Attorney of Los Angeles, California and California Administrative Law Judge
- Norm Stamper, former Seattle, Washington police chief
- Joseph McNamara, former San Jose, California police chief
- Stephen Downing, former Los Angeles, California police chief
- David Doodridge, former Los Angeles, California narcotics detective
- Larry Bedard, former president of the American College of Emergency Physicians
- George Soros, businessman and stock investor
- Jeffrey Miron, Harvard University economist
- Sean Parker, an Internet technology businessman and co-founder of Napster and Facebook
- Dustin Moskovitz, co-founder of Facebook
- Paul Buchheit, creator of Gmail, co-founder of FriendFeed, and prolific Silicon Valley angel investor
- Peter B. Lewis, former CEO of Progressive Insurance
- Ed Rosenthal, cannabis activist and columnist
- Marc Emery, cannabis activist and former cannabis seed seller
- California NAACP
- League of United Latin American Citizens
- Oakland City Council
- Berkeley City Council
- West Hollywood City Council
- Humboldt County Board of Supervisors
- National Organization for the Reform of Marijuana Laws (NORML)
- California NORML
- Drug Policy Alliance
- Marijuana Policy Project
- California Courage Campaign
- Law Enforcement Against Prohibition
- Students for Sensible Drug Policy
- Interfaith Drug Policy Initiative
- Progressive Jewish Alliance
- American Civil Liberties Union (ACLU) of Northern California
- ACLU of Southern California
- ACLU of San Diego
- American Federation of Teachers
- National Black Police Association
- National Latino Officers Association
- United Food and Commercial Workers Union
- Communications Workers of America, Local 9415
- International Longshore and Warehouse Union, Northern California District Council
- Service Employees International Union of California
- Editorial board of The Globe and Mail
- Editorial board of the Santa Barbara News-Press
- Alameda County Democratic Party
- Butte County Democratic Party
- Los Angeles County Democratic Party
- Madera County Democratic Party
- Modoc County Democratic Party
- Monterey County Democratic Party
- Orange County Democratic Party
- Placer County Democratic Party
- Santa Barbara County Democratic Party
- San Francisco County Democratic Party
- San Luis Obispo County Democratic Party
- Siskiyou County Democratic Party
- Sonoma County Democratic Party
- Ventura County Democratic Party
- Democratic Party of the San Fernando Valley
- Orange County Libertarian Party
- Riverside County Libertarian Party
- California Young Democrats
- Progressive Democrats of America
- Republican Liberty Caucus
- Green Party of California
- Peace and Freedom Party
- Libertarian Party of the United States

=== Opposition ===
- Arnold Schwarzenegger, former Republican governor of California
- Meg Whitman, 2010 California Republican gubernatorial candidate
- Jerry Brown, California Governor (2010 California Democratic gubernatorial candidate)
- Dianne Feinstein, Democratic Senator from California
- Barbara Boxer, Democratic senator from California
- Carly Fiorina, 2010 California Republican senatorial candidate
- Gil Kerlikowske, director of the Office of National Drug Control Policy, and former Seattle police chief
- Dan Lungren, current Republican House Representative from California's 3rd congressional district
- Nate Holden, former Democratic member of the California State Senate
- Gavin Newsom, 2010 Democratic candidate for California Lieutenant Governor
- Kamala Harris, 2010 Democratic candidate for California Attorney General
- Steve Cooley, District Attorney of Los Angeles, California and 2010 Republican candidate for California Attorney General
- Bonnie Dumanis, District Attorney of San Diego, California
- Leroy D. Baca, Sheriff of Los Angeles County, California
- Sandra Hutchens, Sheriff of Orange County, California
- Michael J. Rubio, Democratic Kern County, California supervisor
- Dennis Peron, co-author of California Proposition 215
- Louis R. Miller, chairman of D.A.R.E. America
- John Redman, executive director of Californians for Drug Free Youth
- Randy Thomasson, founder of Campaign for Children and Families and supporter of California Proposition 8
- National Organization of Black Law Enforcement Executives
- California Chamber of Commerce
- League of California Cities
- California State Association of Counties
- California Narcotics Officers Association
- California Police Chiefs Association
- California Association of Highway Patrolmen
- California State Sheriff's Association
- California District Attorneys Association
- California Bus Association
- Association of California School Administrators
- California Beer and Beverage Distributors
- California Cannabis Association
- Bishop, Dr. Ron Allen California. Founder/President/CEO International Faith Based Coalition.
- Mothers Against Drunk Driving
- National Black Churches Initiative
- Community Anti-Drug Coalitions of America
- The Heritage Foundation
- Editorial board of the San Francisco Chronicle
- Editorial board of the Sacramento Bee
- Editorial board of the Los Angeles Times
- Editorial board of the San Jose Mercury News
- Editorial board of the San Diego Union-Tribune

== Polling history ==
Color indicates the simple majority in a poll.

Date of opinion poll	Conducted by	Sample size (likely voters)	Methodology	Yes	No	Undecided	Margin of error
April 20, 2010	SurveyUSA	500	Automated	56%	42%	3%	±4.4%
May 9–16, 2010	Public Policy Institute of California	1168	Live	49%	48%	3%	±3%
June 22 – July 5, 2010	Field Poll	1005	Live	44%	48%	8%	±3.2%
July 8–11, 2010	SurveyUSA	614	Automated	50%	40%	10%	±4%
July 23–25, 2010	Public Policy Polling	614	Automated	52%	36%	12%	±3.95%
August 9–11, 2010	SurveyUSA	602	Automated	50%	40%	10%	±4.1%
August 31 – September 1, 2010	SurveyUSA	569	Automated	47%	43%	10%	±4.2%
September 20, 2010	Public Policy Polling	569	Automated	47%	38%	15%	±3.9%
September 26, 2010	Field Poll	599	Live	49%	42%	9%	±4.1%
September 30, 2010	Public Policy Institute of California	2,004	Live	52%	41%	7%	±3%
September 30 – October 3, 2010	SurveyUSA	670	Automated	48%	41%	11%	±3.9%
October 2–4, 2010	Ipsos	448	Live	44%	53%	3%	±4.7%
October 13–14, 2010	EMC Research	704	Live	40%	45%	14%	±3.7%
October 13–14, 2010	EMC Research	699	Automated	56%	41%	4%	±3.7%
October 10–17, 2010	Public Policy Institute of California	1,067		44%	49%	7%	±3.5%
October 15–18, 2010	SurveyUSA	621	Automated	48%	44%	8%	±4%
October 13–20, 2010	Los Angeles Times/University of Southern California	441	Live	39%	51%	10%	±4.6%
October 21–23, 2010	Public Policy Polling	622	Automated	45%	48%	7%	±3.9%
October 21–24, 2010	Suffolk University	600	Live	40%	55%	6%	±4%
October 21–25, 2010	SurveyUSA	594	Mixed	44%	46%	10%	±4.1%
October 14–26, 2010	Field Poll	1092	Live	42%	49%	9%	±3.2%
October 20–26, 2010	CNN/Time	888	Live	45%	53%	2%	±3.5%
October 26–31, 2010	SurveyUSA	587	Mixed	44%	46%	10%	±4.1%
October 29–31, 2010	Public Policy Polling	882	Automated	44%	51%	5%	±3.3%

=== Polling differences by poll type ===
Analysis of different polling techniques showed significant differentials in support for Proposition 19. Polls conducted by a live interviewer showed substantially less support for Proposition 19 than automated polls. It was suggested that there was a "social desirability bias" causing people to deny their support for Proposition 19 to live interviewers.

Another discrepancy was noted in the Action News/SurveyUSA poll taken in late October. Those interviewed via landlines opposed the initiative 53% to 43%, while those on cell phones supported it 54% to 29%.

== Outcome ==
Proposition 19
Choice	Votes	%
For	4,643,751	46.54
Against	5,333,359	53.46
Total	9,977,110	100.00

=== Results by major county ===
County (Major Cities)	Yes	No
Kern County (Bakersfield)	34.9%	65.1%
Fresno County (Fresno)	35.8%	64.2%
Stanislaus County (Modesto)	36.6%	63.4%
San Joaquin County (Stockton)	39.0%	61.0%
Sacramento County (Sacramento)	41.2%	58.8%
San Bernardino County (San Bernardino, Upland, Fontana, Ontario)	41.2%	58.8%
Riverside County (Riverside, Moreno Valley, Corona, Palm Springs)	41.9%	58.1%
Orange County (Santa Ana, Anaheim, Irvine, Huntington Beach, Laguna Beach)	42.2%	57.8%
Ventura County (Ventura, Oxnard, Thousand Oaks, Simi Valley)	44.8%	55.2%
Solano County (Fairfield, Vallejo)	45.5%	54.5%
San Diego County (San Diego, Chula Vista, Oceanside)	46.9%	53.1%
Los Angeles County (Los Angeles, Long Beach, Glendale, Santa Clarita, Pomona, Palmdale, Pasadena, Torrance, Inglewood, Burbank, Carson, Santa Monica etc.)	47.9%	52.1%
Santa Clara County (San Jose, Santa Clara, Cupertino, Gilroy, Palo Alto)	48.1%	51.9%
Napa County (Napa)	50.1%	49.9%
Santa Barbara County (Santa Barbara, Santa Maria)	51.2%	48.8%
Monterey County (Monterey, Salinas)	51.2%	48.8%
San Luis Obispo County (San Luis Obispo)	51.5%	48.5%
Alameda County (Oakland, Fremont, Hayward, Berkeley)	56.4%	43.6%
Marin County (San Rafael, Novato)	62.3%	37.7%
San Francisco County (San Francisco)	63.6%	36.4%
Santa Cruz County (Santa Cruz)	63.7%	36.3%

== See also ==
- California Proposition 215 (1996)
- California Proposition 36 (2000)
- California state elections, November 2010
- Cannabis in California
- Drug policy of California
- Legal history of cannabis in the United States
- Legality of cannabis
- Removal of cannabis from Schedule I of the Controlled Substances Act
