= Marijuana Control, Regulation, and Education Act =

Bill in the U.S. state of California

California State Legislature
- Long title: The California Marijuana Control, Regulation, and Education Act of 2009
- Enacted by: California State Legislature
- Introduced by: Tom Ammiano (D-13th-San Francisco)

The Marijuana Control, Regulation, and Education Act, also known as California Assembly Bill 390 (A.B. 390) and later Assembly Bill 2254 (A.B. 2254), is the first bill ever introduced to regulate the sale and use of marijuana in the U.S. state of California. If passed and signed into law, marijuana would be sold and taxed openly to adults age 21 and older in California. Tom Ammiano, a Democrat representing California's 13th State Assembly district, introduced this piece of legislation on February 23, 2009, arguing that the bill will "tax and regulate marijuana in a manner similar to alcohol." As introduced, this proposal is estimated to raise over $1 billion in annual revenue by taxing the retail production and sale of marijuana for adults 21 years of age and older. To obtain a commercial grow license one would pay an initial $5,000 fee, then a $2,500 fee each year after that. A tariff of $50 per ounce would also be placed on all sold and grown marijuana. The bill has gained much media attention, statewide and nationally.

The bill was not approved by the Health Committee before a January 15 deadline, effectively killing the bill until it was reintroduced in 2010 as A.B. 2254 and the process continued.

Recent polls say 56% of Californians favor taxing and regulating marijuana. In November 2010, the failed Proposition 19 was posed to Californian voters, and would have effectively made possession and cultivation of marijuana legal for citizens over the age of 21. The bill was reintroduced as Marijuana Control and Regulation Act of 2010 in slightly different form as Assembly Bill 9

== Introduction of the bill ==
Democrat Tom Ammiano from the California State Assembly's 13th district, introduced the Marijuana Control, Regulation and Education Act during the California budget crisis. The bill is designed to raise revenue for the state, but it also provides funding for the education of discouraging substance abuse, as mentioned in the name. As Mr. Ammiano introduced the bill, he is quoted saying:

With the state in the midst of an historic economic crisis, the move towards regulating and taxing marijuana is simply common sense. This legislation would generate much needed revenue for the state, restrict access to only those over 21, end the environmental damage to our public lands from illicit crops, and improve public safety by redirecting law enforcement efforts to more serious crimes. ...California has the opportunity to be the first state in the nation to enact a smart, responsible public policy for the control and regulation of marijuana.

A University of California, Santa Cruz study shows that people living in Cannabis-tolerant cities like Amsterdam and San Francisco are no more or less likely to use the drug. Prominent economists, specifically Jeffrey Miron, support the regulation of Cannabis due to the heavy violence across the U.S. and Mexico border. Economists argue that regulation would put infamous drug cartels, especially Los Zetas, out of business, improve safety standards and allow for more open research about the drug.

Cannabis is also believed to be California's number one cash crop. In California, marijuana is a $14-billion black market, putting it above vegetables ($5.7 billion) and grapes ($2.6 billion). AB 390 is projected to allow an additional economic benefit of $12 –18 billion.

=== Proponents ===
- Orange County Superior Court Judge James Gray estimates that legalizing marijuana and thus ceasing to arrest, prosecute, and imprison nonviolent offenders could "save the state $1 billion a year."
- Marijuana law reform groups such as Drug Policy Alliance, NORML, Marijuana Policy Project and Campaign Against Marijuana Prohibition CAMP 420 also support the bill.

=== Opponents ===
- John Lovell, lobbyist for the California Correctional Peace Officers Association, opposes the bill and is quoted saying "the last thing we need is another mind-altering substance to be legalized."

== Timeline ==
=== 2009 ===
A.B. 390

- February 23 — Read for the first time. To print.
- February 24 — From printer. May be heard in committee on March 26.
- March 9 — Referred to California State Assembly's Public Safety and Health Committees. Delayed until March 31.
- March 31 — Delayed: The bill is expected to be heard early 2010.

=== 2010 ===
- January 12 — Bill passes California State Assembly's Public Safety Committee on a 4–3 vote.
- January 15 — Deadline for the Bill to be heard and passed by the Health Committee or have to be reintroduced

A.B. 2254

- February 18 — Read first time. To print.
- February 19 — From printer. May be heard in committee March 21.
- March 11 — Referred to Coms. on PUB. S. and HEALTH.
- November 30 — From Committee without further action

Information about the bill, including current status and history, can be found on California's Legislative Website.

== See also ==
- Cannabis in California
- Drug policy of California
- Legality of cannabis
- Decriminalization of non-medical cannabis in the United States
- Places that have decriminalized non-medical cannabis in the United States
- Gonzales v. Raich
- California Proposition 215 (1996)
- California Proposition 36 (2000)
- California Proposition 5 (2008)
- California Proposition 19 (2010)
- Controlled Substances Act
- National Organization for the Reform of Marijuana Laws
