= Drug policy of California =

Overview of the drug policy of the U.S. state of California

Drug policy of California refers to the policy on various classes and kinds of drugs in the U.S. state of California. Cannabis possession has been legalized with the Adult Use of Marijuana Act, passed in November 2016, with recreational sales starting January of the next year. With respect to many controlled substances, terms such as illegal and prohibited do not include their authorized possession or sale as laid out by applicable laws.

On November 4, 2014, voters approved Proposition 47, which, among other things, reduced drug possession for personal use to a misdemeanor (except possession of more than one ounce of marijuana).

== Specific drugs ==
=== Alcohol ===
Alcohol is legal for adults 21 and over in the State of California to possess, purchase, and consume. Sale of alcohol is regulated and a license must be granted by county authorities before a store, bar, or restaurant may sell alcohol.

Driving a motor vehicle while intoxicated on alcohol is a misdemeanor which carries a penalty of up to one year in the county jail. Subsequent offenses may be charged as a felony under certain circumstances. In practice driving a motor vehicle while intoxicated will result in probation for first offenses, along with hefty fines, alcohol education, and community service. Subsequent offenses usually result in a small amount of jail time along with probation. Public intoxication on alcohol is a misdemeanor under state law and also under most municipal ordinances. Public intoxication on alcohol is often not prosecuted and the offender is released after sobering up in jail. Sometimes, depending on criminal history, those convicted of public intoxication may serve very small jail sentences.

The Department of Alcohol Beverage Control (ABC) is the Californian authority over alcohol licenses in the state. The department has outlawed the sale of alcohol to a "habitual drunkard" or any "obviously intoxicated person". Selling alcohol to a habitual drunkard or obviously intoxicated person is a misdemeanor under Section 25602 of the Business and Professions Code. The department also outlaws the sale or consumption of alcohol on licensed premises between 2 a.m. and 6 a.m. Selling or allowing the consumption of alcohol on licensed premises between these hours is a misdemeanor under Section 25632.

=== Amphetamines ===
Amphetamine, methamphetamine and dimethylamphetamine are Schedule 2 on the California Uniform Controlled Substances Act, which is part of the California Health and Safety Code. Methamphetamine is illegal for possession under Health and Safety Code 11377. Methamphetamines are illegal for possession for sale under Health and Safety Code 11378. In practice those without prior criminal histories convicted of HS 11377 will be granted PC1000, Proposition 36, or felony probation. Those convicted of HS 11378, possession of amphetamines for sale, may receive anything from probation up to 4 years in prison. Harsher sentences are given for those convicted of manufacturing amphetamines such as methamphetamine.

=== Cannabis ===
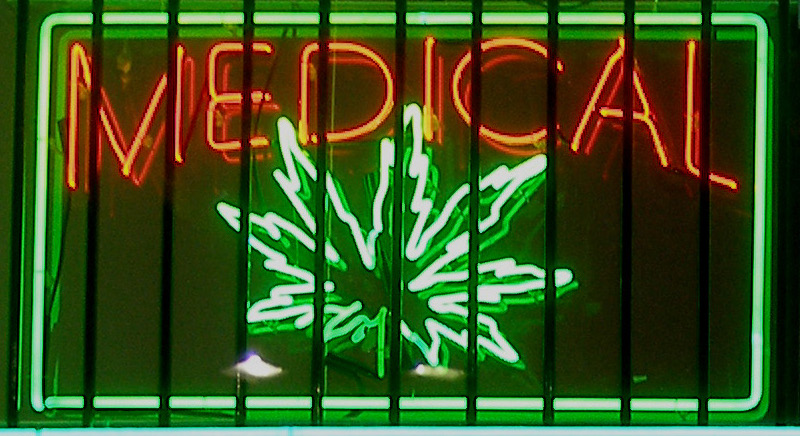
Medical marijuana sign at a dispensary on Ventura Boulevard in Los Angeles, California

All forms and preparations of cannabis, as well as its derivative tetrahydrocannabinol are Schedule 1 on the California Uniform Controlled Substances Act. The first cannabis prohibition laws in California were passed in 1913. In the 1972 California November elections an initiative titled Proposition 19, which would have legalized cannabis, was on the ballot. It failed to pass, with 66.5% voters voting "No" and 33.5% voting "Yes." In 1976 the passage of the Moscone Act changed small-scale possession of marijuana from a felony to a misdemeanor.

On November 5, 1996, 56% of voters approved Proposition 215 (also known as the Compassionate Use Act of 1996), taking effect the following day and removing state-level criminal penalties on the use, possession, and cultivation of marijuana by patients that "would benefit from medical marijuana" and possess a "written or oral recommendation" from their physician. Conditions typically covered by the law include arthritis, cachexia, cancer, chronic pain, HIV or AIDS, epilepsy, migraines, and multiple sclerosis. Initially, there existed no set limits regarding the amount of marijuana patients could possess or cultivate. California Senate Bill 420, also known as the Medical Marijuana Program Act, was signed into law in October 2003 and took effect on January 1, 2004, establishing the amount of medicinal marijuana patients and/or their caregivers may grow and possess. The bill allowed for no more than 8 ounces of dried marijuana and/or 6 mature (or 12 immature) plants, unless larger quantities were recommended by a physician. Senate Bill 420 also required the California Department of State Health Services to establish a voluntary patient registry and issue identification cards to patients, though no such registry has been established to date.

In February 2009, Tom Ammiano introduced the Marijuana Control, Regulation, and Education Act, the first bill attempting to legalize the sale and use of marijuana in California. If passed and signed into law, marijuana would be sold and taxed openly to adults age 21 and older in a manner similar to alcohol.

In September 2010, then Governor Arnold Schwarzenegger signed SB 1449 into law, which reduced possession of under 1 ounce of cannabis from a misdemeanor to a civil infraction. The law went into effect January 1, 2011.

In 2010, Proposition 19, titled the "Regulate, Control, and Tax Cannabis Act of 2010", qualified for the November California ballot. It failed to pass. If it had passed, the initiative would have legalized the recreational use of cannabis and its related activities in the State of California. It would have also allowed local governments to regulate and tax the newly created cannabis market.

In the November 2016 election, voters passed an initiative legalizing recreational use of marijuana, the Adult Use of Marijuana Act. Following the Act, California has been pioneering the development of an appellations of origin program for cannabis products.

The Adult Use of Marijuana Act went into effect on January 1, 2018. Adults 21 and over in California may now possess up to one ounce of dried marijuana or eight ounces of concentrated cannabis and can grow up to six marijuana plants for personal use subject to certain restrictions. It is still illegal to sell or possess marijuana with intent to sell without both a state and local license. Despite its legality in California, marijuana is still considered a Schedule 1 drug under the United States Controlled Substances Act. This means that federal prosecutors are allowed to decide to arrest and prosecute cannabis users and sellers who are in accordance to California law but not federal law.

=== Cocaine/Crack ===
Cocaine, crack cocaine, coca leaves and all other forms of cocaine are Schedule 2 on the California Uniform Controlled Substances Act. Cocaine is illegal to possess under California Health and Safety Code 11350. Possession under HS 11350 was formerly a prosecuted as a misdemeanor or felony with up to 3 years in prison, but Proposition 47 made simple possession for personal use a misdemeanor only. In practice, those charged with cocaine possession will in most cases be given an opportunity to plead guilty and receive no jail time under PC 1000, Prop 36, or felony supervised probation. People with prior records and especially those with prior drug possession records will often be given small jails terms such as 30, 90, or 180 days, along with felony probation.

Possession for sale of cocaine salt ("powder") is prohibited under Health and Safety Code 11351; "crack" cocaine under 11351.5. Penalties for possession for sale of cocaine salt are 2, 3, or 4 years in the state prison; for "crack" cocaine, 3, 4 or 5 years. Health and Safety Code 11352 pertains to selling or providing cocaine trafficking and provides for imprisonment for 3, 4 or 5 years. Those convicted of possession for sale HS 11351 or sale/trafficking under 11352 will often serve from 1 year in county jail to a sentence of 2–5 years in state prison, based upon the quantities of drugs, the extent of their criminal history, and the jurisdiction in which they are prosecuted. Those convicted of selling cocaine with prior related offenses may serve many years in the state prison, since qualifying prior convictions may add 3 years per conviction to the term provided for the conviction itself. Various enhancements exist in the California Health and Safety Code for dealing cocaine which may result in very long prison terms, such as selling to a minor, selling in a school zone, and selling large quantities of the drug.

=== Heroin and other opiates ===
Heroin is Schedule 1 on the California Uniform Controlled Substances Act. Heroin is illegal to possess under California Health and Safety Code 11350. Possession under HS 11350 can be prosecuted as a misdemeanor or felony with up to 3 years in prison. Possession for sale is illegal under Health and Safety Code 11351. Penalties for possession for sale is 2, 3, or 4 years in the state prison. Health and Safety Code 11352 pertains to sale/trafficking with increased penalties. Those convicted of possession for sale HS 11351 or sale/trafficking under 11352 will often serve from 1 year in county jail, or 18-month sentence in the state prison based upon the quantities and extent of their drug dealing if it is their first offense. Those convicted of selling cocaine with prior related offenses may serve up to 4 years in the state prison.

Raw opium, opium poppy and straw, as well as its derivatives morphine, oxycodone, hydrocodone and codeine are Schedule 2 on the California Uniform Controlled Substances Act.

=== Ketamine ===
Ketamine is Schedule 3 on the California Uniform Controlled Substances Act. Ketamine is illegal under Health and Safety Code 11377 HS. It is a misdemeanor to possess and punishment includes 6 months in jail and up to a $1,000 fine. Those charged with ketamine possession will in most cases be given an opportunity to plead guilty and receive no jail time under PC 1000, Prop 36, or felony supervised probation. People with prior records and especially those with prior drug possession records will often be given small jails terms such as 30, 90, or 180 days, along with felony probation. Ketamine is illegal to possess with intent to sell or actual sale under Health and Safety Code 11379.2 HS. The charge can be a misdemeanor or a felony. Those convicted of this offense as a misdemeanor, you face up to one-year in a county jail and a maximum $1,000 fine. If you are convicted of this offense as a felony, you face 16 months, or two or three years in the California state prison and a maximum $10,000 fine.

Recently, in People v. Davis, CSC Case No. 198434, the California Supreme Court ruled that possession of ecstasy (MDMA or methylenedioxy-methylamphetamine) without additional evidence is insufficient to sustain a conviction for possession of a controlled substance (11350 (a) HS).

=== MDMA (ecstasy) ===
3,4-Methylenedioxymethamphetamine (MDMA) is Schedule 1 on the California Uniform Controlled Substances Act. MDMA is illegal for possession under Health and Safety Code 11377. MDMA is illegal for possession for sale under Health and Safety Code 11378. In practice those without prior criminal histories convicted of HS 11377 will be granted PC1000, Prop 36, or felony probation. Those convicted of HS 11378, possession of MDMA for sale, may receive anything from probation up to 4 years in prison. California passed increased penalties for "hard drugs" with prop 36, but MDMA and LSD are exempt from those penalty increases.

=== Nicotine and tobacco products ===
Products containing nicotine such as tobacco, cigarettes, cigars and chewing tobacco are legal for adults 21 and over to possess, purchase, and consume. Sale of tobacco and nicotine-containing products is regulated and a license must be granted by the state before a store may sell tobacco and nicotine-containing products. (Effective June 9, 2016).

Since January 1, 1995, smoking has been banned in all enclosed workplaces in California, including restaurants and bars (bars were excluded until January 1, 1998), exempting only the following areas: workplaces with five or fewer employees (as long as all workers consent and persons under 18 are prohibited from the smoking area), 65% of the guest rooms of hotels/motels, lobby areas of hotels/motels designated for smoking (not to exceed 25% of the total lobby floor area or, if the lobby area is 2,000 square feet (190 m^{2}) or less, not to exceed 50% of the total lobby floor area), meeting and banquet rooms except while food or beverage functions are taking place (including set-up, service, and clean-up activities or when the room is being used for exhibit activities), retail or wholesale tobacco shops and private smokers lounges (i.e. cigar bars), truck cabs/tractors if no nonsmoking employees are present, non-office warehouse facilities with more than 10,000 square feet (930 m^{2}) of total floor space and 20 or fewer full-time employees working at the facility, theatrical production sites if smoking is an integral part of the story, medical research or treatment sites if smoking is integral to the research or treatment being conducted, private residences except homes licensed as family day care homes during the hours of operation and in those areas where children are present, patient smoking areas in long-term health care facilities, and employee breakrooms designated for smoking.

Effective January 1, 2004, California bill AB846 bans smoking within 20 feet (6.1 m) of the entrance or operable window of a public building ("public building" means a building owned and occupied, or leased and occupied, by the state, a county, a city, a city and county, or a California Community College district.) The law also prohibits smoking in state owned vehicles. Additionally, effective January 1, 2008, smoking in a moving vehicle while in the presence of a minor (18 years or younger) is an infraction; the charge is not serious enough to be pulled over, and only can be cited along with a stricter offense, such as a moving violation or traffic accident. Local jurisdictions may regulate smoking more strictly than the state. Many California communities have established smoke-free registries for private residential apartment buildings, which range from complexes where smoking is entirely prohibited (whether inside private dwellings or outside) to those where certain sections of dwellings may be designated as smoking dwellings. Most California cities allow landlords to regulate smoking at will.

=== Psilocybin (mushrooms) ===
Psilocybin and its metabolized counterpart psilocin are Schedule 1 on the California Uniform Controlled Substances Act. Mushrooms containing psilocybin and psilocin, as well as psilocybin mushroom spores are illegal to possess, import, buy, sell, trade, or give away if intended to be cultivated. Growing psilocybin-containing mushrooms from spores is considered manufacturing a controlled substance.

Psilocybin itself still categorized as a Schedule I Controlled Substance according to the United States Drug Enforcement Administration under federal law. Schedule I drugs are identified as those with the highest potential for substance abuse, and has chemical properties that enables addictive behavior. Under California Law, possession of Psilocybin Mushrooms can result in a range of penalties varying from a $1,000 fine, mandatory community service, or potentially serving one year in county jail. Whereas distributing a Schedule I Controlled Substance such as psilocybin is recorded as a felony, with the potential to serve in a jail or state prison. In California, the Controlled Substances Act of 1970 still prohibits any use or possession of psilocybin, or any other psychedelics.

Following World War II, a new social movement referred to as "Psychedelic Culture" became increasingly popular amongst young adults. As the Psychedelic Culture movement rapidly grew, concerns for increased drug use became a national issue, which led to the implementation of The Controlled Substances Act of 1970

However, on February 17, 2021, Senator Scott Wiener proposed Senate Bill-519 which would overturn all previous legal consequences towards psychedelics. Senate Bill-519 gained approval on June 29, 2021 on the terms that Ketamine would be redacted from the original proposal. Senate Bill-519 was approved with a 5-3 vote from the Assembly Public Safety Committee for their advocacy towards the use of furthering scientific research behind psychedelic therapy treatment. Psilocybin has been in the process of undergoing clinical trials as mental health professionals and scientists gather data demonstrating the drugs potential benefits. Upon approval from the Drug Enforcement Administration, psilocybin have both been used in clinical trials in attempts to study the medicinal purposes. University of California, San Francisco has invested in clinical trials of psilocybin as part of a treatment to mental health diagnoses such as Bipolar II Disorder as well as Depression. In September 2020, there have been over 1,000 reported clinical trials of Psilocybin therapy research conducted for various diagnoses and have even produced evidence to show that the psychotherapy approach demonstrates prolonged antidepressant effects.

== Other drugs ==
Lysergic acid diethylamide (LSD) is Schedule 1 on the California Uniform Controlled Substances Act. LSD is illegal for possession under Health and Safety Code 11377. LSD is illegal for possession for sale under Health and Safety Code 11378. All forms of peyote and its derivatives, including its active compound mescaline are Schedule 1 on the California Uniform Controlled Substances Act. Dimethyltryptamine (DMT), 4-methyl-2,5-dimethoxyamphetamine (DOM/STP), gamma-hydroxybutyric acid (GHB), bufotenin (toad venom) and ibogaine are Schedule 1 on the California Uniform Controlled Substances Act.

Phencyclidine (PCP) is Schedule 2 on the California Uniform Controlled Substances Act. PCP is illegal for possession under Health and Safety Code 11377. PCP is illegal for possession for sale under Health and Safety Code 11378.

Anabolic steroids, including testosterone and human chorionic gonadotropin are Schedule 3 on the California Uniform Controlled Substances Act.

On August 31, 2011, California Legislature passed SB 514, which banned the sale of dextromethorphan (DXM), the active ingredient in most over-the-counter cough medicines, to minors.

== See also ==
- Law of California
- Occupational health concerns of cannabis use
