= 2024 California Proposition 36 =

Proposition 36
- November 5, 2024
- Allow Felony Charges and Increases Sentences for Certain Theft and Drug Crimes.

Results
Choice	Votes	%
Yes	10,307,296	68.42%
No	4,756,612	31.58%
Total votes	15,063,908	100.00%

Yes
90–100%
80–90%
70–80%
60–70%
50–60%
No
90–100%
80–90%
70–80%
60–70%
50–60%

Proposition 36, titled Allows Felony Charges and Increases Sentences for Certain Drug and Theft Crimes, was an initiated California ballot proposition and legislative statute that was passed by a landslide in the 2024 general election and went into effect in December 2024. The proposition repealed parts of Proposition 47, passed during the 2014 general election, and amends the state constitution to increase penalties and allow felony charges for certain crimes.

The proposition will allow for the authorization of the following:

- Increasing the penalty for repeat shoplifters (two or more past convictions) of $950 in value or less from a misdemeanor to a felony, punishable by up to three years in prison.
- Allowing felony sentences for certain crimes such as theft or damage to property to be lengthened if the crime is committed by a group of three or more people.
- Requiring that sentences for certain felonies such as drug dealing be served in prison.
- Allowing people convicted of possession of illegal drugs (specifically those who possess certain drugs such as methamphetamines or fentanyl or those who have two or more past convictions for drug crimes) to be charged with a "treatment-mandated felony" instead of a misdemeanor in some cases. Upon completion of treatment, charges will be dismissed. Upon failure to complete treatment, charges stand and include up to three years in state prison.
- Requiring courts to warn people that they could be charged with murder if they sell or provide illegal drugs (such as methamphetamines, fentanyl, heroin, and cocaine) that kill someone. This could allow for murder charges in the future if they later sell or provide illegal drugs to someone who dies.

== Background ==
In 2014, California voters passed Proposition 47, which reclassified several felonies as misdemeanors. Proposition 47 passed with nearly 60% of votes across California, and was supported by the editorial board of the New York Times, the editorial board of the Los Angeles Times, and the American Civil Liberties Union. Support for Proposition 47 largely hinged on concerns about the overcrowding of California prisons, deemed an Eighth Amendment violation by the U.S. Supreme Court in 2011, as well as arguments for the reallocation of funds to other crime prevention measures.

In the first five months after Proposition 47 was instated, prison populations dropped by approximately 9,000. As per the U.S. Supreme Court's Brown v. Plata, the prison population reduction necessary to satisfy constitutional requirements could be as high as 46,000 people. As a result of severe overcrowding in California prisons, the findings of the District court in that case affirmed that, “[I]t is an uncontested fact that, on average, an inmate in one of California's prisons needlessly dies every six to seven days due to constitutional deficiencies in the [California prisons’] medical delivery system.”

In addition to making a significant reduction in prison populations, Proposition 47 reallocated savings from state incarceration costs in the following ways: 65% to the Board of State and Community Corrections for drug treatment, mental health programs, and housing; 25% to the Board of Education to address truancy, and 10% to the California Victim Compensation Program to provide grants for victims of crime. The use of county-level savings were left to the discretion of county officials. Since 2014, Proposition 47 has generated nearly $1 billion in savings from reductions in incarceration, with funds diverted to programming for homelessness, to reduce recidivism, and to support job seeking programs.

Since then, prosecutors and police organizations have blamed the proposition for the state's increased retail theft, which in 2023 were reported to have reached the highest recorded level since 2000. Statistics released in July 2024 by the California Department of Justice have stated that those earlier figures were inflated and that 2019 through 2024 figures indicate a decline in almost all major crime categories. Some local officials have also blamed the state's increase in homelessness on Proposition 47, which eliminated the legal compulsion of treatment for those struggling from addiction and mental illnesses. Statistics and analysis released from the Board of State and Community Corrections (BSCC) in February 2024 states that Proposition 47-funded programs reduced unemployment, homelessness and recidivism.

In 2024, a campaign was started to qualify Proposition 36 for the November ballot. Despite being opposed by criminal justice reform groups and prominent Democrats such as Governor Gavin Newsom, who at first tried to negotiate competing legislation in order to keep the measure off the ballot and then proposed a competing ballot measure, the proposition gained strong support from Republicans and divided Democrats, with several prominent local officials such as San Francisco mayor London Breed and several members of the state legislature coming out in favor of the measure.

Major financial backers of Proposition 36 include Walmart ($2.5 million), Home Depot ($1 million), Target ($1 million), In-N-Out Burger ($500,000), the California Correctional Peace Officers Association ($300,000) and Macy's ($215,000).

== Support ==
The official support statement of Proposition 36 argues that "Prop. 36 makes California communities safer by addressing rampant theft and drug trafficking. It toughens penalties for fentanyl and drug traffickers and "smash-and-grabs" while holding repeat offenders accountable. It targets serial thieves and encourages treatment for those addicted to drugs, using a balanced approach to fix loopholes in current laws."

Supporters

State officials

- Fiona Ma, California State Treasurer (2019–present) (Democratic)

U.S. representatives

- Ken Calvert, CA-41 (1993–present) (Republican)
- Vince Fong, CA-20 (2024–present) (Republican)
- Kevin Kiley, CA-03 (2023–present) (Republican)
- Doug LaMalfa, CA-01 (2013–present) (Republican)
- David Valadao, CA-22 (2023–present) (Republican)

State senators

- Marie Alvarado-Gil, SD-04 (2023–present) (Republican)
- Rosilicie Ochoa Bogh, SD-23 (2020–present) (Republican)
- Brian Dahle, SD-01 (2019–2024) (Republican)
- Shannon Grove, SD-12 (2018–present) (Republican)
- Melissa Hurtado, SD-16 (2023–present) (Democratic)
- Brian Jones, SD-16 (2018–present) (Republican)
- Dave Min, SD-37 (2020–2024) (Democratic)
- Josh Newman, SD-29 (2016–2018, 2020–2024) (Democratic)
- Roger Niello, SD-06 (2022–present) (Republican)
- Susan Rubio, SD-22 (2018–present) (Democratic)
- Kelly Seyarto, SD-32 (2022–present) (Republican)
- Tom Umberg, SD-34 (2018–present) (Democratic)
- Scott Wilk, SD-21 (2016–2024) (Republican)

State assemblymembers

- Juan Alanis, AD-22 (2022–present) (Republican)
- Jasmeet Bains, AD-35 (2022–present) (Democratic)
- Phillip Chen, AD-59 (2016–present) (Republican)
- Megan Dahle, AD-01 (2019–2024) (Republican)
- Laurie Davies, AD-74 (2020–present) (Republican)
- Diane Dixon, AD-72 (2020–present) (Republican)
- Bill Essayli, AD-63 (2022–2025) (Republican)
- Heath Flora, AD-09 (2016–present) (Republican)
- James Gallagher, AD-60 (2014–present) (Republican)
- Josh Hoover, AD-07 (2022–present) (Republican)
- Tom Lackey, AD-34 (2014–present) (Republican)
- Devon Mathis, AD-33 (2014–2024) (Republican)
- Stephanie Nguyen, AD-10 (2022–present) (Democratic)
- Blanca Pacheco, AD-64 (2022–present) (Democratic)
- Jim Patterson, AD-08 (2012–2022) (Republican)
- Joe Patterson, AD-05 (2022–present) (Republican)
- James Ramos, AD-45 (2018–present) (Democratic)
- Freddie Rodriguez, AD-53 (2013–2024) (Democratic)
- Kate Sanchez, AD-71 (2022–present) (Republican)
- Tri Ta, AD-70 (2022–present) (Republican)
- Greg Wallis, AD-47 (2022–present) (Republican)

Local officials

- Ashleigh Aitken, Mayor of Anaheim (2022–present) (Democratic)
- Joel Anderson, member of the San Diego County Board of Supervisors from the 2nd district (2021–present) (Republican)
- Kathryn Barger, chair (2019–2020, 2024–present) of the Los Angeles County Board of Supervisors from the 5th district (2016-present) (Republican)
- Don Barnes, Sheriff-Coroner of Orange County, California (2019–present) (Republican)
- London Breed, Mayor of San Francisco (2017–2018, 2018–2025) (Democratic)
- Jim Desmond, member of the San Diego County Board of Supervisors from the 5th district (2019–present) (Republican)
- Doug Chaffee, former chair of the Orange County Board of Supervisors (2022–2023) from the 4th district (2019–present) (Democratic)
- Matt Dorsey, member of the San Francisco Board of Supervisors from the 6th district (2022–present) (Democratic)
- Jerry Dyer, Mayor of Fresno (2021–present) (Republican)
- Kevin Faulconer, former mayor of San Diego (2014–2022) (Republican)
- Katrina Foley, member of the Orange County Board of Supervisors from the 5th district (2021–present) (Democratic)
- Todd Gloria, mayor of San Diego (2013–2014, 2020–present) (Democratic)
- Karen Goh, Mayor of Bakersfield (2017–present) (Republican)
- Kevin Lincoln, Mayor of Stockton (2021–2025) (Republican)
- Matt Mahan, Mayor of San Jose (2023–present) (Democratic)
- Traci Park, member of the Los Angeles City Council from the 11th district (2022–present) (Democratic)
- Todd Spitzer, District Attorney of Orange County (2019–present) (Republican)
- Summer Stephan, San Diego County District Attorney (2017–present) (Independent)
- Helen Tran, Mayor of San Bernardino (2022–present) (Democratic)
- Donald P. Wagner, Chair of the Orange County Board of Supervisors (2023–2025) from the 3rd district (2019–present) (Republican)
- Steve Vaus, Mayor of Poway (2014–present) (Republican)
- Antonio Villaraigosa, former mayor of Los Angeles (2005–2013) (Democratic)

County boards of supervisors

- Fresno County Board of Supervisors
- Kern County Board of Supervisors
- Orange County Board of Supervisors
- Placer County Board of Supervisors
- San Joaquin County Board of Supervisors
- Ventura County Board of Supervisors

City councils

- City of Arcadia
- City of Canyon Lake
- City of La Habra
- City of La Puente
- City of La Verne
- City of Rosemead
- City of Riverside
- City of Temecula
- City of Whittier

Individuals

- Steve Garvey, former professional baseball player and 2024 senate candidate (Republican)
- George T. Whitesides, former CEO of Virgin Galactic and 2024 candidate for CA-27 (Democratic)

Newspapers

- East Bay Times
- Marin Independent Journal
- Napa Valley Register
- San Diego Union-Tribune
- Santa Cruz Sentinel
- The Bakersfield Californian
- The Mercury News

Labor unions

- California Correctional Peace Officers Association
- San Francisco Police Officers Association

Organizations

- California Chamber of Commerce
- California Rifle and Pistol Association
- California State Association of Counties
- Howard Jarvis Taxpayers Association
- League of California Cities
- National Federation of Independent Business

Native American tribes

- Rincon Band of Luiseño Indians
- San Manuel Band of Mission Indians
- Sycuan Band of the Kumeyaay Nation
- Table Mountain Rancheria
- United Auburn Indian Community

Political parties

- California Republican Party

== Opposition ==
The official opposition statement argues: "Don't be fooled. Proposition 36 will lead to more crime, not less. It reignites the failed war on drugs, makes simple drug possession a felony, and wastes billions on prisons, while slashing crucial funding for victims, crime prevention, treatment, and rehabilitation. This puts prisons first and guts treatment. Vote No."

Opponents stress the limited resources available for anyone charged with Prop 36's new treatment-mandated felony care facilities for Californians with substance use disorders. In addition, resources for those experiencing mental health crises are already insufficient, and Prop 36 will only make matters worse. According to Sacramento County's behavioral health director, Dr. Quist, counties across the state "simply don't have enough capacity right now to take on a whole new population of folks that are getting mandated into treatment."

The California Legislative Analyst's Office claims that Prop 36 would cost the state tens of millions of dollars in policing and incarceration, funds that currently support mental health and drug treatment programs.

=== Immigration and deportation concerns ===
Immigration advocates have expressed strong concerns about Proposition 36, arguing that it could lead to an increase in deportations of non-citizen Californians, including green card holders, DACA recipients, and refugees. The proposition reclassifies certain misdemeanor offenses, such as drug and theft, as felonies, which could have severe immigration consequences. Under U.S. immigration law, a felony conviction can be considered an "aggravated felony," which often results in mandatory deportation regardless of length of residency.

Grisel Ruiz, a supervising attorney at the Immigrant Legal Resource Center, warned that Prop 36 would significantly increase the number of illegal aliens facing deportation. For example, if petty theft misdemeanors become reclassified as felonies, then more immigrants—including green card holders—will be barred from obtaining legal status and may lose any legal status they previously had, including their ability to obtain a green card and their ability to access valuable waivers to fight deportation cases, "which means deportation even if that would cause USC [U.S. Citizen] or LPR [Lawful Permanent Resident] dependents extraordinary hardship." Advocates are concerned about the effect this could have on immigrant families in California, because families are separated during deportation, leaving children without parents: "one in four people in California is foreign born, and half of all children in California have at least one immigrant parent."

=== Public financing: allocation of funds ===
Critics claim that Proposition 36 reinforces rigid sentencing laws that prioritize punishment over rehabilitation. The California Budget and Policy Center warns that Proposition 36 may impose additional unfunded financial burdens on both state and local governments. This could force local leaders to cut funding for essential public services to manage these unexpected expenses.

Proposition 36 would remove significant components of Proposition 47, which allocated funds to the Safe Neighborhoods and Schools Fund. This fund provided support for behavioral health services, K-12 education, and trauma recovery programs for crime victims. According to a report released by the office of Governor Newsom (who actively campaigned against the measure), Proposition 47 had generated an estimated $95 million in savings for the 2024-25 state budget. Funds that were saved by incarcerating fewer people were redirected to crime prevention and substance treatment programs. The misdemeanor chargee imposes less of an impact on incarcerated people's future employment opportunities and access to housing, which creates additional cost savings. The recidivism rates of Prop 47 reentry programs were 15.3%, between two and three times lower than the average recidivism rate for people who have served prison sentences.

If Proposition 36 were to be enacted, the savings would diminish by tens of millions of dollars, according to the Legislative Analyst's Office (LAO), or potentially vanish entirely, per the Center for Social Justice (CSJ) assessment. Such changes would result in a substantial decrease in funding for programs aimed at crime reduction, youth support, and victim recovery. Essentially, Proposition 36 would shift tens of millions of dollars annually away from behavioral health services and other initiatives back into the state prison system.

The California Budget and Policy Center released a report estimating that Proposition 36 would increase prison costs, cutting funding for behavioral health services, K-12 school programs for vulnerable youth, and trauma recovery services for crime victims, which have been supported with the savings that come from Prop 47. Another concern is that Prop 36 could push more people into homelessness, since formerly incarcerated people are ten times more likely to experience homelessness.

=== Increase in incarceration ===
It is projected that Proposition 36 could increase the state prison population by 35% by 2029. The current estimated number of people in prison is approximately 90,000. If proposition 36 passes, it is estimated to create overcrowded prisons again, at an estimate of roughly 50,000 people incarcerated for drug possession and 33,000 more people in prison over the course of seven years.

Opponents

State officials

- Gavin Newsom, Governor of California (2019–present) (Democratic)
- Malia Cohen, California State Controller (2023–present) (Democratic)
- Betty Yee, former California State Controller (2015–2023) and candidate for governor in 2026 (Democratic)

U.S. senators

- Alex Padilla, U.S. senator from California (2021–present) (Democratic)

U.S. representatives

- Judy Chu, CA-28 (2009–present) (Democratic)

State senators

- Dave Cortese, SD-15 (2020–present) (Democratic)
- Maria Elena Durazo, SD-26 (2021–present) (Democratic)
- Mike McGuire, President pro tempore of the California State Senate (2024–present) from SD-02 (2014–present) (Democratic)
- Lola Smallwood-Cuevas, SD-37 (2022–present) (Democratic)
- Scott Wiener, SD-11 (2016–present) (Democratic)

State assemblymembers

- Cecilia Aguiar-Curry, AD-04 (2016–present) (Democratic)
- Mia Bonta, AD-18 (2021–present) (Democratic)
- Isaac Bryan, AD-55 (2021–present) (Democratic)
- Jasmeet Bains, AD-35 (2022–present) (Democratic)
- Matt Haney, AD-17 (2022–present) (Democratic)
- Gregg Hart, AD-37 (2022–present) (Democratic)
- Chris Holden, AD-41 (2012–2024) (Democratic)
- Corey Jackson, AD-60 (2022–present) (Democratic)
- Reggie Jones-Sawyer, AD-57 (2012–2024) (Democratic)
- Ash Kalra, AD-25 (2016–present) (Democratic)
- Alex Lee, AD-24 (2020–present) (Democratic)
- Josh Lowenthal, AD-69 (2022–present) (Democratic)
- Tina McKinnor, AD-61 (2022–present) (Democratic)
- Anthony Rendon, former Speaker of the California State Assembly (2016–2023) from AD-62 (2012–2024) (Democratic)
- Sharon Quirk-Silva, AD-65 (2012–2014, 2016–present) (Democratic)
- Luz Rivas, AD-43 (2018–2024) (Democratic)
- Robert Rivas, Speaker of the California State Assembly (2023–present) from AD-29 (2018–present) (Democratic)
- Phil Ting, AD-19 (2012–2024) (Democratic)
- Chris Ward, AD-78 (2020–present) (Democratic)
- Lori Wilson, AD-11 (2022–present) (Democratic)

Local officials

- Diana Becton, Contra Costa County District Attorney (2017–present) (Democratic)
- George Gascon, Los Angeles County District Attorney (2020–2024) (Democratic)
- Eunisses Hernandez, member of the Los Angeles City Council from the 1st district (2022–present) (Democratic)
- Lindsey Horvath, Chair of the Los Angeles County Board of Supervisors (2022–present) (Democratic)
- Terra Lawson-Remer, member of the San Diego County Board of Supervisors from the 3rd district (2021–present) (Democratic)
- Holly Mitchell, member of the Los Angeles County Board of Supervisors from the 2nd district (2020–present) (Democratic)
- Dean Preston, member of the San Francisco Board of Supervisors from the 5th district (2019–2025) (Democratic)
- Pamela Price, Alameda County District Attorney (2023–2024) (Democratic)
- Manohar Raju, Public Defender of San Francisco (2019–present) (Democratic)
- Vicente Sarmiento, member of the Orange County Board of Supervisors from the 2nd district (2023–present) (Democratic)
- Hilda Solis, member of the Los Angeles County Board of Supervisors from the 1st district (2014–present) (Democratic)
- Darrell Steinberg, Mayor of Sacramento (2016–2024) (Democratic)
- Shamann Walton, member of the San Francisco Board of Supervisors from the 10th district (2019–present) (Democratic)

County boards of supervisors

- Los Angeles County Board of Supervisors

Newspapers

- Los Angeles Times

Organizations

- ACLU of Northern California
- League of Women Voters of California

Political parties

- California Democratic Party
- Green Party of California
- Peace and Freedom Party

== Polling ==
Date of opinion poll	Conducted by	Sample size (Note: Key: A – all adults RV – registered voters LV – likely voters V – unclear)	Margin of Error	In favor	Against	Undecided
October 28 – October 30, 2024	Competitive Edge Research	517 (RV)	± 4.3%	62%	31%	8%
October 22 – October 28, 2024	UC Berkeley IGS	4,341 (LV)	± 2.0%	60%	25%	15%
October 7 – October 15, 2024	Public Policy Institute of California	1,137 (LV)	± 3.7%	73%	25%	2%
September 25 – October 1, 2024	UC Berkeley IGS	3,045 (LV)	± 2.5%	60%	21%	19%
September 12 – September 25, 2024	University of Southern California/CSU Long Beach/Cal Poly Pomona	1,685 (LV)	± 2.4%	58%	19%	23%
August 29 – September 9, 2024	Public Policy Institute of California	1,071 (LV)	± 3.7%	71%	26%	3%
July 31 – August 11, 2024	UC Berkeley IGS	3,765 (LV)	± 2.0%	56%	23%	21%

== Results ==
Proposition 3
Choice	Votes	%
For	10,307,296	68.42
Against	4,756,612	31.58
Total	15,063,908	100.00
Registered voters/turnout		–

=== By county ===
County	Yes	Yes %	No	No %	Total	Note (Note: Key: ✔ – Support ✘ – Oppose)
Los Angeles	1,977,025	65.15	1,057,598	34.85	3,034,623	✔
Orange	870,874	75.53	282,186	24.47	1,153,060	✔
San Diego	912,939	65.27	485,821	34.73	1,398,760	✔
Riverside	657,958	73.10	242,098	26.90	900,056	✔
San Bernardino	345,347	74.74	116,698	25.26	462,045	✔
Santa Clara	497,158	69.44	218,760	30.56	715,918	✔
Ventura	257,712	68.91	116,268	31.09	373,980	✔
San Francisco	241,916	63.86	136,902	36.14	378,818	✔
Alameda	207,123	65.43	109,421	34.57	316,544	✔
Fresno	236,650	75.29	77,666	24.71	314,316	✔
Sacramento	426,960	68.43	196,977	31.57	623,937	✔
Contra Costa	358,471	69.88	154,481	30.12	512,952	✔
San Mateo	211,157	67.53	101,540	32.47	312,697	✔
Sonoma	142,436	59.66	96,301	40.34	238,737	✔
Placer	173,591	76.75	52,600	33.25	226,191	✔
San Joaquin	190,189	75.56	61,527	24.44	251,716	✔
Kern	210,475	76.76	63,737	23.24	274,212	✔
Santa Barbara	497,158	69.44	218,760	30.56	715,918	✔
Solano	127,364	70.16	54,181	29.84	181,545	✔
San Luis Obispo	94,611	66.04	48,651	33.96	143,262	✔
Marin	80,854	59.96	53,993	40.04	134,847	✔
Stanislaus	142,250	75.22	46,855	24.78	189,105	✔
Santa Cruz	67,455	53.38	58,907	46.62	126,362	✔
El Dorado	59,719	75.55	19,327	24.45	79,046	✔
Monterey	88,482	63.63	51,480	36.37	139,062	✔
Tulare	53,786	78.90	14,380	21.10	68,166	✔
Butte	64,491	71.31	25,951	28.69	90,442	✔
Shasta	69,036	81.65	15,516	18.35	84,552	✔
Yolo	53,424	60.11	35,457	39.89	88,881	✔
Nevada	39,583	66.32	20,102	33.68	59,685	✔
Humboldt	34,571	56.52	26,600	43.48	61,171	✔
Merced	59,600	73.55	21,434	26.45	81,034	✔
Napa	41,639	67.03	20,479	32.97	62,118	✔
Madera	40,710	77.41	11,877	22.59	52,587	✔
Mendocino	22,336	60.29	14,714	39.71	37,050	✔
Sutter	30,070	79.66	7,678	20.34	37,748	✔
Imperial	39,781	77.26	12,161	22.74	51,492	✔
Tuolumne	21,053	76.00	6,648	24.00	27,701	✔
Kings	31,619	77.95	8,945	22.05	40,564	✔
Calaveras	19,553	76.92	5,866	23.08	25,419	✔
Tehama	20,957	81.75	4,677	18.25	25,634	✔
Amador	16,836	78.23	4,686	21.77	21,522	✔
Yuba	22,086	76.58	6,756	23.42	28,842	✔
San Benito	18,862	69.18	8,403	30.82	27,265	✔
Siskiyou	14,846	72.60	5,604	27.40	20,450	✔
Lake	17,907	70.17	7,613	29.83	25,520	✔
Lassen	9,130	82.63	1,919	17.37	11,049	✔
Plumas	6,958	71.50	2,773	28.50	9,731	✔
Mariposa	6,593	72.34	2,521	27.66	9,114	✔
Del Norte	7,285	71.42	2,915	28.58	10,200	✔
Glenn	8,026	79.89	2,020	20.11	10,046	✔
Inyo	5,732	67.44	2,768	32.56	8,500	✔
Trinity	3,757	69.83	1,623	30.17	5,380	✔
Colusa	5,323	78.80	1,432	21.20	6,755	✔
Mono	3,474	61.30	2,193	38.70	5,667	✔
Modoc	2,927	75.71	939	24.29	3,866	✔
Sierra	1,183	69.59	517	30.41	1,700	✔
Alpine	392	55.06	320	44.94	712	✔

== Initial impact ==
After the California election results were certified on December 13, 2024, law enforcement agencies, including Sacramento County, Solano County, San Luis Obispo County, San Diego County, Shasta County, Kern County, and San Francisco began arresting and charging people under the new crimes.

== See also ==
- 2024 United States ballot measures
- List of California ballot propositions

== See also ==
- Law and order (politics)
- Penal populism
