= California Proposition 66 =

California Proposition 66 may refer to:

- California Proposition 66 (2004)
- California Proposition 66 (2016)
