= 2008 California Proposition 5 =

California Proposition 5, or the Nonviolent Offender Rehabilitation Act (or NORA), was an initiated state statute that appeared as a ballot measure on the November 2008 ballot in California. It was disapproved by voters on November 4 of that year.

== Provisions of the initiative ==
Proposition 5:

- Requires California to expand and increase funding and oversight for individualized treatment and rehabilitation programs for nonviolent drug offenders and parolees.
- Reduces criminal consequences of nonviolent drug offenses by mandating three-tiered probation with treatment and by providing for case dismissal and/or sealing of records after probation.
- Limits the courts' authority to incarcerate offenders who violate probation or parole.
- Shortens parole for most drug offenses, including sales, and for nonviolent property crimes.
- Creates numerous divisions, boards, commissions, and reporting requirements regarding drug treatment and rehabilitation.
- Changes certain marijuana misdemeanors to infractions.

=== Fiscal impact analysis ===
According to the state of California, the initiative, if it passes, would lead to:

- Increased state costs that could exceed $1 billion annually primarily for expanding drug treatment and rehabilitation programs for offenders in state prisons, on parole, and in the community.
- Savings to the state that could exceed $1 billion annually due primarily to reduced prison and parole operating costs.
- Net savings on a one-time basis on capital outlay costs for prison facilities that could exceed $2.5 billion.
- Unknown net fiscal effect on expenditures for county operations and capital outlay.

== Supporters ==
The official proponent of the measure is Daniel Abrahamson.

=== Argument in favor of Prop 5 ===
Notable arguments that have been made in favor of Prop 5 include:

- Prop 5 would reduce pressure on overcrowded and expensive prisons.
- Prop. 5 creates treatment options for young people with drug problems that do not exist under current law
- Voter-approved Proposition 36 provided treatment, not jail, for nonviolent drug users.
- One-third have completed treatment and became productive, tax-paying citizens.
- Since 2000, Prop. 36 has graduated 84,000 people and saved almost $2 billion."

=== Donors to the Prop 5 campaign ===
As of September 6, 2008, the five largest donors to the "Yes on 5" campaign are:

- George Soros, $1,400,000;
- Jacob Goldfield, $1,400,000.
- Bob Wilson, $700,000;
- John Sperling, $500,000;
- The Drug Policy Alliance Network, $400,000.

=== Path to ballot ===
The petition drive conducted to qualify the measure for the fall ballot was conducted by Progressive Campaigns, Inc. at a cost of about $1.762 million.

== Opposition ==
People Against the Proposition 5 Deception is the official committee against the proposition.

Other opponents include:

- Actor Martin Sheen
- Rational Recovery founder Jack Trimpey

=== Arguments against Prop 5 ===
Notable arguments that have been made against Prop 5 include:

- Proposition 5 has been called the "Drug Dealers’ Bill of Rights" because it shortens parole for methamphetamine dealers and other drug felons from 3 years to 6 months.
- This measure may provide a 'get-out-of-jail-free' card to many of those accused of other crimes by claiming drugs made them do it, letting them effectively escape criminal prosecution."
- Proposition 5 establishes two new bureaucracies with virtually no accountability, and which will cost hundreds of millions in taxpayer dollars.
- This is a long law that changes many statutes that most voters will not even read in sufficient detail
- Addicted defendants will be permitted five violations of probation or treatment failures based on drug use, and judges will be unable to meaningfully intervene until the sixth violation.

=== Donors to no on 5 Campaign ===
As of October 16, 2008, the ten largest donors for 'No on 5' are:

- California Correctional Peace Officers Association, $1,000,000
- Margaret Whitman, $250,000
- A Jerrold Perenchio, $250,000
- Sycuan Band of the Kumeyaay Nation, $175,000
- California Republican Party, $238,000
- Save Our Society From Drugs, $115,000
- Los Angeles Police Protective League, $101,800
- California Beer & Beverage Distributors, $100,000
- California Narcotics Officers Association, $60,000
- Peace Officers Research Association of California, $56,000

=== Lawsuit to remove from ballot ===
Opponents of Proposition 5, including thirty-two district attorneys and former California governors Pete Wilson and Gray Davis, petitioned the California Supreme Court to issue a preemptory writ of mandate to remove Proposition 5 from the November ballot. The lawsuit alleges that Proposition 5 attempts to alter the constitution via statute, which is unconstitutional.

The California Supreme Court declined to issue the preemptory writ. Generally, initiatives' constitutionality are not reviewed until after a vote has passed and the initiative becomes law.

== Newspaper endorsements ==
- The Huffington Post

=== Editorial boards opposed ===
- The Los Angeles Times
- The Pasadena Star News

== Results ==
Electoral results by county.

Proposition 5
Choice	Votes	%
For	5,155,206	40.52
Against	7,566,783	59.48
Total	12,721,989	100.00
Valid votes	12,721,989	92.57
Invalid/blank votes	1,021,188	7.43
Total votes	13,743,177	100.00
Registered voters/turnout		79.42
