= 2014 California Proposition 47 =

Referendum reducing some crimes to misdemeanors

Proposition 47
- November 4, 2014
- Criminal Sentences. Misdemeanor Penalties. Initiative Statute.

Results
Choice	Votes	%
Yes	4,238,156	59.61%
No	2,871,943	40.39%
Valid votes	7,110,099	94.63%
Invalid or blank votes	403,873	5.37%
Total votes	7,513,972	100.00%
County results
For
80%–90%
70%–80%
60%–70%
50%–60%
Against
60%–70%
50%–60%
- Source: California Secretary of State

Proposition 47, also known as the Safe Neighborhoods and Schools Act, was a referendum passed by voters in the state of California on November 4, 2014. It recategorized some nonviolent offenses as misdemeanors rather than felonies, as they had previously been categorized.

The crimes affected were:

- Shoplifting, where the value of property stolen does not exceed $950
- Grand theft, where the value of the stolen property does not exceed $950
- Receiving stolen property, where the value of the property does not exceed $950
- Forgery, where the value of forged check, bond or bill does not exceed $950
- Fraud, where the value of the fraudulent check, draft or order does not exceed $950
- Writing a bad check, where the value of the check does not exceed $950
- Possession of most illegal drugs, below a certain threshold of weight

The proposition was partly repealed by Proposition 36 in 2024.

== Effects ==
In 2010, the California Legislature adopted AB 2372, which made most thefts of a value under $950 misdemeanors, increasing the threshold from $400, which had been in effect since 1982. This was done to keep the definition of felony theft consistent, while adjusting for the effects of inflation. Proposition 47 confirmed this action of the Legislature, and applied it to a few thefts which had not been addressed by the Legislature, primarily auto theft and the theft of some agricultural products. The measure also converted other nonviolent offenses, such as drug offenses, from felonies to misdemeanors.

The measure required that money saved as a result of the measure, would be spent on "school truancy and dropout prevention, victim services, mental health, and drug abuse treatment, and other programs designed to keep offenders out of prison and jail."

The measure included exceptions for offenses involving more than $950 and criminals with records including violence or sex offenses. For example, forgery had previously been a "wobbler" offense that could be charged by the prosecutor as a misdemeanor, or a felony. After the passage of Proposition 47, prosecutors cannot charge a forgery involving less than $950 as a felony, unless the defendant has a prior criminal record.

Proposition 47 was introduced to address prison overcrowding, adopt alternative sentencing methods, and reduce nonviolent offense incarcerations. It reclassified specific offenses – including some theft offenses not previously addressed in AB2372 and certain drug-related charges – as misdemeanors, rather than felonies. It did not eliminate the prosecution of these offenses. Prior to the adoption of AB2372 and the proposition, many instances of shoplifting were treated as misdemeanors. Since most shoplifting cases involve amounts under $400, the enforcement approach did not significantly alter prosecutions before or after the law's enactment.

Proposition 47 affects future convictions, and allows for people currently incarcerated for crimes covered by the measure to petition for re-sentencing.

In November 2015, a report by the Stanford University Justice Advocacy Project authored by the co-author of Proposition 47, found that Proposition 47 had reduced the state's prison population by 13,000 and that it would save the state about $150 million that year.

The provision allowing past offenders to petition for resentencing would have expired on November 4, 2017. Governor Jerry Brown approved a bill that extended the deadline to November 4, 2022.

Contrary to a misconception that circulated on social media, it did not make thefts under $950 no longer criminal offenses, nor would such thefts be left unpunished. To address concerns about organized retail theft, Governor Gavin Newsom signed a law in 2021 that increased flexibility for prosecutors; the legislation permits organized retail theft to be charged as either a misdemeanor or a felony, allowing tailored responses to the issue.

== Support ==
The measure was endorsed by the editorial board of The New York Times, which praised it as a way to reduce overcrowding in the state's prisons. It was endorsed by the editorial board of the Los Angeles Times, which wrote that the measure was a "good and timely measure that can help the state make smarter use of its criminal justice and incarceration resources." The American Civil Liberties Union supported the measure, and donated $3.5 million to support it.

Prominent individual supporters included Jay-Z and Newt Gingrich.

== Opposition ==
Opponents of the measure include Mark A. Peterson, the District Attorney of Contra Costa County, who wrote before its passage that the measure "would make our neighborhoods and schools less safe". It was also criticized by Nancy O'Malley, the District Attorney of Alameda County, who said it would "expose Californians to significant harm" and called it a "Trojan horse".

Among the most prominent arguments made against the law was that possession of the date-rape drug Rohypnol would, like possession of other drugs, be punished as a misdemeanor rather than a felony, which critics described as a "slap on the wrist". Critics also argued that not being able to use incarceration to force drug users into treatment would make it more difficult for drug users to enter into a treatment program.

Efforts are underway to counteract the unintended consequences brought about by Proposition 47. Assemblyman Jim Cooper and Sacramento County District Attorney Anne Marie Schubert advocate for Assembly Bill 16, a ballot initiative to resolve some of these negative effects. If the bill gathers sufficient support, Californian voters can amend the law. This proposed initiative suggests that individuals convicted of a third theft involving property valued at $250 could face felony charges. California's business community has criticized the state's criminal justice policies, particularly Proposition 47, which reclassified certain crimes, like theft of items under $950, from felonies to misdemeanors. (This is based upon a continuing misunderstanding of the effect of Prop. 47. Should the proposition be repealed, the change made by the Legislature in 2010 would still be in effect.) They claim that this adjustment has led to an increase in repeated shoplifting offenses, creating a crisis for retailers, since the adoption of Prop. 47. (Significantly, no such claim was made after the adoption of AB2372 several years prior.) Business leaders believe that the lenient approach has encouraged shoplifters and drug addicts to commit crimes with minimal consequences.

Democratic Assemblymember Rudy Salas of Bakersfield introduced a bill to reverse a significant aspect of Prop. 47 by lowering the felony threshold for petty theft and shoplifting back to $400. Salas argues that Prop. 47's weakening of theft laws has triggered unintended consequences, and believes California voters are prepared to address this issue. Salas's move contrasts with the perspectives of prominent Democrats like Governor Gavin Newsom and Attorney General Rob Bonta, who have downplayed the connection between Prop 47 and the surge in organized retail crime. Salas's bill could resonate with GOP voters, many of whom attribute the rise in theft and crime to Prop. 47. Responding to Salas's bill, Republican state lawmakers proposed repealing Proposition 47, highlighting the ongoing debate and division surrounding the measure's impact on crime and public safety.

== Impact on crime rates ==
In 2015, the Los Angeles Times reported that "law enforcement officials and others have blamed Proposition 47 for allowing repeat offenders...to continue breaking the law with little consequence." Also that year, a spokesman for George Gascón, the district attorney of San Francisco, said that the law "has made it easier for drug offenders to avoid mandated treatment programs." The mayor of Los Angeles, Eric Garcetti, has also suggested that the law may explain why his city's crime rates went from decreasing to increasing.

In a 2015 story in The Washington Post, the police chief of San Diego, Shelley Zimmerman, described Proposition 47 as "a virtual get-out-of-jail-free card." She and other police chiefs also expressed concern about the increasing phenomenon of "frequent fliers" – people who exploit Proposition 47 to commit crimes. For example, one criminal allegedly brought a calculator into a store to avoid stealing more than $950 worth of goods. The ACLU responded by releasing a report saying that those who linked Proposition 47 and crime were "making irresponsible and inaccurate statements."

In November 2015, the director of the Stanford Justice Advocacy Project and co-author of Proposition 47, Michael Romano, said that with respect to Proposition 47, "In the long term, this reallocation of resources should significantly improve public safety". Romano authored a study supporting his conclusion.

A March 2016 report released by the Center on Juvenile and Criminal Justice, concluded that it was still too early to determine whether Proposition 47 had an effect on California's crime rates.

A June 2018 study by the Public Policy Institute of California found evidence that Proposition 47 may have contributed toward an uptick in larceny and auto break-in thefts. The study indicates it found a decline in recidivism and no evidence of an increase in violent crime linked to Proposition 47.

A 2018 study from the University of California, Irvine, maintains that Prop 47 was not a "driver" for recent upticks in crime, based upon comparison of data from 1970 to 2015, in New York, Nevada, Michigan and New Jersey, states that closely matched California's crime trends, but that "what the measure did do was cause less harm and suffering to those charged with crime."

Numerous media outlets have continued to report an increase in retail theft related to the passage of Prop 47. In 2016, large retailers Safeway, Target, Rite Aid and CVS pharmacies reported that shoplifting increased, by from 15% to as much as over 50% in some cases, since voters approved Proposition 47. In 2017, the Los Angeles Times reported that the California Supreme Court ruled that a person convicted of a felony for stealing a car may have that conviction reduced to a misdemeanor if the vehicle was worth no more than $950. In 2018, researchers found that Prop 47 contributed to a jump in car burglaries, shoplifting and other thefts. In 2018, the San Francisco Chronicle reported that Prop. 47 led to a rise in the larceny theft rate by about 9 percent, compared to the 2014 rate.

By 2019, organized retail theft was on the rise. Police and store owners attributed it to Prop 47.

Advocates of Proposition 47 underscored the importance of reallocating funds from incarceration to community-based treatment initiatives to decrease the likelihood of reoffending. Prop 47 dictates that 65% of the financial savings achieved by the state be directed toward mental health and substance use disorder treatment for individuals involved in the criminal justice system. The remaining funds are divided among K–12 schools (25%) and victim services (10%). The initial transfer of savings occurred in 2016, and the programs funded by these grants are relatively recent, making it unlikely for them to have had an immediate impact on recidivism rates.

These grant programs are administered by the Board of State and Community Corrections (BSCC), specifically focusing on mental health services, substance use disorder treatment, and interventions before an individual's arrest or booking into a jail facility. Public agencies are responsible for submitting grant applications. A minimum of half the funds must be allocated to non-governmental community-based organizations. These grants provided by the BSCC span three years, with approximately $104 million distributed from June 2017 to August 2020.

Diverse projects have been funded across various counties, targeting different age groups, types of offenses, and stages within the criminal justice process. These programs involve collaboration between multiple organizations. Although they currently serve a relatively modest number of individuals annually, successful initiatives have the potential to be expanded in the future.

== Efforts to reform or repeal ==
In 2020, Proposition 20 was put on the ballot which, among other changes, would have given prosecutors the ability to charge certain thefts as felonies again. It failed with 38% of the vote.

In November 2024, Proposition 36, called the Homelessness, Drug Addiction and Theft Reduction Act, was placed on the ballot. "2024 California Proposition 36 would undo some of Proposition 47's reduced sentencing, such as theft of items worth $950 or less by a person with two or more past convictions would become a felony under Proposition 36 but is currently a misdemeanor." It passed with 69% of the vote.

== See also ==
- 2000 California Proposition 36
- 2004 California Proposition 66
