= 2004 California Proposition 66 =

Referendum on the three-strikes law

Proposition 66 was a California ballot proposition on the November 2, 2004 ballot. It was a proposed amendment to the California three-strikes law (implemented in 1994 with Proposition 184). Prop 66 would have required the third felony charge against a suspect to be especially violent and/or serious crimes to mandate a 25-years-to-life sentence. It also would have changed the definition of some felonies. It was rejected by voters, with 52.7% voting against the proposition.

Though polls indicated that the measure would be overwhelmingly approved by California voters, public opinion shifted dramatically in the last days of the campaign. Opponents argued that its wording was so ambiguous that it threatened to shorten sentences for far more convicts than proponents estimated, and that it would have categorized some serious felonies—assault with intent to rape an elderly or disabled person, for example—as nonviolent crimes.

Days away from the election, Governor Arnold Schwarzenegger was joined by Henry Nicholas, co-founder and former co-chairman, president and chief executive officer of Broadcom Corporation and a victims’ rights advocate whose sister was murdered in 1983, as well as former Governors Jerry Brown, Pete Wilson, Gray Davis and George Deukmejian in launching an intensive radio and television advertising campaign against the ballot initiative. The ads warned that Prop. 66, if passed, “would release 26,000 dangerous criminals and rapists.

Nicholas contributed $3 million to the campaign and flew former Gov. Brown to Long Beach from Oakland to record radio ads with him in the home recording studio belonging to Ryan Shuck of the rock group Orgy. Joining them was Dave Silvera, of the band Korn. Over the next several days, an ad blitz including spots from Shuck and Silvera blanketed radio stations across the state. At one point ahead in the polls by more than a 3-to-1 margin [6], Prop 66 failed to pass, with 5,604,060 voters (47.3 percent) voting for, 6,238,060 (52.7 percent) voting no, and 747,563 (5.9 percent) casting no vote. Mark DiCamillo, director of the Field Poll, called the come-from-behind campaign to defeat Prop 66 “unprecedented” in California electoral politics.

== Results ==

Proposition 66
| Choice | Votes | % |
|---|---|---|
| For | 5,604,060 | 47.32 |
| Against | 6,238,060 | 52.68 |
| Total | 11,842,120 | 100.00 |
| Valid votes | 11,842,120 | 94.06 |
| Invalid/blank votes | 747,563 | 5.94 |
| Total votes | 12,589,683 | 100.00 |
| Registered voters/turnout | 16,557,273 | 76.04 |

== See also ==
- California Proposition 36 (2000) - a successful amendment to the three-strikes law
- California Proposition 47 (2014) - a successful amendment to the three-strikes law
