= California Beer and Beverage Distributors =

American nonprofit trade association

- Headquarters: Sacramento
- Region served: California
- chairman: Ryan Donaghy
- Website: http://www.cbbd.com/

California Beer and Beverage Distributors (CBBD) is the largest nonprofit trade association representing brewers, distributors, and retailers of beer in the state of California.

== History ==
The CBBD was founded by Adolph Markstein, who also founded the National Beer Wholesalers Association.

== Rockwell Project ==
The CBBD is a sponsor of the Rockwell Project, which is a program using the testimonial of Jim Rockwell to discourage persons below the legal drinking age from using alcohol. Jim Rockwell is a man who, as a teenager, caused an automobile accident while driving under the influence of alcohol.
