= California State Association of Counties =

The California State Association of Counties (CSAC) is a lobbying, advocacy and service organization representing the state's 58 counties at the state and federal level. Areas of focus include the state budget, health-care reform, corrections reform, transportation funding, water and climate change.

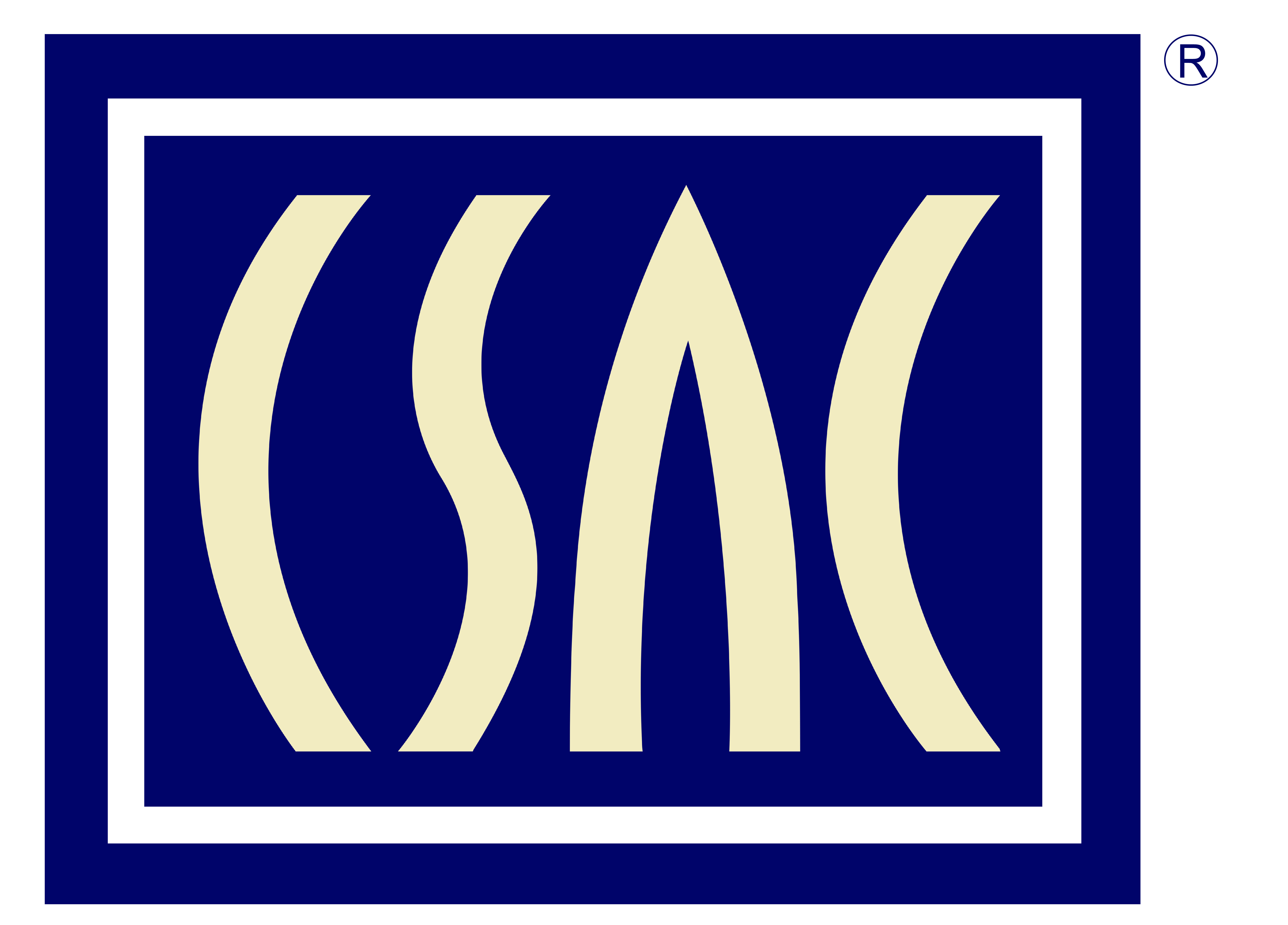
California State Association of Counties Logo

CSAC is governed by a 62-member board of directors and 15-member executive committee, led by Graham Knaus, Chief Executive Officer. Knaus previously served as the Assistant Director of Health and Human Services for Placer County. As of 2010, the organization has an annual operating budget of $8.7 million. The organization's offices are a block from the state's capitol building in Sacramento.

In 2009 during California's budget crisis, the organization pushed for additional funding for counties and helped draft a lawsuit opposing a proposed plan to divert about $4 billion in tax revenues to the state from local governments.

== History ==
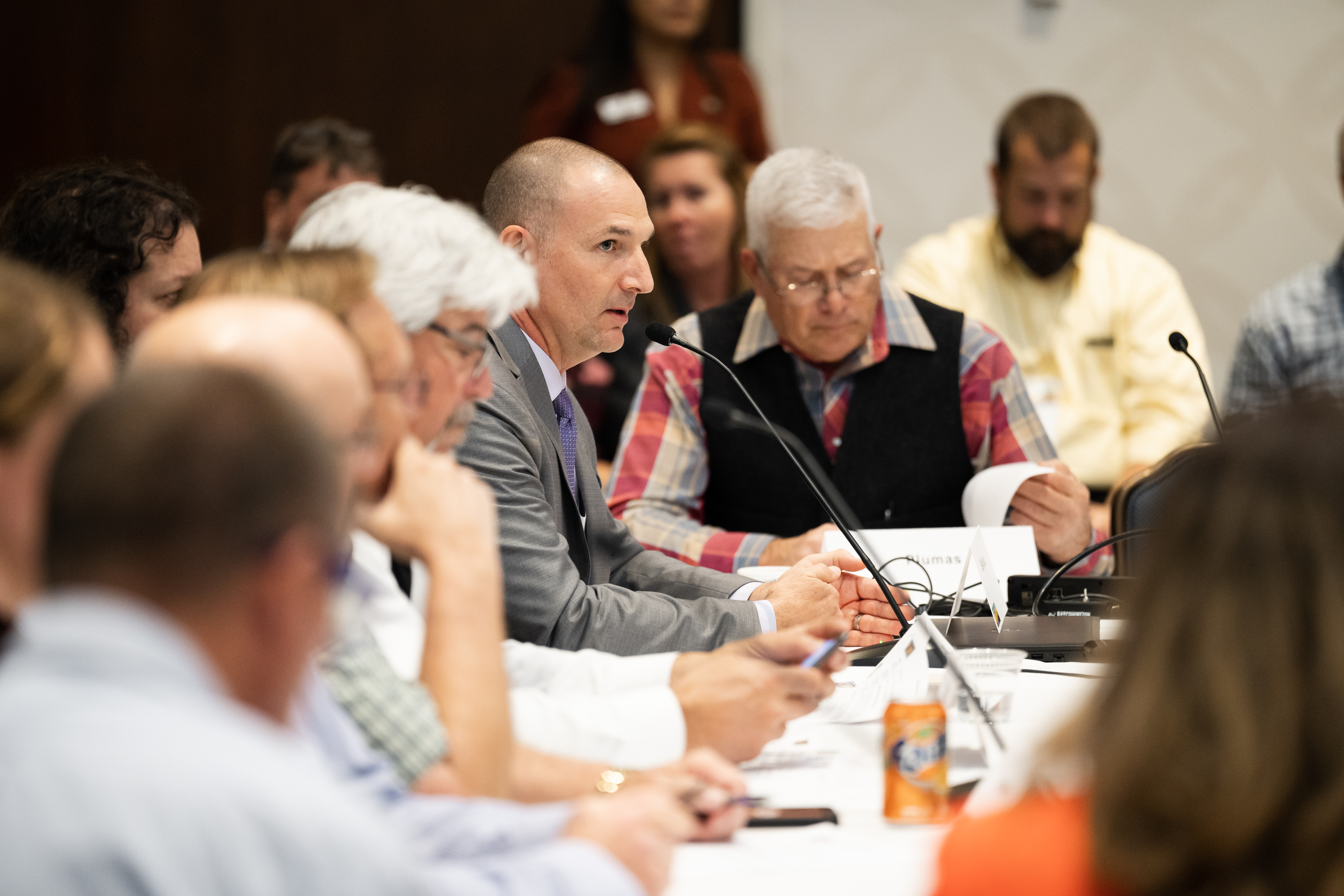
CSAC CEO Graham Knaus speaks to a panel of county officials in 2022.

The organization's origins date back to informal meetings among county supervisors. The County Boards of Supervisors Association of California began meeting in 1895, later becoming the County Supervisors Association of California and then, in 1991, the California State Association of Counties.

CSAC's primary purpose is to represent county government before the California Legislature, administrative agencies, and the federal government. The association also focuses on educating state and federal decision-makers, as well as the public, about the value and necessity of county programs and services.

In 1986, CSAC expanded its services by forming the CSAC Finance Corporation. This subsidiary was created to provide a broad array of finance, investment, insurance, and public services to benefit California counties and related public agencies. Since its inception, the CSAC Finance Corporation has grown to become a premier provider of various cost-saving programs and services to counties and other local governments throughout California.

The following year, in 1987, the CSAC Finance Corporation, in collaboration with the League of California Cities, established the California Statewide Communities Development Authority (CSCDA). This joint powers authority offers a wide range of financial products and services.

The organization now offers programs related to cyber security, cannabis data management, and property tax payment platforms, among others.

== County caucuses ==
The California State Association of Counties (CSAC) organizes its member counties into three distinct caucuses: urban, suburban, and rural. Each county has the authority to determine which caucus most accurately represents its jurisdiction. This categorization enables counties to align with peers that share similar characteristics and challenges, facilitating more effective representation and advocacy before the California Legislature, administrative agencies, and the federal government.

As of October 2024, CSAC's member counties are categorized into the following caucuses:

Urban Caucus:

- Alameda
- Contra Costa
- Fresno
- Los Angeles
- Orange
- Riverside
- Sacramento
- San Bernardino
- San Diego
- San Francisco
- San Joaquin
- San Mateo
- Santa Clara
- Ventura

Suburban Caucus:

- Butte
- Imperial
- Kern
- Marin
- Merced
- Monterey
- Napa
- Placer
- San Luis Obispo
- Santa Barbara
- Santa Cruz
- Solano
- Sonoma
- Stanislaus
- Tulare
- Yolo

Rural Caucus:

- Alpine
- Amador
- Calaveras
- Colusa
- Del Norte
- El Dorado
- Glenn
- Humboldt
- Inyo
- Kings
- Lake
- Lassen
- Madera
- Mariposa
- Mendocino
- Modoc
- Mono
- Nevada
- Plumas
- San Benito
- Sierra
- Siskiyou
- Shasta
- Sutter
- Tehama
- Trinity
- Tuolumne
- Yuba

== Related organizations ==
The CSAC has founded or co-founded the following organizations:

- The CSAC Finance Corporation provides municipal finance services to counties and private entities that serve county residents.
- The CSAC Institute for Excellence in County Government provides continuing education for county elected officials and senior staff; co-presents courses with the University of Southern California, California State University, Sacramento and the Institute for Local Government.
- The California Statewide Communities Development Authority, which provides bond negotiations and other services to counties and cities.

The CSAC is also closely affiliated with the County Engineers Association of California.
