= Tom Ammiano =

American politician and LGBT rights activist

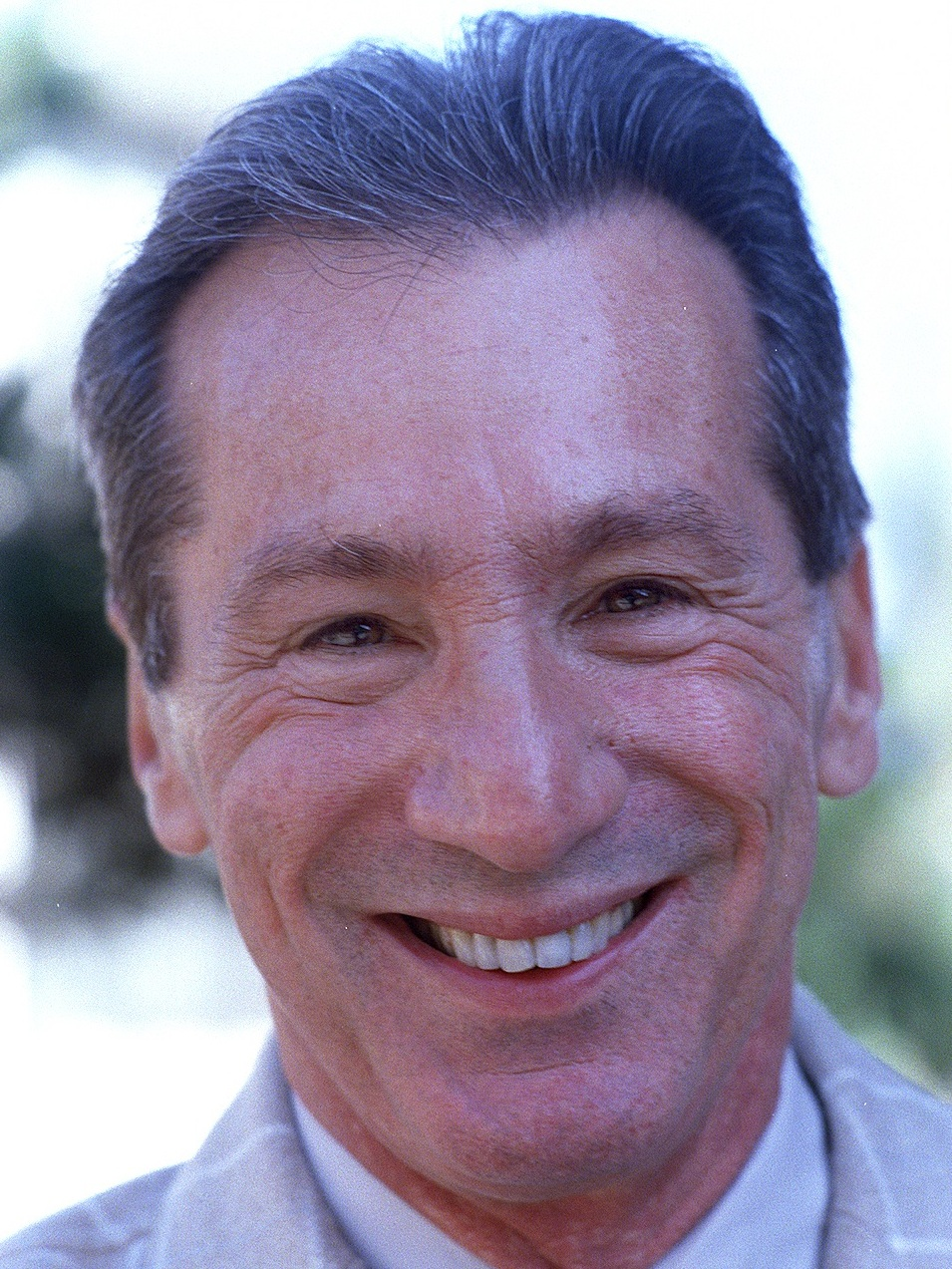
- Amminano in 1999

Member of the California State Assembly
- In office December 1, 2008 – November 30, 2014
- Preceded by: Mark Leno
- Succeeded by: David Chiu
- Constituency: 13th district (2008–2012); 17th district (2012–2014)

Member of the San Francisco Board of Supervisors
- In office January 8, 1995 – December 1, 2008
- Preceded by: Multi-member district
- Succeeded by: David Campos
- Constituency: At-large district (1995–2001); 9th district (2001–2008)

Personal details
- Born: December 15, 1941 (age 84) Montclair, New Jersey, U.S.
- Party: Democratic
- Domestic partner: Tim Curbo (deceased) Carolis Deal (current)
- Children: 1
- Education: Seton Hall University; San Francisco State University
- Occupation: Politician
- Profession: Teacher, activist

Tom Ammiano (born December 15, 1941) is an American politician and LGBT rights activist from San Francisco, California. Ammiano, a member of the California Legislative LGBT Caucus, served as a member of the California State Assembly from 2008 to November 30, 2014. He had previously been a member of the San Francisco Board of Supervisors and had mounted an unsuccessful bid for mayor of San Francisco in 1999. He was succeeded as California's Assemblyman for District 17 by San Francisco Board of Supervisors President David Chiu on December 1, 2014.

== Early life and education ==
Ammiano grew up in Montclair, New Jersey, part of a working-class family of Italian Americans. He attended Immaculate Conception High School, graduating in 1959. Ammiano competed successfully on the school's track team and earned a varsity letter that he never received, apparently because he was perceived to be gay, an experience that he described as "humiliating". After discussing the long-time slight on the radio in 2020 while being interviewed about his book Kiss My Gay Ass, a listener reached out to the school and pleaded his case "in the interest of healing old wounds". After confirming his qualifications with a former coach and a team captain, the school relented in 2021 and sent him a letter to mark his accomplishments.

Ammiano attended Seton Hall University, earning a bachelor's degree in communication in 1963. Hoping to leave New Jersey as far as possible in the distance he moved to San Francisco in 1963, and earned a master's degree in special education from San Francisco State University in 1965. Ammiano was opposed to the Vietnam War and from 1966 to 1968 was an English teacher in a small town in South Vietnam, serving with a Quaker development group.

== Career in comedy ==
In 1980, Ammiano began to perform stand-up comedy. In 1982, Ammiano, along with Hank Wilson and Ron Lanza, also schoolteachers and activists, began gay stand-up nights at the Valencia Rose Cafe. He told Ed Karvoski in the book, A Funny Time To Be Gay, "I suggested to Ron and Hank that we do gay comedy there. They said, 'What's gay comedy?' I said, 'I don't know. All I know is I go to straight comedy clubs and I try to be funny, and I talk about being gay and they want to eat my liver! I need a place to develop.'" His moniker was "Mother of Gay Comedy."

== Political activism and career ==
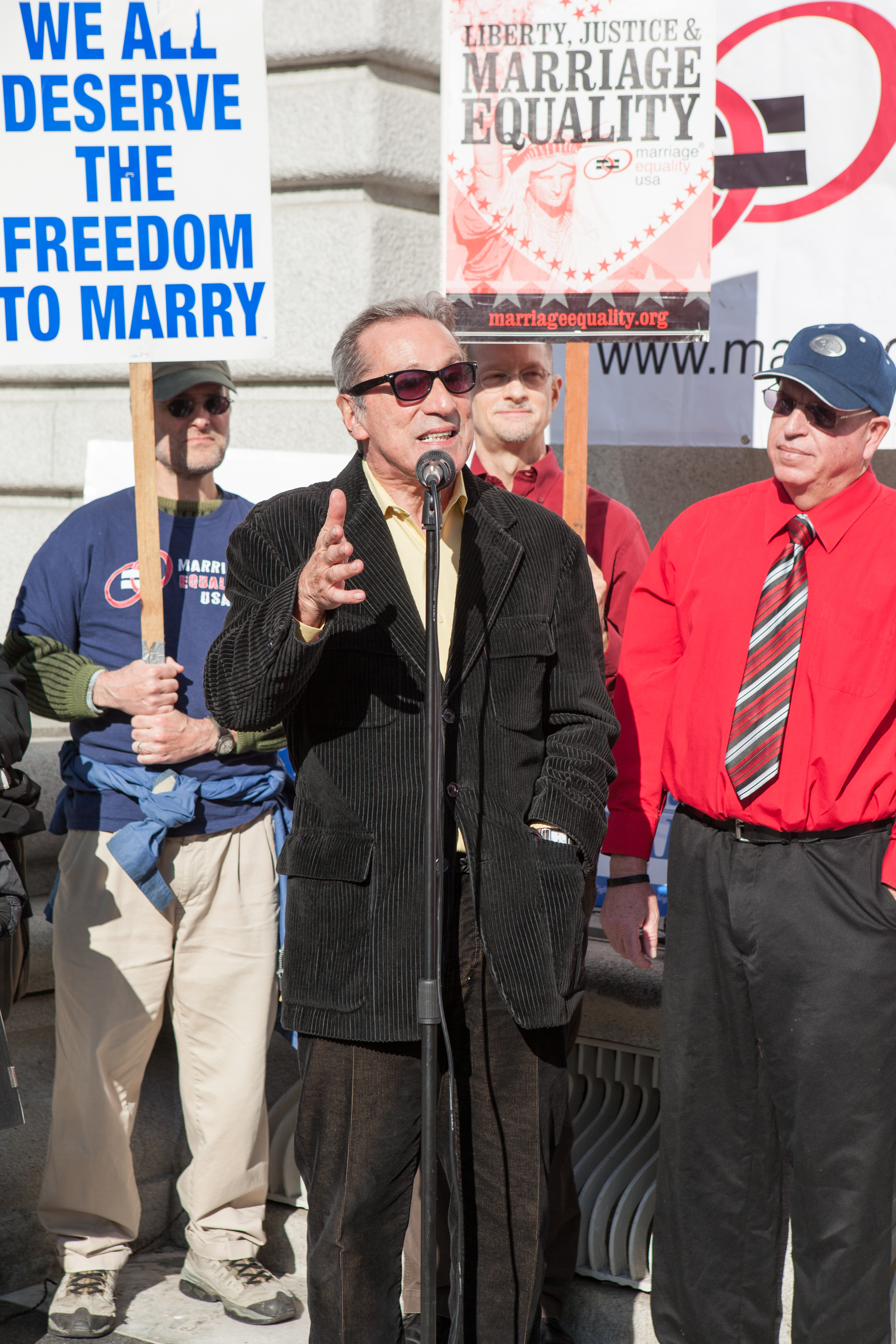
Ammiano speaks at a marriage equality rally outside the James R. Browning United States Court of Appeals Building in San Francisco, December 2011.

=== Briggs Initiative ===
In 1977, Ammiano, with activists Hank Wilson and Harvey Milk, co-founded "No on 6" against the Briggs Initiative, which would have banned any gay person from teaching in California. The movement achieved success the following year, in 1978.

=== San Francisco Board of Education ===
After returning to San Francisco, Ammiano was a special-education teacher at Buena Vista Elementary School in the Mission. In 1975, he was one of the founders of the Gay Teachers Caucus which successfully pushed the school board to prohibit discrimination based on sexual orientation. Ammiano also came out publicly as a gay man in a news conference that year, and became one of the first public-school teachers in San Francisco to do so.

In 1980 and 1988, Ammiano ran for the San Francisco Board of Education, and was elected in 1990. He was subsequently elected its vice-president in 1991, and then president in 1992. As president of the Board of Education, Ammiano was successful in his efforts to include a gay and lesbian sensitivity curriculum for all students in the San Francisco Unified School District.

=== San Francisco Board of Supervisors ===
Among his accomplishments on the Board of Supervisors is the creation of the San Francisco Health Care Security Ordinance, which was passed by a unanimous vote of the Board of Supervisors and signed by Mayor Gavin Newsom on August 7, 2006. This made San Francisco the first city in the nation to provide universal healthcare access. Ammiano was the co-author (with Susan Leal and Leslie Rachel Katz) of the city's Equal Benefits Ordinance, which provides equal benefits to employees and their unmarried domestic partners. It requires companies which do business with the City and County of San Francisco to provide the same benefits.

In 1999, Ammiano came into conflict with San Francisco's Roman Catholic community when the Board of Supervisors, at Ammiano's request, granted the Sisters of Perpetual Indulgence, a charity group of drag queen nuns, a street-closure permit for Castro Street for their 20th anniversary celebration on Easter Sunday.

=== 1999 mayoral campaign ===
In the San Francisco mayoral race of 1999, Ammiano mounted a successful write-in campaign in the November election, preventing the incumbent Willie Brown from achieving a victory without a run-off. While Ammiano lost that second election in December, Ammiano's campaign galvanized more radical voters in San Francisco, and had a major impact on the composition of the new, more liberal Board of Supervisors the next year. There is a documentary about the 1999 mayoral election, titled See How They Run.

=== California State Assembly ===
==== Marijuana law reform efforts ====
Ammiano introduced Marijuana Control, Regulation, and Education Act, to the California State Assembly. The bill, introduced by Ammiano in February 2009, calling for the legalization of cannabis statewide and provided for regulation of marijuana like alcohol, with people over 21 years old allowed to grow, buy, sell and possess cannabis. With the state's severe budget shortfalls the bill was discussed in light of revenue generation as well as savings from decriminalizing and prosecuting marijuana-focused possession crimes. The bill failed the assembly's Public Safety committee by a 3–4 vote on January 12, 2010.

Ammiano introduced a bill in a subsequent Assembly to create a new statewide entity within the Department of Alcoholic Beverage Control to regulate and license medical marijuana in California, arguing that a patchwork of local regulations had led to the proliferation of both "legitimate and illegitimate operations" in the state. The bill failed by a 27–30 vote, with 22 not voting, in May 2014.

==== A.B. 1266 ====
Ammiano authored legislation, the School Success and Opportunity Act (Assembly Bill No. 1266), which "requires that a pupil be permitted to participate in sex-segregated school programs, activities, including athletic teams and competitions, and use facilities consistent with their gender identity, irrespective of the gender listed on the pupil's records."

The legislation passed the California State Legislature in June 2013 and was signed into law by Governor Jerry Brown in August 2013. The legislation went into effect on January 1, 2014. The bill was opposed by the California Catholic Conference, which viewed the law as unnecessary.

A group of activists made an attempt to repeal the law through a California ballot initiative, but in February 2014, the effort failed after it fell "about 17,000 signatures short of the 504,760 valid names needed to go before voters."

=== Schwarzenegger acrostic memo ===
In October 2009, Governor Arnold Schwarzenegger appeared at a Democratic Party fundraiser at San Francisco's Fairmont Hotel. When former San Francisco Mayor Willie Brown introduced the governor, Ammiano shouted "You lie!" in a copy-cat of Representative Joe Wilson's remarks during President Obama's congressional address a month earlier. Ammiano walked out yelling that Schwarzenegger could "kiss my gay ass". In a video of the event, an audience member is heard yelling "Kiss my faggot ass!" at Schwarzenegger, leading some to conclude that "faggot" was what Ammiano actually said, and that "gay ass" was a censored version of the quote. However, Ammiano did not use the word "faggot", and the person yelling "kiss my faggot ass" was someone else.

Four days after the fundraiser, Schwarzenegger vetoed Assembly Bill 1176, which was authored by Ammiano to help the port of San Francisco with financing issues, and had cleared the State Senate 40–0 and the Assembly 78–0. Schwarzenegger sent a memo to the California State Assembly explaining the veto. The letter contained a hidden message in an acrostic poem, with the first letter of each line along the left margin spelling out 'fuck you'. Governor Schwarzenegger denied the hidden message was inserted intentionally, but media outlets consulted a mathematics professor, who reportedly determined that the odds that it was simply a coincidence were astronomical. In an October 30, 2019, appearance on The Late, Late Show with James Corden, Schwarzenegger admitted that he had intentionally added the message and had lied about not knowing the message was in the memo.

== Personal life ==
Ammiano's partner of many years was Tim Curbo, a fellow schoolteacher. Curbo died of complications from AIDS in 1994, days before Ammiano was elected supervisor.

Ammiano portrayed himself in a paid cameo appearance in the film Milk (2008), reenacting one of his protests of the Briggs Initiative.
