= Jeffrey Miron =

American economist

- Born: January 31, 1957 (age 69); Detroit, Michigan, U.S.

Academic background
- Education: Swarthmore College (BA); Massachusetts Institute of Technology (PhD)
- Doctoral advisor: Stanley Fischer

Academic work
- Discipline: Economics
- School or tradition: Libertarian economics
- Institutions: Boston University; Harvard University
- Website: Information at IDEAS / RePEc

Jeffrey Alan "Jeff" Miron (/ˈmaɪrən/; born January 31, 1957) is an American economist. He served as the chairman of the department of economics at Boston University from 1992 to 1998, and currently teaches at Harvard University, serving as a senior lecturer and director of undergraduate studies in Harvard's economics department. Miron holds the position of director of economic policy studies at the Cato Institute.

== Early life and education ==
Miron was born in Detroit, Michigan, on January 31, 1957. His mother was born in Windsor, Ontario, and as a result he is a dual Canadian citizen.

Miron graduated magna cum laude from Swarthmore College with a Bachelor of Arts in economics and mathematics in 1979, then earned his Ph.D. in economics with a specialization in game theory from the Massachusetts Institute of Technology (MIT) in 1984. Miron's doctoral dissertation, completed under economist Stanley Fischer, was titled, "The Economics of Seasonal Time Series."

== Career ==
Miron is an outspoken libertarian. He was one of the 166 economists to sign a letter to congressional leaders in opposition to the bailout plan put forth by the U.S. federal government in response to the 2008 financial crisis. He advocated that those companies that floundered during the crisis should be bankrupt instead of receiving government help. He has proposed three policy reforms to help the US economy recover from the 2008 financial crisis: cutting entitlements, freezing regulation, and replacing the existing tax code with a flat tax on consumption. Miron has also spoken out against the Patient Protection and Affordable Care Act, arguing that it is economically unfeasible and will increase the US deficit; instead, he suggests limiting government intervention is the best way to lower overall health care costs and make health care accessible to the most people. He has studied the effects of drug criminalization for 15 years, and argues that all drugs should be legalized. He also supports the legalization of sex work. Miron is pro-choice as well. He supports open borders, arguing that the United States should impose "no immigration restrictions at all." He opposes foreign interventions because "they cost far more than initially acknowledged while failing to help either America or the target countries."

Miron has been a cast member of documentaries such as The Culture High and The Union: The Business Behind Getting High.

== Writings ==
- Casebook for Use With Macroeconomics. Institute of Electrical & Electronics Engineers. 1992. ISBN 978-0-87901-597-8.
- The Economics of Seasonal Cycles. The MIT Press. 1996. ISBN 978-0-262-13323-4.
- Drug War Crimes: The Consequences of Prohibition. Independent Institute. 2004. ISBN 978-0-945999-90-4.
- Libertarianism, from A to Z. Basic Books. 2010. ISBN 978-0-465-01943-4.
