= California Correctional Peace Officers Association =

CCPOA
- California Correctional Peace Officers Association
- Founded: 1957
- Location: United States
- Members: 31,000
- Key people: Neil Flood, President
- Website: www.ccpoa.org

The California Correctional Peace Officers Association (CCPOA), founded in 1957 as the California Correctional Officers Association (CCOA), is the corrections officers' labor union in California. CCPOA made the largest contribution to the No on 5 Campaign in 2008, contributing one million dollars. CCPOA president Don Novey established the union's tradition of forming close alliances and friendships with political leaders during the 1980s.

== Mission ==
The mission of the CCPOA is to "promote and enhance the correctional profession, protect the safety of those engaged in corrections and advocate for the laws, funding and policies needed to improve prison operations and protect public safety."

== Membership ==
The CCPOA union members currently pay $90.70 per month to the union. As of 2017, the union had 39,750 members, at which time union dues totaled $3,605,325 per year.

== History ==
In the 1950s, an officer, despondent over working conditions at San Quentin State Prison, committed suicide. This prompted Officer Al Mello and eight fellow officers, five of which were Correctional Lieutenants concerned with the pay scale and working conditions, to start traveling to the three existing state prisons (Folsom, Soledad, and San Quentin) to rally support for the creation of a union dedicated to representing the correctional officer series. In 1957, the California Correctional Officers Association (CCOA) was formed with members from each adult institution. Almost immediately, law enforcement officers from the California Youth Authority, Youth and Adult Paroles, and Medical Technical Assistants began to inquire about membership.

Until the 1980s, unionized prison guards were relatively weak politically in California, with membership divided between the California State Employees Association and the CCOA. Don Novey led a successful effort during the 1980s to combine California Youth Authority supervisors and parole officers with prison guards, launching the CCPOA's rise to prominence. The CCPOA's membership increased substantially. Novey was an aggressive lobbyist and helped bring the union to a position of great influence in Sacramento politics, eventually becoming one of the most powerful unions in the state.

By 1992, the CCPOA was California's second largest political action committee, contributing over a million dollars to legislative candidates. The CCPOA also contributed over a million dollars to Pete Wilson's successful 1990 gubernatorial campaign, the largest independent campaign contribution on behalf of a candidate in California history. The CCPOA subsequently backed Gray Davis's successful campaign for governorship in 1998.

The CCPOA has supported campaigns for tougher criminal sentences, including large contributions to the 1994 campaign for Proposition 184, the 'three strikes' ballot initiative, which puts repeat offenders behind bars for lengthy terms.

== Political activity ==
The CCPOA is deeply involved in a variety of political activities. Most spending is done through political action committees. Although its membership is relatively small, representing only about one tenth the membership of the California Teachers Association, CCPOA political activity routinely exceeds that of all other labor unions in California. The union spends heavily on influencing political campaigns, and on lobbying legislators and other government officials. CCPOA also hires public relations firms and political polling firms.

As calls for reform of the state's prison system escalated during 2006, putting pressure on former governor Arnold Schwarzenegger to take a more aggressive stance on reform.

=== Lobbying ===
Lobbying efforts and campaign contributions by the CCPOA have helped secure passage of numerous legislative bills favorable to union members, including bills that increase prison terms, member pay, and enforce current drug laws. The CCPOA takes the position that correctional officers perform an essential public service that work in great danger, and strives for a safer California.

=== Political action committees ===
CCPOA has many political action committees, according to a report in the Los Angeles Times.

== See also ==
- California Department of Corrections and Rehabilitation
- List of United States state prisons
