= 2000 California Proposition 36 =

Proposition 36
- November 7, 2000
- Substance Abuse and Crime Prevention Act of 2000

Results
Choice	Votes	%
Yes	6,233,422	60.86%
No	4,009,508	39.14%
Valid votes	10,242,930	91.92%
Invalid or blank votes	899,913	8.08%
Total votes	11,142,843	100.00%
Registered voters/turnout	15,707,307	70.94%
- County results For 50%–60% 60%–70% 70%–80% Against 50%–60%

California Proposition 36, the Substance Abuse and Crime Prevention Act of 2000, was an initiative statute that permanently changed state law to allow qualifying defendants convicted of non-violent drug possession offenses to receive a probationary sentence in lieu of incarceration. As a condition of probation defendants are required to participate in and complete a licensed and/or certified community drug treatment program. If the defendant fails to complete this program or violates any other term or condition of their probation, then probation can be revoked and the defendant may be required to serve an additional sentence which may include incarceration.

The proposition was passed with 6,233,422 (60.86%) votes in favor and 4,009,508 (39.14%) against on November 7, 2000 and went into effect on July 1, 2001 with $120 million for treatment services allocated annually for five years. The act is codified in sections 1210 and 3063.1 of the California Penal Code and Division 10.8 of the California Health and Safety Code.

== Results ==

Proposition 36
Choice	Votes	%
For	6,233,422	60.86
Against	4,009,508	39.14
Total	10,242,930	100.00
Valid votes	10,242,930	91.92
Invalid/blank votes	899,913	8.08
Total votes	11,142,843	100.00
Registered voters/turnout	15,707,307	70.94

== Qualified Defendants ==
Not all defendants convicted of a non-violent drug possession offense are eligible for probation and treatment under Prop 36. Subdivision (b) of section 1210.1 of the California Penal Code deems the following defendants ineligible for the program:

1. Any defendant who has been incarcerated within the last five years for a serious or violent felony offense.
2. Any defendant convicted in the same proceeding of a non-drug related misdemeanor or any felony.
3. Any defendant who, during the commission of the offense, was in possession of a firearm.
4. Any defendant who refuses treatment.
5. Any defendant who has two separate drug related convictions, has participated in Prop 36 twice before, and who is found by the court by clear and convincing evidence to be unamenable to any and all forms of available drug treatment. In such cases the defendant shall be sentenced to 30 days in jail.

== Reform ==
Former Governor Arnold Schwarzenegger was critical of Proposition 36 because many in the program fail to complete treatment. About 34 percent of drug offenders complete treatment. Schwarzenegger attempted to modify the proposition by enacting Senate Bill 1137. The bill would have given judges the power to sentence jail time for a brief period to drug offenders who relapsed. Proposition 36 supporters objected to the changes and an Alameda County court ordered an injunction on the reforms. Senate Bill 1137 did not go into effect..

== Criticism ==
Prop 36 is not retroactive, meaning that defendants who had to attend unlicensed drug rehabs prior to Prop 36 and the Drug Courts are not afforded the opportunity to have their cases reheard in court. Prop 36 and the Drug Courts have discontinued the use of unlicensed rehabs as sentencing tools, due to concerns that unlicensed treatment could be unethical. Many drug offenders who had used use unlicensed rehabs had been abused and are unable to appeal past convictions due to the formation of the Drug Courts. Unlicensed rehabs are no longer used, but people who relied on them are not afforded any of Prop 36's protection. If Prop 36's benefits had been extended retroactively, these people would have received them; at present, they do not.

== Evaluation ==
The University of California, Los Angeles, which was chosen to run the required evaluation of Proposition 36, has issued three annual reports on the implementation and impact of the program since 2003. These reports provide data and analysis that help state legislators determine the future of the program each year. A UCLA study released in April 2006 showed Proposition 36 is saving taxpayers $2.50 for every $1 invested. According to the Drug Policy Alliance, total savings for taxpayers over the past five years total $1.4 billion. Another UCLA study found that convicted drug users had become more likely to be arrested on new drug charges since the proposition took effect .

== See also ==
- Cannabis in California
- Drug policy of California
- California Proposition 66 (2004), a failed amendment to the three-strikes law
