= 2024 San Francisco District Attorney election =

- November 5, 2024
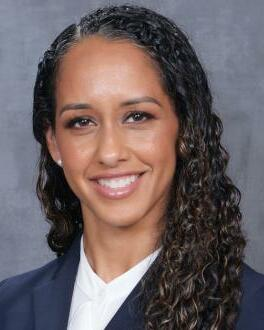

Candidate	Brooke Jenkins	Ryan Khojasteh
Popular vote	227,924	117,753
Percentage	65.94%	34.06%
- Results by precinct Jenkins: 50–60% 60–70% 70–80% 80-90% Khojasteh: 50–60% Tie: 50% No votes
District Attorney before election
Brooke Jenkins
Elected District Attorney
Brooke Jenkins

The 2024 San Francisco District Attorney election was held on November 5, 2024, concurrent with the election for San Francisco mayor and the 2024 statewide general elections.

Incumbent District Attorney Brooke Jenkins was originally appointed to the position in 2022 by mayor London Breed after the successful recall of her predecessor Chesa Boudin. That year, Jenkins was elected to serve out the remaining two years of Boudin's term with 53.7% of the vote. Jenkins successfully ran for re-election to a full term in office.

== Candidates ==
=== Declared ===
- Brooke Jenkins, incumbent district attorney
- Ryan Khojasteh, Alameda County deputy district attorney, former San Francisco assistant district attorney, and candidate for California's 12th congressional district in 2018

=== Declined ===
- Chesa Boudin, former district attorney

== Endorsements ==
Ryan Khojasteh

U.S. Representatives

- Mike Honda, former U.S. Representative

Statewide officials

- Delaine Eastin, former California State Superintendent of Public Instruction

State legislators

- Tom Ammiano, former state assemblyman
- Mark Leno, former state senator

County officials

- George Gascón, Los Angeles County District Attorney and former San Francisco District Attorney

Local officials

- James Coleman, mayor of South San Francisco

Organizations

- California Young Democrats
- Harvey Milk LGBTQ Democratic Club

== Results ==
2024 San Francisco District Attorney election
Candidate	Votes	%
Brooke Jenkins (incumbent)	227,924	65.94%
Ryan Khojasteh	117,753	34.06%
Total votes	345,677	100%
