= 2022 San Francisco District Attorney recall election =

- June 7, 2022
- Shall Chesa Boudin be recalled (removed) from the office of District Attorney?

Results
Choice	Votes	%
Yes	122,588	55.03%
No	100,177	44.97%
Valid votes	222,765	96.96%
Invalid or blank votes	6,995	3.04%
Total votes	229,760	100.00%
Registered voters/turnout	495,498	46.37%
Results by precinct
Yes (for recall): 50–60% 60–70% 70–80% 80–90%	No (against recall): 50–60% 60–70% 70–80% >90%	Tie No votes
District Attorney before election
Chesa Boudin
Appointed District Attorney
Brooke Jenkins

The 2022 San Francisco District Attorney recall election was a successful special recall election to remove San Francisco District Attorney Chesa Boudin from office. It was held on June 7, 2022, concurrent with the 2022 statewide primary elections.

In the recall election, 55% of voters supported Boudin's removal, successfully removing him from office. Mayor London Breed, who had backed a more moderate Democrat in the 2019 district attorney race, appointed Brooke Jenkins as Boudin's replacement on July 8, 2022.

The successful recall reflected voter frustration with quality of life street conditions such as homelessness, substance abuse, property crime, violence against Asian Americans, and mental illness. Journalists and opinion writers speculated that voters nationwide had become less supportive of criminal justice reform and wanted more focus on public safety, with implications for the November midterm elections.

== Background ==
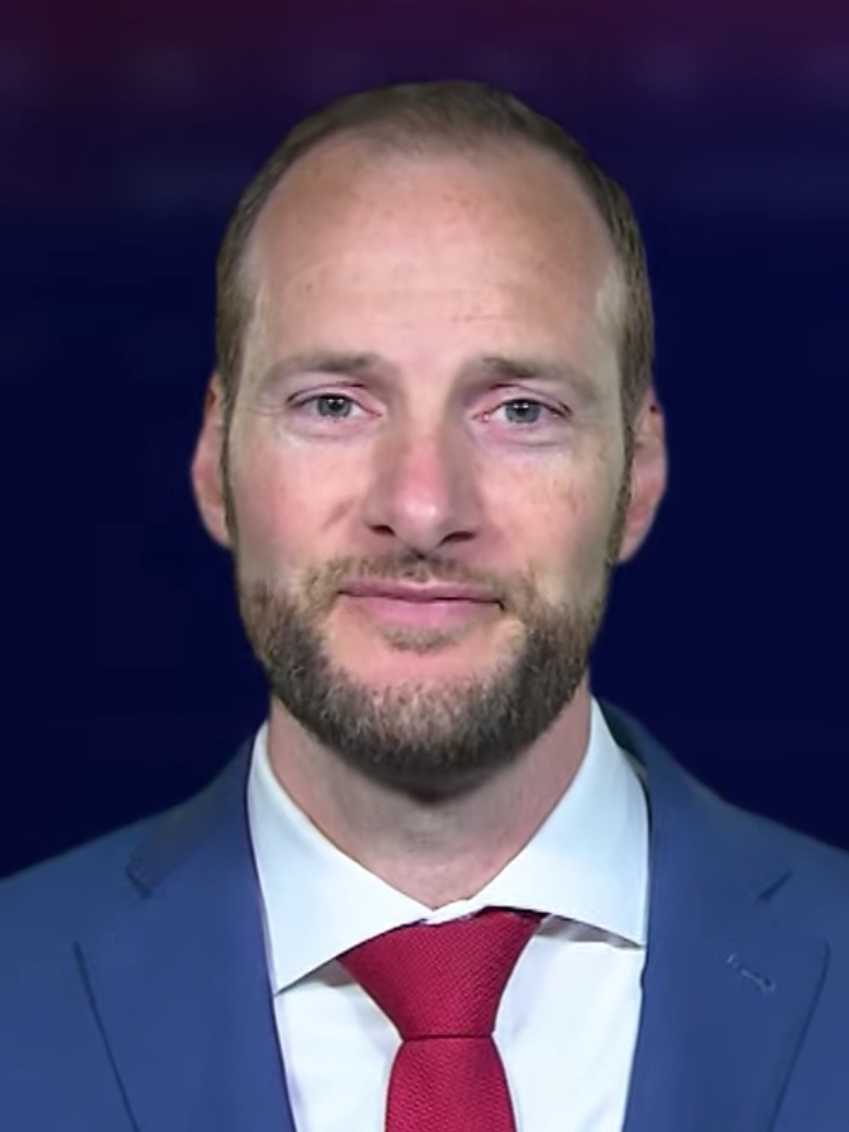
Boudin in 2019

Boudin was elected San Francisco district attorney in the 2019 election on a progressive platform, narrowly defeating interim district attorney Suzy Loftus in a ranked voting race. Boudin campaigned for the office on a decarceration platform of eliminating cash bail, establishing a unit to re-evaluate wrongful convictions and refusing to assist Immigration and Customs Enforcement (ICE) with raids and arrests.

In the following year, during the COVID-19 pandemic lockdowns, there was significant media coverage of the increased visibility of homelessness and drug use, increased car burglaries, and videos of brazen thefts of high end stores and Walgreens drugstores shared on social media. Walgreens shut down a number of stores citing organized theft. Media put a spotlight on crime in San Francisco as crime patterns shifted drastically with increases in auto theft and burglary. Several Asian seniors were also attacked and there were fears of anti-Asian crime.

Boudin was accused of being soft on prosecuting criminals and not keeping potentially harmful people in jail. Boudin was also criticized in several high-profile cases for releasing suspects with a history of previous convictions who then went on to commit further crimes. By May 2021, Boudin had become the target of two recall campaigns.

=== Context ===
The recall election was held within months of two other high-profile recall elections in California: the unsuccessful recall of Gavin Newsom in September 2021, and a successful recall of three San Francisco Board of Education members in February 2022. In addition, a recall effort was underway against Los Angeles County District Attorney George Gascón. Boudin's election in 2019 and Gascón's victory over incumbent Jackie Lacey in 2020 were considered "landmark moments in the nationwide 'progressive prosecutor' movement".

=== Recall petition ===
In the summer of 2021, there were two separate campaigns that sought to gather the necessary signatures in order to force a recall election against Boudin. The first campaign was spearheaded by former mayoral candidate Richie Greenberg, a member of the Republican Party, but narrowly fell short of the 51,325 signatures needed before the August 11 deadline. The second campaign was led by Mary Jung and Andrea Shorter, both members of the Democratic Party, and had a deadline of October 25 to collect the same number of signatures. Jung is a former chair of the San Francisco Democratic County Central Committee. The second campaign submitted 83,484 signatures to the Board of Elections, which announced on November 9 that via a review of a representative 5% sample of signatures they determined that the number of valid signatures exceeded the required 51,325 and thus that a recall election would take place on June 7, 2022.

=== Reactions and public sentiment ===
Boudin repeatedly dismissed the recall attempt as being led by the Republican Party. The political action committee (PAC) Neighbors for a Better San Francisco had contributed $4.7 million to the campaign, around 80% of the recall campaign's total contributions. William Oberndorf, the top donor to the Neighbors PAC in 2021, had contributed more than $900,000 to the PAC. Oberndorf also donated $1.5 million to a Republican Party PAC in 2020.

Despite Boudin's claims, the recall campaign was publicly led by Democrats. 83% of donors to the campaign were from Democratic-registered voters or no-party-preference voters, with over 80% of donations coming from local San Franciscans. A February 2022 poll commissioned by the recall campaign indicated that two-thirds of Democrats were in favor of the recall. Meanwhile, on February 24, 2022, the San Francisco Democratic County Central Committee voted by a margin of 20–2 to oppose the recall effort. The two committee members supporting the recall were Suzy Loftus and Nancy Tung; both were candidates in the 2019 district attorney election won by Boudin.

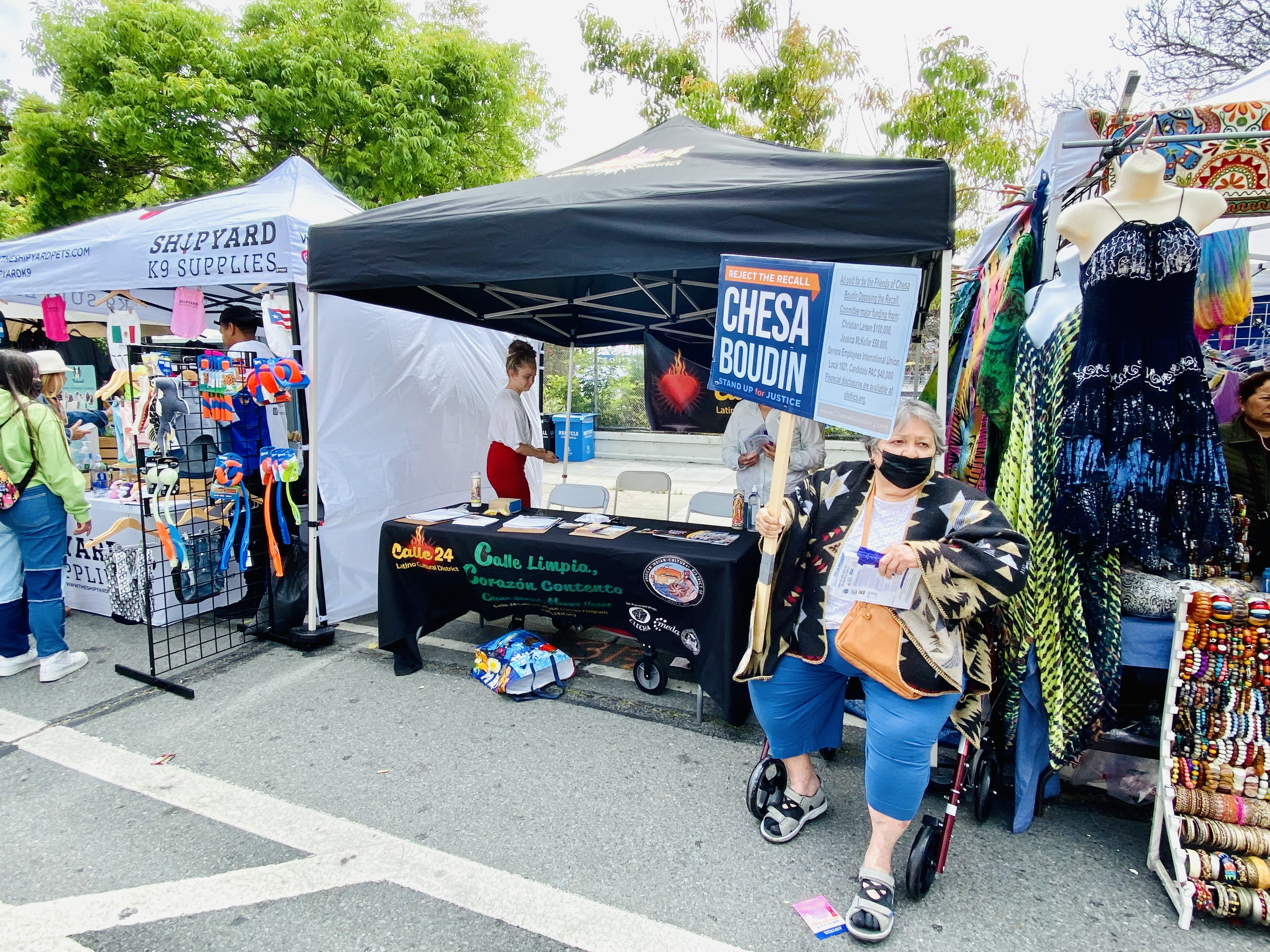
Woman with a sign opposing the recall at 2022 Carnaval San Francisco

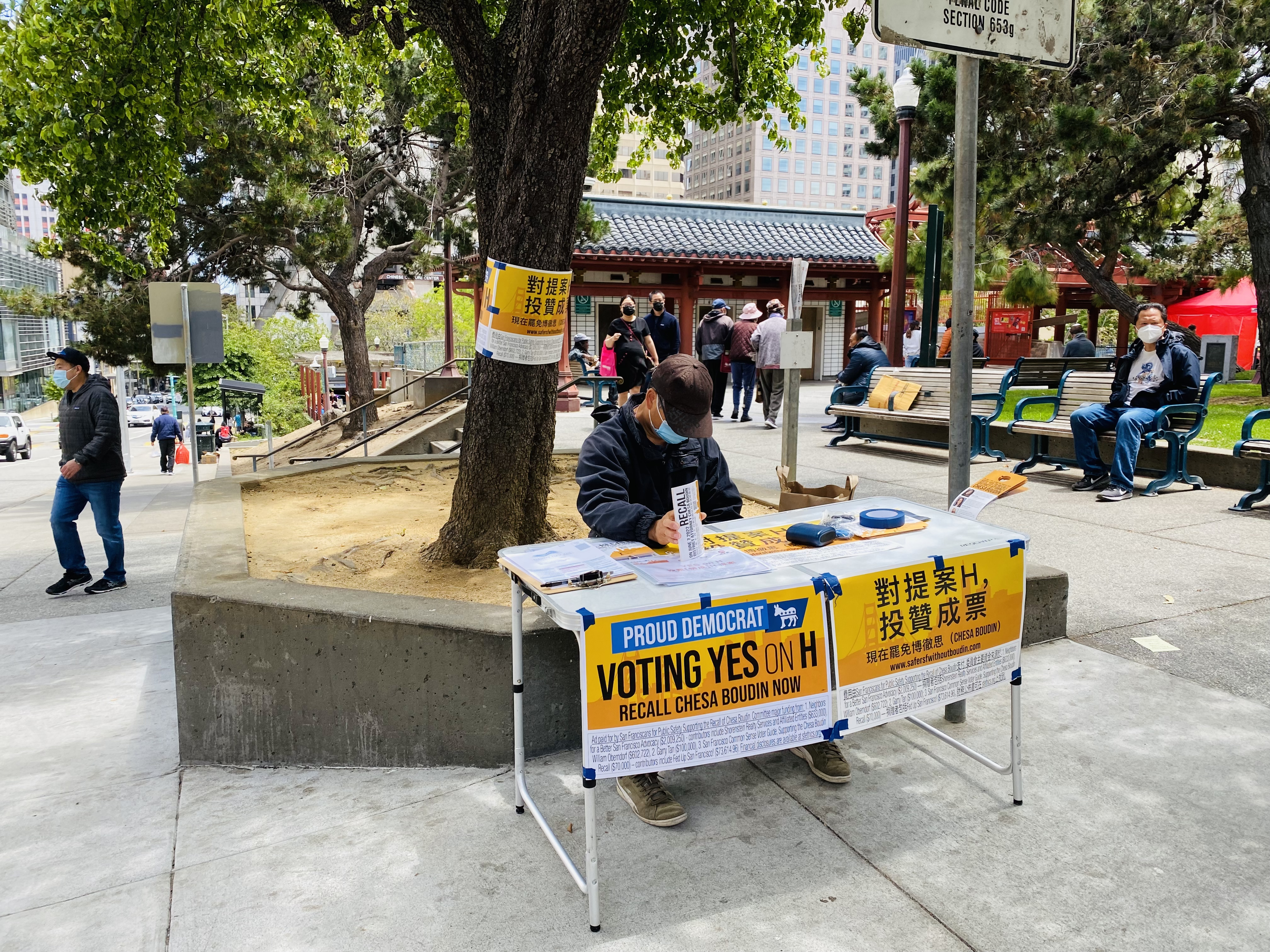
Man seated at a booth supporting the recall in Portsmouth Square

A few Democratic Clubs of San Francisco (such as the Chinese American Democratic Club, the District 2 Democratic Club, the United Democratic Club, the Eastern Neighborhood Democratic Club, and the Edwin M. Lee Asian Pacific Democratic Club) were in favor of the recall.

Asian and Asian-American activists and groups were among the leading forces in the pro-recall camp.

In a May 2022 poll sponsored by the San Francisco Standard, 53% of San Franciscans strongly disapproved of Boudin's job performance, 18% somewhat disapproved, 22% somewhat approved and 8% strongly approved. Among all groups, Asian Americans were the most likely to vote in favor of the recall. The San Francisco Standard Voter Poll found that 67% of Asian American and Pacific Islander voters were in favor of the recall, compared with 52% of Hispanic voters, 51% of White voters, and 34% of Black voters.

The San Francisco Chronicle investigated Boudin's office's prosecution data from 2020 to 2021 and found that his office's charging rates increased for homicide, rape, and narcotics, while it decreased for burglary, petty theft, and weapons cases. Boudin claimed that many cases brought to his office by San Francisco police lacked evidence to meet the standard required to prosecute some cases, leading to his office's lower charge rates.

Local San Francisco news media endorsements were nearly unanimous in opposing the recall. The race was watched nationally as other DAs championing criminal justice reform faced similar challenges.

=== Funding ===
The pro-recall campaign raised over $7.2 million, while the anti-recall campaign raised over $3.3 million.

The pro-recall campaigns relied primarily on local donations, with 78% of donating entities based in San Francisco. One of its biggest donors was billionaire William Oberndorf.

The anti-recall campaign was funded in large part by out of state donations, with 49% of donating entities based in San Francisco. Its largest donors were the ACLU of Northern California, unions, and billionaire Chris Larsen.

Analysis of donations (Note: As of April 2022. Donors can be individuals or entities like a political action committee. Only donors contributing at least $100 to either campaign are included.)
Position on recall	Amount raised (millions)	Proportion of donors in San Francisco	Proportion of donors in California	Number of contributors	Average contribution per contributor
For recall	$7.2	78%	96%	946	$4,462
Against recall	$3.3	49%	76%	1,610	$1,327

== Endorsements ==
"Yes" (for recall)

San Francisco Supervisors

- Matt Dorsey, District 6
- Catherine Stefani, District 2

Former government officials

- Quentin L. Kopp, former state senator

Organizations

- Chinese American Democratic Party
- District 2 Democratic Club
- Eastern Neighborhood Democratic Club
- Edwin M. Lee Asian Pacific Democratic Club
- GrowSF
- San Francisco Chamber of Commerce
- San Francisco Republican Party
- San Francisco Taxpayer Association
- United Democratic Club

Newspapers and other media

- The Marina Times
- National Review

Unions

- LiUNA Local 261
- UA Local 38
"No" (against recall)

San Francisco Supervisors

- Connie Chan, District 1
- Matt Haney, District 6
- Gordon Mar, District 4
- Aaron Peskin, District 3
- Dean Preston, District 5
- Hillary Ronen, District 9
- Shamann Walton, District 10

Former San Francisco Supervisors

- Amos Brown
- David Campos
- Bevan Dufty
- Sandra Lee Fewer
- Matt Gonzalez, Chief Attorney for the San Francisco Public Defender's Office
- Mark Leno, California State Senator (2008–2016)

California State Assemblymembers

- Matt Haney
- Phil Ting

Individuals

- Danny Glover, actor and activist
- Jesse Jackson, activist
- John Legend, singer

Unions

- California Nurses Association
- Service Employees International Union Local 1021

Organizations

- American Civil Liberties Union, North California Chapter
- Noe Valley Democratic Club
- Our Revolution
- San Francisco Berniecrats
- San Francisco Democratic Party
- San Francisco Libertarian Party
- San Francisco Tenants Union

Newspapers and other media

- Bay Area Reporter
- San Francisco Bay Guardian
- San Francisco Bay View
- San Francisco Chronicle
- San Francisco Examiner
- Sing Tao Daily

== Polling ==
Graphical summary

Poll source	Date(s) administered	Sample size (Note: Key: A – all adults RV – registered voters LV – likely voters V – unclear)	Margin of error	Yes on recall	No on recall	Undecided
Change Research (D)	May 26–29, 2022	541 (LV)	± 4.5%	56%	32%	12%
Public Policy Polling (D) (Note: Poll conducted for the anti-recall campaign)	May 13–14, 2022	697 (LV)	± 4.3%	48%	38%	14%
Embold Research (D) (Note: Embold is the public-facing nonpartisan business unit of Democratic polling firm Change Research)	April 30 – May 4, 2022	1,048 (RV)	± 3.8%	57%	22%	21%
EMC Research (D) (Note: Poll conducted for the San Francisco Chamber of Commerce, which supports the recall)	April 27 – May 3, 2022	500 (LV)	± 4.4%	67%	31%	3%
EMC Research (D) (Note: Poll conducted for the recall campaign)	February 17–21, 2022	800 (LV)	± 4.4%	68%	32%	<1%

== Results ==
The recall election had a higher turnout than the 2019 election that elected Boudin, with 46% of registered voters compared to 41%.

With 55% of votes returning "Yes", Chesa Boudin was recalled from office.

2022 San Francisco District Attorney recall election
Choice	Votes	%
For	122,588	55.03
Against	100,177	44.97
Total	222,765	100.00
Valid votes	222,765	96.96
Invalid/blank votes	6,995	3.04
Total votes	229,760	100.00
Registered voters/turnout	495,498	46.37
Source: City and County of San Francisco - Department of Elections

== Aftermath ==
=== Neighbors for a Better San Francisco Advocacy ethics fine ===
In August 2024, the San Francisco Standard reported that Jay Cheng negotiated a $54,000 settlement with the San Francisco Ethics Commission. The commission found that Neighbors for a Better San Francisco Advocacy, a 501(c)(4) which Cheng runs, and largely coordinated the campaign to recall Boudin, failed to disclose payments of nearly $200,000 to public relations firm Riff City Strategies.

=== Local analysis ===
The successful recall election reflected a change in mood from voters between Boudin's election in 2019 and the recall election in 2022. Stories of burglaries, shoplifting, and violent attacks on Asian Americans fomented voter anger. San Francisco Supervisor Rafael Mandelman noted, "The voters have risen up and expressed tremendous frustration with the state of the city and a feeling that leaders are not taking us in the direction the people want to go." The voter frustration combined with heavy fundraising, particularly from San Francisco businessmen like Bill Oberndorf and Garry Tan, allowed the recall effort to create a campaign which resonated with the voters, despite wide support for Boudin from newspaper editorials, elected officials and political clubs.

The case of Troy McAlister, who was on parole when he allegedly killed two people in a crosswalk, electrified recall proponents. McAlister had been arrested multiple times in the months leading up to the deaths, but Boudin declined to file charges, relying on the state parole system. Recall proponents used the case to show that Boudin was not holding lawbreakers accountable, while Boudin supporters called the deaths tragic and unforeseeable.

Some former District Attorney's office staff, who were fired or resigned, became vocal proponents of the recall.

Although voters became more concerned for their personal safety during the COVID-19 pandemic, Boudin continued to focus on his campaign promises including expansion of diversion programs, reducing the jail population, and prosecute police officers. This invited criticism that Boudin cared more for offenders than for victims. While other local politicians like San Francisco Mayor London Breed changed their focus to public safety, Boudin did not adjust his messaging.

=== Regional and national context ===
Journalists and opinion writers speculated on what the election meant for criminal justice reform efforts nationwide. The successful recall reflected voter frustration with quality of life street conditions such as homelessness, substance abuse, property crime, violence against Asian Americans, and mental illness. Democratic strategists suggested that the electorate in the November midterms would be shifting rightwards on police, crime, and public safety; and candidates and politicians should change their messaging accordingly.

In the June primary election, progressive candidates for law enforcement positions in the extended Bay Area had a mixed performance, neither a sweep nor a blowout. While progressive District Attorneys lost in San Joaquin, Sacramento, and Santa Clara Counties, some progressive candidates succeeded. Contra Costa County District Attorney Diana Becton, who prosecuted a sheriff's deputy for killing a person while on duty, handily won re-election against law enforcement opposition. In Alameda County, progressive District Attorney candidate Pamela Price advanced to the runoff, while reformer Sheriff candidate Yesenia Sanchez defeated four-term incumbent Greg Ahern. Statewide in the California Attorney General race, Rob Bonta received 54% of the vote on a criminal justice reform platform.

=== Next District Attorney ===
Mayor London Breed appointed Brooke Jenkins to replace Boudin as District Attorney. Jenkins was a former employee of Boudin who left the office and became a vocal proponent and surrogate of the recall campaign. Jenkins assumed office on Friday, July 8, 2022. Jenkins pledged to enforce drug crime laws, take a harder line on property crime, and address safety concerns of Asian residents. Jenkins pledged to balance reform and public safety, echoing messaging from the recall campaign.

Jenkins won the following November 2022 special election. The next regular election for a full term for District Attorney is November 2024.

== See also ==
- 2022 San Francisco Board of Education recall elections
- 2024 Alameda County District Attorney recall election

== Notes ==
Partisan clients
