= 2022 San Francisco District Attorney special election =

- November 8, 2022
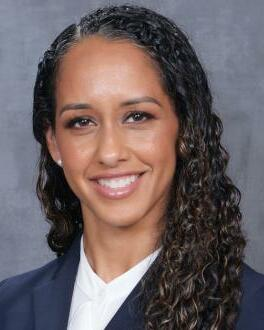

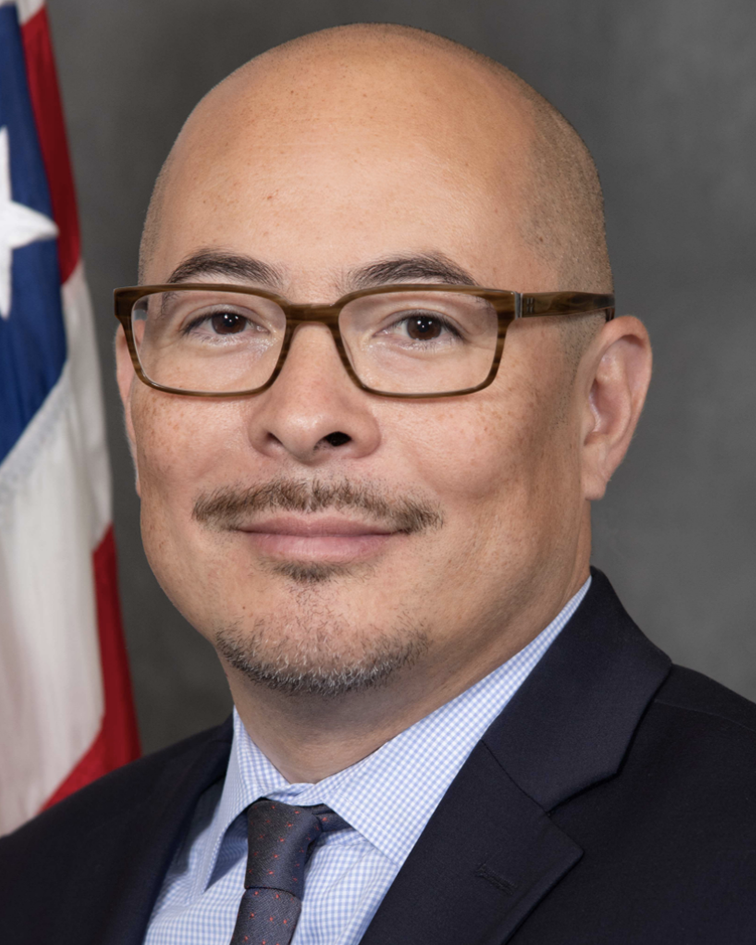

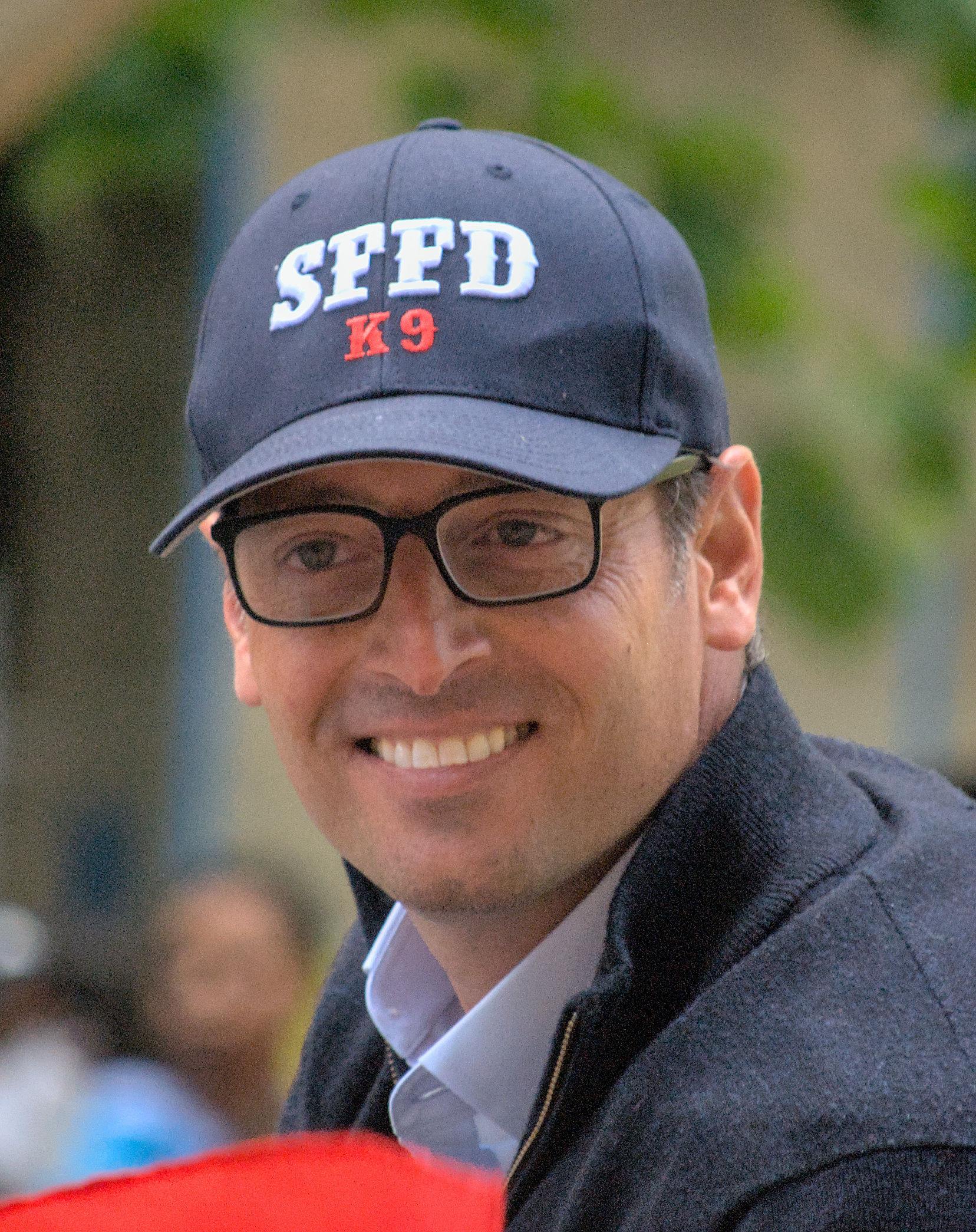
Candidate	Brooke Jenkins	John Hamasaki	Joe Alioto Veronese
First round	126,505; 45.9%	102,612; 37.2%	34,603; 12.5%
Maximum round	142,412; 53.7%	122,906; 46.3%	Eliminated
- Final round results by precinct Jenkins: 50–60% 60–70% 70–80% >90% Hamasaki: 50–60% 60–70% No data
District Attorney before election
Brooke Jenkins
Elected District Attorney
Brooke Jenkins

The 2022 San Francisco District Attorney special election was held on November 8, 2022, following the successful recall of San Francisco District Attorney Chesa Boudin. It was held concurrent with the 2022 statewide general elections.

Following Boudin's removal from office, Mayor London Breed appointed Brooke Jenkins as the interim District Attorney on July 8, 2022. After winning the special election, Jenkins served the remainder of the unexpired term until January 2025.

== Candidates ==
=== Declared ===
As of the filing deadline, these candidates were listed on the San Francisco Department of Elections webpage.

- Maurice Chenier, corporate attorney and candidate for District Attorney in 2007 (party affiliation: Independent)
- John Hamasaki, criminal defense attorney and former member of the San Francisco Police Commission (party affiliation: Democratic)
- Brooke Jenkins, interim District Attorney (party affiliation: Democratic)
- Joe Alioto Veronese, civil rights attorney, former member of the San Francisco Police Commission, San Francisco Fire Commission, and California Council on Criminal Justice, grandson of former San Francisco mayor Joseph Alioto, and son of former San Francisco supervisor Angela Alioto (party affiliation: Democratic)

=== Declined ===
- Chesa Boudin, former District Attorney

== Endorsements ==
Joe Alioto Veronese

Labor unions

- San Francisco Building and Construction Trades Council
- Service Employees International Union Local 1021

Organizations

- San Francisco Democratic Party (second choice)
- San Francisco Republican Party (co-endorsement with Chenier and Jenkins)
Maurice Chenier

Organizations

- San Francisco Republican Party (co-endorsement with Alioto Veronese and Jenkins)
John Hamasaki

State politicians

- Tom Ammiano, former California state assemblyman
- Mark Leno, former California state senator and runner-up for mayor of San Francisco in 2018

Local politicians

- John Avalos, former San Francisco supervisor
- Matt Gonzalez, former president of the San Francisco Board of Supervisors
- Sandra Lee Fewer, former San Francisco supervisor
- Dean Preston, San Francisco supervisor
- Mano Raju, San Francisco Public Defender
- Hillary Ronen, San Francisco supervisor
- Norman Yee, former president of the San Francisco Board of Supervisors

Organizations

- San Francisco Democratic Party (first choice)
- San Francisco Green Party
Brooke Jenkins

State politicians

- Malia Cohen, chair of the California State Board of Equalization
- Fiona Ma, California State Treasurer
- Paul Miyamoto, San Francisco Sheriff
- Scott Wiener, California state senator

Local politicians

- London Breed, mayor of San Francisco
- Rafael Mandelman, San Francisco supervisor

Organizations

- San Francisco Police Officers Association
- San Francisco Republican Party (co-endorsement with Alioto Veronese and Chenier)

Newspapers

- San Francisco Examiner
Declined to endorse

Newspapers

- San Francisco Chronicle

== Polling ==
Poll source	Date(s) administered	Margin of error	Sample size (Note: Key: A – all adults RV – registered voters LV – likely voters V – unclear)	Joe Alito Veronese	Maurice Chenier	John Hamaski	Brooke Jenkins	Undecided
Embold Research/San Francisco Standard	October 1–7, 2022	± 3.9%	944 (RV)	4%	<1%	10%	25%	61%
Embold Research/San Francisco Standard	October 1–7, 2022	± 3.9%	<944 (LV) (Note: The published results of the poll did not state how many respondents were likely voters.)	5%	<1%	9%	28%	58%
EMC Research (Note: Poll conducted for the Jenkins campaign)	August 28 – September 1, 2022	± 4.9%	400 (LV)	15%	5%	26%	49%	6%

== Results ==
2022 San Francisco District Attorney special election
Candidate	Round 1		Round 2		Round 3	
Candidate	Votes	%	Votes	%	Votes	%
Brooke Jenkins (incumbent)	126,505	45.85	130,215	47.64	142,412	53.68
John Hamasaki	102,612	37.19	105,770	38.70	122,906	46.32
Joe Alioto Veronese	34,603	12.54	37,332	13.66	Eliminated	
Maurice Chenier	12,211	4.43	Eliminated			
Continuing ballots	261,703		259,221		251,651	
Blank ballots	27,870		27,870		27,870	
Exhausted ballots	0		2,394		9,763	
Overvotes	1,224		1,312		1,513	
