= Brooke Jenkins =

American lawyer and politician

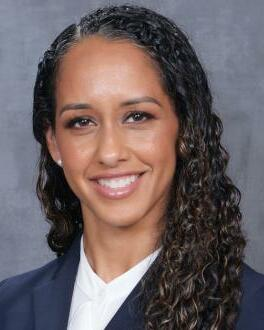
- Official portrait, 2022

30th District Attorney of San Francisco
- Incumbent
- Assumed office July 8, 2022; Acting: July 8, 2022 – December 1, 2022
- Preceded by: Chesa Boudin

Personal details
- Born: August 1981 (age 44)
- Party: Democratic
- Education: University of California, Berkeley (BA); University of Chicago (JD)
- Website: Campaign website

Brooke Jenkins (born August 1981) is an American lawyer serving as the 30th district attorney of San Francisco. On July 8, 2022, Jenkins was appointed interim district attorney by Mayor London Breed following the successful recall of Chesa Boudin, for which she actively campaigned and was found to have improperly accessed and shared sensitive information. She was elected in her own right to fill the unexpired term the following November. She was elected to a full term in November 2024.

Jenkins has been found to have committed two acts of prosecutorial misconduct, and in April 2025, the State Bar of California placed her in a mandatory diversion program after numerous ethics complaints were filed against her.

== Early life and education ==
Jenkins grew up in Union City, California. She was raised by her mother because shortly after her birth, her father had to leave the country due to his student visa status. Her father is from El Salvador. She received a Bachelor of Arts from the University of California, Berkeley, and a J.D. degree from the University of Chicago Law School.

== Early career ==
Jenkins was admitted to the State Bar of California in 2011. Prior to becoming a prosecutor, she worked for two years in corporate law, defending foreign and domestic automakers and manufacturers.

=== Prosecutor ===
Jenkins worked in the San Francisco District Attorney's Office for seven years from 2014 to 2021 where she started as an attorney handling misdemeanor cases and later served as a hate crime prosecutor. She completed one homicide trial, during which, she was later found to have committed prosecutorial misconduct.

=== Chesa Boudin recall campaign ===
Jenkins resigned from her role as assistant district attorney in October 2021. Soon after, she began to publicly support the recall campaign against San Francisco District Attorney Chesa Boudin. The campaign was run by Neighbors for a Better San Francisco Advocacy, a 501(c)(4) organization.

Jenkins was paid nearly $175,000 by three non-profits over the six months she was not employed by the city; $153,000 from the 501(c)(3) Neighbors for a Better San Francisco, and $10,000 each from Sister’s Circle Women Support Network and GlobalSF which hold the same non-profit status.

Jenkins later stated that her role with the recall campaign was that of a volunteer. The San Francisco Standard reported that "Jenkins has declined to provide evidence beyond her own statements" to prove that it was a volunteer position.

== District Attorney ==
=== Interim role ===
Mayor London Breed announced on July 7, 2022, the appointment of Jenkins to serve in the interim until an election was to be held on November 8, 2022, to elect a District Attorney to serve the rest of Boudin's term through 2023. She was sworn into office on July 8, 2022. Her first act within the office was to hold a meeting with senior staff, where she was accompanied by Andrea Bruss, the deputy chief of staff of the Mayor's Office. A week later, she fired 15 attorneys, as well as top Boudin advisors like his chief of staff, director of communications and policy advisor, and director of data, research and analytics.

Between her appointment and August 2022, Jenkins instituted policies such as allowing her attorneys to seek gang enhancements, allowing the conditional prosecution of minors as adults, and making drug dealers ineligible for community courts. Under her term, convictions rose 5% from 2022 to 2023. She supported Proposition E in 2022, which aimed to expand the use of police surveillance through the use of live cameras. It was first implemented in the Mission District. Proposition E was criticized by organizations such as the ACLU, the Electronic Frontier Foundation, the San Francisco Public Defender's Office, among others citing privacy concerns and the potential for the suppression of dissent. Despite her campaign pledge to prosecute minors as adults only in the most egregious cases that would shock the conscience of the community, she announced in 2025 a new policy to charge minors as adults in a broader context, a break from decades of state and federal court precedent.

=== Special election ===
Jenkins ran in the November 2022 special election to serve the remainder of Boudin's term through 2023. She won with 53.7% of the vote.

On October 13, 2022, retired Superior Court Judge, Martha Goldin filed a State Bar complaint against Jenkins, outlining multiple misconduct allegations. Jenkins was paid a six-figure consulting fee by the nonprofit Neighbors for a Better San Francisco, which shares a name and an office with the Chesa Boudin recall campaign. Jenkins had not previously disclosed these payments was registered as a volunteer. In October 2022, an anonymous complaint was filed with San Francisco's Ethics Commission and the California Fair Political Practices Commission accusing Jenkins of failing to register as a campaign consultant. The complaint alleged that the $153,000 salary Jenkins received from the nonprofit was intended for partisan purposes.

=== 2024 election to District Attorney ===
Jenkins ran again for district attorney in the 2024 election and won election to a full term in office.

== Controversies ==
=== Prosecutorial misconduct ===
In 2016, the California Court of Appeal overturned a conviction after finding that Jenkins committed prosecutorial misconduct by improperly commenting on a defendant's exercise of his right to remain silent and thereby interfering with a defendant's constitutional rights.

In August 2023, the California Court of Appeal, First District, found that Brooke Jenkins committed prosecutorial misconduct in a homicide case she prosecuted in 2021 by making improper arguments about the defense attorney in violation of ethical rules.

San Francisco public defenders have alleged that the DA's office has withheld evidence, such as police body camera footage, crime scene photographs, police reports, and witness statements, at least 50 times throughout the months of September 2024 to February 2025.

=== Ethics complaints and diversion program ===
In October 2022, Mission Local editor Joe Eskenazi revealed that just before leaving the District Attorney's Office, Jenkins had sent sensitive files, including a rap sheet, from the District Attorney's office to Assistant District Attorney Don DuBain's personal email. Neither DuBain, nor Jenkins had any legitimate reason to possess the un-redacted files. Jenkins went on to use the un-redacted files in her work for the campaign to recall District Attorney Chesa Boudin. In California, disseminating a rap sheet to a person who is unauthorized to receive it is a misdemeanor. Jenkins claimed that she accidentally sent the email to DuBain's personal email.

After she was elected to the DA's office, a number of ethics complaints against Jenkins were filed with the State Bar of California, "including from retired Los Angeles Superior Court Judge Martha Goldin, a San Francisco resident who donated to keep Boudin in office."

In April 2025, the State Bar of California directed Brooke Jenkins to complete a diversion program in response to the previously filed complaints. The program was recently created to rehabilitate attorneys accused of misconduct and prevent them from reoffending in the future. Her participation in this program will be mandatory. As part of that process, the state bar sent letters to the original complainants, which explained the decision to require Jenkins participate in the diversion program. The letter also said that regarding the "allegation that Jenkins coached a witness in a molestation trial," the state bar found no evidence. Lastly, the letter stated that the bar "found evidence that Jenkins improperly accessed or handled the rap sheet, but would have trouble proving misconduct at a disciplinary hearing."

=== Hiring and promotion of long time friend ===
In 2022, Jenkins hired her longtime friend, classmate, and high school track and field teammate, Monifa Willis as Chief of the Victim Services Division, after Jenkins demoted the former Chief of Victim Services Division, Kasie Lee. Victim services employees criticized this move as "nepotism" and said Willis had no knowledge of the law around victims' rights. Willis does not hold a law license. Prior to joining the DA's office, Willis was an assistant professor of nursing at UCSF, however she was permitted to keep her teaching job, and was seen teaching classes during working hours.

Then, in March 2024, Jenkins promoted Willis to Chief of Staff of the San Francisco District Attorney's Office. For the Chief of Staff role, Willis earns a nearly $300,000 annual salary, in addition to the $100,000 annual salary she makes from her teaching job. She is the first person to ever hold the position who is not a licensed attorney. Some counties, such as Contra Costa, require the person holding the role to hold a license to practice law and have 10 years of professional legal experience; San Francisco requires "four years of managerial experience in a legal, legislative or clinical social environment."

Venmo records show Jenkins and Willis going to dinner, attending a football game, renting a car, and visiting a waxing salon together. Jenkins did not disclose their relationship prior to the hiring decision, in violation of city ethics rules, which state that close relationships must be disclosed.

== Personal life ==
Jenkins lives in San Francisco, CA with her husband, two children, and her stepdaughter.
