= Politics in the San Francisco Bay Area =

Politics in the San Francisco Bay Area is widely regarded as one of the most liberal in the country. According to the California Secretary of State, the Democratic Party holds a voter registration advantage in every congressional district, State Senate district, State Assembly district, State Board of Equalization district, County Board of Supervisors district, all nine counties, and all of the 101 incorporated municipalities in the Bay Area. The Republican Party holds a voter registration advantage in one congressional sub-district (the portion of the 9th in Contra Costa County) and unincorporated Solano County.

Since 1960, the nine-county Bay Area has voted for Republican presidential candidates only twice: in 1972 for Richard Nixon and in 1980 for Ronald Reagan, both Californians. The last county to vote for a Republican presidential candidate was Napa County in 1988 for George H. W. Bush.

== County-level statistics ==
All nine counties in the Bay Area currently have a voter registration advantage in favor of the Democratic Party.

County
County	Population (2020)	2024 election results	Median household income (2018)	Per capita income (2011)	Voter Registration (2023)		
County	Population (2020)	2024 election results	Median household income (2018)	Per capita income (2011)	Democratic	Independent	Republican
Alameda	1,682,296	74.6%—21.0% Harris	$92,574	$33,888	563,864	222,019	102,953
Contra Costa	1,165,983	67.3%-29.4% Harris	$93,712	$36,274	379,524	153,822	127,752
Marin	262,325	80.6%-16.7% Harris	$110,217	$49,439	106,921	33,102	20,721
Napa	138,014	65.9%-31.1% Harris	$84,753	$32,170	42,491	16,988	17,731
San Francisco	878,392	80.3%-15.5% Harris	$104,552	$44,905	318,286	122,624	34,890
San Mateo	764,659	73.5%-23.2% Harris	$113,776	$44,331	244,946	104,646	60,259
Santa Clara	1,936,278	68.0%-28.1% Harris	$116,178	$39,365	525,176	280,493	167,840
Solano	453,551	60.0%-37.0% Harris	$77,609	$27,785	129,593	57,895	58,542
Sonoma	488,862	71.4%-25.2% Harris	$76,753	$30,868	171,744	53,578	52,658
Median	—	—	$96,265	$37,851	—	—	—
Total	7,770,360	70.1%–24.2% Harris	—	—	2,482,545	1,342,167	643,346

Counties by population and voter registration
County	Population	Registered voters	Democratic	Republican	D–R spread	American Independent	Green	Libertarian	Peace and Freedom	Americans Elect	Other	No party preference
Alameda	1,494,876	54.6%	56.4%	14.1%	+42.3%	2.0%	1.2%	0.5%	0.4%	0.0%	6.0%	19.5%
Contra Costa	1,037,817	58.5%	50.4%	21.8%	+24.8%	2.6%	0.5%	0.6%	0.2%	0.0%	0.2%	23.7%
Marin	250,666	61.5%	54.4%	18.2%	+36.2%	2.1%	1.4%	0.5%	0.2%	0.0%	0.3%	12.9%
Napa	135,377	56.2%	46.9%	24.2%	+22.7%	3.0%	0.8%	0.8%	0.3%	0.0%	0.5%	23.4%
San Francisco	870,887	62.4%	55.6%	8.6%	+47.0%	1.8%	1.7%	0.6%	0.3%	0.0%	0.3%	31.1%
San Mateo	711,622	50.7%	51.3%	19.4%	+31.9%	2.1%	0.7%	0.5%	0.2%	0.0%	0.2%	25.5%
Santa Clara	1,762,754	46.5%	45.6%	21.7%	+23.9%	2.1%	0.5%	0.6%	0.2%	0.0%	0.2%	29.0%
Solano	411,620	51.1%	48.6%	25.0%	+23.6%	2.8%	0.4%	0.5%	0.4%	0.0%	0.4%	22.0%
Sonoma	478,551	54.7%	51.5%	21.6%	+29.9%	2.5%	1.8%	0.7%	0.3%	0.0%	0.3%	21.3%

== Congressional districts ==
Every Congressional district in the Bay Area is currently represented by a Democrat. According to the Cook Partisan Voting Index (CPVI), congressional districts the Bay Area tends to favor Democratic candidates by roughly 40 to 50 percentage points, considerably above the mean for California and the nation overall. All congressional districts in the region voted for Democrat Kamala Harris over Republican Donald Trump in the 2024 Presidential Election.

District	Location	Representative	Cook PVI	2024 election results	Median household income (2025)
2nd	Marin County and the North Coast	Jared Huffman	D+24	70.9%–25.7% Harris	$97,004
4th	Lake and Napa, most of Yolo, and parts of Solano and Sonoma	Mike Thompson	D+17	64.0%–32.8% Harris	$98,067
8th	Parts of Solano and Contra Costa around the Sacramento-San Joaquin River Delta	John Garamendi	D+24	70.1%-26.6% Harris	$95,876
10th	Most of Contra Costa: Concord, Southern Antioch, Walnut Creek and parts of Alameda, California	Mark DeSaulnier	D+18	65.2%-31.4% Harris	$151,546
11th	San Francisco	Nancy Pelosi	D+36	81.4%–14.1% Harris	$142,524
12th	Berkeley, Oakland, and San Leandro	Lateefah Simon	D+39	84.5% 10.6% Harris	$111,408
14th	Hayward, Union City, and the Tri-Valley	Eric Swalwell	D+20	65.8%-30.3% Harris	$137,402
15th	Most of San Mateo County and southern San Francisco	Kevin Mullin	D+27	72.2%-24.3% Harris	$151,494
16th	From Pacifica to the southern edge of San Jose through Menlo Park and western Silicon Valley	Sam Liccardo	D+26	72.5%-23.9% Harris	$181,659
17th	South of Fremont and northern Silicon Valley	Ro Khanna	D+25	66.7%-28.8% Harris	$181,913
18th	San Jose and Morgan Hill	Zoe Lofgren	D+23	63.2%-33.7% Harris	$103,010
Median	—	—	D+19	72%–25% Harris	$69,316

During the Base Realignment and Closures (BRACs) of the 1990s, almost all the military installations in the region were closed. The only remaining major active duty military installations are Travis Air Force Base and Coast Guard Island.

== See also ==
- San Francisco Public Pressure Groups
- Politics of San Francisco
