= Flag of San Francisco =

City and County of San Francisco
- Use: Civil flag
- Adopted: December 16, 1940. Pictured version is c. 1940.
- Design: A white field with a yellow border, with a phoenix rising from flames. On a ribbon below, "Oro en paz. Fierro en guerra." with "SAN FRANCISCO" in blue at the bottom.

The Flag of the City and County of San Francisco contains a rising phoenix in the center, often assumed to refer to the city's recovery from the 1906 earthquake and subsequent fires. However, the phoenix had been a civic symbol of San Francisco at least since 1852, when it featured on the first official seal of the city. The Board of Supervisors of the City and County of San Francisco codified the design of the current flag on December 16, 1940.

== History ==
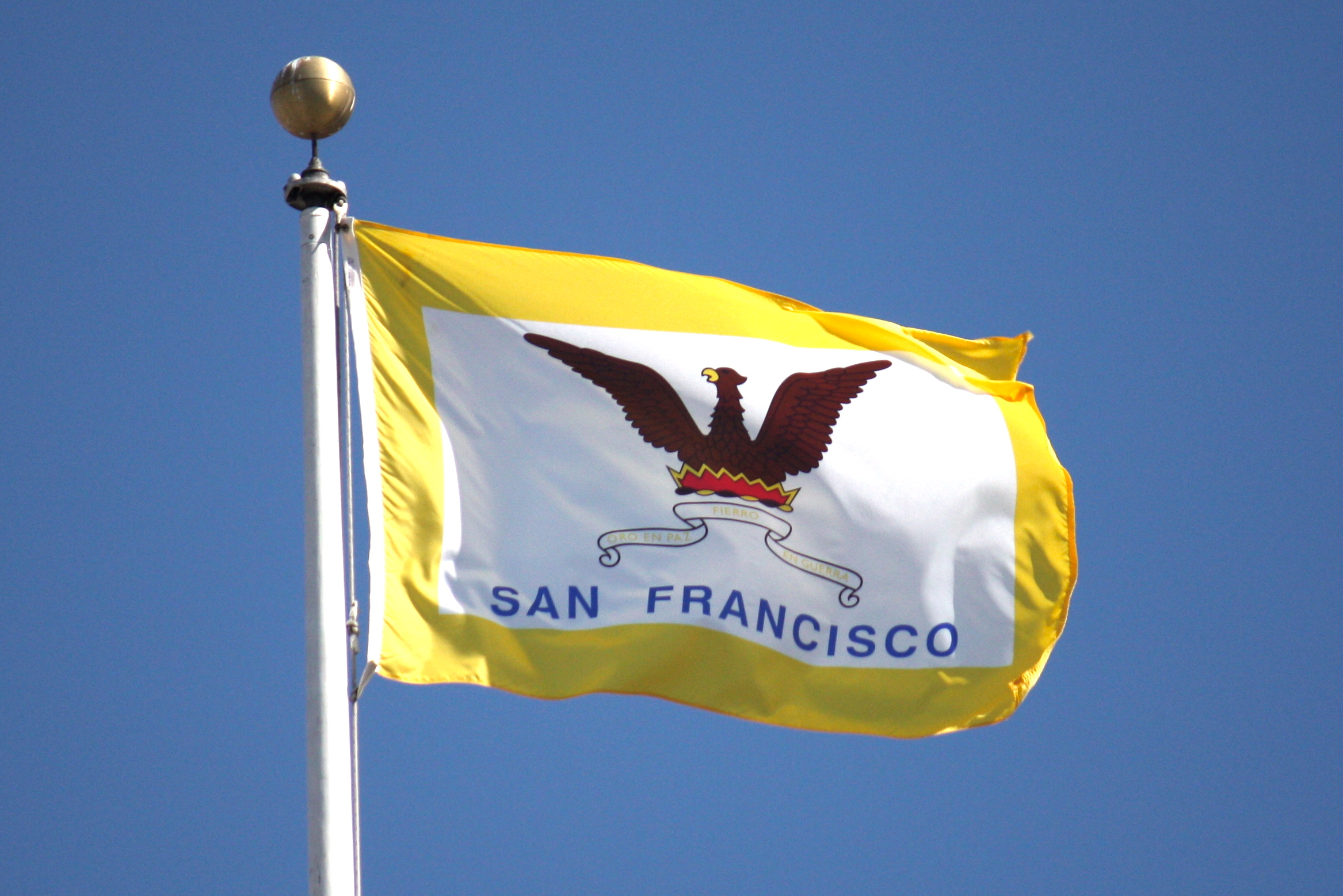
The San Francisco flag flying over San Francisco City Hall in October 2008.

The first documented city flag was in June of 1861 when the city's board of supervisors ordered a set of three flags made by Norcross. One of the flags was the city flag with the "Coat of arms of San Francisco" on its field. The flag cost $50 ($1,791 adjusted for inflation) to make. A similar flag was described one year later. It said that the flag hung in Platt's Hall during a fund for the wounded soldiers of the Civil War.

In 1900, banker and art patron James D. Phelan, the city’s mayor from 1897 to 1902, recommended to the Board of Supervisors of the City and County of San Francisco that San Francisco adopt a flag and motto. A contest was held, and more than one hundred proposals were submitted. Artist John M. Gamble's proposal was selected.

Gamble's concept depicted a black phoenix rising from gold flames on a white field. The mythological phoenix appears in many ancient cultures and is a symbol of immortality. When the long-lived phoenix feels death is near, it builds a nest of aromatic wood and sets it afire. A new phoenix then arises from the ashes, just as San Francisco arose from the great fires of the 1850s.

Below the phoenix and flames, the Spanish motto "Oro en paz y fierro en guerra" ("Gold in Peace and Iron in War") was on a black ribbon. The motto refers to the city's then-recent experience during the Spanish–American War as the embarkation point for troops to the Philippines in 1898.

Based on the motto, San Francisco's official city colors now are gold and black; these two colors decorate the dome of San Francisco City Hall.

During World War I the 363rd regiment was presented with the city flag. It was later taken to France during their deployment.

Digital reconstruction of 1861 flag of San Francisco from newspapers accounts. The flag was made by Norcross.

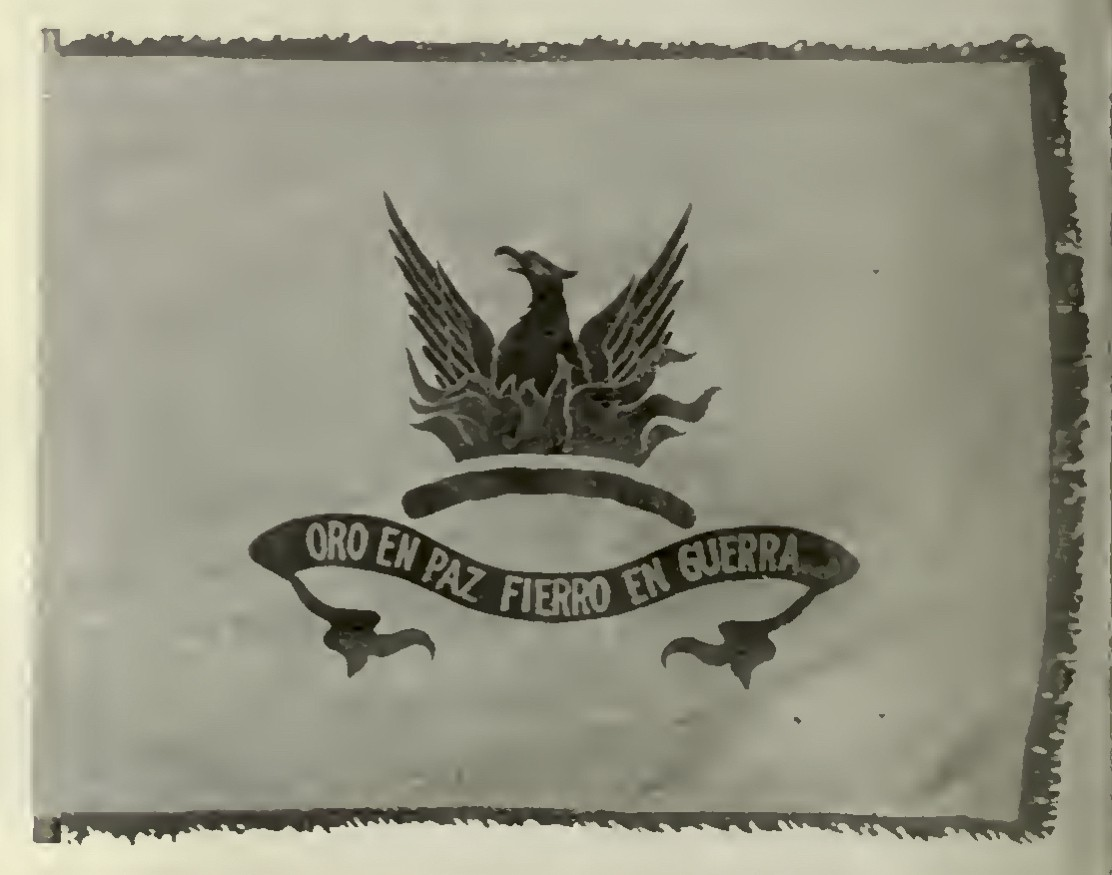
1929 replacement copy of original 1900 San Francisco flag designed by Robert Ingersoll Aitken.

Flag of San Francisco 1900–1940

== Design ==
The original design of the San Francisco flag was executed in 1900 by Robert Ingersoll Aitken. Now best known as a sculptor, Aitken would go on to create both the Victory figure atop the Dewey Monument, in San Francisco's Union Square, and the figures, above the inscription "Equal Justice Under Law," that preside over the famous entrance to the U.S. Supreme Court Building.

The San Francisco Police Department used the Aitken flag for ceremonial occasions from 1900 until sometime in the early 1920s. But, by 1923, the S.F.P.D. had adopted a different design that the San Francisco Fire Department had been using at least since 1915. This design featured the same symbolic elements — a phoenix above a motto ribbon — but used different artwork and introduced different colors, such as brown tones for the phoenix and red and orange for the flames. The fire department and police department each added to their shared symbolic elements information — "S.F.F.D." and "San Francisco Police Department," respectively — that marked these as departmental flags, not city flags.

In the early 1930s, the San Francisco Mayor's office began using a version of the police and fire department flags that featured only the symbolic elements.

In December 1940, the Board of Supervisors added to this "new" flag the name "San Francisco" in bold, blue letters and codified all of these elements as the official San Francisco flag.

The yellow border, now reproduced as a part of the flag, was originally intended to be a gold fringe, but mistakenly became incorporated into the design. When used indoors, as is the custom, a gold fringe is added to what was originally intended to be the fringe.

== See also ==
- Seal of San Francisco
