= 2019 San Francisco District Attorney election =

- November 5, 2019
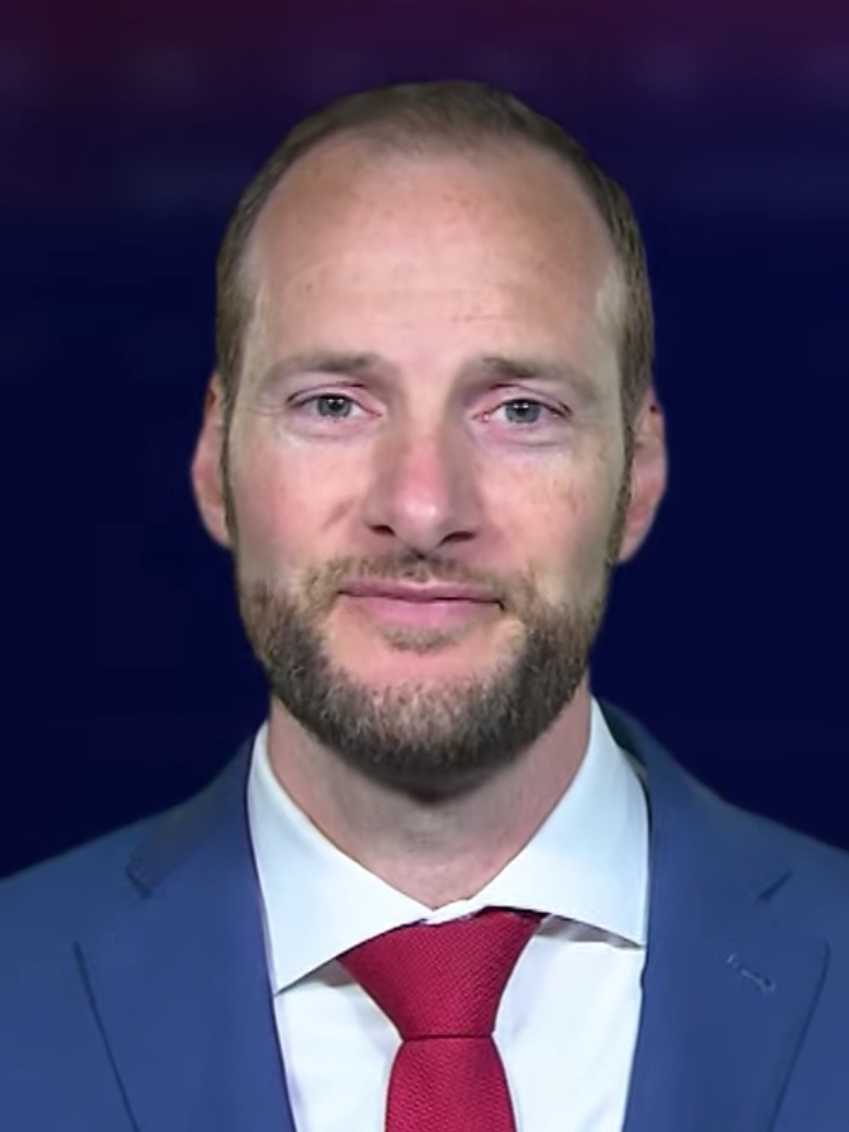

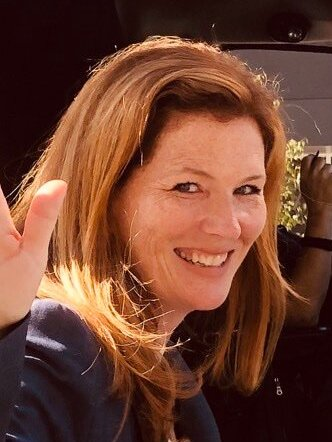

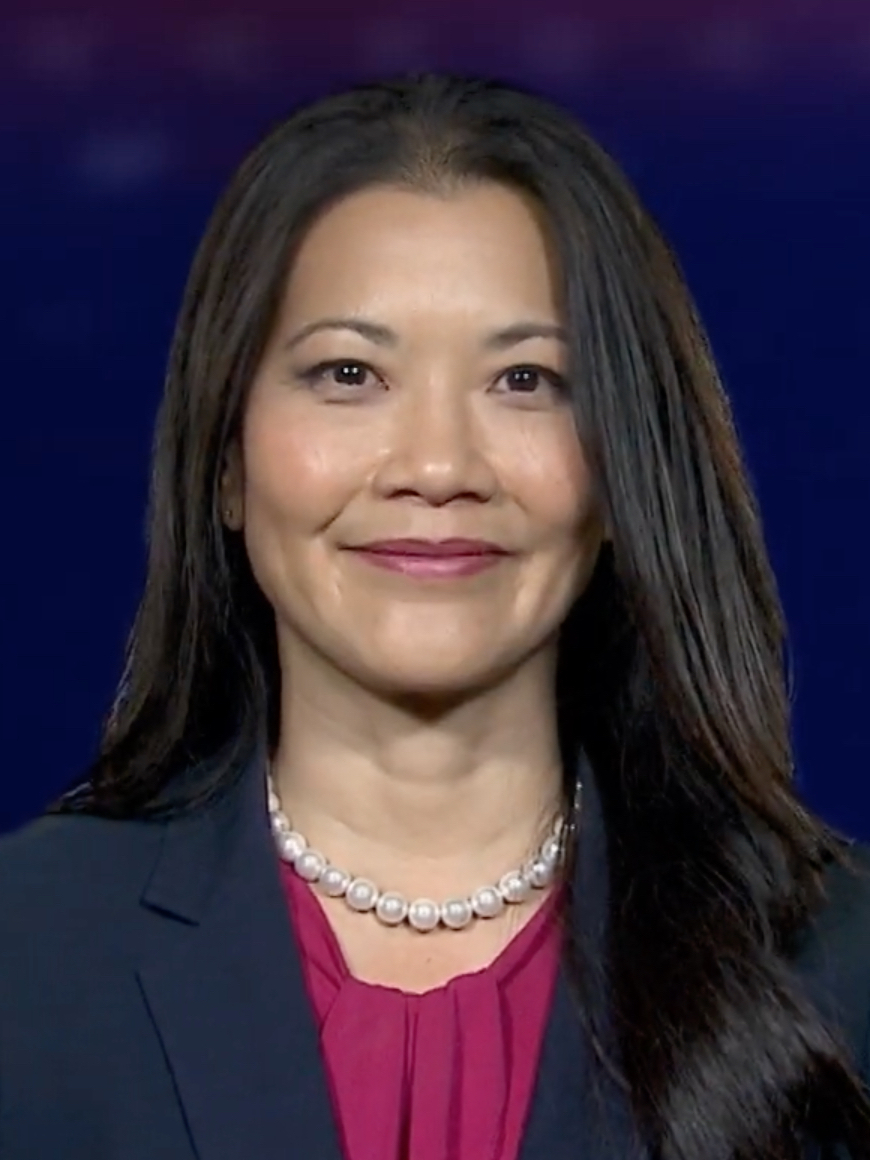

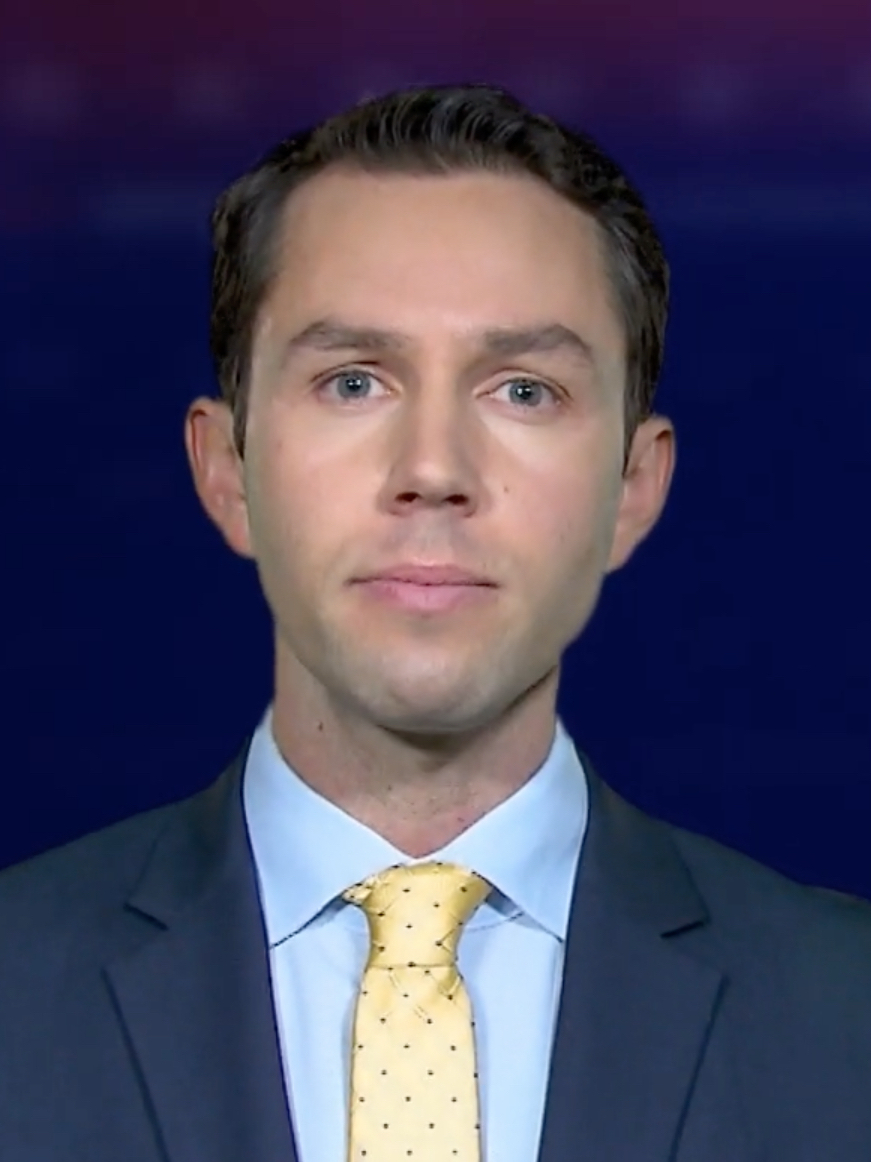
Candidate	Chesa Boudin	Suzy Loftus
First round	68,785; 35.6%	59,990; 31.1%
Maximum round	86,682; 50.8%	83,850; 49.2%
Candidate	Nancy Tung	Leif Dautch
First round	37,337; 19.3%	27,021; 14.0%
Maximum round	Eliminated	Eliminated
- First choice results by supervisorial district Boudin: 20–30% 30–40% 40–50% 50–60% Loftus: 30–40% 40–50% Tung: 30–40%
District Attorney before election
Suzy Loftus
Elected District Attorney
Chesa Boudin

The 2019 San Francisco District Attorney election was held on November 5, 2019, to elect the next District Attorney of San Francisco. The election, which was held alongside the 2019 mayoral election in which incumbent mayor London Breed won her first full term, was won by public defender Chesa Boudin.

The incumbent district attorney, George Gascón, announced in October 2018 that he would not seek a third term. Gascón then abruptly resigned in October 2019, and Breed appointed Suzy Loftus to replace him on an interim basis.

Four candidates, Chesa Boudin, Suzy Loftus, Nancy Tung, and Leif Dautch, ran in the nonpartisan election, with Boudin and Loftus seen as the front-runners. San Francisco elections are conducted using ranked-choice voting: voters are permitted to rank the candidates in order of preference, and should no candidate garner a majority of first-choice votes, the support of the candidates with the fewest votes are successively re-allocated until one candidate attains a majority.

The winner of the election was unclear for several days; Loftus conceded the race to Boudin on November 9. The final results showed Boudin defeating Loftus by 4.6 percentage points in first-choice votes, and by 1.7 percentage points in the final round.

== Background ==
In January 2011, district attorney Kamala Harris resigned to become attorney general of California, having been elected in 2010. George Gascón, at the time the chief of police of San Francisco, was appointed as her successor by outgoing Mayor Gavin Newsom, who had been elected in 2010 to become lieutenant governor of California. Gascón was subsequently elected to two full terms as district attorney, in 2011 and in 2015.

On October 2, 2018, after Suzy Loftus announced her candidacy for the office, Gascón announced that he would not seek re-election. On October 19, 2019, in the midst of the campaign, Gascón abruptly resigned as district attorney; he said he was considering running for district attorney of Los Angeles in 2020. Mayor London Breed then appointed Loftus to replace Gascón. The appointment was criticized by Loftus's election opponents, who charged that Breed was conferring the advantage of incumbency on her preferred candidate less than three weeks before the election; until the appointment of Loftus, the election had been slated to be the first open race for district attorney in over a century. However, some contend that the appointment hurt Loftus's chances in the election, as voters felt that the decision had seemingly been taken away from them.

== Candidates ==
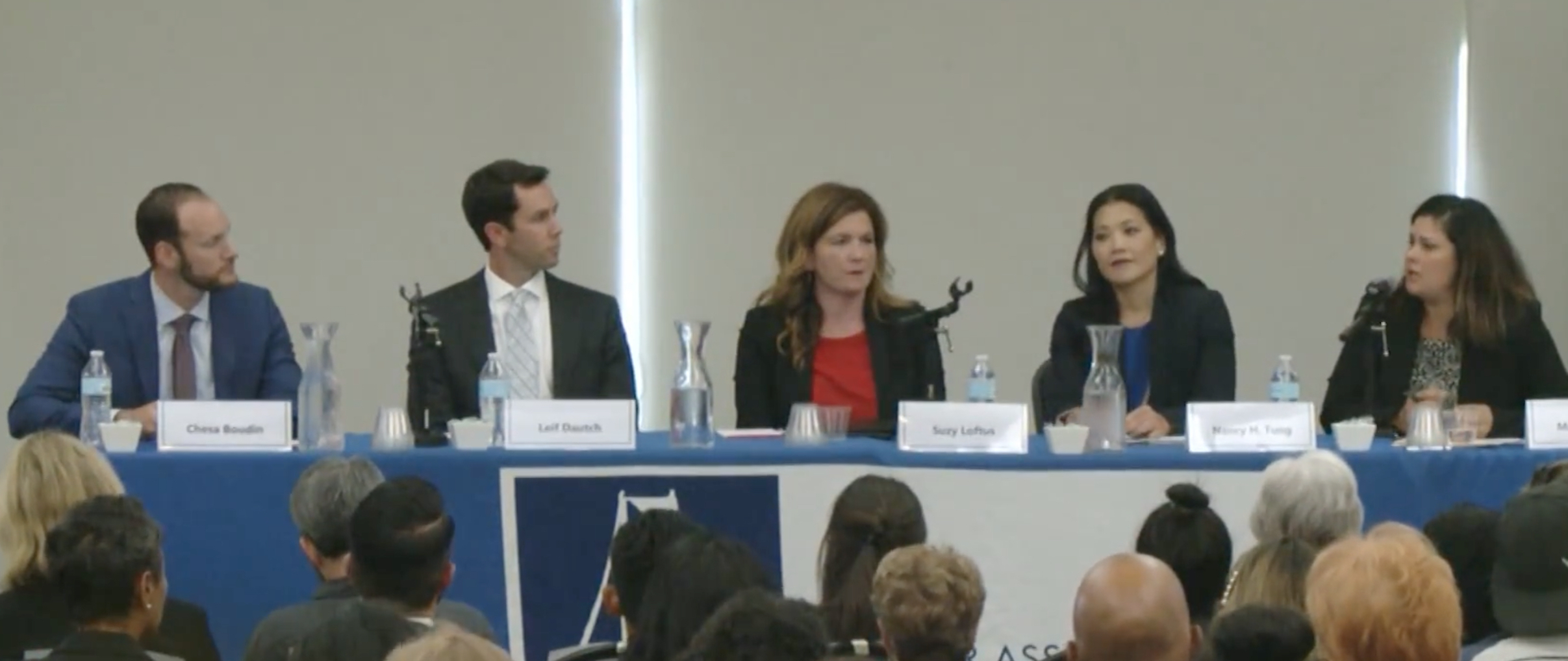
- (From left to right) Chesa Boudin, Leif Dautch, Suzy Loftus, Nancy Tung. Moderator Marisa Lagos (right)
  Chesa Boudin, public defender
- Leif Dautch, prosecutor, former deputy district attorney of San Francisco
- Suzy Loftus, interim district attorney of San Francisco, former police commissioner of San Francisco
- Nancy Tung, prosecutor, deputy district attorney of Alameda County, former deputy attorney general of California

=== Endorsements ===
Chesa Boudin

Federal politicians

- Bernie Sanders, U.S. Senator from Vermont (2007–present), 2020 presidential candidate

District attorneys

- Kim Foxx, state's attorney of Cook County, Illinois (2016–present)
- Larry Krasner, district attorney of Philadelphia (2018–present)
- Rachael Rollins, district attorney of Suffolk County, Massachusetts (2019–present)

Local politicians

- Matt Gonzalez, former president of the San Francisco Board of Supervisors (2003–2005) and running mate of Ralph Nader in the 2008 presidential election

Individuals

- Shaun King, writer, activist
Suzy Loftus

Federal politicians

- Dianne Feinstein, U.S. Senator from California (1992–present), former mayor of San Francisco
- Kamala Harris, U.S. Senator from California (2017–present), 2020 presidential candidate, former district attorney of San Francisco

State politicians

- Gavin Newsom, governor of California (2019–present), former mayor of San Francisco

City officials

- London Breed, mayor of San Francisco (2017–2018; 2018–present)
Nancy Tung

State politicians

- Quentin Kopp, former member of the California State Senate and of the San Francisco Board of Supervisors, candidate for mayor of San Francisco in 1979

District attorneys

- Nancy O'Malley, district attorney of Alameda County, California (2009–present)
Leif Dautch

State politicians

- Fiona Ma, treasurer of California (2019–present), former member of the California State Assembly and of the San Francisco Board of Supervisors

=== Polling ===
Poll source	Date(s) administered	RCV choice	Sample size	Margin of error	Chesa Boudin	Leif Dautch	Suzy Loftus	Nancy Tung	Undecided	Refs
Tulchin Research (Boudin)	October 13–16, 2019	First	400	± 4.9%	21%	10%	18%	11%	40%	

== Results ==
The results of the election are shown in the following tables:

San Francisco district attorney election, 2019
Party	Candidate	Maximum round	Maximum votes	Share in maximum round	Maximum votes First round votes Transfer votes
Nonpartisan	Chesa Boudin	3	86,682	50.83%	
Nonpartisan	Suzy Loftus	3	83,850	49.17%	
Nonpartisan	Nancy Tung	2	46,608	24.97%	
Nonpartisan	Leif Dautch	1	27,021	13.99%	

Round-by-round results
Candidate	Round 1	Round 2	Round 3
Chesa Boudin	68,785	73,530	86,682
Suzy Loftus	59,990	66,489	83,850
Nancy Tung	37,337	46,608	
Leif Dautch	27,021		
Continuing votes	193,133	186,627	170,532
Exhausted ballots	0	6,437	22,409
Over votes	525	594	717
Under votes	12,387	12,387	12,387
Total	206,045	206,045	206,045

== Aftermath ==
Loftus conceded to Boudin on November 9. Since Boudin was seen as by far the most progressive candidate in the race, the result was interpreted as a continuation of a national trend of bold criminal justice reformists elected in large cities, including Larry Krasner in Philadelphia; Rachael Rollins in Boston; and Kim Foxx in Chicago.

Boudin took office on January 8, 2020.
