= William Oberndorf =

American businessman

Bill Oberndorf
- Born: William Ernst Oberndorf
- Education: Williams College (BA); Stanford University (MBA)
- Occupations: Philanthropist, hedge fund manager
- Political party: Republican
- Spouse: Susan Oberndorf

William Ernst Oberndorf is an American businessman and Republican political donor.

== Career ==
Oberndorf attended University School in Cleveland, Ohio, and graduated from Williams College in 1975. He received an MBA from Stanford Graduate School of Business in 1978. Oberndorf was inspired to become an investor by Warren Buffett. In 1989, Oberndorf founded the investment firm SPO Partners. Oberndorf was a major investor in Voyager, which created a literacy curriculum that was implemented by Florida Governor Jeb Bush.

Oberndorf has served on the boards of numerous companies, including Calpine, Aggregates USA, Rosewood Hotels & Resorts, Hotel Equity Funds, Plum Creek Timber, Voyager Learning Company, Taft Broadcasting, and Wometco Cable Television Corporation.

== Other activities ==
Oberndorf is most recently known for funding the recall on San Francisco's District Attorney, Chesa Boudin. Oberndorf and his wife Susan Oberndorf are active philanthropists who have donated millions of dollars to education-related causes and institutions. Oberndorf currently serves as chair of the UCSF Foundation, which raises money to support the University of California, San Francisco’s mission of advancing health worldwide. In 2010, Business Insider named Oberndorf one of the top ten university endowment managers.

The Oberndorfs are strong supporters of school choice and have made a number of large donations to organizations designed to "bring about systemic and sustainable reform by promoting broad-based parental choice that aids low-income families." In 2013, the couple made grants to two Bay Area public charter schools, KIPP Bay Area Schools and Gateway Public Schools, and donated $100,000 to the Foundation for Excellence in Education. Other educational institutions that have received donations from the Oberndorfs include Marquette University, Williams College, and Stanford University.

Oberndorf is a major political donor who has contributed funds to national and California-based initiatives and candidates. Oberndorf was a prominent supporter of California Proposition 32, an effort to reform the political influence of teacher’s unions. In 2016, Oberndorf donated $49,999 to Proposition Q, a ballot measure prohibiting tents on public sidewalks that was passed by voters.

A registered Republican, Oberndorf donated over $1 million to the California Republican Party and its candidates between 2001 and 2011. He was a major backer of Republican presidential candidate Mitt Romney in 2008 and 2012, but ultimately donated to Barack Obama’s campaign prior to the 2008 election. Oberndorf has also donated to U.S. Senator Dianne Feinstein, a Democrat from California.

In 2016, Oberndorf was one of several high-profile Republican donors who refused to support Republican presidential nominee Donald J. Trump. Oberndorf said he would not vote for Trump, telling the New York Times, “If it is Trump vs. Clinton... I will be voting for Hillary.” Earlier in the 2016 presidential cycle, Oberndorf co-hosted two fundraisers for Jeb Bush and played a major role in discouraging Romney from running for president for a third time.

Since 2016, Oberndorf has been a major donor to Republican congressional and Senate candidates as well as associated political action committees. He continued on his past giving to Senate Minority Leader Mitch McConnell by giving another $2 million to McConnell's leadership committee as well as individual contributions directly to candidates.

In 2022, Obendorf donated to a PAC supporting Kyrsten Sinema's 2024 Senate re-election campaign.
