= San Francisco District Attorney's Office =

Legal agency

District Attorney of the City and County of San Francisco
- Seal of San Francisco

- Flag of San Francisco

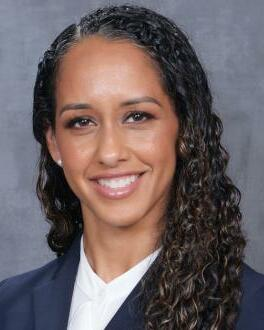
- Incumbent; Brooke Jenkins since July 8, 2022
- Type: District attorney
- Formation: 1856
- First holder: Henry H. Byrne
- Salary: $339,300 (2024)
- Website: sfdistrictattorney.org

The San Francisco District Attorney's Office is the government agency responsible for prosecuting crimes in San Francisco, California, United States, under California state law. The current district attorney is Brooke Jenkins. Occupants of this office have gone on to higher elected offices, including governor of California, United States senator, and vice president of the United States.

== History ==
After the state Consolidation Act of 1856 consolidated San Francisco as a city and county, Henry H. Byrne was elected as the first district attorney. Twenty-seven people have held the title since Byrne.

=== Kamala D. Harris (2004–2011) ===
On January 8, 2004, Kamala Harris became the first female, first Jamaican American, and first Indian American district attorney of San Francisco after having defeated Terence Hallinan. She was the first Indian American district attorney in the United States, and the first Jamaican American district attorney in California. Harris was re-elected in 2007 running unopposed. Subsequently, Harris became Attorney General of California in 2011, U.S. Senator in 2017, Vice President of the United States in 2021, and lost the 2024 United States presidential election to Donald Trump.

=== George Gascón (2011–2019) ===
On January 9, 2011, Gavin Newsom appointed SFPD Chief George Gascón as district attorney to succeed Kamala Harris, who had been elected California attorney general in the November 2010 election. Gascón was subsequently elected in his own right in in November 2011. On October 2, 2018, Gascón announced that he would not seek re-election, citing his mother's health. On October 3, 2019, Gascón announced that he would resign as district attorney on October 18 in order to explore a run for Los Angeles district attorney.

=== 2019 district attorney election ===
After Gascón announced in 2018 that he would not seek re-election, San Francisco anticipated its first open race for district attorney since 1909, with candidates Chesa Boudin, Leif Dautch, Suzy Loftus, and Nancy Tung entering the race. After Gascón announced his resignation in October 2019 prior to the November 2019 election, Mayor London Breed appointed candidate Suzy Loftus as interim district attorney, whom Breed had endorsed in the November 2019 election. Loftus served as interim district attorney from October 19, 2019, until January 8, 2020, when winning candidate Boudin took office.

=== Chesa Boudin (2020–2022) ===
Chesa Boudin was sworn in as district attorney on January 8, 2020. Heavily criticized for criminal justice reform policies, Boudin was the subject of a recall election on June 7, 2022. In the recall election, 55.05% of voters supported removing him from office. Mayor London Breed, who had backed a more moderate Democrat in the 2019 district attorney race, named Brooke Jenkins, a former corporate lawyer and prosecutor in the district attorney's office, as Boudin's replacement.

== List of San Francisco district attorneys ==
District attorney	Tenure
Henry H. Byrne	1856
William K. Osborn	1857
Harvey S. Brown	1858–1861
Nathan Porter	1861–1868
Herry H. Byrne	1868–1872
Daniel J. Murphy	1872–1874
Thomas P. Ryan	1874–1876
Daniel J. Murphy	1876–1880
David L. Smoot	1880–1882
Leonidas E. Pratt	1882
Jeremiah D. Sullivan	1883–1885
John N. Wilson	1885–1887
Edward B. Stonehill	1887–1889
James D. Page	1889–1891
William S. Barnes	1891–1898
Daniel J. Murphy	1899–1900
Lewis Francis Byington	1900–1905
William H. Langdon	1906–1910
Charles Fickert	1910–1920
Matthew Brady	1920–1944
Pat Brown	1944–1951
Thomas C. Lynch	1951–1964
John J. Ferdon	1964–1976
Joseph Freitas Jr.	1976–1980
Arlo Smith	1980–1996
Terence Hallinan	1996–2004
Kamala Harris	2004–2011
George Gascón	2011–2019
Suzy Loftus (interim)	2019–2020
Chesa Boudin	2020–2022
Brooke Jenkins	2022–present
