= Politics of San Francisco =

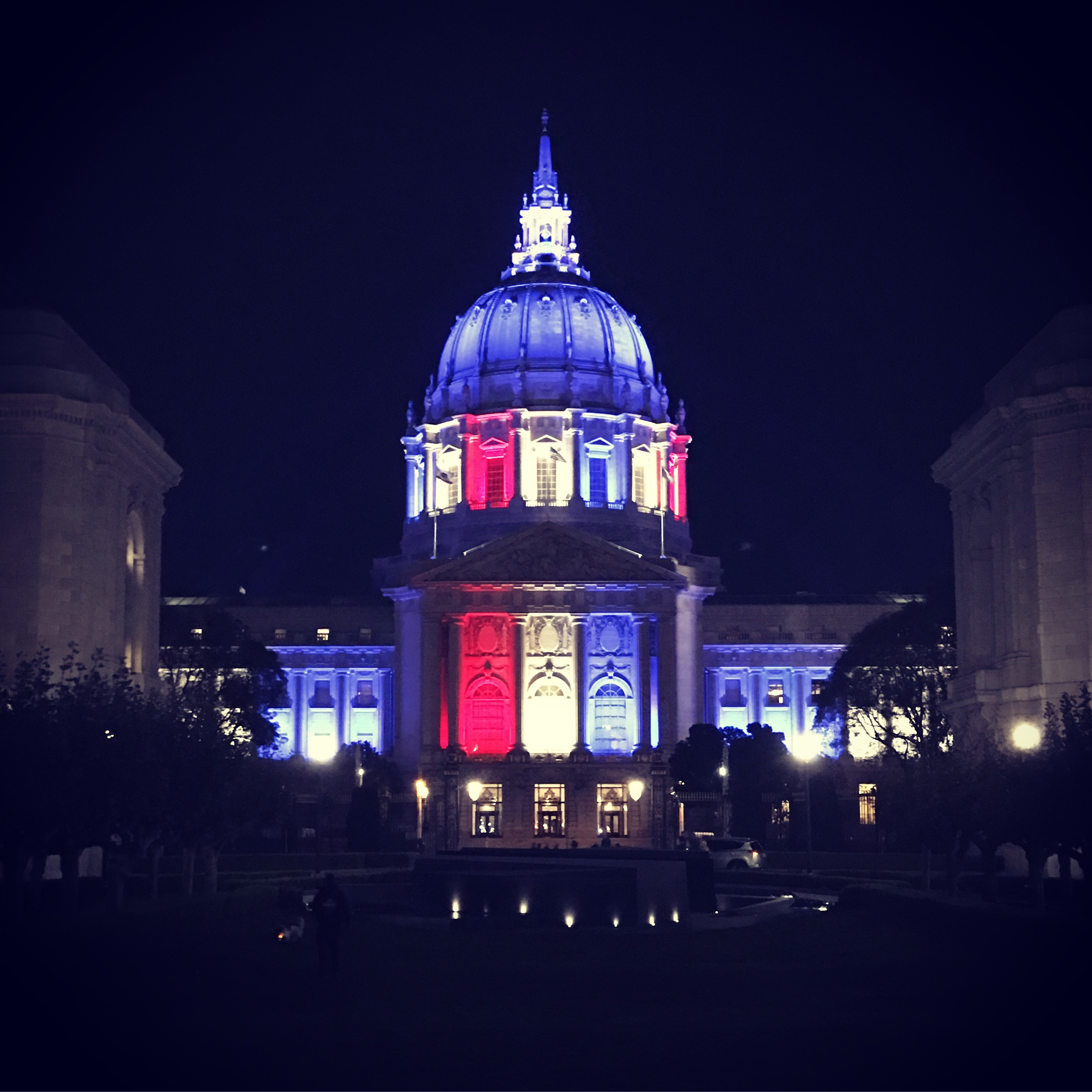
San Francisco City Hall illuminated in commemorative red, white, and blue lighting on Election Day November 6, 2018

Following the social upheavals of the 1960s, San Francisco became one of the centers of progressive activism, with Democrats, and progressives dominating city politics. This continuing trend is also visible in the results of presidential elections; the last Republican president to win San Francisco was Dwight Eisenhower in 1956. Although the fight between Democrats and Republicans has been unequal for the last 40 years, it has become increasingly lopsided, with conservative commentators frequently attacking the city's politics using the ad hominem phrase, "San Francisco values". Because of its heavy liberal leanings, San Francisco has the highest percentage of Democratic voters of any California county as of November 2024. Campaign corruption is monitored by the San Francisco Ethics Commission and violations result in fines up to $5,000 per violation.

== State and federal representation ==
United States presidential election results for San Francisco County, California
Year	Republican		Democratic		Third party(ies)	
Year	No.	%	No.	%	No.	%
1880	19,080	46.27%	21,471	52.06%	688	1.67%
1884	25,509	53.46%	21,202	44.43%	1,008	2.11%
1888	25,708	46.14%	28,699	51.51%	1,310	2.35%
1892	24,416	41.78%	31,022	53.09%	2,997	5.13%
1896	31,041	49.20%	30,649	48.58%	1,396	2.21%
1900	35,208	55.71%	25,212	39.89%	2,782	4.40%
1904	39,816	60.86%	18,027	27.55%	7,584	11.59%
1908	33,184	55.19%	21,260	35.36%	5,680	9.45%
1912	0	0.00%	48,953	48.40%	52,195	51.60%
1916	63,093	42.30%	78,225	52.45%	7,834	5.25%
1920	96,105	65.18%	32,637	22.13%	18,708	12.69%
1924	73,494	47.75%	9,811	6.37%	70,615	45.88%
1928	95,987	49.11%	96,632	49.44%	2,849	1.46%
1932	70,152	31.43%	144,236	64.62%	8,809	3.95%
1936	65,436	24.69%	196,197	74.04%	3,368	1.27%
1940	122,449	39.26%	185,607	59.51%	3,822	1.23%
1944	134,163	38.92%	208,609	60.51%	1,959	0.57%
1948	160,135	45.66%	167,726	47.82%	22,848	6.51%
1952	198,158	52.88%	172,312	45.99%	4,230	1.13%
1956	173,648	51.53%	161,766	48.01%	1,553	0.46%
1960	143,001	41.79%	197,734	57.78%	1,484	0.43%
1964	92,994	28.71%	230,758	71.24%	156	0.05%
1968	100,970	33.66%	177,509	59.18%	21,468	7.16%
1972	127,461	41.82%	170,882	56.07%	6,427	2.11%
1976	103,561	40.31%	133,733	52.06%	19,594	7.63%
1980	80,967	31.87%	133,184	52.43%	39,877	15.70%
1984	90,219	31.44%	193,278	67.35%	3,475	1.21%
1988	72,503	26.14%	201,887	72.78%	3,004	1.08%
1992	57,352	17.80%	233,263	72.40%	31,592	9.80%
1996	45,479	15.66%	209,777	72.24%	35,129	12.10%
2000	51,496	16.10%	241,578	75.54%	26,712	8.35%
2004	54,355	15.21%	296,772	83.02%	6,338	1.77%
2008	52,292	13.66%	322,220	84.16%	8,353	2.18%
2012	47,076	13.03%	301,723	83.53%	12,410	3.44%
2016	37,688	9.29%	345,084	85.04%	23,020	5.67%
2020	56,417	12.72%	378,156	85.26%	8,980	2.02%
2024	62,594	15.53%	323,719	80.33%	16,684	4.14%

In the California State Senate, San Francisco is in the 11th senatorial district, represented by Democrat Scott Wiener. In the California State Assembly, it is split between the 17th Assembly district, represented by Democrat Matt Haney, and the 19th Assembly district, represented by Democrat Catherine Stefani.

In the United States House of Representatives, San Francisco is split between two congressional districts. Most of the city is in the 11th District, represented by Nancy Pelosi (D–San Francisco). A sliver in the southwest is part of the 15th District represented by Kevin Mullin (D–South San Francisco). Pelosi served as the House Speaker from January 3, 2019, to January 3, 2023, a post she also held from 2007 through 2011. She has also held the post of House Minority Leader, from 2003 to 2007 and 2011 to 2019.

== Local politics ==
The city is governed by a mayor and an 11-member Board of Supervisors, both elected using preferential voting. The current mayor is Daniel Lurie.

In the city, a progressive/moderate divide has become the organizing principle of local politics. While the specific policy differences between the two sides are widely disputed, the progressive/moderate formulation remains salient in the local media and in the deep network of political clubs and mutual endorsements that help determine elections.

=== Issues ===
Housing is a frequent topic in San Francisco politics. San Francisco has the highest housing prices in the United States. As of 2018, its median house price was $1.61 million, almost twice the average from five years earlier. Many factors contribute to the housing situation in San Francisco. One of the main reasons for this is the lack of available homes to live in. The Bay Area, from 2011 to 2015, only created 1 home for every 8 jobs created.

San Francisco has some of the most stringent housing laws in the United States. It ranks 3rd among cities in the United States as the hardest city to build in. It has been estimated by San Francisco's chief economist that in order for prices in San Francisco to stabilize, the city would need around 100,000 units to reduce prices.

== Voter statistics ==
- Total Registration and Turnout
  - November 6, 2018
    - Registration 500,516
    - Turnout 345,806
  - June 5, 2018
    - Registration 481,991
    - Turnout 253,583
  - November 8, 2016
    - Registration 513,573
    - Turnout 414,528
  - June 7, 2016
    - Registration 468,238
    - Turnout 264,993
  - November 3, 2015
    - Registration 446,828
    - Turnout 203,069
  - November 4, 2014
    - Registration 436,019
    - Turnout 231,214
  - June 3, 2014
    - Registration 435,757
    - Turnout 129,399
  - November 5, 2013
    - Registration 440,037
    - Turnout 128,937
  - November 6, 2012
    - Registration 502,841
    - Turnout 364,875
  - June 5, 2012
    - Registration 470,668
    - Turnout 145,105

Total population	797,983	
Registered voters (Note: Percentage of registered voters with respect to total population. Percentages of party members with respect to registered voters follow.)	497,663	62.4%
Democratic	276,855	55.6%
Republican	42,922	8.6%
Democratic–Republican spread	+233,933	+47.0%
Independent	8,918	1.8%
Green	8,215	1.7%
Libertarian	3,028	0.6%
Peace and Freedom	1,727	0.3%
Americans Elect	23	0.0%
Other	1,284	0.3%
No party preference	154,691	31.1%

== See also ==
- Gerald Ford assassination attempt in San Francisco
- San Francisco Public Pressure Groups
