= Suzy Loftus =

Interim San Francisco District Attorney (2019–2020)

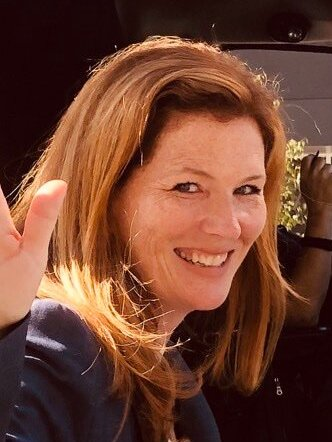
- Loftus in 2019

District Attorney of San Francisco
- Interim; October 4, 2019 – January 8, 2020
- Appointed by: London Breed
- Preceded by: George Gascón
- Succeeded by: Chesa Boudin

Personal details
- Born: Suzanne Theresa Loftus
- Party: Democratic
- Education: Santa Clara University (BA); University of San Francisco (JD)

Suzanne Theresa Loftus is an American attorney who served as interim San Francisco district attorney, nominated by Mayor London Breed after the resignation of George Gascón. Loftus ran in the 2019 San Francisco District Attorney election, losing narrowly to criminal justice reform advocate Chesa Boudin.

== Early life and education ==
Loftus earned a Bachelor of Arts degree in political science from Santa Clara University and a Juris Doctor from the University of San Francisco School of Law.

== Career ==
Prior to serving as interim San Francisco district attorney, Loftus was president of the San Francisco Police Commission and served as General Counsel of the California Department of Justice. She also served as Assistant Attorney General under Kamala Harris. Loftus went on to serve as CEO of the Center for Youth Wellness, a non-profit family health and wellness center in the India Basin neighborhood of San Francisco. Since 2023, Loftus has been the TikTok's head of U.S. Trust and Safety.

On October 4, 2019, Loftus was nominated to serve as Interim San Francisco district attorney. In the 2019 San Francisco District Attorney election, Loftus and Boudin emerged as frontrunners. Loftus, viewed as more moderate than Boudin, was endorsed by Governor Gavin Newsom, Lieutenant Governor Eleni Kounalakis, U.S. Senators Dianne Feinstein and Kamala Harris, and numerous members of the California delegation to congress.

San Francisco elections utilize a ranked-choice voting system, where candidates who receive the fewest votes are eliminated until a winner is selected. Loftus lost to Boudin in a close race, receiving 49.17 percent of votes cast to his 50.83 percent. Loftus continued to serve in an interim basis until Boudin was sworn in on January 8, 2020.

Loftus was a candidate for a seat on the San Francisco Democratic County Central Committee. The election, coinciding with California's presidential primary, was held on March 3, 2020, and open to registered Democrats and "no party preference" voters who choose the Democratic ballot.
