= 2007 San Francisco general election =

General elections were held on November 6, 2007, in San Francisco, California. The elections included those for San Francisco mayor, district attorney, and sheriff, and eleven San Francisco ballot measures.

The November 2007 election had one of the lowest turnouts in San Francisco history. The final turnout was 35.62%.

The complete tally of election results faced significant delays due to problems with the city's electronic voting machines, which had been identified in September; California Secretary of State Debra Bowen ordered that the 561 machines at polling sites not be used to tabulate votes.

== District attorney ==
One-term incumbent and future Vice President Kamala Harris ran unopposed and was assured re-election for a second term. It was the first time since 1991 that the race for San Francisco district attorney was uncontested. In the final tally, she received 114,561 votes, which was 98.5% of the total.

2007 San Francisco district attorney election
| Candidate | Votes | % |
|---|---|---|
| Kamala Harris (incumbent) | 114,561 | 98.50 |
| Write-in | 1,744 | 1.50 |
| Invalid or blank votes | 33,160 | 22.19 |
| Total votes | 149,465 | 100.00 |
| Turnout | {{{votes}}} | 35.62% |

== Sheriff ==
Seven-term incumbent Michael Hennessey won reelection, continuing the longest tenure in California for an elected sheriff. He received 95,948 votes, which was 73.69% of the total.

Final results below:

2007 San Francisco sheriff election
| Candidate | Votes | % |
|---|---|---|
| Michael Hennessey (incumbent) | 95,948 | 73.69 |
| David Wong | 34,031 | 26.14 |
| Write-in | 221 | 0.17 |
| Invalid or blank votes | 19,265 | 12.89 |
| Total votes | 149,465 | 100.00 |
| Turnout | {{{votes}}} | 35.62% |

== Propositions ==
Nine out of eleven ballot measures were approved by voters in San Francisco City and County.

Note: "City" refers to the San Francisco municipal government.

=== Proposition A ===

Proposition A would give the San Francisco Municipal Transportation Agency (SFMTA) more authority and funding while requiring the SFMTA to create a Climate Action Plan, and forbidding the increase the maximum number of parking spaces for new private development projects except with supermajority approval of the San Francisco Board of Supervisors.

Proposition A
| Choice | Votes | % |
|---|---|---|
| For | 80,786 | 55.66 |
| Against | 64,346 | 44.34 |
| Total | 145,132 | 100.00 |
| Valid votes | 145,132 | 97.10 |
| Invalid/blank votes | 4,333 | 2.90 |
| Total votes | 149,465 | 100.00 |
| Registered voters/turnout | | 35.62 |

=== Proposition B ===

Proposition B would prohibit City-chartered board and committee members from serving as holdovers 60 days after their terms expire.

Proposition B
| Choice | Votes | % |
|---|---|---|
| For | 96,034 | 71.16 |
| Against | 38,915 | 28.84 |
| Total | 134,949 | 100.00 |
| Valid votes | 134,949 | 90.29 |
| Invalid/blank votes | 14,516 | 9.71 |
| Total votes | 149,465 | 100.00 |
| Registered voters/turnout | | 35.62 |

=== Proposition C ===

Proposition C would require all measures sponsored by the Mayor and Board of Supervisors to be submitted for a public hearing before the Board of Supervisors.

Proposition C
| Choice | Votes | % |
|---|---|---|
| For | 94,939 | 68.20 |
| Against | 44,258 | 31.80 |
| Total | 139,197 | 100.00 |
| Valid votes | 139,197 | 93.13 |
| Invalid/blank votes | 10,268 | 6.87 |
| Total votes | 149,465 | 100.00 |
| Registered voters/turnout | | 35.62 |

=== Proposition D ===
Proposition D would renew the Library Preservation Fund and allow the Fund to be used to improve and maintain library facilities.

Proposition D
| Choice | Votes | % |
|---|---|---|
| For | 105,328 | 74.47 |
| Against | 36,102 | 25.53 |
| Total | 141,430 | 100.00 |
| Valid votes | 141,430 | 94.62 |
| Invalid/blank votes | 8,035 | 5.38 |
| Total votes | 149,465 | 100.00 |
| Registered voters/turnout | | 35.62 |

=== Proposition E ===

Proposition E would require the Mayor to appear before the Board of Supervisors monthly for formal policy discussions.

Proposition E
| Choice | Votes | % |
|---|---|---|
| For | 70,166 | 48.59 |
| Against | 74,253 | 51.41 |
| Total | 144,419 | 100.00 |
| Valid votes | 144,419 | 96.62 |
| Invalid/blank votes | 5,046 | 3.38 |
| Total votes | 149,465 | 100.00 |
| Registered voters/turnout | | 35.62 |

=== Proposition F ===

Proposition F would allow the Board of Supervisors to permit airport police officers who served before December 27, 1997, to switch from the California Public Employees' Retirement System (CalPERS) to the San Francisco Employee Retirement System.

Proposition F
| Choice | Votes | % |
|---|---|---|
| For | 69,637 | 51.60 |
| Against | 65,321 | 48.40 |
| Total | 134,958 | 100.00 |
| Valid votes | 134,958 | 90.29 |
| Invalid/blank votes | 14,507 | 9.71 |
| Total votes | 149,465 | 100.00 |
| Registered voters/turnout | | 35.62 |

=== Proposition G ===

Proposition G would establish the Golden Gate Park Stables Matching Fund for the purpose of renovating, repairing, and maintaining the horse stables at Golden Gate Park.

Proposition G
| Choice | Votes | % |
|---|---|---|
| For | 77,340 | 55.37 |
| Against | 62,331 | 44.63 |
| Total | 139,671 | 100.00 |
| Valid votes | 139,671 | 93.45 |
| Invalid/blank votes | 9,794 | 6.55 |
| Total votes | 149,465 | 100.00 |
| Registered voters/turnout | | 35.62 |

=== Proposition H ===

Proposition H would increase the number of parking spaces developers can build and ease restrictions on building new parking spaces for buildings.

Proposition H
| Choice | Votes | % |
|---|---|---|
| For | 46,632 | 33.09 |
| Against | 94,277 | 66.91 |
| Total | 140,909 | 100.00 |
| Valid votes | 140,909 | 94.28 |
| Invalid/blank votes | 8,556 | 5.72 |
| Total votes | 149,465 | 100.00 |
| Registered voters/turnout | | 35.62 |

=== Proposition I ===

Proposition I would establish the Office for Small Business as a City department and require it to operate a Small Business Assistance Center to provide information to small businesses.

Proposition I
| Choice | Votes | % |
|---|---|---|
| For | 80,865 | 59.15 |
| Against | 55,855 | 40.85 |
| Total | 136,720 | 100.00 |
| Valid votes | 136,720 | 91.47 |
| Invalid/blank votes | 12,745 | 8.53 |
| Total votes | 149,465 | 100.00 |
| Registered voters/turnout | | 35.62 |

=== Proposition J ===

Proposition J would make it City policy to offer free Wi-Fi throughout San Francisco via contract with a private provider.

Proposition J
| Choice | Votes | % |
|---|---|---|
| For | 86,451 | 62.25 |
| Against | 52,428 | 37.75 |
| Total | 138,879 | 100.00 |
| Valid votes | 138,879 | 92.92 |
| Invalid/blank votes | 10,586 | 7.08 |
| Total votes | 149,465 | 100.00 |
| Registered voters/turnout | | 35.62 |

=== Proposition K ===

Proposition K would make it city policy that the city would not increase the amount of general advertising signs on street furniture and city-owned buildings.

Proposition K
| Choice | Votes | % |
|---|---|---|
| For | 86,250 | 61.85 |
| Against | 53,195 | 38.15 |
| Total | 139,445 | 100.00 |
| Valid votes | 139,445 | 93.30 |
| Invalid/blank votes | 10,020 | 6.70 |
| Total votes | 149,465 | 100.00 |
| Registered voters/turnout | | 35.62 |
