= List of political advocacy groups in San Francisco =

San Francisco political advocacy groups are organizations that seek to influence elections, public policy, and government decisions in San Francisco, California. They include electoral organizations, labor unions, housing and tenant organizations, political clubs, business associations, and issue-based advocacy groups. Their activities include candidate endorsements, voter guides, campaign financing, public education, and organizing participation in government decisions.

== Political and electoral advocacy organizations ==
=== Abundant SF ===
Abundant SF is a political advocacy organization founded by technology entrepreneur Zack Rosen. The organization supports increased housing construction, transportation improvements, and changes to local government policy.

=== Blueprint for a Better San Francisco ===
Blueprint for a Better San Francisco is a political advocacy and civic engagement initiative launched in June 2025 following the merger of Neighbors for a Better San Francisco and TogetherSF. The organization advocates for changes to city government, public safety policies, and the delivery of municipal services.

=== GrowSF ===
GrowSF is a political advocacy organization founded in 2020 by Steven Buss and Sachin Agarwal. It advocates for increased housing construction, expanded police staffing, substance-use treatment, and changes to municipal government.

=== Neighbors for a Better San Francisco ===
Neighbors for a Better San Francisco is a political advocacy and campaign-financing organization founded in 2020 by Jay Cheng and Mary Jung. It has supported candidates and ballot measures associated with public safety, criminal justice, and local government policy. Between 2020 and 2024, the organization spent at least $8.7 million on San Francisco political campaigns, according to Mission Local.

In 2024, the organization was assessed a $54,000 ethics penalty related to disclosure of payments associated with the Boudin recall campaign. It merged operations with TogetherSF in 2025, and co-founder Jay Cheng stepped down as executive director in April 2026.

=== San Francisco Rising ===
San Francisco Rising is a community organization that advocates for policies affecting working-class residents and communities of color.

=== San Francisco League of Pissed Off Voters ===
San Francisco League of Pissed Off Voters is a progressive electoral advocacy organization.

== Housing and tenant advocacy organizations ==
=== San Francisco YIMBY ===
San Francisco YIMBY is a pro-housing political advocacy organization associated with the YIMBY movement. It supports zoning changes that permit additional housing, streamlined housing approvals, and increased residential construction.

=== Housing Action Coalition ===
Housing Action Coalition is a Bay Area organization advocating for increased housing production and changes to development approval processes. The group supports increased residential development and efforts to address housing shortages and displacement.

=== San Francisco Tenants Union ===
San Francisco Tenants Union is a tenant advocacy organization established in 1970. It supports tenant rights, the preservation and expansion of affordable housing, and protections for renters.

== Labor organizations ==
=== San Francisco Labor Council ===
San Francisco Labor Council is a federation of labor unions affiliated with the AFL–CIO.

=== SEIU Local 1021 ===
SEIU Local 1021 is a labor union representing public-sector and nonprofit workers in Northern California, including employees of the City and County of San Francisco. It advocates for collective bargaining, employee compensation, workplace protections, and public services.

=== United Educators of San Francisco ===
United Educators of San Francisco is a labor union representing teachers and other education employees in the San Francisco Unified School District. It advocates for public education policies and educator working conditions.

== Political parties and Democratic clubs ==
=== San Francisco Democratic Party ===
The San Francisco Democratic Party is the county organization of the Democratic Party, represented by the Democratic County Central Committee.

=== Harvey Milk LGBTQ Democratic Club ===
The Harvey Milk LGBTQ Democratic Club is a progressive Democratic political organization associated with LGBTQ political advocacy.

=== Alice B. Toklas LGBTQ Democratic Club ===
The Alice B. Toklas LGBTQ Democratic Club is a Democratic political organization advocating for LGBTQ rights, human rights, and social and economic equality.

=== San Francisco Women's Political Committee ===
San Francisco Women's Political Committee is a political organization.

=== San Francisco Young Democrats ===
San Francisco Young Democrats is a Democratic political organization.

=== San Francisco Green Party ===
The San Francisco Green Party is the local organization of the Green Party of California.

== Transportation and environmental advocacy organizations ==
=== San Francisco Transit Riders ===
San Francisco Transit Riders is a public transportation advocacy organization supporting funding, service improvements, and accessibility for Muni and other public transportation.

=== San Francisco League of Conservation Voters ===
San Francisco League of Conservation Voters is an environmental political organization.

=== Sierra Club San Francisco Bay Chapter ===
Sierra Club San Francisco Bay Chapter is a regional environmental organization.

=== SPUR ===
SPUR, originally the San Francisco Planning and Urban Research Association, is a regional public-policy organization focused on urban planning, housing, transportation, economic development, and government policy.

== Education and parent advocacy organizations ==
=== SF Parents Action ===
SF Parents Action is a political advocacy organization associated with the San Francisco Parent Coalition. Its stated priorities include school district accountability, academic outcomes, and representation of public school families in education policy.

== Business and economic advocacy organizations ==
=== sf.citi ===
sf.citi is an advocacy organization associated with the tech industry.

== Civic and voter education organizations ==
=== League of Women Voters of San Francisco ===
League of Women Voters of San Francisco is a nonpartisan civic organization that promotes voter participation, voter education, and public understanding of government. Its policy positions cover issues including voting rights, housing, transportation, the environment, and government administration.

== Former organizations ==
=== TogetherSF ===
TogetherSF was a political advocacy and civic engagement organization founded in 2020 and financially supported by venture capitalist Michael Moritz. It advocated for changes to city government, public safety policies, responses to homelessness and substance use, and economic revitalization.

== See also ==
- Politics of San Francisco
- Politics in the San Francisco Bay Area
- San Francisco Board of Supervisors
