= Seal of San Francisco =

Seal of the City and County of San Francisco
- The seal of the City and County of San Francisco.
- Armiger: City and County of San Francisco
- Adopted: 1859; 167 years ago

The Seal of the City and County of San Francisco includes a shield, crest, supporters and a motto, ringed with the municipality's name.

== History ==
That a corporate seal of the City and County of San Francisco bearing upon its face: A shield supported by a miner on the left and a sailor on the right, with a device of a steamship passing the Golden Gate. At the foot of the supporters emblems of commerce, navigation, and mining. Crest, Phoenix issuing from flames. Motto, "oro en Paz, Fierro en Guerra" (Gold in Peace, Iron in War). Around the margins the words, "Seal of the City and County of San Francisco."

— Ordinance #39, Board of Supervisors (March 26, 1900)

The current seal was adopted in 1859 by the Board of Supervisors, and superseded a similar seal that had been adopted seven years earlier. The shield shows the Golden Gate and the hills on each side as it looked in 1859, and a paddlewheel steamship entering San Francisco Bay.

Above the shield is a crest with a phoenix, the legendary Greek bird rising from the ashes. The shield is flanked by two supporters: a miner, in dexter, holding a shovel; and a sailor, in sinister, holding a sextant. Both figures wear 1850s period clothing. At the feet of the supporters are a plow and anchor, emblems of commerce and navigation. Below the shield is a motto that reads "Oro en paz, fierro en guerra", which is Spanish for "Gold in peace, iron in war".

The official de jure description of the seal given by the San Franciscan government does not assign any specific colors to be used on renditions of the seal.
