= The San Francisco Standard =

American Newspaper

- Format: Online
- Founders: Michael Moritz; Griffin Gaffney
- Editor-in-chief: Kevin Delaney
- Founded: 2021; 5 years ago
- Language: English
- Headquarters: San Francisco, California
- Country: United States
- Website: sfstandard.com

The San Francisco Standard is an online news organization based in San Francisco, California, launched in 2021 and funded in part by the billionaire venture capitalist Michael Moritz of Sequoia Capital. Moritz co-founded it with Griffin Gaffney.

== History ==
The San Francisco Standard was originally Here/Say Media, a project of Civic Action Labs, a 501(c)4 nonprofit. Some journalism ethicists were concerned about the organization's structure (nearly all nonprofit journalism organizations are 501(c)3 nonprofits) and refusal to disclose its donors. In March 2021, Here/Say disclosed on its website that it was funded by Crankstart, a foundation funded by Michael Moritz and Harriet Heyman. In August 2021, Here/Say wrote that it had incorporated into an independent, for-profit entity, and that Moritz and Heyman had invested $10 million. The San Francisco Standard was co-founded by Moritz and Griffin Gaffney.

In November 2021, Here/Say Media announced that the organization had changed its name to The San Francisco Standard.

In December 2021, The Standard partnered with ABC 7 to cover the 2022 California's 17th State Assembly district special election.

The San Francisco Standard's voter poll was featured in news coverage on the recall election of progressive San Francisco District Attorney Chesa Boudin. In May 2022, The Standard published a story showing that Boudin's office secured three convictions for drug dealing in 2021, whereas Boudin's predecessor George Gascón oversaw over 90 convictions in 2018. Instead, Boudin's office emphasized convictions for a different crime which would not penalize foreign nationals with deportation or threats to naturalization. The story generated secondary coverage in the National Review, Washington Monthly, and Courthouse News Service.

In October 2022, editor-in-chief Jonathan Weber resigned, citing differences with Gaffney.

In June 2025, The Standard acquired the online publication Charter, with Kevin Delaney as The Standard's editor-in-chief.

In September 2026, The San Francisco Standard and Gaffney were sued for wrongful discharge, gender discrimination, and gender harassment. Included in the allegations from the former employee: "Gaffney made multiple sexually explicit comments in Slack conversations with Ms. Ryan, including suggesting he have an affair with the significant other of one of The Standard’s prominent business partners" and "Gaffney wrote that it takes 'a hot ass' to close a deal. He commented that Ms. Ryan and others should have gym memberships for this reason" and "he referenced the Night Work album cover by the Scissor Sisters, which displays a sexually explicit closeup of a male dancer’s backside. Mr. Gaffney suggested they recreate this cover with this person’s 'ass' and again suggested he should have an affair with this person" and "Gaffney made critical remarks about a prominent female leader in tech."
