= Chesa Boudin =

29th District Attorney of San Francisco (2020–2022, recalled)

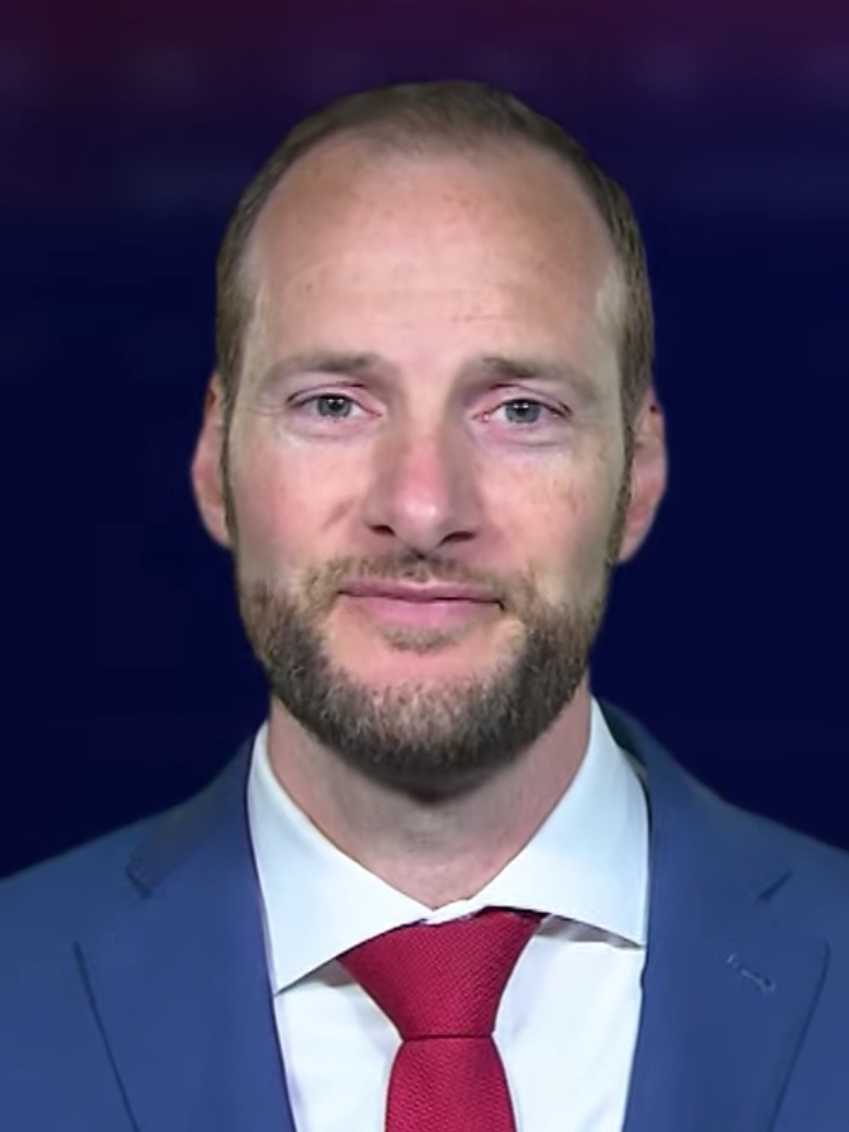
- Boudin in 2019

29th District Attorney of San Francisco
- In office January 8, 2020 – July 8, 2022
- Preceded by: George Gascón; Suzy Loftus (interim)
- Succeeded by: Brooke Jenkins

Personal details
- Born: August 21, 1980 (age 46) New York City, U.S.
- Party: Democratic
- Spouse: Valerie Block
- Children: 1
- Parents: David Gilbert (father); Kathy Boudin (mother)
- Relatives: Bill Ayers (adoptive father); Bernardine Dohrn (adoptive mother); I.F. Stone (great uncle); Louis B. Boudin (great-great-grand-uncle); Leonard Boudin (grandfather); Michael Boudin (uncle); Rachel DeWoskin (sister-in-law)
- Education: Yale University (BA, JD); St Antony's College, Oxford (MSc)

Chesa Boudin (/ˈtʃeɪsə buːˈdiːn/, CHAY-sə boo-DEEN; born August 21, 1980) is an American lawyer who served as the 29th district attorney of San Francisco from January 8, 2020 to July 8, 2022. He is a member of the Democratic Party.

Boudin graduated from Yale University and was a Rhodes Scholar at St Antony's College, Oxford. After obtaining his Juris Doctor from Yale Law School in 2011, Boudin clerked for two federal judges and became a deputy public defender in San Francisco.

Boudin was elected San Francisco district attorney in 2019. In an effort to reduce incarceration, he implemented criminal justice reform policies such as bail reform and alternatives to prosecution and sentencing. However, he was heavily criticized for mismanagement of the office and for his perceived softness on crime. Boudin was the subject of a recall election on June 7, 2022. The recall election was successful, as 55% of the electorate voted to remove him from office.

== Early life and education ==
Boudin was born in New York City to Jewish parents, Kathy Boudin and David Gilbert. Boudin and Gilbert were Weather Underground members who were arrested when Boudin was 14 months old. The two were later incarcerated for the felony murder of two police officers and a security guard in the 1981 Brink's robbery in Rockland County, New York. His mother was sentenced to 20 years to life, and his father was sentenced to 75 years to life.

After his parents were incarcerated, Boudin was adopted and raised in Hyde Park, Chicago, by fellow Weather Underground members Bill Ayers and Bernardine Dohrn. Boudin reports that he did not learn to read until age nine. Kathy Boudin was released under parole supervision in 2003, when Boudin was 23 years old. Gilbert was released in 2021.

Boudin descends from a long left-wing lineage. His great-grand-uncle, Louis B. Boudin, was a Marxist theoretician and author of a two-volume history of the Supreme Court's influence on American government, and his grandfather Leonard Boudin was an attorney who represented controversial clients, such as Fidel Castro and Paul Robeson. His grand-uncle Isidor Feinstein Stone ("I. F. Stone") was an independent progressive journalist.

His uncle, Michael Boudin, was a well-regarded judge on the United States Court of Appeals for the First Circuit who did not share his family's penchant for leftism. Boudin was appointed by George H.W. Bush.

Boudin attended University of Chicago Laboratory Schools and Yale College. In 2003 he entered St Antony's College, Oxford, on a Rhodes Scholarship. At Oxford, he earned a Master of Science in forced migration in 2004. He earned his Juris Doctor from Yale Law School in 2011 and began work for the San Francisco Public Defender's Office as a Liman fellow in 2012.

== Early career ==
Before law school, Boudin traveled to Venezuela and served as a translator in the Venezuelan Presidential Palace during the administration of Hugo Chavez.

After law school, from 2011 to 2012, Boudin served as a law clerk for M. Margaret McKeown on the United States Court of Appeals for the Ninth Circuit. He was a 2012–2013 Liman Fellow at the San Francisco Public Defender's Office, and in 2013 and 2014, he clerked for Charles Breyer on the United States District Court for the Northern District of California. In 2015, Boudin began working full time at the San Francisco Public Defender's Office as a deputy public defender. While there, he argued on behalf of the office's clients that California's bail system is unconstitutional, leading to the published case In re Kenneth Humphrey, in which the state's First District Court of Appeals held that judges must give consideration to a defendant's ability to pay before setting bail.

Boudin also serves on the board of the Civil Rights Corps, a national non-profit organization, and is on the board of Restore Justice, a non-profit based in California.

Boudin translated Understanding the Bolivarian Revolution: Hugo Chávez Speaks with Marta Harnecker into English, co-edited Letters from Young Activists: Today's Young Rebels Speak Out, and co-wrote The Venezuelan Revolution: 100 Questions – 100 Answers. His book, Gringo: A Coming of Age in Latin America, was released in April 2009 by Charles Scribner's Sons. The book received mixed reviews.

== San Francisco District Attorney ==
=== 2019 election ===
Boudin was elected San Francisco district attorney in the 2019 election, defeating interim district attorney Suzy Loftus. Boudin campaigned for the office on a decarceration platform of eliminating cash bail, establishing a unit to re-evaluate wrongful convictions, and refusing to assist Immigration and Customs Enforcement (ICE) with raids and arrests. The San Francisco Police Officers Association (SFPOA) and other law enforcement groups spent $650,000 in an unsuccessful effort to defeat Boudin. Attorney General William Barr criticized Boudin and like-minded DAs, accusing them of undermining the police, letting criminals off the hook, and endangering public safety. In an interview during the COVID-19 pandemic, Boudin questioned whether the nation "can safely continue the national system of mass incarceration. Why do we need to take people to jail for non-violent offenses if what they really need is drug treatment or mental health services?"

=== Tenure ===
Boudin was sworn in as San Francisco district attorney by San Francisco mayor London Breed on January 8, 2020 at the Herbst Theatre. Shortly afterward, Boudin restructured the management team by firing seven prosecutors.

On January 26, Boudin suspended the process of prosecuting Jamaica Hampton, a man who was shot and seriously injured in an altercation with police, during which he was captured in body camera footage striking an officer with a liquor bottle in San Francisco's Mission District. The charges were pulled without prejudice, which allowed them to be refiled at a later date. Alex Bastian, a spokesman for the office, stated that this was to avoid a conflict between the prosecution of Hampton and the investigation and potential prosecution of the officer, who could potentially be charged for the shooting. The police union criticized the decision as "giving criminals a green light" to attack police officers. The District Attorney’s Office ultimately charged Hampton with assault with a deadly weapon and other felonies related to the incident on April 29, 2021.

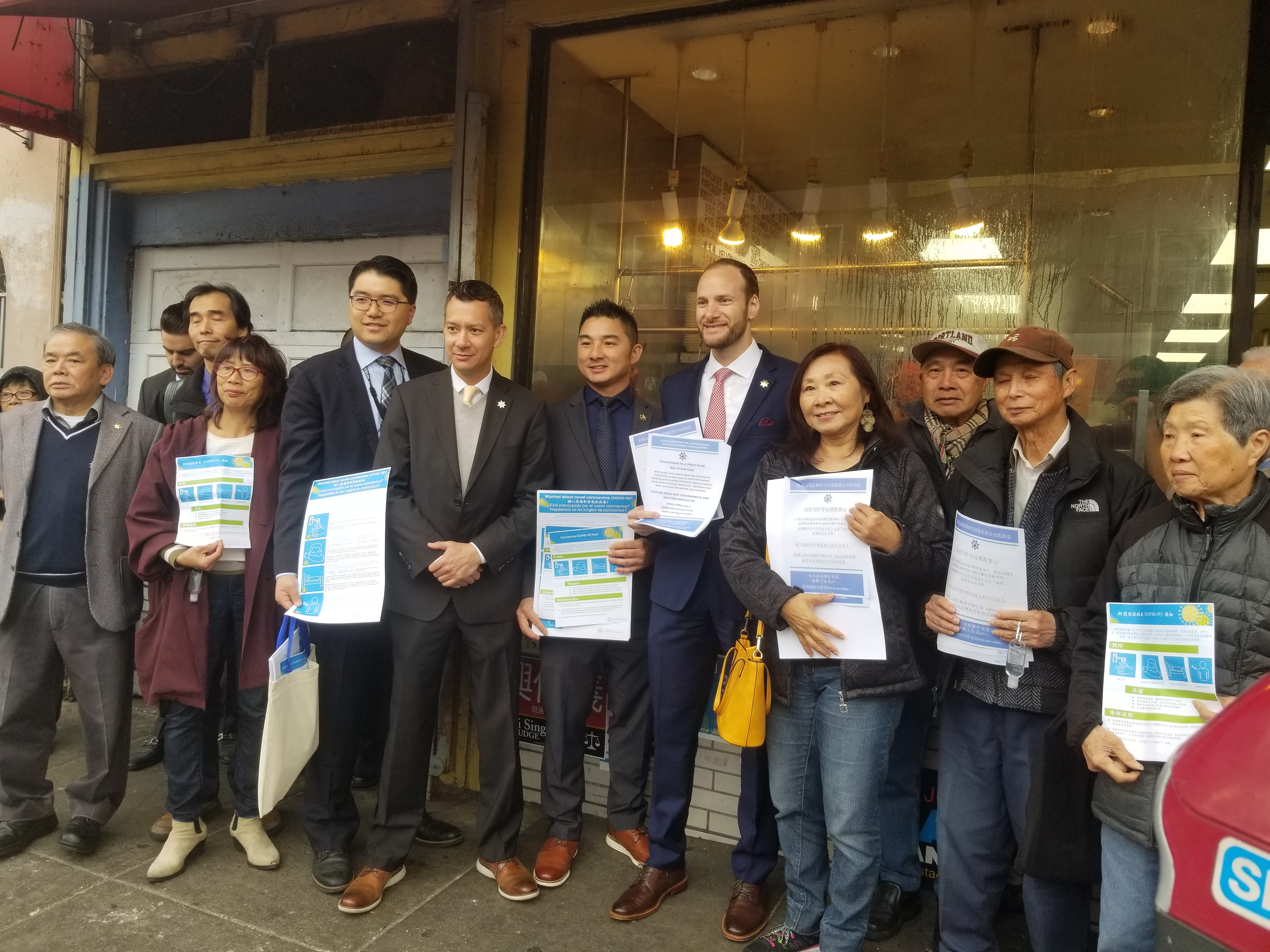
Boudin passing out flyers in Portola, San Francisco during the COVID-19 pandemic in San Francisco

Boudin announced on February 28 that his office would no longer seek charges for contraband found during "pretextual" traffic stops and would not charge status enhancements that increase jail sentences, such as those imposed for gang membership or for having three strikes, with the intent of diminishing racial disparities in policing and sentencing.

In March 2020, Boudin charged 20-year-old Dwayne Grayson with elder abuse after he filmed 56-year-old Jonathan Amerson in February 2020 swinging a metal bar at an elderly Asian man in Bayview–Hunters Point, San Francisco and stealing his aluminum cans. Amerson was charged with elder abuse and robbery. The video later went viral online. Boudin dropped charges against Dwayne Grayson after a spokesperson in Boudin's office said the victim expressed his intent to pursue restorative justice.

On April 9, 2020, Boudin, Mayor London Breed, and San Francisco's Human Services Agency announced that they had acquired 20 temporary housing units for survivors of domestic violence from the city's largest landlord, Veritas Investments, during the 2020 stay-at-home orders in San Francisco during the COVID-19 pandemic in San Francisco. Boudin also announced partnerships with Lyft and Airbnb to provide transportation and temporary housing services to survivors during the pandemic.

Boudin's office launched the Economic Crimes Against Workers Unit, which is led by Assistant District Attorney Scott Stillman, in April 2020. In June 2020, Boudin and the unit filed a motion against food delivery service DoorDash, alleging the company illegally classifies its delivery workers as independent contractors. DoorDash argued that the suit would "disrupt the essential services Dashers provide" and threaten their "flexible earning opportunities". This followed similar suits against gig companies Uber and Lyft by other public attorneys in California such as Xavier Becerra and Dennis Herrera.

==== Federal civil rights lawsuit ====
On January 24, 2022, the Alliance of Asian American Justice filed a federal civil rights lawsuit against the San Francisco District Attorney's office on behalf of 69-year old Ahn Lê. The lawsuit alleged that Lê was the victim of a baseball bat assault by a father and teenage son in November 2019 and that his rights as a victim of violent assault were denied when the sentencing of his attackers failed to consult him under Marsy's Law.

SFist noted that Lê was a contributor to a neighborhood newspaper, the Marina Times, "a virulently anti-Boudin publication."

Four days later, on January 28, 2022, the San Francisco Chronicle reported that along with multiple emails to Lê asking if he wanted to testify, "a victim advocate from the office documented that she reached out to the victim, Anh Lê, more than two dozen times." The Chronicle and SFist also reported that the perpetrator of the attack was using a wheelchair, the teen described by Lê's lawsuit was an 11 year old, and the baseball bat was actually made of plastic.

Ahn Lê dropped his lawsuit on March 1, 2022.

==== Decarceration ====
Boudin's first policy as district attorney was the implementation of a diversion program for persons charged with misdemeanors or nonviolent felonies who are primary caregiver parents of minor children, in accordance with SB394. The bill, which was authored by State Senator Nancy Skinner, was signed into law by Gavin Newsom in October 2019. If accepted into the program, the police would suspend criminal proceedings for up to 24 months, allowing the defendant to undergo various classes and training. After completing the program, the court would drop their charges. It is similar to the mental health and drug diversion program in San Francisco. It is supposed to reduce trauma for children who would have otherwise had a parent incarcerated. Critics have raised concerns about potential loopholes for abusers and sexual offenders.

In January 2020, he eliminated cash bail and replaced it with a "risk-based system", in which prosecutors evaluate whether or not a defendant poses a threat to public safety as a condition for their pretrial release. John Raphling, a senior researcher at the Human Rights Watch, praised the decision, stating that bail and pretrial incarceration has been used "as leverage to pressure people to plead guilty regardless of actual guilt." Conversely, Tony Montoya, president of the SFPOA, condemned the decision, arguing that the risk-based system is an "arbitrary math equation" and that the change would create a "criminal justice revolving door".

In March 2020, at the onset of the COVID-19 pandemic, Boudin reduced the San Francisco's jail population by 25%, from around 1100 to 840, following outbreaks in other American cities such as New York City. Older inmates or those with medical conditions were prioritized, while those almost done with their sentences or were charged with misdemeanors were considered for home detention or probation. This was increased to approximately 40% in April 2020.

==== Police accountability policies ====
In June 2020, during the George Floyd protests that demanded more police accountability, Boudin and other prosecutors across the country implemented new policies to address police accountability.

On June 1, 2020, a group of active and retired district attorneys in California—including Boudin, Diana Becton, and George Gascón—called on the State Bar of California to prohibit elected prosecutors from accepting campaign contributions from police unions. They cited potential conflicts of interest between the police's financial backing and the prosecutors who potentially have to file charges against them. Robert Stern, a former attorney who worked for the California Fair Political Practices Commission, doubted that the ban would have any major effects as most unions donate through political action committees, which are not subject to contribution limits, and cited potential First Amendment concerns. The request also faced backlash from police unions in Los Angeles and San Francisco, who called the effort politically opportunistic.

On June 2, 2020, Boudin and Supervisor Shamann Walton announced a resolution prohibiting the hiring of law enforcement officers with prior findings of misconduct or those who quit while under active investigation for misconduct.

Also in June 2020, Boudin announced a new policy requiring prosecutors to review all available evidence before charging any cases involving allegations of resisting or obstructing police officers or committing an assault on officers. He introduced a new policy wherein cases would not be charged or prosecuted based on the sole evidence of officers with a history of misconduct, such as excessive force or discrimination, without prior approval of the district attorney. He also announced that victims of police violence would be able to file for medical compensation regardless if the officer was prosecuted for assault or found to have used excessive force. Boudin stated that the policy is meant to supplement a gap in the state's compensation laws, which excluded victims of police assaults and shootings if police reports suggest that the victim contributed to their own injury or death. Compensation would be processed via a partnership between the district attorney's office and the University of California, San Francisco's Trauma Recovery Center. A budget was not determined at the time of announcement.

Boudin filed charges against Officer Terrance Stangel for striking Dacari Spiers with a baton in what he called the "first-ever use-of-force case against an on-duty officer for excessive force". Stangel alleged that Boudin's office withheld a witness interview which said that Spiers was assaulting his girlfriend, therefore justifying the use of force. An investigator with the office also testified that she felt pressured to not disclose evidence, although Judge Jacqueline Scott Corley later ruled that the evidence would not have affected the case. Corley also fined the city for failing to disclose three interviews with officers by the police department. A jury later acquitted Stangel of all charges.

==== Criticism ====
Boudin has received criticism for the increase in specific crimes, particularly burglaries, car theft, and murders, during his tenure. According to The Atlantic, however, there was a decline in reported rates of general violent crime, including rapes and assaults. According to The Intercept, the overall number of reported crimes declined. Official police data showed an increase in crime through 2020 and 2022, the years when Boudin was in office, compared to prior and subsequent years despite decreased population and foot traffic during the pandemic. Crime statistics largely demonstrated a decrease in violent crimes and property crimes in the immediate years after Boudin's recall.

In a poll from May 2022, 53% of San Franciscans strongly disapproved of Boudin's job performance, 18% somewhat disapproved, 22% somewhat approved and 8% strongly approved.

In December 2020, SFPD data showed a rise of about 46% in burglaries compared to the previous year, which San Francisco Police Chief William Scott attributed to the March 2020 shelter-in-place orders in San Francisco and "prolific" serial burglars who were released from custody. According to a spokesperson for Boudin, prosecutors had filed charges in about 66% of the cases and filed motions to revoke probation in about 82% of cases. Boudin theorized that the rise of burglaries in neighborhoods such as Bernal Heights was due to "economic desperation" from the COVID-19 pandemic and the shift of targeting from tourists to residents and small businesses.

In October 2020, Boudin's office sent out a survey to 10,500 crime victims, asking them to rank their experience with his office. The survey offered raffle prizes for participation. Responses to the survey were mixed, and some respondents, including sexual assault survivors whose cases were dismissed by Boudin's office, found the questions to be insensitive. In response, Rachel Marshall, a spokeswoman for Boudin's office, issued a statement citing a statistic indicating that the office has prosecuted 35 of 61 (57%) sexual assault cases requested for prosecution by police. Marshall called that a high percentage and said that proving sexual assault in court is difficult.

Boudin was criticized for his handling of the case of Deshaune Lumpkin, a 17-year old who shot and killed a 6 year old. Boudin decided to try Lumpkin as a minor and consequently received only 7 years in prison, a decision that was criticized by the media and the family of the victim.

When asked about the January 2021 killing of Vicha Ratanapakdee, Boudin called the crime "heinous" but did not think that the attack was racially motivated, stating that "the defendant was in some sort of a temper tantrum." The family of Ratanapakdee expressed outrage over the characterization of the attack as a "temper tantrum", finding the comments to be disheartening and inappropriate for the severity of the crime. Boudin later clarified his comments, stating that he was referring to the perpetrator's conduct before the crime. According to ABC7, the family said that Boudin had planned to participate in a vigil for Ratanapakdee, but did not show up after the family told him they were not interested in taking pictures or videos with him. Boudin has charged Ratanapakdee’s assailant with murder and elder abuse.

Boudin was criticized for his handling of the case of the attack perpetrated by 24-year-old Eric Ramos-Hernandez on 84-year old Rong Xin Liao. After spending time in jail, Ramos-Hernandez was released on mental health diversion. Boudin's office claimed that outcome was desired by Liao, who speaks only Cantonese. Liao's family disputed this claim, and instead stated that Liao desired "strict punishment". The family, together with groups such as Asians Are Strong, United Peace Collaborative, Stop AAPI Hate, and career prosecutor Nancy Tung protested Boudin's action and organized a demonstration outside the Hall of Justice.

Boudin has been criticized for his alleged lack of prosecution of drug-related crimes, with only three drug convictions in 2021, none of which were for fentanyl dealing. Boudin has defended his actions saying that many of the drug dealers in the Bay Area are from Honduras, and would face deportation if convicted of drug dealing.

Samantha Michaels in Mother Jones claimed that "crime rates are not spiraling out of control, and there’s no evidence that Boudin or other DAs are responsible for the upticks that have occurred. In fact, academics who studied progressive prosecutors around the country found that their policies did not cause violence to rise". She cites one study that looked at violent crime rates in Brooklyn, Chicago, St. Louis, and Philadelphia from 2014 to 2018 and another that looked at recidivism rates of defendants who had their misdemeanors dismissed. Michaels also noted that murder rates had risen nationally during the pandemic, and while there was a 36 percent spike in San Francisco homicides in 2021, many other areas saw a greater rise.

At an open court hearing in September 2021, San Francisco County Superior Court Judge Bruce Chan criticized Boudin's management of the district attorney's office as disorganized, inadvertent, and marred by constant turnover and managerial reorganization. He also criticized the office for putting the politics of criminal justice reform above "the fundamentals of competent, professional prosecution." The case of a judge publicly criticizing a DA was characterized as unusual by the media. A spokesperson for the District Attorney's office later said that Chan apologized in private. The fact happened following a case of a defendant charged with felony gun possession and driving with a suspended or revoked license, which the prosecution asked Chan to dismiss after the DA had failed to disclose DNA evidence for over a year. The public defender, Martina Avalos, further rebuked Boudin’s office for routinely failing to turn over exculpatory evidence in a reasonable amount of time, resulting in Brady disclosure violations. Boudin's office acknowledged having failed to disclose evidence on time, but disputed having hid it intentionally.

By October 2021, at least 51--or about one-third--of lawyers at the District Attorney's Office had resigned or been fired since Boudin took over in January 2020. The high turnover rate has been criticized as unusual and producing understaffing.

==== Release of repeat offenders ====
Boudin has been criticized in a number of instances for releasing suspects with a history of previous convictions who then went on to commit further crimes.

Troy Ramon McAlister, a repeat offender who had three federal felony convictions before 2015, was released on parole from state prison on April 10, 2020, under a plea appeal with Boudin's office and was arrested by police in November and December 2020 for vehicle and drug crimes. Boudin's office declined to file new charges against McAlister, stating that the state's parole officials had more leverage to keep individuals in custody for nonviolent crimes. On December 31, 2020, McAlister struck and killed pedestrians Hanako Abe and Elizabeth Platt while driving a stolen vehicle. While Boudin noted that the parole officers did not hold McAlister after his arrest on December 20, 2020, the California Department of Corrections and Rehabilitation and district attorneys from Sacramento and Alameda have criticized Boudin's office for the lack of prosecutions against McAlister and other "alleged serial offenders". Following the arrest, Jason Calacanis began raising money to hire an independent investigative journalist to cover the district attorney's office to hold him "accountable to the people of San Francisco".

In February 2021, Jerry Lyons ran a red light in a stolen Ford Explorer and slammed into a group of cars, killing pedestrian Sheria Musyoka near Lake Merced. Lyons had an arrest record dating back more than a decade and was on probation in both San Francisco and San Mateo County at the time, having been arrested several times in 2020 for driving a stolen car while intoxicated. After his December 2020 arrest, Boudin requested a blood toxicology report before pressing charges. Lyons was detained for 27 days for violating his probation in connection with a previous grand theft conviction and later released on community supervision. In January 2021, he was requested to report back to the police after the report confirmed his inebriation. The death of Musyoka led to a petition by former San Francisco mayoral candidate Richie Greenberg, demanding Boudin resign immediately. The petition gathered 10,000 signatures in four days. The SFPOA has criticized Boudin for releasing Lyons and for being too lenient on repeat offenders. Conversely, District Attorney Steve Wagstaffe of San Mateo County, who has charged Lyons for unrelated misdemeanors, did not see a viable alternative and opined that, "Lyons most likely would not have been in custody anyway because of the pandemic and legal requirements."

=== 2022 recall election ===
By May 2021, Boudin had become the target of two recall campaigns, with social media pages calling for his recall appearing as early as December 2020. Efforts increased after the New Year's Eve vehicular manslaughter of two pedestrians by a repeat offender, who was subsequently released on bail. In the incident, Troy McAlister, who was on parole for robbery, hit and killed Elizabeth Platt and Hanako Abe with a stolen vehicle. McAlister had been repeatedly arrested and released multiple times in the previous few years. On March 9, 2021, the San Francisco Department of Elections cleared the campaign led by former mayoral candidate Richie Greenberg, which would require the organizers to collect 51,325 signatures—roughly 10% of the registered voters in San Francisco—by August 2021 to trigger a recall vote. Boudin responded to the recall effort with a statement saying, "I am not surprised that the same people who opposed my election, and the reforms that came with it, are now trying to undo the will of the voters here through a Republican-led recall effort." The first campaign collected over 50,000 signatures but fell 1,714 short of the required number.

In late 2021, prosecutors Brooke Jenkins and Don du Bain left the DA’s office and publicly joined the effort to recall him, blaming Boudin’s lack of commitment to prosecuting crimes. Jenkins criticized Boudin by saying that " The D.A.’s office now is a sinking ship. It’s like the Titanic, and it’s taking public safety along with it." She claims that, while describing herself as a progressive prosecutor and agreeing with the necessity of criminal justice reform, she believes that Boudin's prioritization of ideology caused disorganization, lack of morale in the DA office, and hurt victims and families.

A second campaign, The Safer SF Without Boudin pro-recall campaign, raised 83,487 signatures, a sufficient number to trigger a recall election. The campaign was led by former San Francisco Democratic Party County Central Committee chair Mary Jung, but Boudin and his supporters alleged, based on the campaign's sources of funding, that the campaign was largely a Republican effort to remove him from power. Despite Boudin's claims, the recall campaign was publicly led by Democrats. 83% of donors to the campaign were from Democratic-registered voters or no-party-preference voters, with over 80% of donations coming from local San Franciscans. A February 2022 poll commissioned by the recall campaign indicated that two-thirds of Democrats were in favor of the recall. In the run-up to the recall, Scott Shafer for KQED radio suggested both Boudin's policies and his personality may have played a role in motivating voters.

The recall election was held on June 7, 2022. On that date, Boudin was successfully recalled, as 55% of voters supported his removal.

In response to the successful recall, Boudin admitted he had made mistakes during his tenure and blamed his defeat on a combination of angry and frustrated voters as well as significant spending by "right-wing billionaires" in favor of recall.

== Career after the District Attorney's office ==
In June 2023, Boudin joined the faculty of the University of California, Berkeley, School of Law as the founding executive director of the Criminal Law & Justice Center.

== Personal life ==
As of 2019, Boudin was living in the Outer Sunset neighborhood of San Francisco with his wife, Valerie Block, a post-doctoral researcher at University of California, San Francisco. They had a child together in September 2021.

In November 2020, Boudin lobbied New York Governor Andrew Cuomo to commute the 75-year-to-life prison sentence of his father David Gilbert, the last member of Weather Underground still incarcerated for their involvement in the 1981 Brink's robbery and three related murders. His mother Kathy Boudin had spent 22 years in prison for her role in the 1981 Brink's robbery and the related murders before she was released in 2003. The effort to release his father was led by CUNY School of Law professor Steve Zeidman and supported by 45 faith leaders including Ela Gandhi, Bernice King, and Archbishop Desmond Tutu. They cited Gilbert's clean prison record and increased COVID-19 risk in prison as arguments for his clemency. Relatives of the murder victims contested the appeal, questioning why Gilbert deserved attention when inmates with lesser convictions did not. On August 24, his final night as governor of New York due to his resignation, Cuomo commuted Gilbert's sentence, making him eligible to apply for parole. He was granted parole on October 26, 2021 and released on November 4, 2021.

== Publications ==
=== Books ===
- "Chapter 1: Letters to Our Parents," In: Berger, Dan; Boudin, Chesa; Farrow, Kenyon (eds.). Letters from Young Activists. Today's Rebels Speak Out. Nation Books, 2005, pp. 3–8. ISBN 978-1-56025-747-9.
- The Venezuelan Revolution: 100 Questions–100 Answers. Chesa Boudin (ed.), Gabriel González (ed.), Wilmer Rumbos (ed.). Basic Books, 2006. ISBN 978-1-5602-5773-8
- Gringo. A Coming-of-Age in Latin America. Chesa Boudin; paperback ed. Scribner, 2009. ISBN 978-1-4165-5912-2

=== Articles ===
- "Children Left Behind." Chesa Boudin, The Nation (2003)
- "Steps to Family Forgiveness." Chesa Boudin. Fellowship 70 (2004): 18.
- "Strategic Options for Development of a Worker Center." Chesa Boudin and Rebecca Scholtz. Harvard Latino Law Review 13 (2010): 91–126.
- "Institutional Design and International Electoral Observers: Kicking the Habit." Northwestern Interdisciplinary Law Review 39 (2010): 39.
- "Publius and the Petition: Doe v. Reed and the History of Anonymous Speech." Chesa Boudin. Yale Law Journal 120 (2011): 2140–2181.
- "Children of Incarcerated Parents: The Child's Constitutional Right to the Family Relationship." Chesa Boudin. The Journal of Criminal Law and Criminology 101 (2011): 77–118.
- "Prison visitation policies: A fifty-state survey." Chesa Boudin, Trevor Stutz, Aaron Littman. Yale Law & Policy Review 32 (2013): 149–189.
- "The impact of overbooking on a pre-trial risk assessment tool." Kristian Lum, Chesa Boudin, Megan Price (2020).
- "The Opportunity in Crisis: How 2020's Challenges Present New Opportunities for Prosecutors." Chesa Boudin. The Journal of Criminal Law & Criminology 110 (2020)
- "Prosecutors, Power, and Justice: Building an Anti-Racist Prosecutorial System." Chesa Boudin (March 25, 2021). Rutgers Law Review, 73(5) (2021)
- "San Francisco leaders turn to U.S. Supreme Court instead of facing their failures on homelessness." Chesa Boudin. The San Francisco Standard (2024)
- "Criminal Justice Reform Is Health Care Reform." Lawrence A. Haber, Chesa Boudin, Brie A. Williams. Journal of the American Medical Association 331(1) (2024): 21-22. doi:10.1001/jama.2023.25005
- Boudin, Chesa; Fish, Eris S. (April 29, 2025). "Towards Pretrial Criminal Adjudication". Boston College Law Review. 66 (4): 1135–1228. doi:10.70167/LVDG4087. ISSN 1930-661X.

Legal offices
| Preceded by Suzy Loftus; Interim | District Attorney of San Francisco; January 8, 2020 – July 8, 2022 | Succeeded by Brooke Jenkins; Interim |
