= Mark Farrell (politician) =

American politician from California

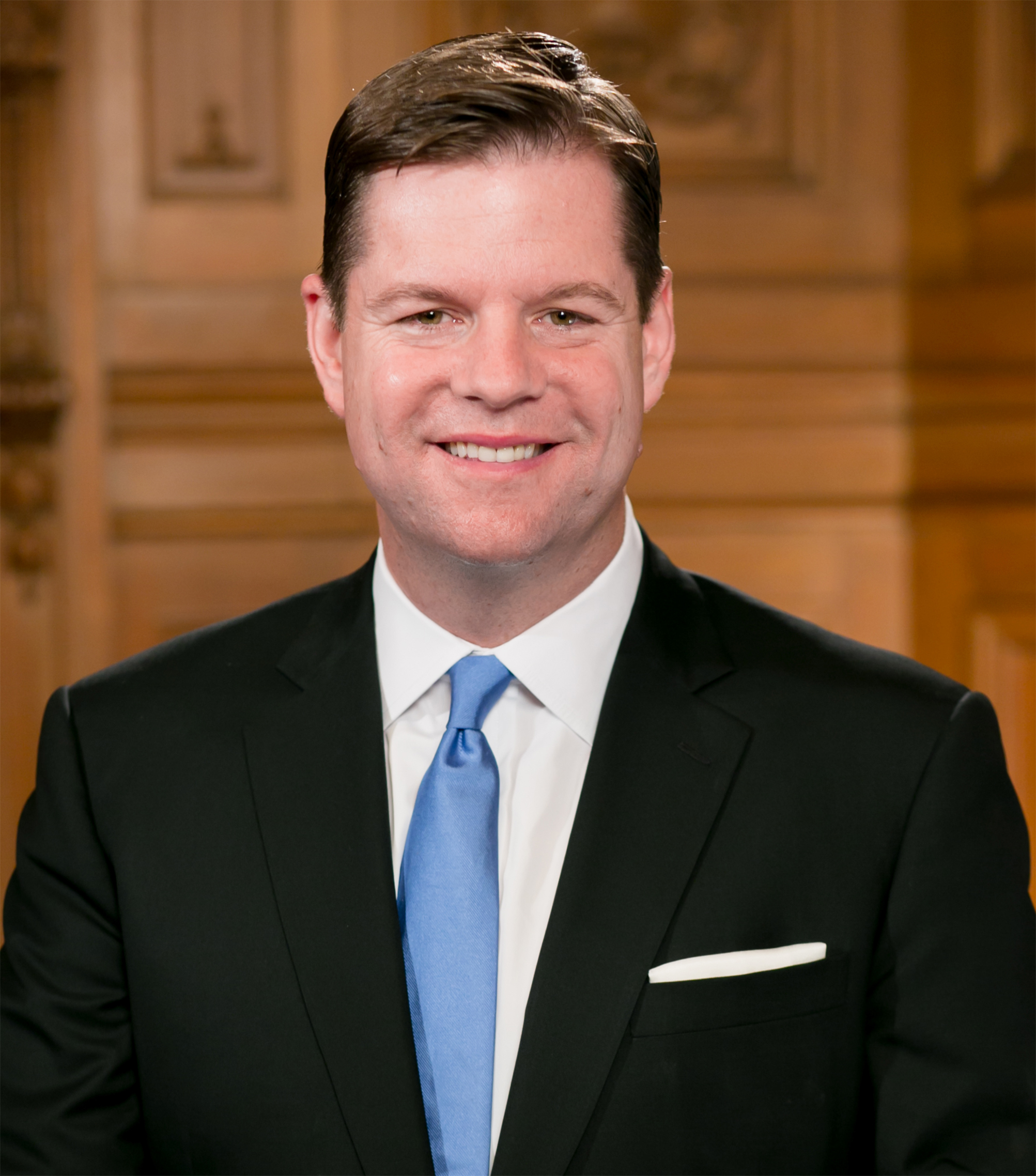
- Official portrait, 2015

44th Mayor of San Francisco
- In office January 23, 2018 – July 11, 2018
- Preceded by: London Breed (Acting)
- Succeeded by: London Breed

Member of the San Francisco Board of Supervisors from the 2nd district
- In office January 8, 2011 – January 23, 2018
- Preceded by: Michela Alioto-Pier
- Succeeded by: Catherine Stefani

Personal details
- Born: Mark Ewoldt Farrell; March 15, 1974 (age 52) San Francisco, California, U.S.
- Party: Democratic
- Spouse: Liz Farrell
- Children: 3
- Education: Loyola Marymount University (BA); University College Dublin (MA); University of Pennsylvania (JD)
- Website: Campaign website

Mark Ewoldt Farrell (born March 15, 1974) is an American politician and lawyer who served as the 44th Mayor of San Francisco from January 23 to July 11, 2018. Before his appointment as mayor, he served on the Board of Supervisors for nearly two terms, representing District 2 (the Marina, Cow Hollow, Pacific Heights, Seacliff, Lake District, Presidio Heights, Jordan Park, Laurel Heights, Presidio, and part of Russian Hill).

Farrell ran as a candidate in the 2024 San Francisco mayoral election, where he placed fourth behind incumbent mayor London Breed, challenger Aaron Peskin, and winner Daniel Lurie.

== Early life and education ==
Mark Ewoldt Farrell was born in 1974, the only child of Lena (née Ewoldt), a former flight attendant from Probstei, Germany near Kiel and John Farrell, a former Air Force pilot, and attorney, who grew up near the Palace of Fine Arts on Broderick Street in the Marina District. Farrell spent his summers at his cousin's family farm in Probstei.

Farrell attended both Stuart Hall for Boys and Saint Ignatius College Preparatory, and subsequently received a B.A. in 1996 from Loyola Marymount University in Los Angeles, an M.A. from University College Dublin in Ireland, and a J.D. in 2001 from the University of Pennsylvania Law School in Philadelphia.

== Private sector career ==
Farrell practiced law as a corporate and securities attorney at Wilson Sonsini Goodrich & Rosati in Silicon Valley, then joined Thomas Weisel Partners as an investment banker. He subsequently co-founded Quest Hospitality Ventures, a San Francisco-based venture capital firm focused on the hospitality and travel sector. Prior to his election to office, he served as a mid-level director of Quest Hospitality Ventures, now Thayer Ventures a venture capital firm.

== Board of Supervisors (2010–2018) ==
Farrell was elected in November 2010 to the 2nd district seat on the San Francisco Board of Supervisors. He was subsequently re-elected in November 2014. On the board, Farrell served as chair of the Budget and Finance Committee, a founding member of the 2016–17 Super Bowl Bid Committee, and on eight other local and state boards and committees.

Farrell is regarded to be a political moderate.

After his election to the Board of Supervisors, Farrell ushered through a two-year city budget that reformed the way San Francisco paid for retiree health care benefits and passed small business tax credit legislation so the city's small businesses could hire more employees and create more local jobs. In addition, Farrell created a public-private partnership between the San Francisco non-profit Kiva.org and San Francisco's Office of Small Business. He also became the first elected official in California to endorse Kiva borrowers on the platform personally.

Farrell was an advocate for the passage of Laura's Law, which established a program to compel mentally ill people to seek treatment, both voluntarily and through court-mandate. The legislation was a matter of heavy debate, and was ultimately passed by the Board of Supervisors in 2014 and took effect in 2015. In 2018, Heather Knight of the San Francisco Chronicle described data collected on the first two years the program as demonstrating success.

Farrell introduced an ordinance in 2015 that required gun store owners to video record all transactions and give weekly updates on ammunition sales to the police department. High Bridge Arms, the only firearm retailer in the city, closed after the ordinance was passed. Farrell told the San Francisco Chronicle, "From my perspective, if the last gun store in San Francisco wants to close its doors because of my legislation, so be it."

=== 2014 Campaign Finance Ethics Violations ===
In June 2016, Farrell was ordered to repay $191,000 in unlawful campaign funding after the City ethics panel voted, 5–0, to uphold the original 2014 decision of the San Francisco Ethics Commission that he should have to forfeit back to the city the amount raised from just two donors and used late in the 2010 election by Common Sense Voters, an independent expenditure committee, with improper communications from a campaign consultant. Farrell was exonerated by the California Fair Political Practices Commission, although the campaign consultant Chris Lee and Common Sense Voters were found to be in violation of federal campaign finance laws, but a further complaint was filed with the City commission by Janet Reilly, who lost to Farrell by 256 votes. City law, stricter than state law, holds candidates personally responsible for staff as well as themselves, whether they knew about the illegal communication or not. In an unusual move, Farrell responded with a lawsuit against the City in May to prevent further collection efforts from the Treasurer's office, and settled with the city for $25,000 in October 2016.

== Mayoralty (2018) ==
=== Appointment ===
Farrell was appointed as mayor by the Board of Supervisors on January 23, 2018, succeeding acting mayor London Breed, who had assumed the position after Mayor Lee's death on December 12, 2017, by virtue of her office as president of the Board of Supervisors. Breed launched a campaign in the special election to fill the office permanently.

Three weeks after Lee's death, the San Francisco Board of Supervisors voted to remove Breed and appoint Mark Farrell as acting mayor. This vote was contentious. Those supporting Breed's removal argued that it presented a conflict of interest for her to continue to serve as a member of the Board of Supervisors while also acting as mayor, and that it would present an unfair advantage for her to enter the special mayoral election with pseudo-incumbency. Opponents of her removal alleged that there were racist and sexist motivations for removing Breed, who is a black woman.

After the vote, the mayoral oath of office was administered to Farrell by City Attorney Dennis Herrera. In order to accept his appointment as mayor, Farrell resigned his seat on the Board of Supervisors. On January 30, Farrell appointed Catherine Stefani to his former seat on the Board of Supervisors.

Farrell did not seek election in special election held on June 5, 2018, for a new mayor to fill the remainder of Lee's unexpired term. Breed won that election, and was sworn in on July 11, marking the end of Farrell's mayoralty. and served out the remainder of Lee's uncompleted term into January 8, 2020.

To assuage conflict of interest criticisms, Farrell took a leave of absence from Thayer Ventures during his time as mayor.

=== Tenure ===
Shortly after entering office, Farrell signed legislation banning the sale of fur products in San Francisco, citing concerns about animal cruelty. At the time, San Francisco was the largest city in the United States to ban fur sales.

Farrell authored an $11 billion city budget. The budget included funding for the hiring of 250 new police officers. It also allocated in excess of $7 million to criminal justice reform measures, including a pilot program for pretrial diversion. It also increased the amount of funding the city provided to supportive homeless services, including homeless navigation centers, and the Homeward Bound to send homeless people to live with loved ones elsewhere.

Farrell signed into law an ordinance which prohibited court fines and fees from being exclusively levied on those who had previously been incarcerated. San Francisco was the first city in the nation to pass such an ordinance.

=== Behested payments investigation ===
As supervisor and mayor, Farrell acted as an intermediary for $882,500 in "behested payments"—donations from private entities that he passed along to the San Francisco Parks Alliance. This nonprofit was later implicated in the City Hall corruption scandal involving former Public Works director Mohammed Nuru. Farrell also helped facilitate $35,000 in behested payments to the Parks Alliance on behalf of Recology, the trash collection company later involved in bribing Nuru An Ethics Commission report from 2020 noted that some of the behested payments Farrell made were timed closely to lobbyist contacts he had with companies like AT&T, Facebook and the San Francisco Realtors Association. In one case, Farrell introduced legislation that would have benefited AT&T after facilitating behested payments from the company.

== Post-mayoralty ==
After leaving office, Farrell returned to his position at Thayer Ventures.

=== 2024 San Francisco mayoral campaign ===
In February 2024, Farrell launched a campaign for mayor, seeking to unseat Breed. Farrell was regarded as the most conservative of the candidates in the election. Heather Knight of The New York Times, in February 2024, called Farrell the "most rightward leaning" of the challengers that had entered the mayoral race against Breed. Dustin Gardiner and Lara Korte of Politico described Farrell as running on a platform of "centrist and business-friendly proposals," calling his platform, "strikingly conservative for San Francisco — the liberal bastion that has shaped the direction of the national Democratic Party for decades." Having good name recognition, Farrell was regarded to be a major candidate in the election.

Farrell pledged a "zero-tolerance approach and policy for all crime in San Francisco," promising to fire Bill Scott from his post as the city's police chief. He also promised that he would increase the number of recruits in the city's police academy and "massively" increase the size of the city's police force. He pledged to mandate having anyone that is administered Narcan by city employees detained and then directed into drug rehabilitation programs. He pledged to eliminate recent budget increase for community health and welfare programs and instead allocate that money for public safety and the hiring of additional police officers. He characterized the community health and welfare programs as "hav[ing] nothing to show" for the funding that the city has allocated to them.

Farrell proposed creating an exemption from local taxes for small businesses whose gross revenues are smaller than $5 million. He also called for re-introducing cars to Market Street, which currently serves as a pedestrian-only corridor in downtown San Francisco.

On expanding housing supply in San Francisco, Farrell said during his campaign, "I do not believe that we need to upzone every single neighborhood in San Francisco." His position to focus dense housing in an already-dense neighborhoods was criticized by pro-housing advocates.

Farrell pledged to remove all large tent homeless encampments in the city within his first year. He described his homeless plan as a move from a “housing-first” to a “shelter-first” approach which would focus on establishing temporary beds rather than providing permanent housing to the homeless. He stated that he does not believe the city has the resources to find permanent housing for all its citizens. He also proposed establishing a central intake location that would be open at all hours to guide homeless into shelters.

In November 2024, Farrell consented to pay an ethics penalty of $108,179. Farrell violated the city's $500 cap on individual campaign contributions by inappropriately channeling roughly $93,000 from a political action committee (PAC) he set up to support Proposition D into his mayoral campaign, according to the San Francisco Ethics Commission. Farrell accepted full responsibility for the mistakes and said that the problems were caused by an "accounting error" and a dispute over staff time allocation. Investigators did note, however, that Farrell's contacts pointed to a more intentional blending of campaign finances. The penalty was the largest ever imposed by the ethics commission.

Farrell lost the election, coming in fourth behind the winner Daniel Lurie, incumbent Mayor London Breed, and Board of Supervisors President Aaron Peskin.

== Personal life ==
Farrell's wife, Liz, was raised in Danville. She was formerly a morning TV news producer. The couple have three children.

Political offices
Preceded by Michela Alioto-Pier	Member of the San Francisco Board of Supervisors from the 2nd district 2011–2018	Succeeded by Catherine Stefani
Preceded by London Breed (Acting)	Mayor of San Francisco; 2018	Succeeded by London Breed
