= Corruption in the United States =

Corruption in the United States has been a perennial political issue, peaking in the Jacksonian era and the Gilded Age before declining with the reforms of the Progressive Era.

As of February 2026, the United States scores 64 on a scale from 0 ("highly corrupt") to 100 ("very clean") according to Transparency International's 2025 Corruption Perceptions Index. When ranked by score, the United States ranks 29th among the 182 countries in the index, where the country ranked first is perceived to have the most honest public sector.

== History ==
=== 18th century ===
Corruption in the United States dates back to the founding of the country. The American Revolution was, in part, a response to the perceived corruption of the British monarchy. Separation of powers was developed to enable accountability. Freedom of association also served this end, allowing citizens to organize independently of the government. This was in contrast to some European powers at the time, where all associations and economic activities were implicitly managed by the government.

During the 1st United States Congress, Secretary of the Treasury Alexander Hamilton proposed several new economic initiatives that involved taxes, tariffs, debts, and a national bank. Fears that these proposals would lead to corruption grew so great that the Democratic-Republican Party was formed to oppose them.

=== 19th century ===
Corruption reemerged as a major theme in American politics in the 1824 United States presidential election, where Andrew Jackson ran as an anti-corruption candidate. The issue was only exacerbated by the controversial results of the election, preventing Jackson's victory, known as the corrupt bargain. Following Jackson's victory in the next election, a dispute over the national bank again became relevant in the issue of corruption.

In state governments, authorities would authorize corporate charters to authorize the creation of new corporations. These faced some resistance due to their potential for corruption. While they were generally used in ways that promoted the economic development of the states, there were instances of charters being given preferential treatment to political allies. The Albany Regency, for example, authorized charters for banks in exchange for political and financial support. This issue was eventually solved as state governments standardized the process of incorporation throughout the 1840s.

The Gilded Age was a period of increased prosperity and growth in the United States. This growth resulted in a corresponding increase in corruption and bribery in the government and in business. The main issue of contention was the spoils system, in which government jobs were given in exchange for political support. This issue was addressed by civil service reform.

The presidency of Ulysses S. Grant during the Gilded Age was mired with instances of corruption. Grant had been elected without political experience, and he had little ability to control or regulate the members of his government, who proceeded to take advantage of his inexperience. Notable examples include the Whiskey Ring, the Star Route scandal, and the trader post scandal. The Crédit Mobilier scandal also became public information at this time.

In addition, political machines such as Tammany Hall, and their leaders such as Boss Tweed were found to be smuggling millions of public dollars from taxpayers into the pockets of Tammany fellows. They also gave jobs out to those who supported Tammany as opposed to those who had merit, and habitually double-registered people to vote in elections by giving them different haircuts. Southern political machines used violence, bribery, and other means to commit election fraud against challengers such as the Populist Party and maintain Democratic Party dominance.

One researcher contends that in the late 19th and early 20th centuries, corruption in the wealthy, industrialized United States in some ways resembled corruption in impoverished developing nations today. Political machines manipulated voters to place candidates in power loyal to the machines. Public offices were sold for money or political support. Private interests bribed government officials in exchange for special treatment. However, unlike many developing countries today, the United States had a free press, an honest federal judiciary, and citizen activists who led the reaction against corruption in the early 20th century. The United States also did not have to struggle against widespread poverty in addition to corruption, and the executive branch of the federal government never descended to the levels of kleptocracy seen in some developing countries today.

=== 20th century ===
The Progressive Era was a period of anti-corruption fervor in the United States led by the progressive movement. During this time, political machines and monopolies were targeted and disestablished. Theodore Roosevelt was a major figure in the Progressive Era, leading the efforts of trustbusting.

The Teapot Dome scandal was a major instance of corruption during the Presidency of Warren G. Harding. Secretary of the Interior Albert B. Fall had accepted bribes from oil companies in exchange for access to government petroleum reserves. After the corruption was discovered, Fall was sentenced to prison.

Richard Nixon was notably the subject of multiple corruption allegations. While running for Vice President in 1952, Nixon famously gave a speech declaring that he accepted one gift, a dog named Checkers, and that he had no intention of returning it. During Nixon's presidency, he was implicated in the Watergate scandal. Shortly before, his Vice President Spiro Agnew had been found guilty of tax fraud.

In the 1970s, the FBI conducted a sting operation codenamed Abscam to uncover corruption in Congress. Seven members of Congress were convicted of bribery. In the 1980s, the Oklahoma county commissioners scandal resulted in the conviction of 230 people, the most people ever convicted in a public corruption case in the US.

== Contemporary corruption ==
In Transparency International's Corruption Perceptions Index, the United States' perceived resistance to corruption declined from its highest score of 76 in 2015 to 64 in 2025 (with 0 being "highly corrupt" and 100 "very clean"). The 2025 score, announced in early 2026, was the lowest the US has ever been assigned since the current system of scoring began in 2012. For comparison with regional scores, the best score among the countries of the Americas (Note: Argentina, Bahamas, Barbados, Belize, Bolivia, Brazil, Canada, Chile, Colombia, Costa Rica, Cuba, Dominica, Dominican Republic, Ecuador, El Salvador, Grenada, Guatemala, Guyana, Haiti, Honduras, Jamaica, Mexico, Nicaragua, Panama, Paraguay, Peru, Saint Lucia, Saint Vincent and the Grenadines, Suriname, Trinidad and Tobago, United States of America, Uruguay, Venezuela) was 75, the average score was 42, and the worst score was 10. For comparison with worldwide scores, the best score on the 2025 Corruption Perceptions Index was 89 (ranked 1), the average score was 42, and the worst score was 9 (ranked 181, in a two-way tie).

In 2019, Transparency International had stated that the United States is "experiencing threats to its system of checks and balances", along with an "erosion of ethical norms at the highest levels of power", citing populism, nativism, and political polarization as factors that may increase corruption. In 2024, Transparency International spoke approvingly of how the federal and state courts have withstood attacks on their independence, although it found the weak ethics rules for the Supreme Court worrisome.

At the beginning of the 21st century, the US was generally regarded as having low levels of corruption index and was viewed as having high levels of political stability. The FBI is responsible for investigating corruption in the United States with several initiatives to investigate both domestic and foreign corruption, and it recognizes public corruption as its "top criminal investigative priority".

In 2019, Stephen Walt argued that the United States was becoming increasingly corrupt, pointing to the Trump administration, the causes of the Great Recession, the failure of the Boeing 737 MAX, and the 2019 college admissions bribery scandal as examples. Walt argues that these examples show that corruption is a growing problem in the United States and, in the longer term, threatens the country's soft power. The United States has been cited as a tax haven. The Foreign Account Tax Compliance Act requires foreign governments to reveal American accounts abroad, but the US has no responsibility, legal or otherwise, to share information on non-Americans opening up accounts in the US. In 2016, one estimate placed the total offshore wealth in the US at $800 billion.

=== Supreme Court ===
Ethical controversies among Supreme Court justices have increased in the 21st century, accompanying a decline in the Court's approval rating to historic lows. Accusations arose after a ProPublica report in 2023 claimed that Justice Clarence Thomas had accepted gifts from real-estate investor and Republican donor Harlan Crow without disclosure. These gifts included luxury trips over the course of two decades making use of Crow's private jet, superyacht, and private resorts, as well as tuition payments for the private schooling of Thomas's grandnephew. Crow has served on the board of trustees of institutions that have filed amicus briefs before the court, and his real-estate firm Crow Holdings had ties to four cases before the Supreme Court from which Thomas had not recused himself from, adding to the scandal. The court adopted its first code of conduct on November 13, 2023, however this code of conduct has no means of enforcement and is comparatively weaker than the code to which lower federal judges are held.

=== Donald Trump ===
Donald Trump is often described by historians as corrupt, with numerous scandals during his presidency, including the Trump–Ukraine scandal which resulted in the first impeachment of Donald Trump. After losing the 2020 United States presidential election, Trump claimed, without evidence, voter fraud and used his position in the government in an attempt to overturn the election, culminating in the January 6 United States Capitol attack which failed to overturn the election. The Supreme Court dismissed lawsuits against Trump when he left office, choosing not to rule on whether he violated laws around corruption or self-dealing.

The New York Times found significantly more conflicts of interest at the beginning of Trump's second term than his first. Trump's behavior during his second term, has been labeled as cronyism and creating a culture of corruption in his administration. Trump did not sign the customary ethics pledge and fired many of the officials who monitor ethics and has generally alarmed government watchdogs. The introduction of digital assets and stocks can facilitate far more conflicts and at least the appearance of corruption, than hotel stays and rounds of golf. The first few months of the administration have generated debate as to whether Trump has facilitated more conflicts of interest and corruption than any other president in American history.

=== Ethics of elected officials ===
A January 2018 report by the Public Citizen non-profit describes dozens of foreign governments, special interest groups, and GOP congressional campaign committees that spent hundreds of thousands of dollars at President Donald Trump's properties during his first year in office. The study said that these groups clearly intended to win over the president by helping his commercial business empire profit while he held the office.

In April 2005, former Pennsylvania senator Rick Santorum introduced the National Weather Service Duties Act of 2005, which aimed to prohibit the National Weather Service from releasing weather data to the public without charge where private-sector entities perform the same function commercially. The Aircraft Owners and Pilots Association was organizing a lobbying effort in opposition to the legislation, but it never passed committee. The motivations for the bill were controversial, as employees of AccuWeather, a commercial weather company based in Pennsylvania, donated $10,500 to Santorum and his PAC. The liberal advocacy group Citizens for Responsibility and Ethics in Washington cited the bill as one of several reasons for listing Santorum as one of its "most corrupt politicians". In support of the bill, Santorum criticized the National Weather Service in September 2005, saying its evacuation warnings for Hurricane Katrina were "insufficient".

James Traficant was one of the first individuals in the federal government to be charged with corruption charges in the 2000s. Traficant was expelled from the House on July 24, 2002, after being convicted of 10 felony counts, including taking bribes, filing false tax returns, racketeering, and forcing his congressional staff to perform chores at his farm in Ohio and houseboat in Washington, D.C. He was sentenced to prison and released on September 2, 2009, after serving a 7-year sentence.

The 2020 congressional insider trading scandal was a political scandal in the United States involving allegations that several members of the United States Senate violated the STOCK Act by selling stock at the start of the COVID-19 pandemic in the United States and just before a stock market crash on February 20, 2020, using knowledge given to them at a closed Senate meeting. The Department of Justice (DOJ) initiated a probe into the stock transactions on March 30, 2020. No charges were brought against anyone and all investigations into the matter are closed.

Congressman George Santos was involved in numerous corruption scandals, including money laundering, wire fraud, and identity theft. He was subsequently expelled from the house and pleaded guilty to all charges.

In September 2023, New Jersey Democratic Senator Bob Menendez was charged with corruption alongside his wife, Nadine. This is the second time that Menendez, who served as chairman of the Senate Foreign Relations Committee, has faced such allegations. Menendez and his wife were reportedly engaged in a bribery scheme with three businessmen from New Jersey whereby they accepted gold, cash, a luxury vehicle, and various other benefits, totaling hundreds of thousands of dollars in exchange for Menendez using his influential position to assist both the businessmen and the government of Egypt, the home country of one of the individuals implicated. He was convicted on all charges and sentenced to 11 years in prison in January 2025.

In May 2024, Henry Cuellar was indicted on charges of accepting almost $600,000 in bribes from Azerbaijan and a Mexican bank.

=== Independent federal agencies ===
While not as sensational as other agencies in the government, cases of corruption have marred the integrity of independent federal agencies, raising concerns about accountability and the misuse of public funds. This is demonstrated in the case of the General Services Administration (GSA) scandal, which came to light in 2012 after an Inspector General report flagged extravagant expenses. It was revealed that in 2010, the agency spent over $820,000 during a four-day Western Regions conference in Las Vegas. This corruption scandal led to the resignation of then GSA Administration chief Martha Johnson and the firing of several officials. There is also the case of mismanagement in the Department of Veteran Affairs in 2014. According to reports, veterans at the Phoenix VA Health Care System and potentially other facilities faced excessive delays when availing medical care. The delays and mismanagement, which were allegedly linked to some deaths, formed part of the staff's manipulation of wait-lists in order to meet performance targets.

In April 2026, the Financial Times reported on a complete collapse in white-collar crime prosecutions under the second Donald Trump administration. The year 2025 had fewer white-collar prosecutions than in any year since at least 1986.

=== By state ===
==== California ====
===== City of Bell =====
The Bell scandal involved the misappropriation of public funds in Bell, California, United States, over a period of several years in the late 2000s. In July 2010, the Los Angeles Times published an investigative article on possible malfeasance in the neighboring city of Maywood, revealing that the city officials of Bell received salaries that were reported as the highest in the nation. Subsequent investigations found atypically high property tax rates, allegations of voter fraud in municipal elections and other irregularities which heightened the ensuing scandal. These and other reports led to widespread criticism and a demand for city officials to resign.

On August 10, 2010, Standard & Poor's lowered Bell's general obligation and pension bond ratings to BB, two notches below investment grade, and placed the ratings on a watchlist for potential further downgrade. S&P credit analyst Michael Taylor said, "We believe that the recent resignation of the city manager and finance director, and reports that the assets purchased with the unrated series 2007 lease-secured debt have decreased in value, have created uncertainty as to the city's future actions."

Eventually, seven Bell city officials, including former mayor Oscar Hernandez, former city administrator Robert Rizzo, assistant city administrator Angela Spaccia, and four city council members were convicted on graft and corruption charges, and were given sentences ranging from probation to twelve years in prison.

Rizzo was sentenced to twelve years' imprisonment for his role in Bell and to 33 months' imprisonment in a separate income tax evasion case. Spaccia was sentenced to eleven years and eight months' imprisonment. Both were also ordered to repay millions of dollars in restitution.

Spaccia was resentenced in October 2017 after an appeals court reversed five counts of misappropriating funds from the city. Judge Ronald S. Coen handed down a new sentence of ten years on the remaining charges of which she was convicted and the amount of money she was ordered to repay in restitution remained the same, which her lawyers planned to appeal, "contending that she was being told to repay money related to crimes which she no longer stands convicted of."

===== San Francisco =====
====== San Francisco Department of Public Works ======
The San Francisco Public Works corruption scandal is an ongoing investigation by federal, state and local prosecutors and investigators into bribery and fraud involving employees and contractors working for San Francisco Public Works (SFPW), and particularly, the Department of Building Inspection (DBI). The investigation was first brought to the public's attention by the arrest in January 2020 of Mohammed Nuru, who was the Director of Public Works, by federal agents. The scandal involved multiple instances of corruption, including conflict of interest, bribery, and fraud within the DBI. The scandal was uncovered through audits, legal proceedings, and investigations by city authorities and federal prosecutors, ultimately leading to the exposure of widespread corruption within the department. As of August 2024, 28 former city employees, officials, contractors and others have been criminally charged.

====== San Francisco Human Rights Commission ======
The Commission became the focus of a corruption scandal in 2024–2025 after a report revealed misuse of public money by its director, Sheryl Davis. Davis oversaw the Dream Keeper Initiative—a program created under former Mayor London Breed to provide grant money to historically marginalized Black communities. An investigation and report by The San Francisco Standard raised concerns that Davis directed funds to projects and nonprofits with personal ties, most notably to Collective Impact, whose executive director, James Spingola, was living with Davis. Davis resigned in September 2024. The city attorney and the San Francisco district attorney launched separate investigations into the alleged fraud and misuse of funds. The city attorney sought to ban Collective Impact from receiving city grants for five years, a move that would cause the nonprofit to close.

====== San Francisco Parks Alliance ======
In 2020, the San Francisco Parks Alliance was linked to a federal corruption probe involving the former head of San Francisco Department of Public Works Mohammed Nuru and the San Francisco-based waste management company, Recology. Nuru used the SFPA as a conduit for what federal prosecutors described as a "slush fund." He controlled an account at the SFPA, and contractors, including Recology, funneled money through this account, often via other nonprofits, to curry favor with Nuru, who had significant influence over city contracts and garbage rates. These funds were then used by Nuru for staff parties, merchandise, and other discretionary expenses that benefited his department and associates. A federal investigation found that from 2014 to 2019, Recology funneled about $900,000 to a Nuru-controlled account at the SFPA in an attempt to influence him. This arrangement contributed to a broader "pay-to-play" culture in San Francisco city government, as described in city controller reports.

==== Illinois ====
Corruption in Illinois has been a problem from the earliest history of the state. Electoral fraud in Illinois pre-dates the territory's admission to the Union in 1818. Illinois had the third most federal criminal convictions for public corruption between 1976 and 2012, behind New York and California. A study published by the University of Illinois Chicago in 2022 ranked Illinois as the second most corrupt state in the nation, with 4 out of the last 11 governors serving time in prison.

===== Chicago =====
Chicago has a long history of political corruption, dating to the incorporation of the city in 1833. It has been a de facto monolithic entity of the Democratic Party from the mid-20th century onward. In the 1980s, the Operation Greylord investigation resulted in the indictments of 93 public officials, including 17 judges. Research released by the University of Illinois at Chicago reports that Chicago and Cook County's judicial district recorded 45 public corruption convictions for 2013, and 1,642 convictions since 1976, when the Department of Justice began compiling statistics. This prompted many media outlets to declare Chicago the "corruption capital of America". Gradel and Simpson's Corrupt Illinois (2015) provides the data behind Chicago's corrupt political culture. They found that a tabulation of federal public corruption convictions make Chicago "undoubtedly the most corrupt city in our nation", with the cost of corruption "at least" $500 million per year.

===== Dixon =====
Rita A. Crundwell is an American woman who served as the comptroller and treasurer of Dixon, Illinois, from 1983 to 2012. She was fired and arrested in April 2012 after the discovery that she had embezzled $53.7 million from the city of Dixon for over 22 years to support her championship American Quarter Horse breeding operation, as well as a lavish lifestyle away from work. Her embezzlement has been described as the largest municipal fraud in U.S. history. Crundwell pleaded guilty to her crimes and was sentenced to 19 years and 7 months in prison.

Crundwell used the money to turn her Quarter Horse breeding operation, RC Quarter Horses, into one of the best-known in the country. Her horses won 52 world championships and she was named the leading owner by the American Quarter Horse Association for eight consecutive years prior to her arrest. She spent 8 1/2 years (43% of her sentence) in prison before being released in mid-2021 to serve the remainder of her sentence in home confinement. Her sentence was commuted along with nearly 1500 other people by President Biden on December 12, 2024. Those commuted were people who had been previously transferred from prison to house arrest under the CARES Act due to having a high risk of COVID-19.

==== Mississippi ====
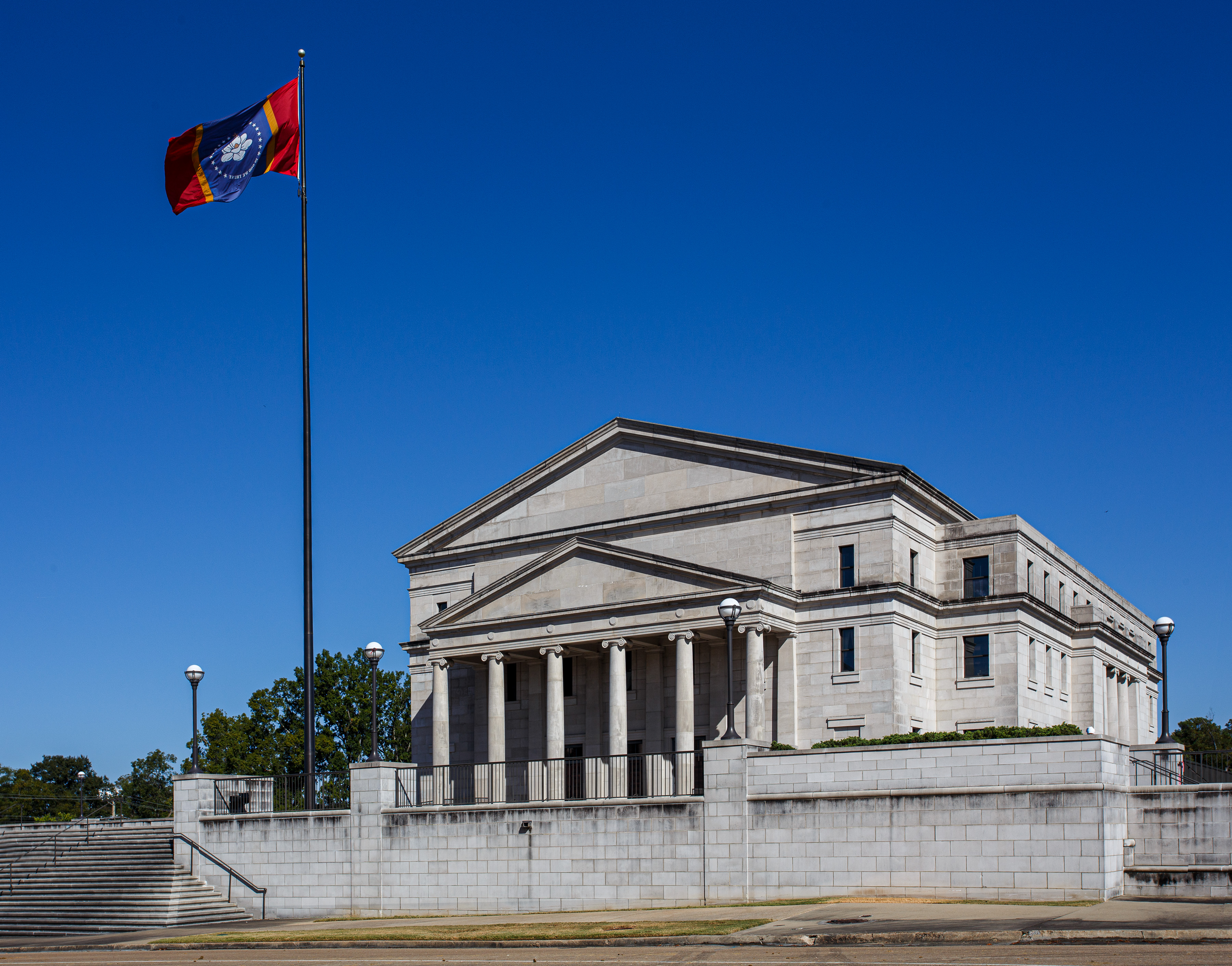
In 2023, the Supreme Court of Mississippi denied former NFL quarterback Brett Favre a motion to dismiss a lawsuit brought by the Mississippi Department of Human Services to recover at least $7 million in misspent TANF funds from Favre.

The Mississippi welfare funds scandal, also known as the Mississippi welfare fraud scheme, was a major welfare fraud investigation from 2020 to 2023 in the U.S. state of Mississippi, in which several high-profile figures were implicated in allegations of misuse regarding federal welfare funds that were traced to the Mississippi Department of Human Services. The investigation also uncovered attempted laundering of the funds through 501(c)(3) nonprofit organizations, in attempts to conceal the fraud. Investigative journalist Anna Wolfe, who reported the scandal for Mississippi Today, won the Pulitzer Prize for Local Reporting in 2023.

In February 2020, the office of the Mississippi State Auditor arrested six people it accused of mishandling federal funds disbursed by the Mississippi Department of Human Services, including the department's former director. In May, the auditor's office released a report identifying $94 million in questionable spending by the department, much of it being funneled through two nonprofits, the Mississippi Community Education Center and Family Resource Center of North Mississippi.

The auditing investigations found that the money was made available to several high-profile figures for various purposes, including three retired athletes: former professional football star Brett Favre and former wrestlers Brett DiBiase and Ted DiBiase Jr. The revelation of the state investigation also triggered a federal investigation.

==== New Jersey ====
===== Camden =====
Throughout the history of Camden, New Jersey, there have been several political corruption scandals that have engulfed the city and, at times, the nation. Three Camden mayors have been jailed for corruption: Angelo Errichetti, Arnold Webster, and Milton Milan. One other mayor of Camden, Dana Redd, was indicted alongside George Norcross, longtime Democratic Party powerbroker in corruption charges in 2024.

==== New York ====
===== New York City =====
Mayor Eric Adams speaks at a flag raising ceremony in celebration of the 100th Anniversary of the Republic of Turkey on October 27, 2023.

In spring 2023, the Federal Bureau of Investigation (FBI) and the United States Attorney for the Southern District of New York began a corruption investigation into alleged straw donors from the government of Turkey through construction company KSK Construction to Adams's 2021 campaign.

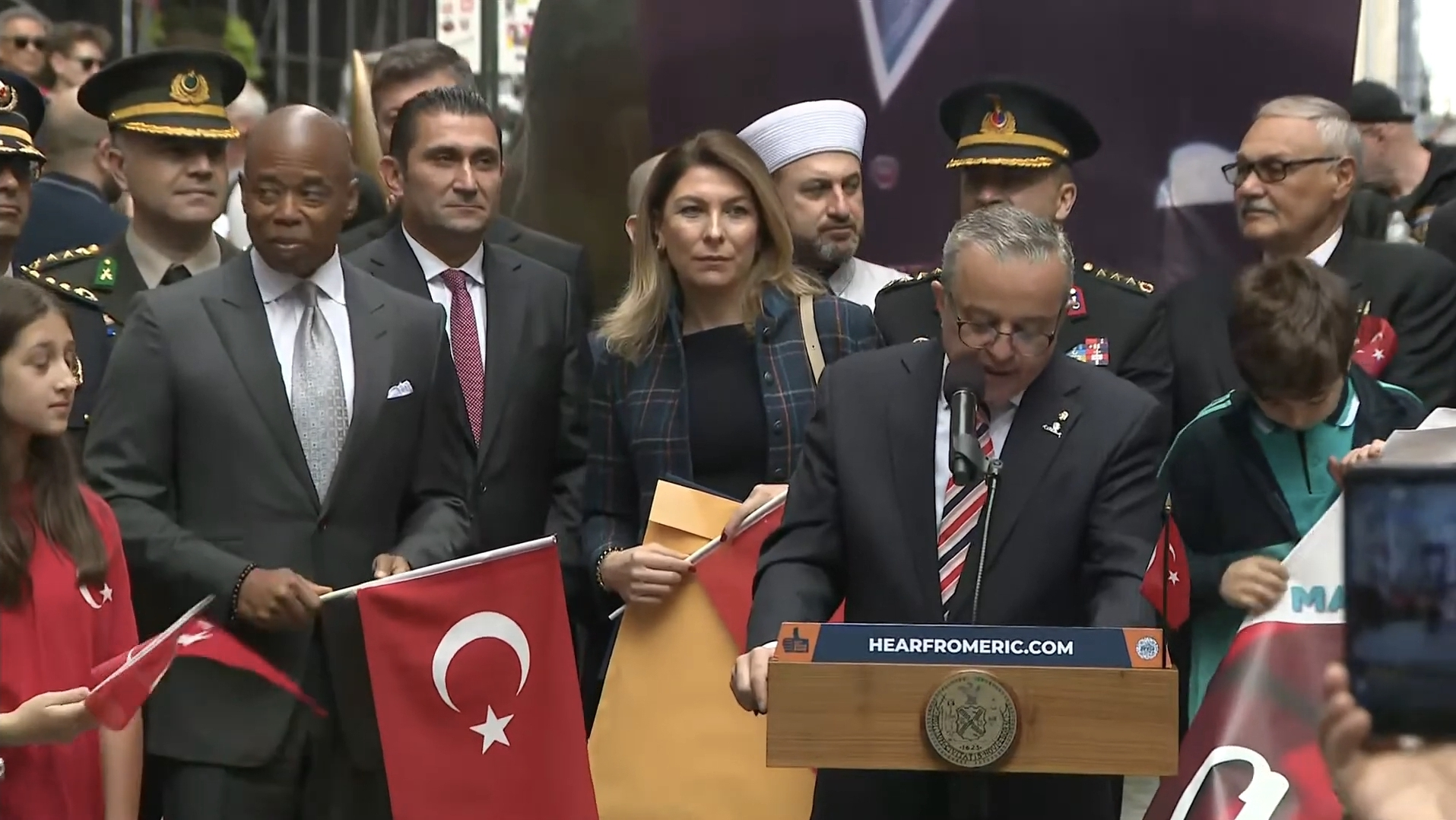
Eric Adams and Rana Abbasova in October 2023

On November 2, 2023, investigators raided the Brooklyn home of Brianna Suggs, Adams's chief fundraiser. The search warrant, obtained by The New York Times, states agents seized three iPhones, two laptops, contribution card binders, and other documents. The Federal Bureau of Investigation searched a dozen locations that day, including the residence of former Turkish Airlines executive Cenk Öcal and Director of Protocol in the Mayor's Office for International Affairs Rana Abbasova. On November 3, investigators questioned Nigro over the Turkish House. Days after the raid at Suggs's home, the FBI seized at least two of Adams's cellphones and an iPad. Adams's campaign cooperated with the FBI's request.

On April 5, 2024, the Times reported that the FBI was investigating flight upgrades Adams purportedly received on Turkish Airlines flights. In July, investigators served grand jury subpoenas.

In addition to the resignation and seizing of the phone of police commissioner Caban, Adams's counsel and chief legal adviser Lisa Zornberg resigned, as did deputy commissioner of public private partnerships and economic development Kristen Kaufman. Director of Asylum Seeker Operations Molly Schaeffer was also visited by law enforcement, who served a federal subpoena on her.

==== South Carolina ====
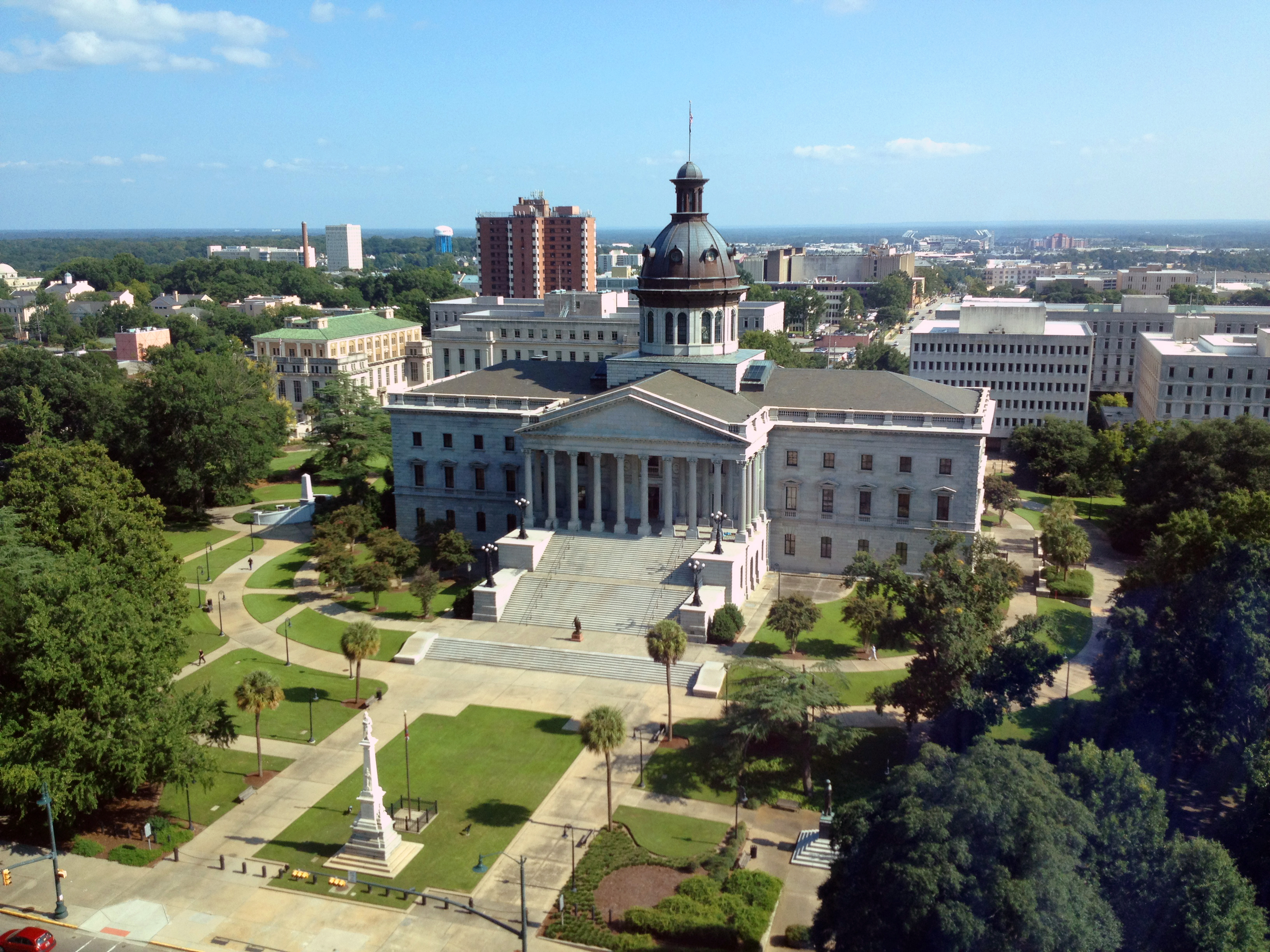
The South Carolina State House

The South Carolina Statehouse corruption investigation was a probe into unlawful interactions between members of the South Carolina General Assembly, the political firm of Richard Quinn, Sr., and major state institutions and corporations from 2013 to 2021. The influence of Quinn's consulting firm was called the Quinndom. By the end of the investigation, four members of the South Carolina General Assembly were indicted on public corruption charges. This investigation is often considered the most significant political scandal in the history of the state of South Carolina since Operation Lost Trust in 1989. Lost Trust directly influenced the passing of South Carolina's Ethics Reform Act of 1991, and led to the restructuring of the state government in 1993. The investigation raised questions about the effectiveness of that reform in the face of political corruption and dark money influence.

==== Texas ====
In October 2020, seven of Paxton's top aides published a letter to the office's director of human resources, accusing Paxton of improper influence, abuse of office, bribery and other crimes, and said they had provided information to law enforcement and asked them to investigate. The letter was signed by first assistant attorney general Jeff Mateer, and the deputy and deputy attorneys general overseeing the office's divisions for criminal investigations, civil litigation, administration, and policy. Paxton denied misconduct and said he would not resign. By the end of the month, all seven whistleblowers had left the office: three resigned, two were fired, and two were put on leave.

The allegations included that Paxton illegally used his office to benefit real estate developer Nate Paul, who had donated $25,000 to Paxton's 2018 campaign, and that Paxton advocated that Paul's company, World Class, hire a woman with whom Paxton had had an extramarital affair. Paul acknowledged employing the woman but denied that he had done so on Paxton's behalf.

In 2020, four of the former members of the attorney general's office sued their former employer, alleging that Paxton fired them for reporting misconduct to law enforcement, a form of illegal retaliation under the state's Whistleblower Act. The four ex-employees—who had served as Paxton's deputy attorney general for legal counsel, deputy attorney general for criminal justice; deputy attorney general, and director of the law enforcement division—were fired several weeks after bringing their concerns to the FBI and Texas Rangers. In 2021, the district court denied Paxton's motion to dismiss the suit. Paxton claimed that the Whistleblower Act did not apply to allegations of misconduct by elected executive officials such as himself, and that as an elected official he must have the power to control his top lieutenants, who are high-level political appointees, but in October 2021, the Texas Third Court of Appeals rejected his appeal, affirming the trial court's order.

In early February 2023, following mediation, Paxton agreed to a tentative settlement in which the whistleblowers would be paid $3.3 million. Under the settlement agreement, neither side admitted fault or liability, but Paxton "accept[ed] that plaintiffs acted in a manner that they thought was right and apologizes for referring to them as 'rogue employees.' " The settlement was contingent on securing "necessary approvals for funding" from the state. Paxton then asked the state to use taxpayer funds to pay the settlement. The legislature did not approve the settlement in the 2023 session. The accusations raised by the whistleblowers—that Paxton abused power to assist a wealthy donor in exchange for possible benefits, specifically a home remodel—later led to his impeachment by the Texas House of Representatives in May 2023.

Because a May 2023 deadline passed without payment, the settlement did not come into effect. The suit moved to the Texas Supreme Court, which ruled in September 2023 that the attorney general is subject to the Whistleblower Act. On April 5, 2025, Travis County district court judge Catherine Mauzy awarded $6.6 million combined to four whistleblowers.

Also in February 2023, the U.S. Justice Department's Public Integrity Section in Washington assumed an investigation of Paxton that had previously been managed by federal prosecutors in Texas.

=== Police corruption ===
Grand juries often decline to seek charges for U.S. police officers involved in violent activity due to the violent nature of policing, though some U.S. police have faced killing charges. Corruption cases and other non-violent crimes are more likely to be prosecuted.

== See also ==
- Campaign finance in the United States
- Conflict of interest
- Federal prosecution of public corruption in the United States
- List of United States federal officials convicted of corruption offenses
- List of United States state officials convicted of federal corruption offenses
- List of United States local officials convicted of federal corruption offenses
