= Zhang Li =

Zhang Li may refer to:

- Zhang Li (Liao dynasty) (died 947), Later Tang and Liao dynasty official
- Zhang Li (entrepreneur) (born 1953), Chinese entrepreneur and billionaire
- Zhang Li (director) (born 1954), Chinese cinematographer and director
- Zhang Li, a fictional character in the video game franchise Perfect Dark
- Zhang Li (actress) (张俪, born 1984), Chinese actress
- Li Zhang (biologist), American biologist

== Sportspeople ==
=== Javelin throw ===
- Zhang Li (javelin thrower, born 1961), Chinese javelin thrower
- Zhang Li (javelin thrower, born 1978), Chinese javelin thrower
- Zhang Li (javelin thrower, born 1989), Chinese javelin thrower

=== Association football ===
- Zhang Li (footballer, born February 1989), Chinese footballer who played for the clubs Chongqing, Chengdu and Jiangxi
- Zhang Li (footballer, born August 1989), Chinese footballer who played for the clubs Henan and Wuhan

=== Others ===
- Zhang Li (table tennis) (born 1951), Chinese table tennis player
- Zhang Li (speed skater) (born 1963), Chinese speed skater
- Zhang Li (handballer) (born 1976), Chinese handball player
- Zhang Li (baseball) (born 1980), Chinese baseball player
- Zhang Li (fencer) (born 1981), Chinese épée fencer
- Zhang Li (swimmer) (born 1998), Chinese Paralympic swimmer
