= William Orrick III =

American judge (born 1953)

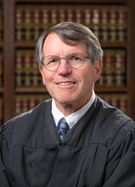

Senior Judge of the United States District Court for the Northern District of California
- Incumbent
- Assumed office May 17, 2023

Judge of the United States District Court for the Northern District of California
- In office May 16, 2013 – May 17, 2023
- Appointed by: Barack Obama
- Preceded by: Charles Breyer
- Succeeded by: Eumi K. Lee

Personal details
- Born: William Horsley Orrick III; 1953 (age 72–73) San Francisco, California, U.S.
- Parent: William H. Orrick Jr. (father)
- Relatives: Howard Christian Naffziger (grandfather); Andrew Downey Orrick (uncle)
- Education: Yale University (BA); Boston College (JD)

William Horsley Orrick III (born 1953) is an American lawyer who serves as a senior United States district judge of the United States District Court for the Northern District of California. He had a long career as a lawyer in private practice in San Francisco, and served as a Deputy Assistant Attorney General in the Civil Division of the United States Department of Justice during the Obama administration.

== Early life and education ==
Orrick was born in San Francisco in 1953. His father, William H. Orrick Jr. (1915–2003), was a United States District Judge for the Northern District of California and served as Assistant Attorney General for the Civil Division in the John F. Kennedy administration. His mother, Marion Naffziger Orrick (d. 1995), was active in San Francisco civic life. Orrick's uncle, Andrew Downey Orrick, was acting chairman of the U.S. Securities and Exchange Commission in San Francisco.

Orrick received his Bachelor of Arts, cum laude, from Yale University in 1976. He received his Juris Doctor, cum laude, from Boston College Law School in 1979.

== Career ==
From 1977 to 1979 he was a student attorney for the Boston College Legal Assistance Bureau. After graduating, Orrick worked from 1979 to 1984 at the Georgia Legal Services Program in Savannah, providing legal aid services to low-income Georgians. Upon returning to San Francisco, he chose to join William Coblentz's Coblentz, Patch, Duffy & Bass LLP, rather than the law firm co-founded by his grandfather William Orrick Sr., Orrick, Herrington & Sutcliffe. Orrick practiced at the Coblentz firm for about 25 years, from 1984 to 2009. He joined as an associate in 1984 and was promoted to partner in 1988. Orrick then served in the Civil Division of the U.S. Department of Justice, first as counselor (June 2009 – June 2010) and then as deputy assistant attorney general (June 2010 – 2013), heading the Office of Immigration Litigation. Orrick returned to Coblentz, Patch, Duffy & Bass for ten months while his nomination to the district court was pending in the Senate.

=== Federal judicial service ===
On June 11, 2012, President Barack Obama nominated Orrick to be a United States district judge of the United States District Court for the Northern District of California, to the seat vacated by Judge Charles Breyer, who assumed senior status on December 31, 2011. The American Bar Association's Standing Committee on the Federal Judiciary, which rates the qualifications of federal judicial nominees, unanimously rated Orrick "well qualified" for the judgeship (the committee's highest rating). The Senate Judiciary Committee held a hearing on Orrick's nomination on July 11, 2012. His nomination was reported out of committee on August 2, 2012, by a 12–6 vote. However, his nomination was blocked by Senate Republicans, and on January 2, 2013, his nomination was returned to the President, due to the adjournment sine die of the Senate at the end of the 112th Congress. The next day, January 3, 2013, he was renominated to the same office. His nomination was reported by the Senate Judiciary Committee on February 28, 2013, by a 11–7 vote. The U.S. Senate confirmed his nomination on May 15, 2013, by a 56–41 vote, with three senators not voting. The confirmation vote was mostly on party lines, with all Democrats and three Republican Senators (Jeff Flake, Susan Collins, and Lisa Murkowski) voting to confirm Orrick and all other Republicans voting against confirmation. He received his commission the following day. He assumed senior status on May 17, 2023.

As a federal judge, Orrick established chambers in the Phillip Burton Federal Building in San Francisco.

=== Notable cases ===
In 2014, Orrick upheld California state legislation that banned the possession and sale of shark fin, a prohibition aimed at stopping the practice of shark finning. Orrick rejected the claim of a group of San Francisco Bay Area Chinese American businesses and shark fin suppliers that the ban was unconstitutionally discriminatory. Orrick wrote that although "people of Chinese origin or culture undoubtedly overwhelmingly comprise the market for shark fin, ... a law is not unconstitutional simply because it has a racially disparate impact." Orrick's dismissal of the case was affirmed on appeal.

In 2015, Orrick denied a motion filed by Pacific Gas and Electric Co. (PG&E) to dismiss the case against it arising from pollution discharges into San Francisco Bay by PG&E's manufactured fuel gas (oil and coal) power plants decades earlier. Orrick held that PG&E's refusal to test for groundwater contamination at the former plants gave rise to a continuing "imminent and substantial endangerment" to the environment and human health, particularly in the Marina District and Fisherman's Wharf neighborhoods. In 2018, Orrick approved a settlement of the case, in which PG&E agreed to monitor and potentially clean up pollution from its old sites and agreed to make payments to a conservation organization and habitat restoration efforts.

Orrick is the judge assigned to oversee the reforms of the Oakland Police Department mandated by the department's 2003 settlement of Allen v. City of Oakland, a long-running case involving systemic police misconduct. In hearings, Orrick has pushed the department to make more progress on reforms. Robert Warshaw is the court-appointed monitor of the Oakland Police Department reforms. In March 2019, Orrick appointed an attorney to serve as an independent investigator to probe the killing of a homeless man with mental health problems who was shot by Oakland police in 2018. At an August 2019 court conference, Orrick criticized the city for not making sufficient progress in eliminating racial disparities in policing.

In 2015, Orrick issued a temporary restraining order (TRO) blocking the Center for Medical Progress (CMP), an anti-abortion group, from releasing secretly recorded videos of the National Abortion Federation (NAF). CMP had earlier released heavily edited videos, which purported to show that Planned Parenthood had been inappropriately selling fetal tissue. In his decision granting a restraining order, Orrick wrote that a TRO was necessary to prevent irreparable harm to NAF "in the form of harassment, intimidation, violence, invasion of privacy, and injury to reputation, and the requested relief is in the public interest." In subsequent proceedings, Orrick reviewed hundreds of hours of videos and found no evidence of wrongdoing on NAF's behalf, and concluded that the CMP, led by anti-abortion activist David Daleiden, had "misleadingly edited videos to make it appear as though abortion providers were breaking the law." In 2016, Orrick subsequently issued a preliminary injunction against CMP blocking the release of their videos; after Daleiden violated the injunction, Orrick found Daleiden and his two attorneys in civil contempt and fined them $195,000. The contempt finding was upheld on appeal.

In April 2017, Orrick stayed the implementation of the Trump administration's Executive Order 13768 to withhold funding from sanctuary cities that limit cooperation with U.S. Immigration and Customs Enforcement authorities, saying Trump had no authority to attach new conditions to federal spending. In November 2017, Orrick ruled in favor of the City and County of San Francisco and County of Santa Clara (who challenged the order), finding that Section 9(a) of the Executive Order was unconstitutional on its face as a violation of the separation of powers doctrine and the counties' Tenth and Fifth Amendment rights and issuing a nationwide permanent injunction against its implementation. In 2018, Orrick's ruling was upheld on appeal, but the scope of the injunction was narrowed to San Francisco and Santa Clara.

In February 2018, Orrick issued a preliminary injunction ordering the Trump administration to enforce limits on methane emissions from oil and gas wells on federal and tribal land. Orrick's order directed the U.S. Bureau of Land Management to halt the Trump administration's suspension of an Obama administration-era regulations that required fossil-fuel extractors on federal lands to take steps to reduce flaring and venting, and thus prevent methane leakage.

In April 2022, Orrick cut the jury award for a former Black contractor in a racial discrimination lawsuit against Tesla from $137 million to $15 million. Diaz' lawyer told NPR that "it wasn't because [Orrick] found anything wrong with what Mr. Diaz said or that Mr. Diaz wasn't injured", suggesting that the decision was "just based on a comparison."

In July 2023, he denied Sarah Andersen, Kelly McKernan, and Karla Ortiz's copyright infringement lawsuit against Stability AI, Midjourney, and DeviantArt. Orrick stated would dismiss most of the case, requesting they elaborate on issues and "provide more facts".

==== San Francisco Public Works corruption scandal ====
Since 2020, Orrick has been involved in the plea deals, trials and sentencing of people guilty of fraud and bribery in the ongoing San Francisco Department of Public Works corruption scandal. The sentences that Orrick has handed down include:

- Former head of Public Works, Mohammed Nuru was sentenced to seven years in jail for fraud.
- Restaurateur Nick Bovis was sentenced to nine months in prison after Bovis pleaded guilty to honest services wire fraud.
- Sandra Zuniga, head of San Francisco's "Fix-It Team" and of the Mayor’s Office of Neighborhood Service and Nuru's one-time girlfriend was sentenced to three years probation for money laundering.
- Former Recology executive Paul Giusti was sentenced to three years probation for bribing Nuru.
- John Porter, another former Recology executive was sentenced to 6 months house arrest and three years probation for bribing Nuru
- Ken Hong Wong, a former California parole officer, was sentenced to six months in prison for bribing Nuru.
- A Chinese billionaire, Zhang Li was sentenced to a $50,000 fine and three years probation for bribing Nuru. One of Zhang's companies, Z&L properties, pleaded guilty to federal fraud and conspiracy charges and was fined $1 million.
- Balmore Hernandez, the former CEO of a San Francisco Bay Area based construction firm, Azul Works Inc., admitted to conspiracy to commit honest services wire fraud and was sentenced to six months in prison.

Legal offices
| Preceded by Charles Breyer | Judge of the United States District Court for the Northern District of California; 2013–2023 | Succeeded by Eumi K. Lee |
