= San Francisco Parks Alliance =

American organization (2011–2025)

- Formation: 2011; 15 years ago
- Dissolved: June 2025; 1 year ago
- Website: San Francisco Parks Alliance at the Wayback Machine (archived May 24, 2025)

The San Francisco Parks Alliance (SFPA) was a U.S. non-profit organization dedicated to supporting, improving, and advocating for parks and public spaces throughout San Francisco. According to its website, it was the only city-wide parks nonprofit in San Francisco and had been active for over 50 years. It was created in 2011 by the merger of the San Francisco Parks Council and the San Francisco Parks Trust.

== History ==
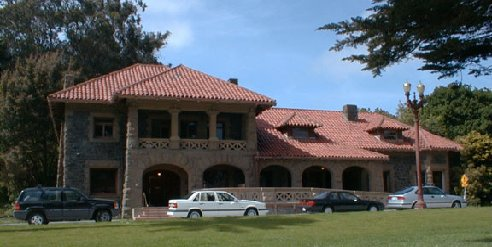
Historic McLaren Lodge, site of San Francisco Parks Trust offices

In 1971, the Friends of Recreation and Parks was founded with the support of a $50,000 grant from philanthropist Walter Shorenstein. Its initial mission was to serve as a philanthropic partner and fiscal agent for the San Francisco Recreation & Parks Department, aiming to bring more resources and attention to the city's parks. In 2011, a merger between two predecessor organizations, San Francisco Parks Trust (formerly Friends of Recreation and Parks) and the Neighborhood Parks Council, created the San Francisco Parks Alliance.

== Programs ==
The SFPA partnered with the San Francisco Recreation & Parks Department and San Francisco Public Works, as well as community organizations, to facilitate the construction and maintenance of parks and community gardens. The SFPA also sponsored guides giving tours of Golden Gate Park, as well as partnering with San Francisco Opera and San Francisco Chronicle Charities to present "Opera in the Park". The SFPA ran a series of popular outdoor evening movie screenings in various parks around the city, but the program was abruptly cancelled as its financial situation worsened.

== Financial scandals and closure ==
In 2020, the San Francisco Parks Alliance was linked to a federal corruption probe involving the former head of San Francisco Department of Public Works Mohammed Nuru and the San Francisco-based waste management company, Recology. Nuru used the SFPA as a conduit for what federal prosecutors described as a "slush fund." He controlled an account at the SFPA, and contractors, including Recology, funneled money through this account, often via other nonprofits, to curry favor with Nuru, who had significant influence over city contracts and garbage rates. These funds were then used by Nuru for staff parties, merchandise, and other discretionary expenses that benefited his department and associates. A federal investigation found that from 2014 to 2019, Recology funneled about $900,000 to a Nuru-controlled account at the SFPA in an attempt to influence him. This arrangement contributed to a broader "pay-to-play" culture in San Francisco city government, as described in city controller reports.

In 2021, San Francisco Supervisor Connie Chan raised concerns and called for investigations into the financial practices and influence of the SFPA. She questioned the SFPA's handling of donations, its role in city contracts, and broader issues of transparency and ethics. After Chan and Supervisor Aaron Peskin called for an investigation into the SFPA's finances, the Alliance responded by sending a letter to Chan. In this letter, CEO Drew Becher threatened to withdraw over $2 million in funding for the Richmond Playground—a project in Chan's district—unless she recanted her public statements and criticisms of the organization. This $2 million represented about two-thirds of the playground's total budget.

At a subsequent public hearing, Supervisor Shamann Walton read the letter into the record, stating that it "implied that if Chan didn't back off, she would lose a community playground." Walton described the letter as "100 percent a threat" that "should not be tolerated." The incident sparked concern among city officials, with Supervisors Chan, Peskin, and Walton interrogating Parks and Recreation Department Director Phil Ginsburg about his knowledge of the threat. There was speculation and accusation that Ginsburg was aware of, or complicit in, the SFPA's actions, though he denied prior knowledge. The SFPA later apologized for the "tone and mannerism" of the letter, but the episode was widely seen as an attempt to use financial leverage to silence a public official's oversight and criticism.

At Chan's request, the San Francisco Board of Supervisors Budget and Legislative Analyst's Office (BLA) reviewed contracts between the SFPA and the San Francisco Recreation and Parks Department (RPD). The review concluded that "...adequate controls against the possibility of corruption and financial transparency were found lacking." The report also reported that the SFPA had received up to $3 million in anonymous donations, possibly violating the city's sunshine ordinance. Some of the issues raised by the BLA report were addressed in a memorandum of understanding between the RPD and SFPA.

In 2025, the SFPA admitted to improperly spending at least $3.8 million in restricted funds—money that donors had earmarked for specific projects—on its own operating expenses. This included approximately $1.9 million from the Baker Street Foundation meant for playgrounds at Crane Cove Park, which have not materialized despite years of waiting by local families. (Note: The Port of San Francisco subsequently funded the improvements at Crane Cove Park.) The nonprofit acts as a fiscal sponsor for over 80 smaller organizations, holding and managing their funds. Many of these groups have reported long waits, sometimes months, to get reimbursed for basic expenses, even as the Parks SFPA's own operating costs ballooned. As the organization's finances deteriorated, top staff received salary increases and cash bonuses—a move criticized by nonprofit ethics experts given the circumstances. The Parks SFPA also lost money on fundraising events and saw key sources of grant funding dry up. Former staff members reported that senior executives and the board of directors were aware of the financial mismanagement as early as 2017, but dismissed staff concerns.

On June 2, 2025, local media reported that the SFPA was planning to permanently shut down. The SFPA's board of trustees voted to end all operations and lay off staff. By the next day, all staff had been fired and the organization had hired a consulting firm to manage the closure, using a process known as "assignment for the benefit of creditors", which can avoid formal bankruptcy procedures. The organization had assets of $1.6 million and debts of $4.6 million, including debts to the city of over $1 million. In late June 2025 the Alliance's website was replaced by a single page announcing the closure and providing details for creditors to file a financial claim.

=== Investigations and audits ===
As the extent of the financial scandal became widely known, the city took action to investigate the SFPA. Mayor Daniel Lurie canceled city contracts with the organization. The San Francisco District Attorney's Office has launched a criminal investigation into the SFPA, focusing on public integrity and white-collar crime. The San Francisco City Attorney's Office is conducting a parallel probe, which could result in lawsuits. Supervisor Jackie Fielder called for an audit of the Recreation and Parks Department in light of the Parks Alliance scandal.

After senior SFPA staff failed to appear at a scheduled meeting of the Government Audit and Oversight Committee of the Board of Supervisors and also failed to respond to written questions from the committee, Supervisors Walton and Fielder issued subpoenas to former chief executive officers Robert Ogilvie and Drew Becher and former treasurer, Rich Hutchison, forcing them to appear and testify at a future meeting of the committee.

In July 2025, the San Francisco Board of Supervisors' Government Audit and Oversight Committee convened a hearing to discuss the allegations of fiscal mismanagement by the SFPA. Becher, Ogilvie and Hutchinson appeared in response to subpoenas from the committee. Committee members Fielder, Danny Sauter, and Stephen Sherrill were joined by Supervisor Walton. The questioning focused on the alleged misuse of at least $3.8 million in restricted funds, which had been intended for specific public projects but were diverted to cover the nonprofit's operating costs. The former executives faced questions regarding the breakdown in financial oversight and the timeline of when they became aware of the fund mismanagement. Their testimonies were often evasive, leading to visible frustration among supervisors and public commenters, many of whom accused the nonprofit's leadership of dodging accountability. They asserted they were not fully aware of the extent of the fund diversions until after problems had already unfolded. They cited internal breakdowns and staff departures for their lack of direct insight into routine financial operations. They claimed the board was either not informed in a timely manner about cash flow shortfalls and fund reallocations, or that early warnings were not clearly escalated as signs of mismanagement.

Becher and Hutchinson blamed Justin Probert, the former chief operating officer, finance and administration. Becher said Probert had never logged into the organization’s financial software during his tenure at the nonprofit.

Supervisor Walton criticized the SFPA executives for their claims of ignorance regarding the misuse of restricted funds. He questioned former CEO Drew Becher directly: "When did you start using restricted funds on organizational expenses?" to which Becher was unable to provide a clear answer. Walton expressed disbelief that leadership could be so unaware of significant financial activity. He said, "You were at worst negligent and inept. I don't believe for one minute that you didn't know what the CFO was doing." Walton also highlighted the damage the Alliance's failure had caused to community organizations, stating that the impact "cannot be underestimated."

Supervisor Fielder challenged the executives on their responsibilities, asking whether the board and executive team had a moral or legal responsibility to make the city and community groups whole after the financial losses they suffered due to the Alliance's mismanagement. She voiced strong disappointment at the lack of accountability shown by the former leaders, noting that victims of the Alliance's collapse included local organizations whose donated funds were effectively lost.

Supervisor Sherrill called the SFPA a Ponzi scheme, and directly asked Becher: "Where is the money now?"

== See also ==
- San Francisco Human Rights Commission—Corruption scandal
- San Francisco Department of Public Works corruption scandal
