= San Francisco Ethics Commission =

American local public agency

The San Francisco Ethics Commission is a regulatory body established to uphold ethical standards in city government. Its mandate encompasses several critical functions aimed at promoting transparency, accountability, and integrity among public officials and employees.

The commissions by-laws include:

- Inform candidates for public office, public employees, and the general public about existing ethics laws and rules.
- Enforce all ethics laws, including those related to campaign finance, lobbying, conflicts of interest, and open government.
- Recommend new laws and programs that enhance ethical compliance within the city. It has the authority under the San Francisco Charter to submit measures directly to voters. (Note: For example, in 2024 the commission voted to place an ethics reform package on the ballot to enhance gift rules for city officials.)
- Serve as a model for ethical behavior for other elected and appointed officials as well as government employees.
- Conduct audits and investigations related to ethics violations. This includes the authority to subpoena witnesses and documents when necessary.
- Provide informal advice to individuals seeking to comply with ethics regulations, as well as formal opinions which offer immunity from enforcement if acted upon correctly.
- Manage the public financing program for candidates running for office in San Francisco

== Establishment ==
The Ethics Commission was placed on the ballot by seven members of the Board of Supervisors. Supervisors Angela Alioto, Sue Bierman, Terence Hallinan, Barbara Kaufman, Susan Leal, Carole Migden, and Kevin Shelley voted in favor of the proposition. Supervisors Annemarie Conroy, Bill J. Maher, Tom Hsieh, and Willie B. Kennedy opposed it.

The measure was placed on the November 1993 ballot, known as Proposition K.

The measure was supported by the county Democratic Party, the Chamber of Commerce, the Labor Council, Common Cause, and many other political leaders. It was opposed by a committee named Citizens Against Putting the Foxes in Charge of the Hen Coop and the San Francisco Taxpayers Association. The latter included future Ethics Commissioner Quentin Kopp, then a State Senator, who authored the ballot handbook’s paid argument against Proposition K.

The proposition passed with 52.0% of voters in favor, 47.9% opposed.

== Notable Rulings ==
=== San Franciscans Against the Blank Check – No on D Committee ===
In 2002, Proposition D was put on the ballot by a majority of the San Francisco Board of Supervisors. By amending the city charter, Proposition D would have made the San Francisco Public Utilities Commission the main supplier of electricity to San Francisco businesses and residents. In order to defeat the initiative, Pacific Gas and Electric Co. (PG&E) gave $800,000 to a political action committee, San Franciscans Against the Blank Check – No on D Committee. Both the committee and PG&E acknowledged that they had neglected to reveal this contribution before the election. Following investigations into the failure to report, the California Fair Political Practices Commission (FPPC) and the San Francisco Ethics Commission each imposed fines of $140,000 and $100,000, respectively. This was one of the biggest fines the FPPC had ever assessed and the biggest fine the ethics commission had ever imposed at the time. The fines were paid by the committee's legal firm. The committee spent $2.7 million to defeat the proposition that was subsequently rejected by voters by 54% to 46%.

=== District Attorney Kamala Harris ===
Kamala Harris faced a campaign finance ethics violation in 2003 when she broke a voluntary $211,000 spending cap for the San Francisco district attorney's race. The Ethics Commission found that the violations appeared to be unintentional and levied a penalty of $34,000, reduced from the potential maximum penalty of $65,000.

=== Sheriff Ross Mirkarimi ===
The commission conducted an extensive investigation into official misconduct charges against Sheriff Ross Mirkarimi stemming from a domestic violence incident with his wife Eliana Lopez in 2012. The commission held multiple hearings, reviewed evidence, and heard testimony over several months.

In August 2012, after lengthy deliberations, the commission found by a 4-1 vote that Mirkarimi had engaged in official misconduct by inflicting physical violence on his wife and pleading guilty to false imprisonment charges. However, the commission rejected other allegations leveled by Mayor Ed Lee, who had suspended Mirkarimi from office.

The commission's findings were forwarded to the San Francisco Board of Supervisors, who had the ultimate authority to decide whether to permanently remove Mirkarimi as sheriff. After further review and public hearings, including Mirkarimi's own testimony asking for redemption, the Board of Supervisors voted 7-4 in October 2012 to reinstate him as sheriff.

=== Mark Farrell ===
==== 2010 campaign for supervisor ====
Mark Farrell, a former San Francisco supervisor, faced an ethics violation related to his 2010 campaign for supervisor. The issue centered around illegal coordination between Farrell's campaign and an independent expenditure committee called Common Sense Voters.

The violation occurred when Farrell's campaign consultant, Chris Lee, coordinated with the independent committee, which received large donations from Thomas Coates ($141,000) and Dede Wilsey ($50,000). Campaign laws prohibit coordination between independent and candidate committees.

Initially, the San Francisco Ethics Commission levied a $191,000 fine against Farrell in 2015. However, Farrell refused to pay this fine, arguing through his attorney that he had done nothing wrong and that the action was barred by the statute of limitations. In 2016, the Commission reduced the fine and Farrell settled the matter by paying $25,000 to the city.

The California Fair Political Practices Commission (FPPC) conducted a separate investigation and concluded that Farrell himself did not authorize the coordination. Instead, they fined Lee $14,500.

==== 2024 mayoral campaign ====
In November 2024, just days before the 5 November election, Farrell agreed to pay a $108,179 settlement, which, at that time, was the largest fine in Ethics Commission history. This penalty arose from allegations that he improperly used funds from a political action committee (PAC) he established to support a ballot measure (Proposition D) for his own mayoral campaign, effectively circumventing the city's $500 contribution limit for candidates. Farrell signed a settlement agreement on October 25, 2024, acknowledging his responsibility for the violations.

The Ethics Commission found that Farrell had taken nearly $94,000 from the PAC and used it for his campaign, with investigators noting that the two committees shared expenses amounting to $239,099 without proper reimbursement. This practice allowed him to receive unlimited contributions through the PAC while his mayoral campaign was restricted to smaller donations.

Farrell publicly accepted responsibility for what he termed an "accounting error," asserting that he had corrected the issues prior to the settlement. However, the commission's investigation revealed numerous communications indicating that the commingling of funds was intentional.

=== Supervisor Eric Mar ===
Former Supervisor Eric Mar was fined $16,690.50 by the Ethics Commission and an additional $9,500 by the California Fair Political Practices Commission for accepting tickets to events in public lands in his District. He later admitted to not understanding the rules.

=== Mayor London Breed ===
In 2021, San Francisco Mayor London Breed was fined $22,792 for a series of ethics violations, including misusing her title as mayor for personal gain and violating laws on accepting gifts and campaign contributions. Breed acknowledged the violations and agreed to pay the fines.

Three incidents led to Breed's fine:

1. In 2018, Breed asked then-Governor Jerry Brown to commute the prison sentence of her brother, Napoleon Brown, in a letter that was deemed a misuse of her city title. She was fined $2,500 for this violation.
2. Breed accepted a gift of about $5,600 in car repairs from Mohammed Nuru, the disgraced former head of the public works department, whom she acknowledged dating briefly two decades ago. The Ethics Commission found that she violated laws by accepting this gift and fined her $8,292.
3. In 2015, while a member of the San Francisco Board of Supervisors, Breed solicited two restaurateurs to each pay $1,250 directly to a Pride parade float without properly recording these contributions in campaign finance disclosures. These donations exceeded the $500 limit per person set for campaign contributions. Breed was fined a total of $12,000 for these two violations.

In October 2024, the San Francisco Sunshine Ordinance Task Force unanimously ruled that Breed and City Attorney David Chiu had violated the city's Open Government and Sunshine Ordinance by routinely deleting texts involving government business from their personal phones. Although the task force referred its findings to the Ethics Commission, the Commission did not take any action after Breed left office in 2025.

=== Neighbors for a Better San Francisco Advocacy ===
In August 2024, Neighbors for a Better San Francisco Advocacy, a prominent political action committee in San Francisco, was fined nearly $54,000 by the Ethics Commission for failing to disclose campaign payments during the recall of former District Attorney Chesa Boudin. The group, led by Jay Cheng and backed by Republican donor William Oberndorf, was a major financial supporter of the recall effort, contributing $4.7 million out of a total $7.25 million raised. The Ethics Commission found that Neighbors for a Better San Francisco did not report $187,084 in payments to Riff City Strategies, a public relations firm that provided media relations services for the recall campaign. These payments were not disclosed as required by city law, which mandates that any expenditures made on behalf of a campaign be clearly labeled and made available to the public. The investigation revealed that the consulting firm's work for the recall campaign was substantially similar to the services it provided for Neighbors for a Better San Francisco, which should have been reported as contributions to the recall effort. Although the commission found no wrongdoing by Riff City Strategies or its president Jess Montejano, the failure to disclose these payments violated San Francisco's campaign finance disclosure laws.
