= San Francisco Human Rights Commission =

American local charter commission

The San Francisco Human Rights Commission (HRC) is a charter commission of San Francisco that works to increase equality, eradicate discrimination, and to protect human rights. The HRC enforces city ordinances and policies on nondiscrimination and promotes social and economic progress.

== History ==
An Interim Committee on Human Relations, created by Mayor John F. Shelley, made the recommendation to the San Francisco Board of Supervisors to create a permanent Human Rights Commission. The recommendation was approved by the Board of Supervisors and Shelley in July 1964. The commission was codified as a charter commission by the San Francisco voters in June 1990.

== Scope of activities ==
According to its website, The San Francisco Human Rights Commission (HRC) is a department of the City and County of San Francisco that "works in service of the City's anti-discrimination laws by protecting civil rights, upholding dignity, and advancing equitable outcomes in San Francisco." Its Civil Rights Division "investigates and mediates discrimination complaints in housing, employment, and access to public places."

== Corruption scandal ==
The Commission became the focus of a corruption scandal in 2024–2025 after a report revealed misuse of public money by its director, Sheryl Davis. Davis oversaw the Dream Keeper Initiative—a program created under former Mayor London Breed to provide grant money to historically marginalized Black communities. An investigation and report by The San Francisco Standard raised concerns that Davis directed funds to projects and nonprofits with personal ties, most notably to Collective Impact, whose executive director, James Spingola, was living with Davis. Davis resigned in September 2024. The city attorney and the San Francisco district attorney launched separate investigations into the alleged fraud and misuse of funds. The city attorney sought to ban Collective Impact from receiving city grants for five years, a move that would cause the nonprofit to close.

The scandal prompted Mayor Daniel Lurie to merge the Human Rights Commission and the Department on the Status of Women into a new department, the Agency on Human Rights, and cut the commission's budget by 38% to $28 million, aiming to increase oversight and restore public trust.

In September 2025, an audit by the city attorney and the city controller showed the commission had made "prohibited purchases" totalling millions of dollars, including lavish trips to Martha's Vineyard, a full-court-side purchase of 500 San Francisco Giants tickets, tuition payments, restaurant buy-outs and a house rental that appeared unrelated to the agency's mission.

In March 2026, Davis and Spingola were arrested and booked into San Francisco city jail after surrendering to authorities. Davis was charged by the San Francisco District Attorney with 19 offenses, including misappropriation of public funds and perjury. Spingola was charged with aiding and abetting a conflict of interest in a government contract.

== Reports and publications ==
=== Commission ===
- Community Concerns of Surveillance, Racial and Religious Profiling of Arab, Middle Eastern, Muslim, and South Asian Communities and Potential Reactivation of SFPD Intelligence Gathering (February 2011)
- Discrimination by Omission: Issues of Concern for Native Americans in San Francisco (August 2007)
- Racial Privacy Initiative (2006)
- Violence In Our City: Research and Recommendations to Empower Our Community (December 2001)
- Compliance Guidelines To Prohibit Weight and Height Discrimination (July 2001)

=== Lesbian Gay Bisexual Transgender Advisory Committee Reports/Hearings ===
- Bisexual Invisibility: Impacts and Recommendations (March 2011) Archived 2013-10-04 at the Wayback Machine
- A Human Rights Investigation Into the "Normalization" of Intersex People (April 2005)
- Aging in the Lesbian Gay Bisexual Transgender Communities (April 2003)
- Economic Empowerment for the Lesbian Gay Bisexual Transgender Communities (November 2000)
- Investigation into the Needs of Lesbian, Gay, Bisexual, Transgender, Queer, and Questiong Youth (1997)
- Investigation into Discrimination Against Transgendered People (September 1994)

== See also ==
- San Francisco Department of Public Works corruption scandal
- San Francisco Parks Alliance—Financial scandals and closure
