= High Bridge Arms =

Coordinates: 37.74592°N 122.41945°W

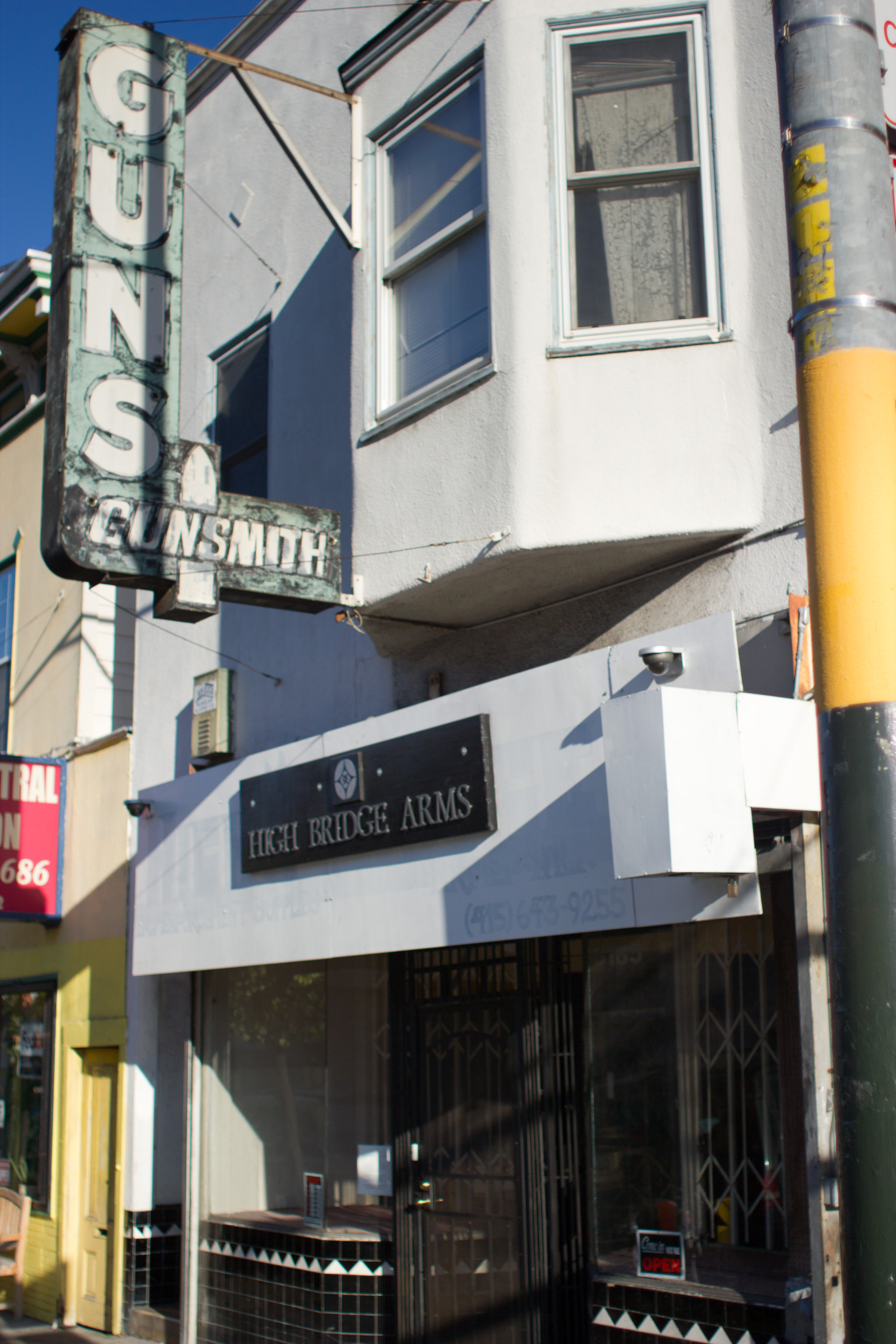
The exterior of the High Bridge Arms store in 2012

High Bridge Arms was a gun shop located in the city of San Francisco, California.

It was originally opened in the 1950s by Bob Chow, who had competed as a pistol shooter at the 1948 Olympics. It was located at 3185 Mission Street in the city's Bernal Heights neighborhood.

High Bridge Arms has been a point of controversy as to whether it is creating crime in the area of its location. It closed in the past but was open and licensed as of 2012.

High Bridge Arms closed in late 2015. While the owner did not publicly state a reason, media reports connected the closure to the concerns he had voiced several weeks earlier about new city regulations on firearms sales that were being proposed by Board of Supervisors member Mark Farrell. However, in 2018 it was revealed that shortly before the closure, ATF officials had recommended to revoke the license of High Bridge Arms because of "numerous, repeated serious violations of the Gun Control Act", including, allegedly, selling a firearm to a person prohibited from possessing it, and selling 71 guns without recording the sale.
