= Eumi K. Lee =

American judge (born 1972)

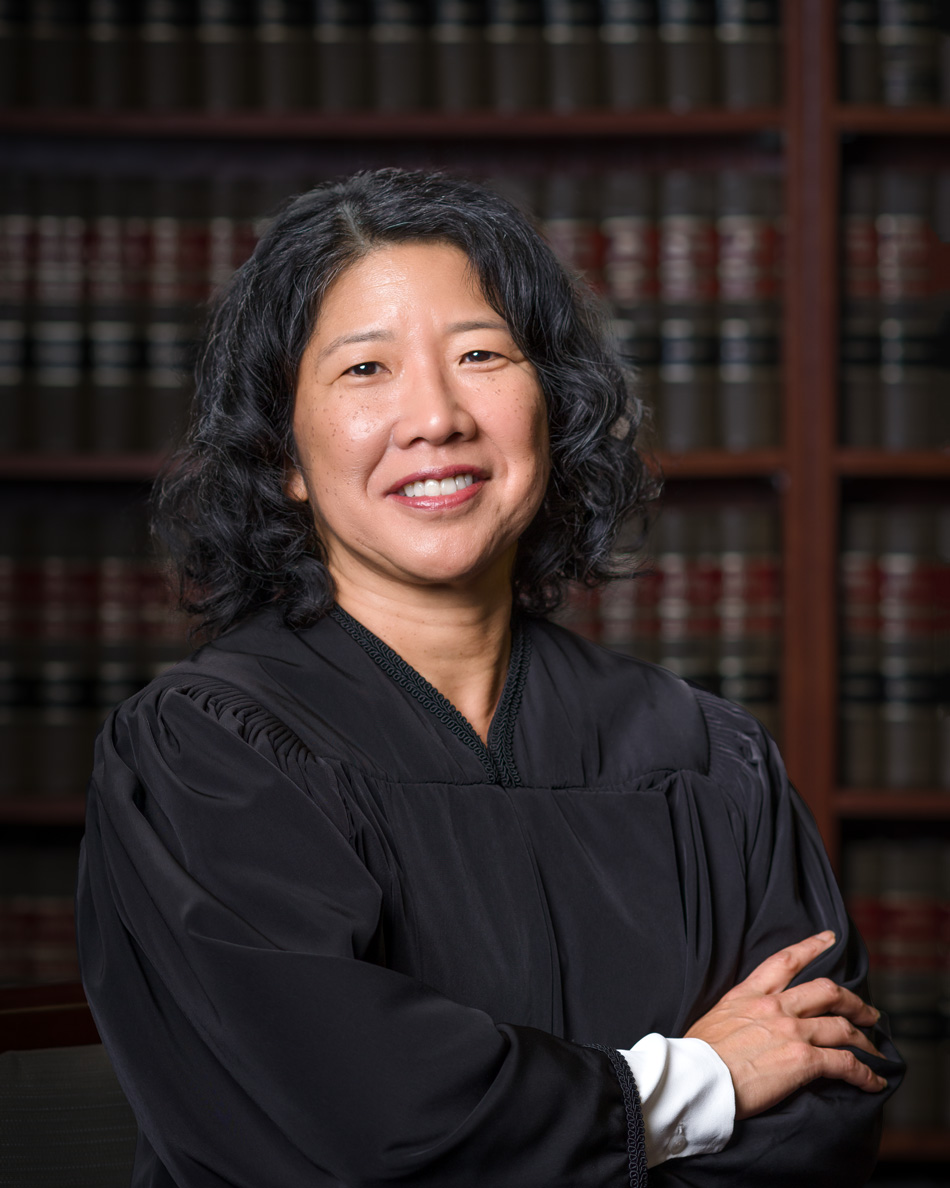

Judge of the United States District Court for the Northern District of California
- Incumbent
- Assumed office May 7, 2024
- Appointed by: Joe Biden
- Preceded by: William Orrick III

Judge of the Alameda County Superior Court
- In office December 7, 2018 – May 7, 2024
- Appointed by: Jerry Brown
- Preceded by: Alison M. Tucher
- Succeeded by: Thomas Eagle Weathers

Personal details
- Born: Eumi Kim Lee; 1972 (age 53–54) Madison, Wisconsin, U.S.
- Party: Democratic
- Education: Pomona College (BA); Georgetown University (JD)

Eumi Kim Lee (born 1972) is an American lawyer who has served as a United States district judge of the United States District Court for the Northern District of California since 2024. She previously served as a judge of the Alameda County Superior Court from 2018 to 2024.

== Education ==
Lee received a Bachelor of Arts from Pomona College in 1994 and a Juris Doctor from Georgetown University Law Center, cum laude, in 1999.

== Career ==
From 1999 to 2000, Lee served as a law clerk for Judge Jerome Turner of the United States District Court for the Western District of Tennessee. From 2000 to 2001, she was an associate at Keker, Van Nest & Peters LLP in San Francisco. From 2001 to 2002, she served as a law clerk for Judge Warren J. Ferguson of the United States Court of Appeals for the Ninth Circuit. From 2002 to 2005, she was again an associate at the same law firm. From 2005 to 2018, she was a clinical professor of law at the University of California College of the Law, San Francisco (formerly the University of California, Hastings College of the Law). From 2006 to 2012, she was of counsel and a consultant at Gonzalez and Leigh and from 2009 to 2012, she was an ethics trainer for San Diego Gas & Electric, Southern California Gas Company and Southern California Edison. On December 7, 2018, Lee was appointed by California Governor Jerry Brown to serve as a judge of the Alameda County Superior Court, to fill the vacancy left by the elevation of Judge Alison M. Tucher to the California Courts of Appeal. She was the first Korean-American judge ever appointed to the Alameda County Superior Court.

=== Federal judicial service ===
On July 27, 2023, President Joe Biden nominated Lee to serve as a United States district judge of the United States District Court for the Northern District of California. President Biden nominated Lee to the seat vacated by Judge William Orrick III, who assumed senior status on May 17, 2023. On September 6, 2023, a hearing on her nomination was held before the Senate Judiciary Committee. During her confirmation hearing, Lee was questioned on a journal article she wrote regarding the treatment of transgender, illegal immigrant, and women prisoners in California. Lee responded that the article was a summary of remarks made during conference panel discussion and not her own opinions. On November 9, 2023, her nomination was reported out of committee by an 11–10 vote. On November 13, 2023, her nomination was returned to the Judiciary Committee because of issues regarding proxy voting in committee. On November 30, 2023, during the first committee vote, her nomination failed to be reported out of committee by an 10–0–9 vote with all committee Republicans in attendance not voting, along with Democratic Senator Chris Coons. In a second vote, her nomination was reported out of committee by an 11–10 party-line vote. On January 3, 2024, her nomination was returned to the president under Rule XXXI, Paragraph 6 of the United States Senate and she was renominated on January 8, 2024. On January 18, 2024, her nomination was reported out of committee by an 11–10 party-line vote. On March 20, 2024, the Senate invoked cloture on her nomination by a 50–49 vote, with Senator Joe Manchin voting against the motion. Later that day, her nomination was confirmed by a 50–49 vote, with Senator Manchin voting against confirmation. She received her judicial commission on May 7, 2024.

== Community involvement ==
Prior to her appointment to the bench, she was a member of the Bar Association of San Francisco. Lee is a Democrat.

== See also ==
- List of Asian American jurists
- List of first women lawyers and judges in California
- Joe Biden judicial appointment controversies

Legal offices
Preceded by William Orrick III	Judge of the United States District Court for the Northern District of California; 2024–present	Incumbent
