= San Francisco Department of Public Works corruption scandal =

San Francisco Public Works scandal

The San Francisco Public Works corruption scandal is an ongoing investigation by federal, state and local prosecutors and investigators into bribery and fraud involving employees and contractors working for San Francisco Public Works (SFPW), and particularly, the Department of Building Inspection (DBI). The investigation was first brought to the public's attention by the arrest in January 2020 of Mohammed Nuru, who was the Director of Public Works, by federal agents. The scandal involved multiple instances of corruption, including conflict of interest, bribery, and fraud within the DBI. The scandal was uncovered through audits, legal proceedings, and investigations by city authorities and federal prosecutors, ultimately leading to the exposure of widespread corruption within the department. As of August 2024, 28 former city employees, officials, contractors and others have been criminally charged.

== Mohammed Nuru ==
Nuru was first employed as a deputy director of the Department of Public Works in 2000 by then Mayor Willie Brown. He was promoted to Director of SFPW in 2011, by then interim Mayor Ed Lee. (Note: The San Francisco Department of Public Works was rebranded as San Francisco Public Works in 2014.) Nuru came under criticism for discrimination against African-American women working in the department. In a lawsuit against Nuru and the city, Toni Battle accused Nuru of firing her for retaliation against her work as an investigator of discrimination in SFPW. The case was settled before trial, with the city paying Battle $105,000. The City Attorney also accused Nuru of "...surviving a series of ethical scandals that include repeated instances of misappropriating public funds for personal uses."

=== San Francisco League of Urban Gardeners ===
From 1992 to 2001, Nuru was executive director of San Francisco League of Urban Gardeners (SLUG), a non-profit organization that provided job-training opportunities for low-income youth. In 2004, investigations conducted by the San Francisco city attorney and controller found that Nuru directed a $1 million contract to SLUG and had forced SLUG employees to campaign for Gavin Newsom, who was candidate for Mayor. This constituted illegal use of city funds for a political campaigns. SLUG also misappropriated over $130,000 of funds from city contracts and grants and failed to pay over $643,000 in payroll taxes. Although Nuru was not disciplined, SLUG was subsequently banned from obtaining city contracts. (Note: SLUG was dissolved in 2004.)

=== Arrest, guilty plea and sentencing ===
On January 27, 2020, Nuru and local restaurateur Nick Bovis were arrested and charged with honest services wire fraud by federal authorities. The charges against Nuru and Bovis involved a scheme to bribe a San Francisco airport commissioner with $5,000 in cash and free travel in the hope of securing a contract for Bovis to open a restaurant at the airport. The commissioner declined the cash bribe. Nuru was further charged with taking bribes—including travel, lodging and wine on a vacation to China—from a Chinese developer to expedite city inspections of the developer's projects. Nuru also used his influence as a city official to obtain a retail lease in the new transit center for Bovis and gave Bovis non-public details of upcoming city projects including new public toilets and homeless shelters. Nuru was also charged with accepting bribes from local contractors. Those bribes included free work on his vacation home and a tractor. Nuru had been previously arrested on January 21, 2020, and had agreed to cooperate with the investigation. However, he broke his promise to keep the investigation confidential and was charged with lying to the Federal Bureau of Investigation (FBI). Both Nuru and Bovis were each released on a $2 million bond.

Shortly after Nuru was charged, Mayor London Breed placed him on leave; Nuru subsequently resigned from his job. (Note: London Breed has never been charged with a crime. However, she admitted accepting a gift from Nuru and paid a $8,292 fine for violating San Francisco's ethics laws. Breed addressed her friendship with Nuru in a Medium post.)

Nuru pleaded guilty to the federal charges of honest services wire fraud in December 2021. In his plea agreement, he admitted to bribery and money laundering. The bribes included cash, trips, expensive wine, jewelry and other goods and services from Nick Bovis, Florence Kong (who owns a construction firm), and contractors Balmore Hernandez, William Gilmartin and Alan Varela. Bovis, Kong, Hernandez, Gilmartin and Varela all pleaded guilty to various federal charges. Nuru also admitted accepting bribes from the trash hauling company, Recology Nuru was defended by a team of attorneys led by Ismail Ramsey, who was subsequently appointed as U.S. Attorney for the Northern District of California by President Joe Biden.

In August 2022, Nuru was sentenced to 84 months in prison to be followed by three years of supervised release. The sentence was a compromise between the request of the prosecutors who asked for nine years in prison, and that of the defense attorneys who suggested three years, which were both lower than the federal sentencing guidelines. He will also forfeit his ranch, pay a fine of $35,000 and perform 100 hours of community service. In sentencing Nuru, Judge William Orrick criticized Nuru's actions, saying "You made the city's competitive bidding, permit processing and decision-making a farce" and likening Nuru to drug dealers and gang murderers.

After his conviction, Nuru lost his public pension of $7,600 per month. In 2026, Nuru was released to a residential reentry center in San Francisco.

== San Francisco employees and officials ==
=== Sandra Zuniga ===
Sandra Zuniga held two positions in SFPW: she was appointed as the director of the "Fix-It Team" by then Mayor Ed Lee and was subsequently appointed as Director of the Mayor's Office of Neighborhood Services by Mayor London Breed. While employed by the city, and while Nuru headed SFPW and at times was her immediate supervisor, Zuniga was romantically involved with Nuru from November 2008 until May 2020. Nuru was instrumental in getting Zuniga her jobs with the city, approved her salary increases and wrote her positive employment reviews. Zuniga had given Nuru a loan of $25,000 before one positive employment review and salary raise. She was fired when the relationship between them was exposed in a report by the city's attorney. In 2021, she pleaded guilty to federal charges of conspiracy to commit money laundering. According to her plea agreement, she admitted to laundering $26,000 that had been paid to Nuru as bribes. She used those funds to pay for work on Nuru's vacation home and for a vacation trip for both of them to South America. Zuniga was sentenced to three years probation and agreed to cooperate with the federal prosecutors. Contributions that Zuniga had made to the San Francisco Employees' Retirement System were returned to her after she pleaded guilty.

=== Bernard Curran ===
Bernie Curran, a former San Francisco building inspector, pleaded guilty to one count of felony perjury and one count of misdemeanor financial wrongdoing, including accepting a $180,000 loan and concealing gifts from developers and contractors. He was sentenced to a year and a day in federal prison. Curran was also sentenced to two years in state prison after he pleaded guilty to concealing monetary payments and violating California conflict of interest laws. He will serve the state and federal sentences concurrently. Additionally, he approved work on his family's property and intervened in the inspection process, raising concerns about potential impropriety. Curran lost his public pension of $4,500 per month after he pleaded guilty.

=== Harlan Kelly ===
Harlan Kelly, a former general manager of the San Francisco Public Utilities Commission (PUC), was found guilty of multiple charges. A federal jury convicted Kelly of six out of eight charges, including conspiracy, bank fraud, and honest services wire fraud. Kelly accepted bribes from Walter Wong in exchange for influencing the public bidding process and steering contract awards, and lied to a lender to acquire a $1.3 million loan. Kelly had access to confidential information about city contract bidding processes and the ability to influence the awarding of a portion of city contracts. Kelly was sentenced to four years in jail, to be followed by three years probation. He was also ordered to complete treatment for drug use. During sentencing, Judge Richard Seeborg admonished Kelly, saying: "Mr. Kelly participated in very serious criminal conduct. He betrayed the public trust and made a mockery of his oath to serve the public." After he was convicted, Kelly was stripped of his city pension of $22,500 per month. Kelly is appealing his conviction.

=== Cyril Yu and Rodolfo Pada ===
Cyril Yu and Rodolfo Pada, former construction building plan engineers employed by the San Francisco DBI, were charged with one count each of conspiracy to commit honest services wire fraud for accepting bribes in exchange for expediting and approving building and construction plan permits. Pada was charged with accepting bribes, including an interest-free $85,000 loan from Freydoon Ghassemzadeh, a construction planning and design firm executive, and concealing the loan by having the funds provided by a relative of Ghassemzadeh. Yu was charged with taking bribes, including cash, meals, and drinks, from Ghassemzadeh and his associates in return for expediting and approving permits. Both Yu and Pada initially pleaded not guilty to all charges., but both eventually pleaded guilty. Yu subsequently was sentenced to one year and a day in prison and fined $20,000. During sentencing, Senior District Judge Susan Illston said: "...this is public corruption. It undermines the public confidence in our government, and it undermines the quality of the government services that are provided." Pada was sentenced to a year and a day in federal prison.

=== Gerald Sanguinetti ===
Gerald "Jerry" Sanguinetti, a former bureau manager for San Francisco's Public Works Department, faced charges related to concealing his ties to SDL Merchandising, a company owned by his wife, that did business with Public Works. He was charged by San Francisco District Attorney Chesa Boudin with five felony counts of perjury and two misdemeanor counts of failing to file financial disclosure statements. Prosecutors alleged that between 2013 and 2019, Sanguinetti failed to disclose over a quarter million dollars in income from SDL Merchandising, which received payments from Public Works employees through sub-accounts of the local non-profit organization San Francisco Parks Alliance for the purchase of custom-made items, including t-shirts and baseball caps. Despite the influx of money, Sanguinetti did not disclose this income and falsely stated on financial disclosures that he had no reportable interests. The relationship between Nuru, DPW and the Parks Alliance was described in detail in a report by San Francisco controller, who characterized the relationship as "pay-to-play". (Note: The relationship between SFPW and the Parks Alliance was further investigated by the Board of Supervisors Budget and Legislative Analyst.)

=== Tom Hui ===
Tom Hui was hired as an engineer at DBI in 1989, became acting director in 2012 and was appointed to the position full-time in 2013 by then Mayor Ed Lee.

A 2014 confidential city report had outlined corruption and malfeasance issues with Hui's leadership at DBI, but the president of the Building Inspection Commission at the time, Mel Murphy, took no action despite being made aware of the report's findings. In 2020, then City Attorney Dennis Herrera's investigation into Nuru's misconduct uncovered evidence that Hui, referred to as "DBI Official 1" in the FBI's complaint against Nuru, likely committed ethical and legal violations himself. Hui was accused by Herrera of accepting bribes in the form of gifts, meals, and personal favors from billionaire developer Zhang Li and his associates involved with the 555 Fulton project, in exchange for giving them preferential treatment at DBI. As early as 2008, Hui allegedly gave permit expediter Walter Wong, who worked closely with Nuru, "unprecedented access" to DBI operations in exchange for personal favors like helping Hui's son and his girlfriend get jobs at City Hall.

Hui was placed on leave by Mayor London Breed in March 2020 pending his removal by the Building Inspection Commission, after Herrera's report concluded he likely committed ethical and legal violations. Hui resigned shortly thereafter.

Although Hui was not directly charged by federal prosecutors, the City Attorney's investigation into Nuru's activities revealed Hui's own alleged unethical conduct and close ties to the key players in the Nuru scandal. Hui was described as being "recalcitrant to participate in the investigation" and had retained a criminal defense attorney.

== Developers, permit expediters and commissioners ==
=== Nick Bovis ===
Nick Bovis was the owner of the San Francisco restaurant, Lefty O'Douls (Note: Lefty O'Douls closed in 2017 for reasons unrelated to the SFPW scandal.) and also ran a charitable non-profit organization, Lefty O'Doul's Foundation for Kids, with a purported goal "...to provide underprivileged kids the opportunity to experience baseball through providing bats, baseball gloves, equipment and tickets to ball games." To further its charitable operations, the foundation received thousands of dollars in donations from contractors doing business with SFPW. However, in 2017, under the direction of Nuru, some of those funds were used to pay for a holiday party for SFPW employees. As a result of the allegations included in the federal complaint against Nuru and Bovis, the San Francisco City Attorney launched a separate investigation and subpoenaed five companies, asking for documents relating to donations to Lefty O'Doul's Foundation for Kids, and two other non-profit organizations: San Francisco Parks Alliance and San Francisco Clean City Coalition.

In 2020, Bovis pleaded guilty to honest services wire fraud for attempting to bribe the airport commissioner. He also pleaded guilty to wire fraud for illegally claiming an insurance payout after a restaurant fire. The plea included stipulation that Bovis cooperate with the ongoing federal investigation. He was ultimately sentenced to nine months in prison, one year of supervised release and a $100,000 fine.

In 2021, Mayor London Breed paid a $12,000 fine for violation of campaign finance laws for failing to record excessive donations from Bovis and another restaurateur.

In March 2025, US District Judge William H. Orrick authorized Bovis' early release to complete his sentence under home confinement. Bovis' attorneys had made the request because the Bureau of Prisons at FCI Florence had failed to provide Bovis with adequate medical care. Orrick said Bovis' treatment was "incomprehensible and very far below the standards that I expect for anyone held in custody."

=== Florence Kong ===
Florence Kong was a millionaire businesswoman who owned two companies that held contracts with SFPW: a construction company (Kwan Wo Ironworks) and a construction debris recycling company (SFR Recovery Inc.) In 2020, she was indicted by federal prosecutors on charges of bribery and lying to investigators. The bribery charges involved giving Nuru a gold Rolex watch worth approximately $36,550 and working on his vacation home. In exchange for the bribe, Nuru directed official city contracts to Kong's companies. Kong eventually pleaded guilty to both charges, and was sentenced to a year and a day in prison and a $95,000 fine. (Note: Kong was released from prison in January 2022.) The city contract with SFR recovery was canceled after Kong pleaded guilty. Kong subsequently agreed to repay San Francisco $640,500 and pay an ethics fine of $109,500. She also agreed that she, and two of her companies, SFR Recovery and Kin Wo Construction, would be banned from city contracts until 2026.

=== Zhang Li ===
Zhang Li, (Note: In this Chinese name, the family name is Zhang.) a Chinese billionaire real estate businessman, is the founder and CEO of Z&L Properties, a real estate development company with international reach. Z&L Properties owns a portfolio of projects across China, the United States, and other countries. Zhang orchestrated a series of bribes to gain Nuru's favor and accelerate approval of his luxury development project at 555 Fulton Street. The bribes included accommodations, meals, and a trip to China for Nuru, all meant to influence his decisions on the development. Zhang was arrested in London, England and released to monitored home detention on bail of £15,000,000. Zhang initially fought extradition from England but was eventually returned to the U.S. and agreed to a deferred prosecution agreement in July 2023. He admitted to bribing Nuru and agreed to a $50,000 fine, while Z&L Properties was fined $1 million and admitted to conspiracy charges.

=== Rodrigo Santos ===
Rodrigo Santos was a structural engineer and former president of the city's Building Inspection Commission. He pleaded guilty to multiple charges, including bank fraud, honest services fraud, evading taxes, and admitting to stealing $775,000 from his clients. Santos was sentenced to 30 months in prison and three years of supervised release. He was also ordered to pay the city nearly $122,000 for the costs of an audit related to the corruption scandal. In 2025, Santos settled a lawsuit with the city by agreeing to pay $1.425 million. He was also barred from holding an engineering license for five years.

=== Wing Lok "Walter" Wong ===
Wing Lok "Walter" Wong, the owner of W. Wong Construction Co. and other companies, was a permit expediter who pleaded guilty to federal charges of conspiring to commit fraud and money laundering. Wong's involvement included coordinating corrupt activities and conspiring with city officials to influence work on development projects, obtain city contracts through bribery, and commit fraud. As part of the settlement with the city, Wong and his companies agreed to pay $1.45 million for problematic contracts, as well as an additional $318,000 in ethics fines and fees. His role as a connecting thread between separate misconduct by department heads at Public Works, the Department of Building Inspection, and the Public Utilities Commission was a key focus of the investigation.

=== SIA Consulting ===
Three executives of the San Francisco design and engineering firm SIA Consulting were charged with one count each of conspiracy to commit honest services wire fraud. Prosecutors alleged that Sia Tahbazof, Reza Koshnevisan and Bahman Ghassemzadeh bribed three employees of San Francisco DBI — Rodolfo Pada, Cyril Yu and Bernie Curran — in exchange for expedited building permits and approval of building inspections. In addition to paying the DBI employees cash bribes, Tahbazof gave Pada an interest-free $85,000 loan and forgave Curran part of an interest-free loan of $260,000. Although originally professing their innocence, all three subsequently pleaded guilty and were sentenced to three years probation each. Tahbazof was fined $75,000; Koshnevisan and Ghassemzadeh were fined $25,000 each.

The loan from Sia Tahbazof to Curran was facilitated by Tahbazof's son, Yosef Tahbazof, a real estate attorney.. Although never charged with a crime, Yosef Tahbazof resigned from his position on the San Francisco Assessment Appeals Board after pressure from the President of the Board of Supervisors, Aaron Peskin. In the wake of his resignation, the San Francisco Assessor-Recorder, City Attorney and Clerk of the Board of Supervisors all announced separate investigations into Yosef Tahbazoh's voting record on the Assessment Appeals Board.

=== Alan Varela, William Gilmartin and Balmore Hernandez ===
Alan Varela, William Gilmartin and Balmore Hernandez collaborated in a conspiracy to bribe Nuru to secure favorable treatment for their business interests. Varela was the founder and president of ProVen Management Inc., and Gilmartin was a construction executive at the same company. Hernandez was former CEO of Azul Works Inc. ProVen Management Inc. and Azul Works Inc. are general engineering contractors based in the Bay Area. They bribed Nuru with expensive dinners and $25,000 cash payments to influence the selection of their proposal to build an asphalt recycling plant on Port of San Francisco land. The bribes included a $40,000 John Deere tractor for Nuru's ranch. Hernandez also provided more than $250,000 worth of work, labor, and materials to build a vacation home on Nuru's ranch. Varela and Gilmartin each pleaded guilty to one count of conspiracy to commit honest services wire fraud and Hernandez pleaded guilty to one count of conspiring to commit fraud. Varela was sentenced to 24 months in prison and fined $127,000, Gilmartin was sentenced to eight months in prison and fined $100,000 for his role in the conspiracy, and Hernandez received a six-month sentence and a $100,000 fine.

After the extent of the bribery was exposed by the federal investigation, the San Francisco city attorney moved to bar Varela, Gilmartin and Hernandez from receiving contracts from the city for up to five years. ProVen Management Inc., Azul Works Inc. and four companies associated with Proven Management Inc. were also debarred from receiving contracts for public works.

=== Victor Makras ===
Victor Makras, a real estate broker and investor based in San Francisco, and a former member of a number of city commissions, was charged with bank fraud and conspiracy to commit bank fraud. The charges claimed that Makras conspired with Harlan Kelly to defraud Quicken Loans by overstating Kelly's mortgage and understating Kelly's amount of other debts. Makras was found guilty and sentenced to three years probation and a fine of $15,200. The San Francisco Ethics Commission found that Makras' conspiracy with Kelly was sufficient evidence to conclude there was probable cause that Makras had violated provisions of the San Francisco Campaign and Governmental Conduct Code (SF C&GCC). The Ethics Commission subsequently fined Makras $14,000 for violations of SF C&GCC in relation to the loan to Kelly and other conflicts of interest.

=== Ken Hong Wong ===
Former parole officer Ken Hong Wong was part of a plot to bribe Nuru $20,000 to get an engineering graduate a job in the city so she could remain in the country. The father of the engineer gave Wong $10,000 in exchange for helping to arrange the bribe. Wong was given a six-month prison sentence after entering a guilty plea to conspiracy and bribery. During sentencing U.S. District Court Judge William Orrick said: "It's one of the sleaziest and lowest things that somebody can do. It reflects the worst of what citizens think happens in public jobs."

== Recology ==
Recology, Inc. is an umbrella company that holds contracts with San Francisco and other San Francisco bay area counties and cities for collection of trash, recycling and composting. In San Francisco, Recology's contract is a monopoly that originated from a voter-approved ordinance in 1932. In September 2021, three subsidiaries of Recology were charged by the federal prosecutors with conspiracy to commit honest services fraud. As part of the companies' plea agreement, they agreed to pay a fine of $36 million and to cooperate with ongoing investigation. The charges against the three subsidiaries alleged that the companies had conspired to bribe Nuru. They admitted to paying $150,000 per year to charities controlled by Nuru and $60,000 per year to pay for a SFPW staff holiday party through a charity controlled by Bovis.

The bribes from Recology to Nuru were arranged by two former employees who were charged in the scandal. Paul Giusti, a former community relations manager was charged with bribery and money laundering. The complaint by U.S. attorneys alleged that Nuru arranged to illegally increase trash hauling fees paid by San Francisco's residents and businesses. Giusti also found a job for Nuru's son at a non-profit organization. Giusti eventually pleaded guilty to bribery and honest services fraud, and was sentenced to three years probation, including six months of home detention, a $30,000 fine and 300 hours of community service.

The second former Recology employee to be charged in the investigation was John Porter, who was a vice president and general manager of Recology's San Francisco Group. Porter was charged with bribery and money laundering. The complaint against Porter alleged that he approved many of the bribes made by Recology to Nuru. Porter pleaded guilty to conspiracy to commit honest services wire and mail fraud and was sentenced to six months of home incarceration, a $30,000 fine and community service. As part of the plea deal, other charges against Porter were dropped.

During their respective court appearances for sentencing, both Porter and Giusti implied that senior executives were aware of the bribery scheme, although no other Recology employees have been charged.

Based on the allegations included in the federal charges against Recology and two of its former senior executives, the San Francisco city attorney and controller launched investigations into unjustified rate increases and into the rate setting process in general. Although Recology had previously informed Nuru of the unjustified rate increases, he took no action and allowed the increases to stand. In settling a lawsuit filed by the city attorney on behalf of the state and city, Recology agreed to refund the overcharges to San Francisco customers, reduce future trash-hauling rates, and pay a civil penalty of $7 million to the city. The review of the rate setting process by the city controller discovered a further unjustified profit by Recology. As part of the settlement of that investigation, Recology agreed to deposit $25 million into a fund to offset future rate increases.

In June 2022, Mayor London Breed and all San Francisco supervisors supported a ballot measure to overhaul the oversight and process of setting trashing collection rates. The measure proposed moving the responsibility of rate setting from San Francisco Public Works to the City Controller and would allow the Board of Supervisors to amend the rate setting process without asking voters. The measure was approved by voters with 71% in favor. In October 2024, the Refuse Rate Board, that was created by the ballot measure, identified an additional $24 million overcharge by Recology, resulting in a refund to customers.

In October 2024, in a filing to the United States District Court for the Northern District of California, the United States Department of Justice (DOJ) indicated that Recology's San Francisco subsidiaries had fulfilled the terms of a deferred prosecution agreement (DPA) related to the bribery scandal. The DOJ sought to dismiss a conspiracy charge against the SF Recology Group, pending approval from Judge William Orrick. In response to the scandal, Recology made significant changes in leadership and implemented a robust compliance program. The company also prohibited political contributions from its leadership to San Francisco officials and submitted annual reports detailing its compliance measures. As a result of the DOJ filing, Judge Orrick dismissed the pending bribery charge against Recology after determining that the company met the terms of the DPA. However, the judge expressed skepticism about the extent of corruption within Recology, suggesting that it may have involved higher-level executives beyond those already charged.

In March 2025 United States District Judge Haywood Gilliam dismissed a civil class action suit filed against Recology that alleged bribery and fraud by Recology and sought restitution and punitive damages. (Note: The civil suit was Villarroel et al v. Recology Inc. et al. Case Number 4:2024cv03266 in the US District Court for the Northern District of California. The case was removed from the San Francisco County Superior Court to the federal court system in May 2024.)

== Aftermath ==
=== City audit and required repairs ===
After the corruption had been uncovered, DBI completed a review of work on 5,445 buildings that were associated with Santos or Curran to determine the extent of a number of violations, including unpermitted work and missing inspections. The auditors identified 277 properties that required repairs to bring them in compliance with building codes, at the expense of the current owners. In July 2025, the San Francisco Board of Supervisors passed legislation providing amnesty to owners who had purchased their property without knowledge of Santos's or Curran's involvement.

=== March 2024 Proposition D ===
After a years-long review of San Francisco government ethics law in response to the ongoing corruption scandal, the San Francisco Ethics Commission unanimously voted to place Proposition D on the March 2024 ballot. Proposition D will amend the city's Campaign and Governmental Conduct Code to bolster transparency and accountability in within San Francisco's governance structure. This proposition proposes several changes to city law, such as clarifying and expanding the restricted source rule, establishing standardized disclosure requirements for payments to City departments, extending ethics training mandates, standardizing rules regarding incompatible activities, and broadening anti-bribery prohibitions. The Ethics Commission has already endorsed regulations pertaining to this proposition, with a focus on ethics training requirements and incompatible activities. The proposition seeks to address corruption loopholes, revamp conflict-of-interest regulations, and enforce additional ethics training for public officials. Notable provisions include expanding the scope of prohibited gifts for City officers and employees, revising the definition of bribery to encompass solicitation or acceptance of anything of value intended to influence government actions, compelling City department heads to furnish additional information on gifts received by their department, enabling monetary penalties for failure to disclose personal, professional, or business relationships as required, and mandating annual ethics training for all City employees vested with decision-making authority. This measure is crafted to enhance conflict-of-interest laws by imposing clearer restrictions on gifts to public officials and fostering greater transparency and accountability in governance.

The measure was passed by 89.2% voters in favor.

=== Further alleged corruption ===
The investigations by the FBI and the SF district attorney into the fraud and corruption scandal involving Nuru led to exposure of other alleged bribery schemes.

Lanita Henriquez, the former head of San Francisco's Community Challenge Grant Program, was charged with steering $1.4 million in city contracts to RDJ Enterprises, a consultancy firm led by former city employee Dwayne Jones. Jones, in turn, allegedly funneled around $190,000 back to Henriquez. To conceal the bribes, Henriquez reportedly had Jones pay her family and friends, who then funneled the money back to her. In return, Jones sent invoices for supposed work on community projects to Henriquez, masking the payments. Both Henriquez and Jones faced charges of misappropriation of public money, bribery, and financial conflict of interest allegations.

Stanley Ellicott, a former San Francisco Human Resources manager, was charged with aiding Jones in funneling bribes to Henriquez. Ellicott allegedly acted as an intermediary in this bribery scheme between the businessman and Henriquez, facilitating illicit payments between them.

Ellicott was later accused of invoicing the city for earthquake supplies but instead purchasing high-value tech items like virtual reality headsets, cameras, tablets, and more, which he then resold on eBay for personal profit. Ellicott faces 62 felony charges, including felony receipt of stolen property, grand theft, money laundering, and insurance fraud. His scheme involved embezzling over $627,000 of worker's compensation funds by setting up a fictitious company named Independent Auditors Group. Ellicott manipulated the city's workers' compensation system to funnel payments to this fake entity, which he controlled, and then redirected these funds into his personal checking account. In December 2025, Ellicott pleaded guilty to all charges against him, and was subsequently sentenced to three years in prison. The San Francisco District Attrorney was able to recover the stolen money.

In the wake of the exposure of the charges against Ellicott, the San Francisco Department of Human Resources, in conjunction with the city attorney and city controller implemented additional controls to prevent similar misuse of the system used to process worker's compensation-related payments.

Despite the indictment against Jones, a San Francisco Controller report found that two city departments, the Human Rights Commission and the Office of Economic and Workforce Development, had improperly continued conducting business with another charity founded by Jones, Urban Ed Academy (UEA). The report detailed numerous apparent irregularities in awarding grants and contracts to UEA.

The city subsequently rescinded over $14 million in grants to social services and arts non-profit organizations.

=== Ongoing corruption ===
In March 2025, a former San Francisco Department of Building Inspection inspector, Van Zeng, was found guilty of violating conflict-of-interest laws. Zeng approved permits for properties owned by his parents and his father's construction company, Mutual Seiko Construction, where he had worked before joining the DBI. This violates San Francisco's conflict-of-interest laws, which prevent employees from making decisions that personally benefit them or their previous employers.

=== San Francisco Inspector General ===
The Nuru scandal exposed flaws in the city's oversight procedures and highlighted the perceived inability of the Ethics Commission and the District Attorney's Office to adequately investigate and curtail corruption in city departments.

The president of the San Francisco Board of Supervisors and 2024 mayoral candidate, Aaron Peskin, proposed a new Inspector General (IG). The proposal established a centralized office tasked with looking into cases of fraud, waste, abuse, and misconduct within the city government and any businesses that do business with it, including nonprofits.

Key elements of the proposal include:

- subpoena power to compel cooperation from city employees and from government contractors and subcontractors (including not-for-profit organizations) receiving city funds.
- appointed by the mayor and confirmed by a two-thirds vote of the Board of Supervisors. The position would have a five-year term and could only be removed for cause.
- serve as a singular entity focused solely on investigating corruption, as opposed to the current system where multiple city offices handle corruption as part of broader missions.

In July 2024, the San Francisco Board of Supervisors placed the proposal on the November 2024 ballot for voter approval. The proposal passed 60.94% to 39.06%.

In October 2025, the San Francisco Controller announced that the first Inspector General had been hired: former Assistant U.S. Attorney for the Northern District of California, Alexandra Shepard. Shepard had been one of the attorneys involved in the prosecution of Nuru.

== See also ==
- San Francisco Parks Alliance—Financial scandals and closure
- San Francisco Human Rights Commission—Corruption scandal
