= Li Zhang (biologist) =

Biologist

Li Zhang is a biologist currently working at University of Texas at Dallas. She is a professor of Biological Sciences and the Cecil H. and Ida Green Distinguished Chair in Systems Biology Science at the University of Texas at Dallas. During her 20+ years of independent research, Li Zhang has made major contributions to the understanding of Heme signaling and function in gene regulation, neuronal differentiation and survival, and lung cancer bioenergetics.

== Professional Preparation ==
Zhang completed her B.S. in Chemistry at Zhongshan University in China. She then completed her Ph.D. in Biochemistry at the University of California in Los Angeles (UCLA) and did her postdoctoral studies at the Massachusetts Institute of Technology (MIT) Department of Biology. She has served as a faculty member at NYU School of Medicine and the Mailman School of Public Health at Columbia University. In 2007, Zhang joined the University of Texas at Dallas (UTD), as a professor of biological sciences in the School of Natural Sciences and Mathematics.

== Research Areas ==
Zhang's lab is interested in understanding the molecular mechanisms underlying Heme function and signaling in eukaryotic cells. Heme is central to oxygen sensing and utilization in virtually all living organisms. Professor Li Zhang's studies on the Hap1-heme system are a classical example of how heme acts to mediate cellular signaling and gene regulation. Recent work in her lab has demonstrated that elevated heme synthesis and uptake underpin intensified oxidative metabolism and tumorigenic functions in non-small-cell lung cancer cells. Furthermore, Zhang's lab is interested in investigating the role of heme in Alzheimer's Disease. Her lab combines approaches of molecular and cellular biology with genomics and computational approaches to elucidate the global molecular mechanisms underlying cellular responses to environmental stressors, including hypoxia and environmental toxicants.

Zhang has published a series of noted articles in the field of heme biology. Those include the following: Heme binds to a short sequence that serves as a regulatory function in diverse proteins; Heme promotes transcriptional and demethylase activities of Gis1, a member of the histone demethylase JMJD2/KDM4 family; Heme: A versatile signaling molecule controlling the activities of diverse regulators ranging from transcription factors to MAP kinases; Heme, an essential nutrient from dietary proteins, critically impacts diverse physiological and pathological processes; A holistic view of cancer bioenergetics: Mitochondrial function and respiration play fundamental roles in the development and progression of diverse tumors; Elevated heme synthesis and uptake underpin intensified oxidative metabolism and tumorigenic functions in non-small cell lung cancer cells.

Zhang edited and contributed to a book titled Heme Biology – the Secret Life of Heme in Regulating Diverse Biological Processes in 2011. The Second edition titled Heme biology: heme acts as a versatile signaling molecule regulating diverse biological processes released in 2020, details the myriad functions of heme and outlines the latest research about the molecule.
