= Zhang Li (entrepreneur) =

Chinese businessman (born 1952/1953)

- 张力
- Born: 1952 or 1953 (age 73–74); Guangzhou, Guangdong, China
- Occupations: Founder & president fuli group

Chinese name
- Traditional Chinese: 張力
- Simplified Chinese: 张力
Transcriptions
Standard Mandarin
- Hanyu Pinyin: Zhāng Lì

Zhang Li (Chinese: 张力; born 1952 or 1953), is a Chinese billionaire who is a co-founder of Guangzhou R&F Properties. He is president of Fuli Group (富力集团; 富力集團).

== Biography ==
Zhang is from Guangzhou, Guangdong, China.

Zhang at beginning was an industrial worker in a textile factory which he joined in 1973, later became an official serving in the local government.

In 1986, he became the chief manager of the Garden Village Hotel (Chinese: 花园村酒店). Two years later, he first entered the constructional industry, then developed his own business in the field of real estate. He has a long cooperation with the Hong Kong-based businessman LI Silian (Chinese: 李思廉).

In 2002, Zhang first invested in Beijing, with 3.2 billion Chinese Yuan. He mainly invested in real estate in Beijing, to fit the demands of the Beijing 2008 Olympic Games.

As of 8 April 2023, Forbes reported Zhang's net worth as US$1.8 billion.

In December 2023, Zhang resigned from his positions of CEO and board member of R&F properties.

=== Bribery charges and plea deal ===
On November 30, 2022, Zhang was arrested in London, England, on charges of bribing convicted felon Mohammed Nuru in San Francisco. Zhang was released on bail of £15,000,000. As of 14 December 2022, Zhang was confined to a "5-bedroom penthouse apartment on the 43rd floor of an R&F-owned tower." In July 2023, Zhang returned to San Francisco and admitted bribing Nuru in order to fast-track one of his projects in the city. Zhang plied Nuru with meals, gifts, hotel stays, and other benefits in exchange for Nuru's help in securing favorable treatment for the project. Zhang agreed to pay a $50,000 fine and admit his bribes and other corrupt acts as part of a plea deal with prosecutors. If he abides by the terms of the deal, the charges against him will be dropped in three years. As part of Zhang's plea deal, his company, Z&L Properties, was fined $1 million.
