= San Francisco Department of Public Works =

San Francisco Public Works
Agency overview
- Formed: January 8, 1900; 126 years ago
- Jurisdiction: City and County of San Francisco
- Headquarters: 1 Dr. Carlton B. Goodlett Place, San Francisco, CA 94102
- Employees: 1,200
- Annual budget: $453.2 million
- Agency executive: Carla Short, Director
- Parent agency: Office of the City Administrator
- Website: sfpublicworks.org

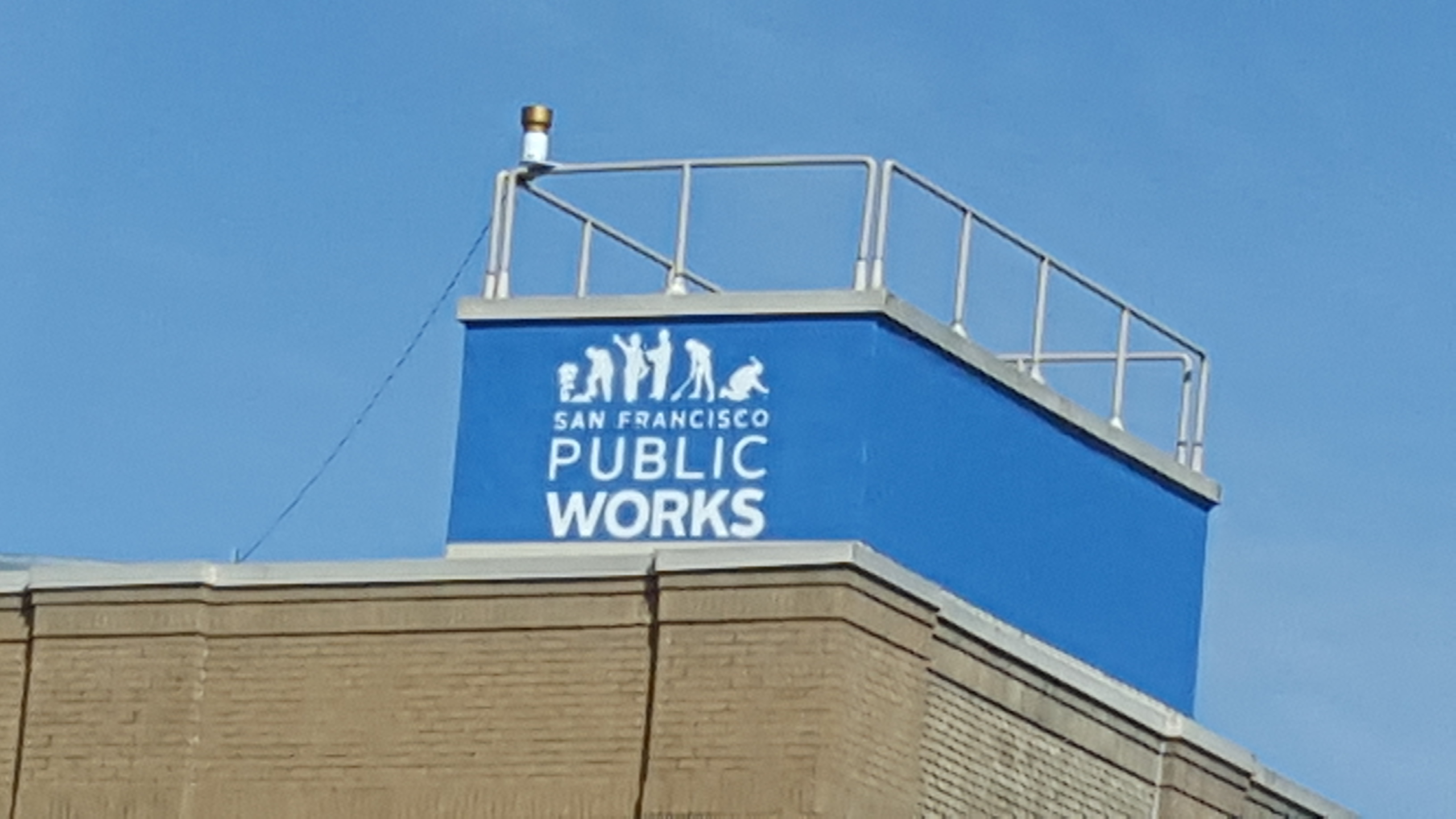
Logo of San Francisco Public Works on the top of a building in San Francisco.

San Francisco Public Works (SFPW) is a governmental agency for the City and County of San Francisco in California. They are responsible for the care and maintenance of San Francisco’s streets and infrastructure. The department designs, builds, resurfaces and cleans streets; plants and maintains trees; designs, constructs and maintains city-owned facilities; designs combined sewers owned by San Francisco Public Utilities Commission; designs drainage facilities; conducts sidewalk and roadway inspections, constructs curb ramps, provides mechanical and manual street cleaning, removes graffiti from public property; and partners with the diverse neighborhoods in San Francisco. Public Works serves San Francisco residents, merchants and visitors 24 hours a day and seven days a week with a workforce of approximately 1,200 employees, as of 2009.

== History ==
San Francisco Public Works was officially created on January 8, 1900 with the name of Board of Public Works. Its first task was to organize and regulate street construction and paving projects throughout the city. The original four bureaus were: Streets, Lighting, Building, and Light & Water Services. Over the next century and nearly two decades later, the roles have shifted and expanded dramatically.

In 2014, after a year-long rebranding process, the department switched its name from the San Francisco Department of Public Works, or DPW, to San Francisco Public Works. The operating budget for Fiscal Year 2015-16 was approximately $256 million.

Mohammed Nuru, the Director of the Department, was arrested by the FBI in January 2020 under charges of "corruption, bribery kickbacks and side deals". Having previously been "placed on leave and removed from all decision-making since the arrest", Nuru resigned on February 10, 2020, as announced by Mayor London Breed."

== Accomplishments ==
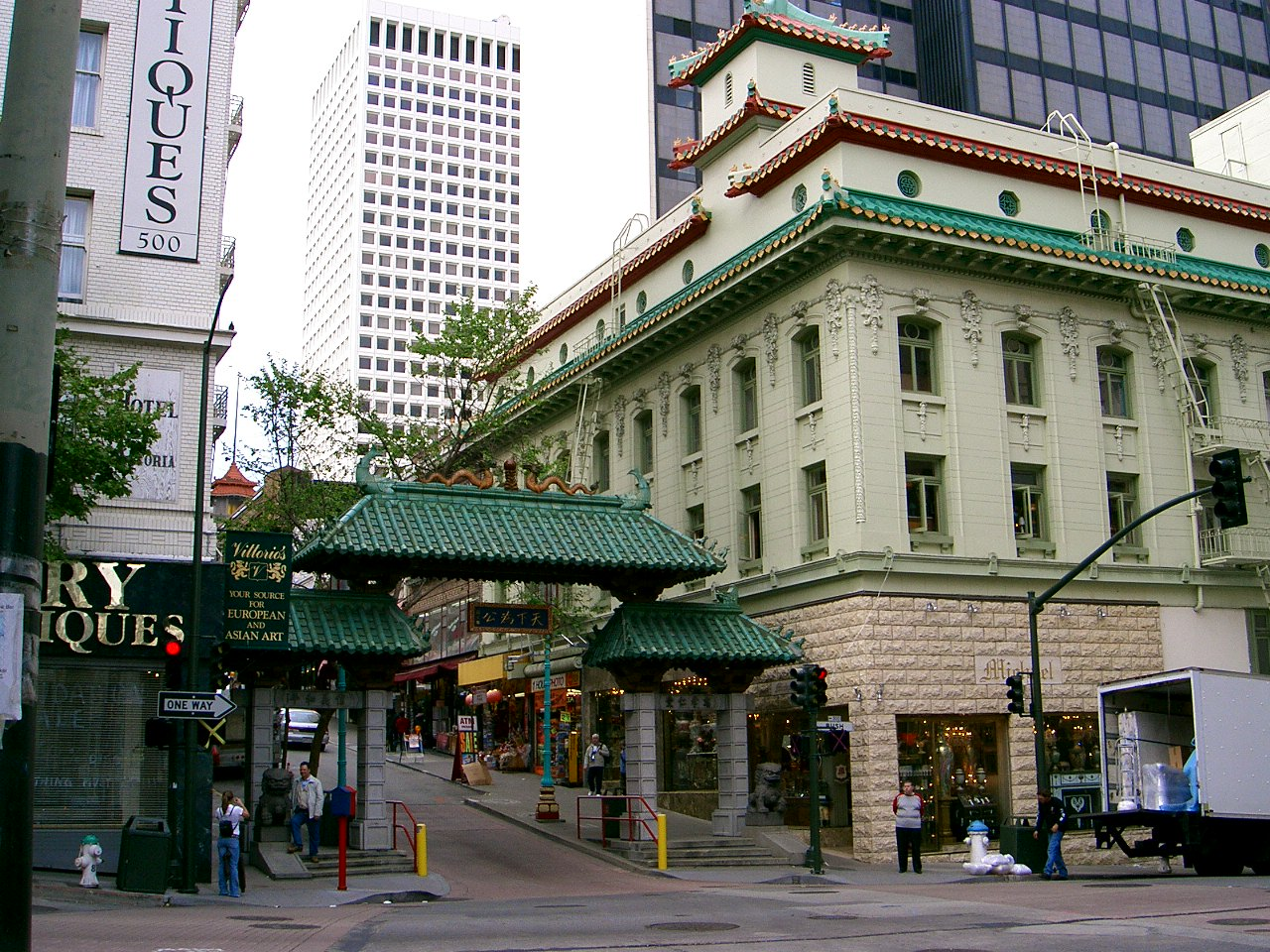
Gateway Arch (or Dragon Gate) in Chinatown, San Francisco

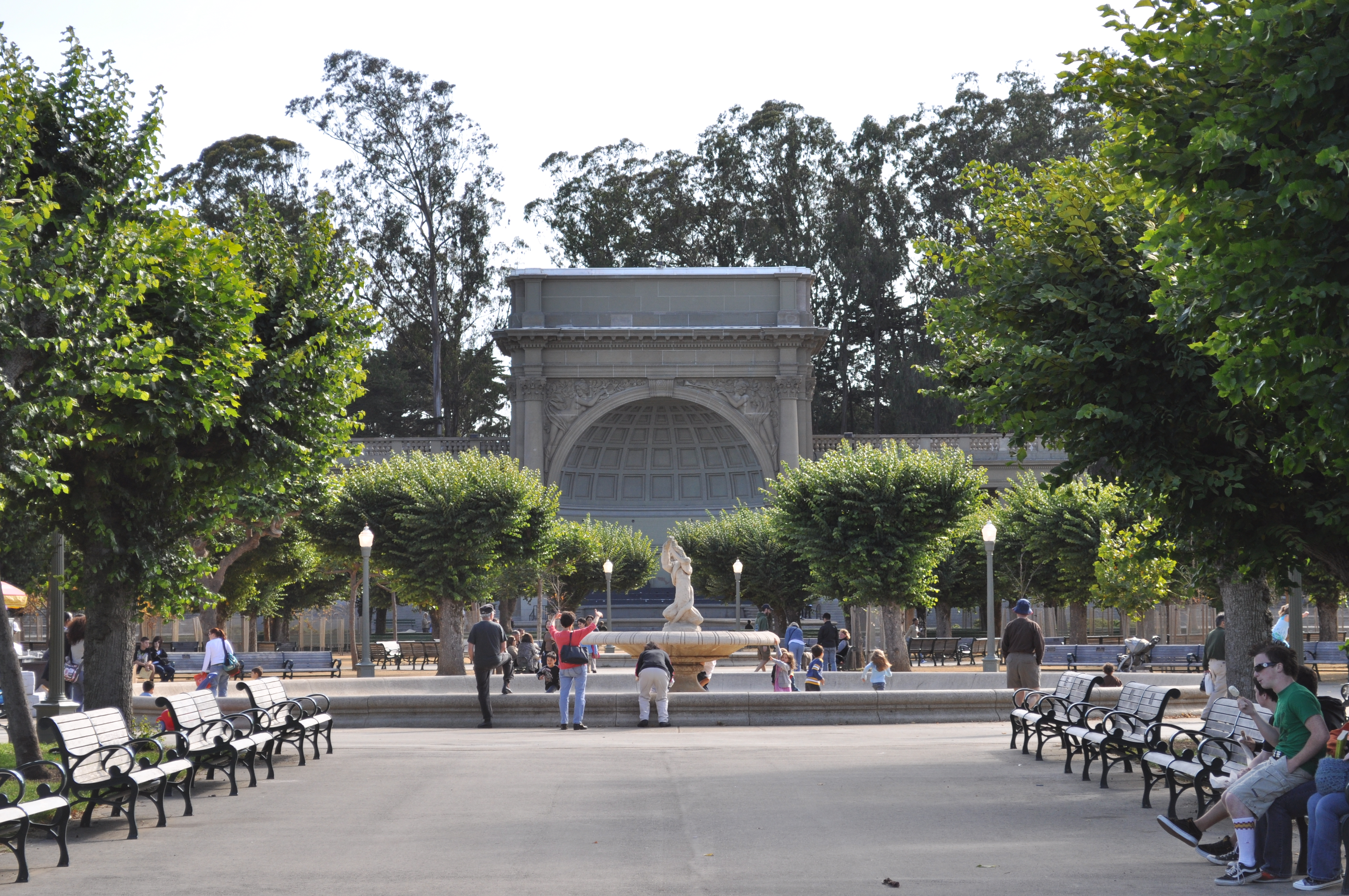
Music Concourse in Golden Gate Park

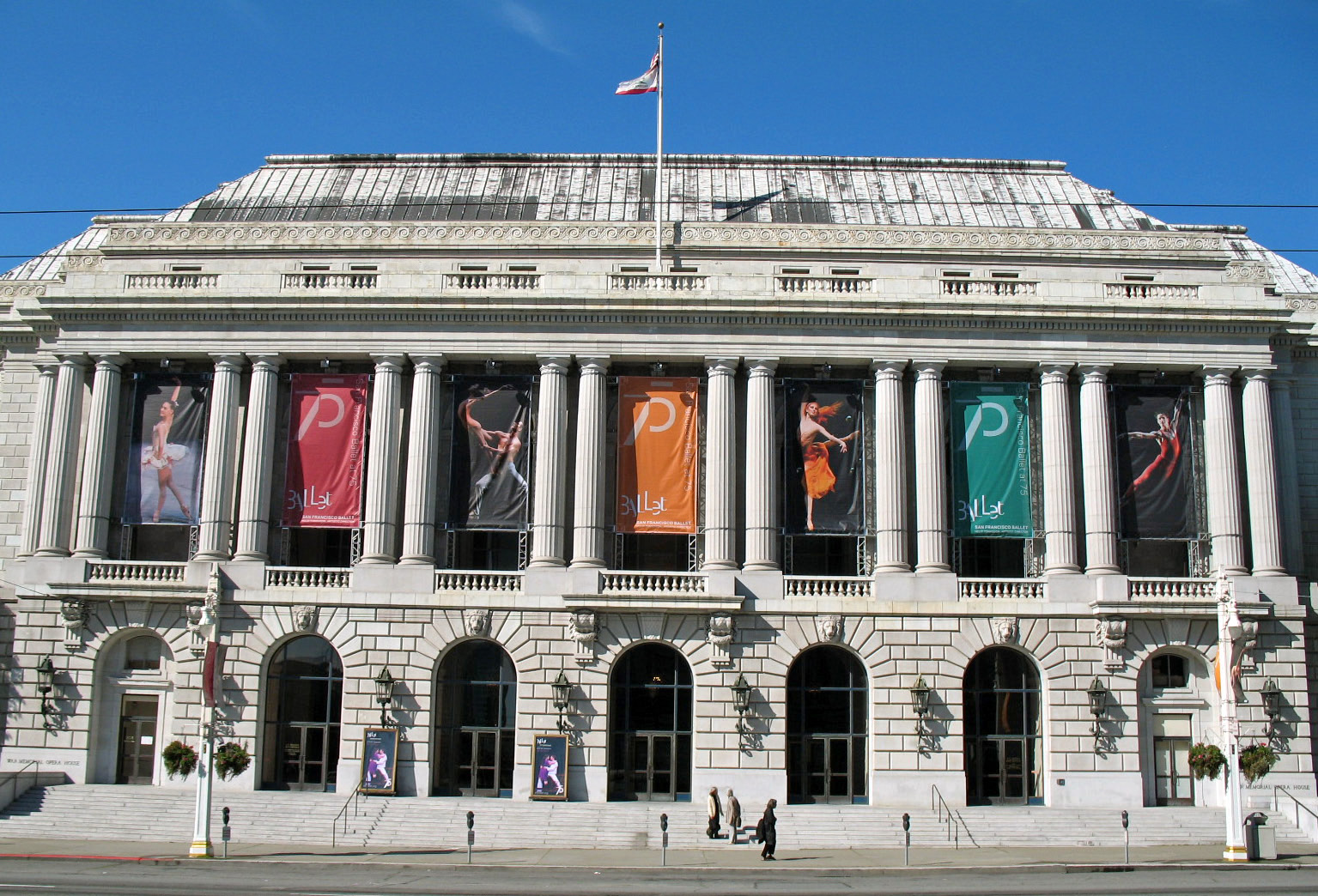
War Memorial Opera House

1969

- The Gateway Arch (or Dragon Gate) to Chinatown, San Francisco was completed in September at a project cost of $76,790.
- DPW Annual Report dubbed the increase in litter as “a modern phenomenon”, blaming it on “unsolicited advertising leaflets, handbills and so-called newspapers for which no charge is made…paper and plastic in the form of product containers or wrappings.”

1974

- DPW implemented the Controlled Parking Program, which enacted scheduled parking prohibitions on streets during certain hours to clear the way for mechanical street sweepers. It began as a pilot program in the Richmond District. The Board of Supervisors approved $56,700 for 2,200 signs to be posted throughout the neighborhoods. The program eventually expanded to a new district each year after.

1976

- San Francisco General Hospital Medical Center opens. This $30 million construction project was awarded in 1971. After many construction difficulties the medical facility eventually opens.

1980

- Bureau of Engineering completes a $726,382 contract to develop and rehabilitate the music concourse in Golden Gate Park.
- Clean Water Program begins. The CWP was responsible for the design and construction of the largest capital improvement program ever undertaken at the time, which was to bring the City's sewerage system into compliance with State and Federal water pollution control laws, such as the Clean Water Act. Miles of tunnels, storage systems, sewers, pump stations were successfully completed to improve the receiving water quality including beaches and the Bay front by significantly reducing combined sewage overflows. The estimated costs at the time were $800 million by 1985. Many other wastewater agencies in the nation are still carrying out such programs today.

1988

- Voters pass $27 million Street Improvement Bond Issue to improve streets, sidewalks, and traffic signals.

1989

- Within 72 hours of the October 17th Loma Prieta earthquake, DPW performed 1,600 building inspections. In all that year, over 15,000 inspections were made, classifying buildings Red (unsafe), Yellow (limited entry), and Green (safe).

1994

- The graffiti abatement program begins with two painters from the Bureau of Building repair and ten young people form the Mayor's Youth Worker Program.

1997

- $70.5 million Civic Center Courthouse for the San Francisco Superior and Municipal Civil Courts is completed.

1998

- The $56 million War Memorial Opera House Seismic Upgrade and Improvement Project construction was completed.

1999

- $220 million San Francisco City Hall Seismic Upgrade project was completed.

2015

- $243 million San Francisco's new Police Department Headquarters and public safety campus was completed.

== See also ==
San Francisco Department of Public Works corruption scandal
