= Mohammed Nuru =

American former civil servant

- Born: November 15, 1962 (age 63); England, United Kingdom
- Education: Kansas State University
- Employer(s): City and County of San Francisco
- Criminal charges: Honest services fraud
- Criminal penalty: 84 months in federal prison
- Criminal status: Incarcerated

Mohammed Nuru (born November 15, 1962, England) is an American former civil servant and convicted criminal. He was formerly the Director of the San Francisco Department of Public Works from 2011 until 2020 where he was involved in a corruption scandal. He was convicted of honest services fraud and sentenced to 7 years in prison.

== Personal life ==
Nuru was born in the United Kingdom and raised on a farm in Nigeria. In 1983, he immigrated to the United States to study landscape architecture at Kansas State University.

Nuru and San Francisco mayor London Breed dated. Following the corruption scandal, Breed acknowledged having accepted gifts from Nuru during her tenure as Mayor and was fined $8,292 for the ethics violation. The gift involved Nuru paying for repairs to Breed's car.

== Career ==
In 2011 Nuru became the director of the San Francisco Department of Public Works. During his time as director he worked to improve street sanitation and oversaw drastic changes to the Market Street corridor. Addressing homelessness was a major concern during his time as Director; however Nuru diverted homelessness alleviation funds to his friends.

Nuru was instrumental in adopting the use of liquid repellent paint on city infrastructure to discourage public urination.

He was the chairman of the board of directors at the Transbay Joint Powers Authority.

== Corruption scandal ==
Nuru was arrested by the FBI in January 2020 under charges of "corruption, bribery kickbacks and side deals".

Having previously been "placed on leave and removed from all decision-making since the arrest", Nuru resigned on February 10, 2020, as announced by Mayor Breed."

In June 2021 Nuru was arrested for brandishing a knife at the San Francisco-Marin Food Bank in Dogpatch in a case unconnected to the alleged bribery. Nuru underwent a court ordered psychiatric evaluation and no charges resulted from the arrest.

In January 2022 Nuru pled guilty to one count of fraud in exchange for a plea bargain. Nuru was subsequently sentenced to 84 months (7 years) in federal prison. After he was sentenced, Nuru was stripped of his city pension of $7,600 per month. In 2026, Nuru was released to a residential reentry center in San Francisco.

Over a dozen San Francisco employees and city contractors have been either charged or found guilty of bribery, money laundering, and fraud as part of the Nuru corruption scandal.
