= List of California district attorneys =

This is a list of notable people who have held the role of district attorney in California.

== List by county ==
=== Counties (A-M) ===
Alameda County

- Earl Warren (1925-1939)
- Tom Orloff (1994-2009)
- Nancy O'Malley (2009-2023)
- Pamela Price (2023-2024) (Democratic)
- Royl Roberts (interim) (2024-2025)
- Ursula Jones Dickson (2025-present) (Democratic)

Alpine County

- Christopher W. Smith (1977-1981)
- Robert Priscaro (2022-present)

Amador County

- Robert M. Briggs (1862-1867, 1871)
- Anthony Caminetti (1878-1882) (Democratic)
- Gale Cuneo (1979-1983)

Butte County

- Albert F. Jones (1883-1884)
- Michael L. Ramsey (1987-present)

Calaveras County

- William Higby (1853-1859)

Colusa County

- John Poynder (1984-2016)

Contra Costa County

- John A. Nejedly (1958-1969)
- Mark Peterson (2010-2017)
- Diana Becton (2017-present) (Democratic)

Del Norte County

- Michael Riese (1997-2010)
- Jon Alexander (2011-2014)

El Dorado County

- Silas Sanderson (1861-1864)
- Gideon J. Carpenter

Fresno County

- Campbell E. Beaumont (1918-1921)
- Glenn M. DeVore (1926-1934)

Glenn County

Humboldt County

- Walter Van Dyke (1854-1855)
- John J. De Haven (1967-1869)
- Terry Farmer (1983-2002)
- Paul Gallegos (2002-2014)
- Maggie Fleming (2015-2022)
- Stacy Eads (2022- present)

Imperial County

- John Morton Eshleman (1907-1910)
- Phil Swing (1911-1915)

Inyo County

- H.L. Gibbons (1974-1997)

Kern County

- Ed Jagels (1983-2010)

Kings County

- Justin Miller (1915-1918)

Lake County

Lassen County

- Isaac Roop

Los Angeles County

- Kimball H. Dimmick (1852-1853)
- Cameron E. Thom (1854-1857, 1869-1873, 1877-1879)
- Ezra Drown (1857-1859, 1961-1863)
- Edward J. C. Kewen (1859-1861)
- Alfred Chapman (1863-1864, 1867-1869)
- Volney Howard (1864-1867, 1873-1876)
- Stephen M. White (1882-1884)
- George S. Patton (1887-1887) (Democratic)
- James McLachlan (1890-1892) (Republican)
- John D. Fredericks (1903-1915) (Republican)
- Thomas L. Woolwine (1915-1923) (Democratic)
- Asa Keyes (1923-1928) (Republican)
- Buron Fitts (1928-1940) (Republican)
- John F. Dockweiler (1940-1943) (Democratic)
- Frederick N. Howser (1943-1946) (Republican)
- Evelle J. Younger (1964-1971) (Republican)
- Joseph P. Busch (1970-1975)
- John Van de Kamp (1975-1981) (Democratic)
- Robert Philibosian (1982-1984) (Republican)
- Ira Reiner (1984-1992) (Democratic)
- Gil Garcetti (1992-2000) (Republican)
- Steve Cooley (2000-2012) (Republican)
- Jackie Lacey (2012-2020) (Democratic)
- George Gascón (2020-2024) (Democratic)
- Nathan Hochman (2024-present) (Independent)

Madera County

- David Minier (1976-1991)

Marin County

- Thomas J. Bowers (1873-1879)
- Frank M. Angellotti (1885-1891) (Republican)
- Richard M. Sims Jr. (1950-1953)

Mariposa County

Mendocino County

- Frank S. Petersen (1960-1962)
- C. David Eyster (2011-present)

Merced County

- Peter D. Wigginton (1864-1868)
- John Witherspoon Breckinridge (1890-1892)
- Nicole Silveira (2022-present)

Modoc County

- John E. Raker (1895-1899)

Mono County

- George N. Whitman (1868)

Monterey County

- Delos R. Ashley (1851-1852)
- Bradley V. Sargent Jr. (1890-1892)

=== Counties (N-Z) ===
Napa County

- Frank Coombs (1880-1885)
- Theodore Arlington Bell (1895-1903)
- Allison Haley (2016-present)

Nevada County

- John R. McConnell (1852)
- William M. Stewart (1852-1853)
- Niles Searls (1983)
- John Isaiah Caldwell (1870-1871)
- Aaron A. Sargent (1885/86-1886) (Republican)

Orange County

- Tony Rackauckas (1999-2019)
- Todd Spitzer (2019-present)

Placer County

- Jo Hamilton (1860, 1862)

Plumas County

- Ulysses S. Webb (1890-1902)

Riverside County

- Rod Pacheco (2007-2011)
- Michael Hestrin (2014-present) (Republican)

Sacramento County

- Frank Hereford (1855-1857)
- William W. Upton (1861-1864)
- Robert F. Morrison
- Steve White (1989-1995)
- Anne Marie Schubert (2014-2023)
- Thien Ho (2022-present)

San Benito County

- George H. Moore (1917-1927)

San Bernardino County

- Michael A. Ramos (2002-2019) (Republican)
- Jason Anderson (2019-present)

San Diego County

- Thomas W. Sutherland (1851-1852)
- William Jefferson Hunsaker (1882-1884)
- Spencer M. Marsh (1915-1917)
- Bonnie Dumanis (2003-2017) (Republican)
- Summer Stephan (2017-present) (Republican)

San Francisco County (City and County of San Francisco)

- Lewis Francis Byington (1900-1905) (Democratic)
- William Langdon (1906-1910)
- Charles Fickert (1910-1920)
- Matthew Brady (1920-1944) (Democratic)
- Pat Brown (1944-1951) (Democratic)
- Thomas C. Lynch (1951-1964) (Democratic)
- John J. Ferdon (1964-1976)
- Joseph Freitas Jr. (1976-1980)
- Arlo Smith (1980-1996) (Democratic)
- Terence Hallinan (1996-2004) (Democratic)
- Kamala Harris (2004-2011) (Democratic)
- George Gascón (2011-2019) (Democratic)
- Suzy Loftus (interim) (2019-2020) (Democratic)
- Chesa Boudin (2020-2022) (Democratic)
- Brooke Jenkins (2022-present) (Democratic)

San Joaquin County

- Forsythe Charles Clowdsley (1937)

San Luis Obispo County

- Gerald Shea (1998-2013)

San Mateo County

- Charles N. Fox (1858-1862)

Santa Barbara County

- David Minier (1967-1975)
- Thomas W. Sneddon Jr. (1983-2007)

Santa Clara County

- Augustus Rhodes (1859-1860)

Santa Cruz County

- James Harvey Logan (1872-1873, 1875-1880)
- W. D. Storey (1879)
- William T. Jeter (1884-1892)
- Christopher Cottle (1975-1977)

Shasta County

- Jesse W. Carter (1919-1927)
- McGregor W. Scott (1997-2003)

Sierra County

- Tirey L. Ford (1988-1990) (Republican)

Siskiyou County

Solano County

- Joseph McKenna (1866-1868)
- Abram J. Buckles (1879-1884)
- Krishna Abrams (2014-present)

Sonoma County

- Clarence F. Lea (1907-1917)
- Emmett Seawell (1892-1902)

Stanislaus County

- Sherrill Halbert (1949-1954)
- Birgit Fladager (2006-2023)

Sutter County

- Carl Adams (1982-2013)

Tehama County

- Clair Engle (1934-1942)
- Gregg Cohen (1998-2018)

Trinity County

- John Chilton Burch (1853-1856)
- Donna Daly (2018-2020)

Tulare County

Tuolumne County

- Caleb Dorsey (1856-1857)
- John Curtin (1892-1898)

Ventura County

Yolo County

- Charles H. Garoute (1877-1879)

Yuba County

- Isaac S. Belcher (1856-1857) (Know Nothing)
- Edwin Alexander Forbes (1894-1897)

== Deputy district attorneys ==
- Maxine M. Chesney
- Carol Corrigan
- Jeff Gorell
- Kimberly Guilfoyle
- Henry T. Hazard
- Hiram Johnson
- John Miner
- Arthur Ohnimus
- Pierre-Richard Prosper
- Timothy Stoen
- Stanley Weisberg
