= 2026 Alameda County District Attorney election =

Local election in California

- June 2, 2026
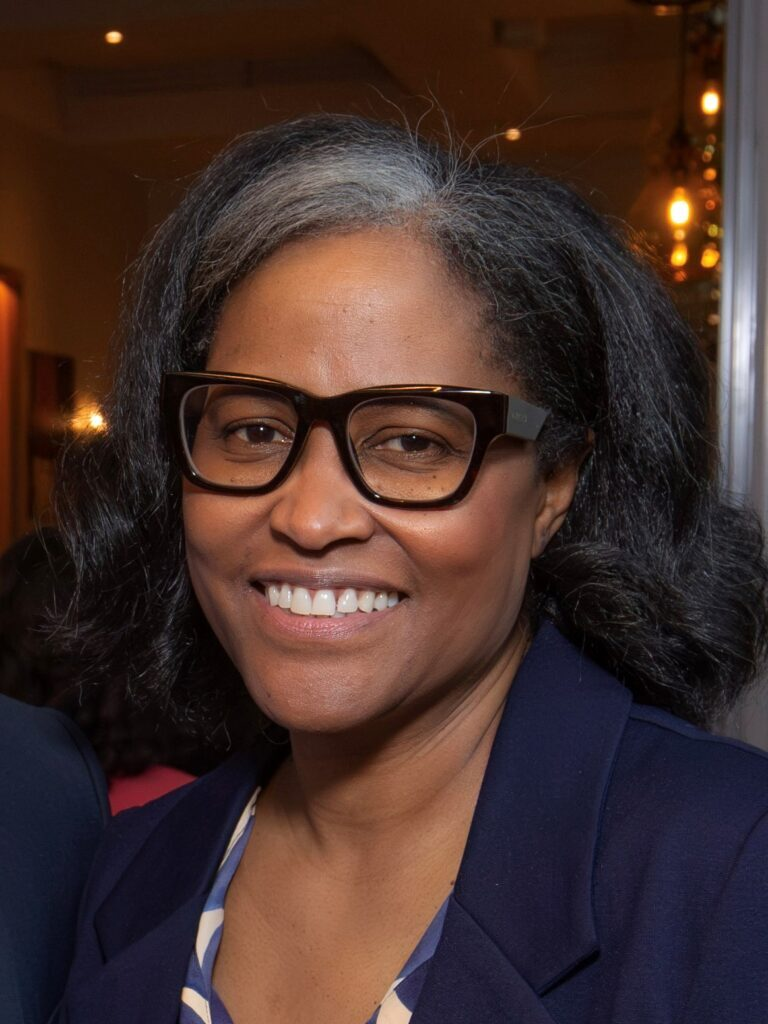

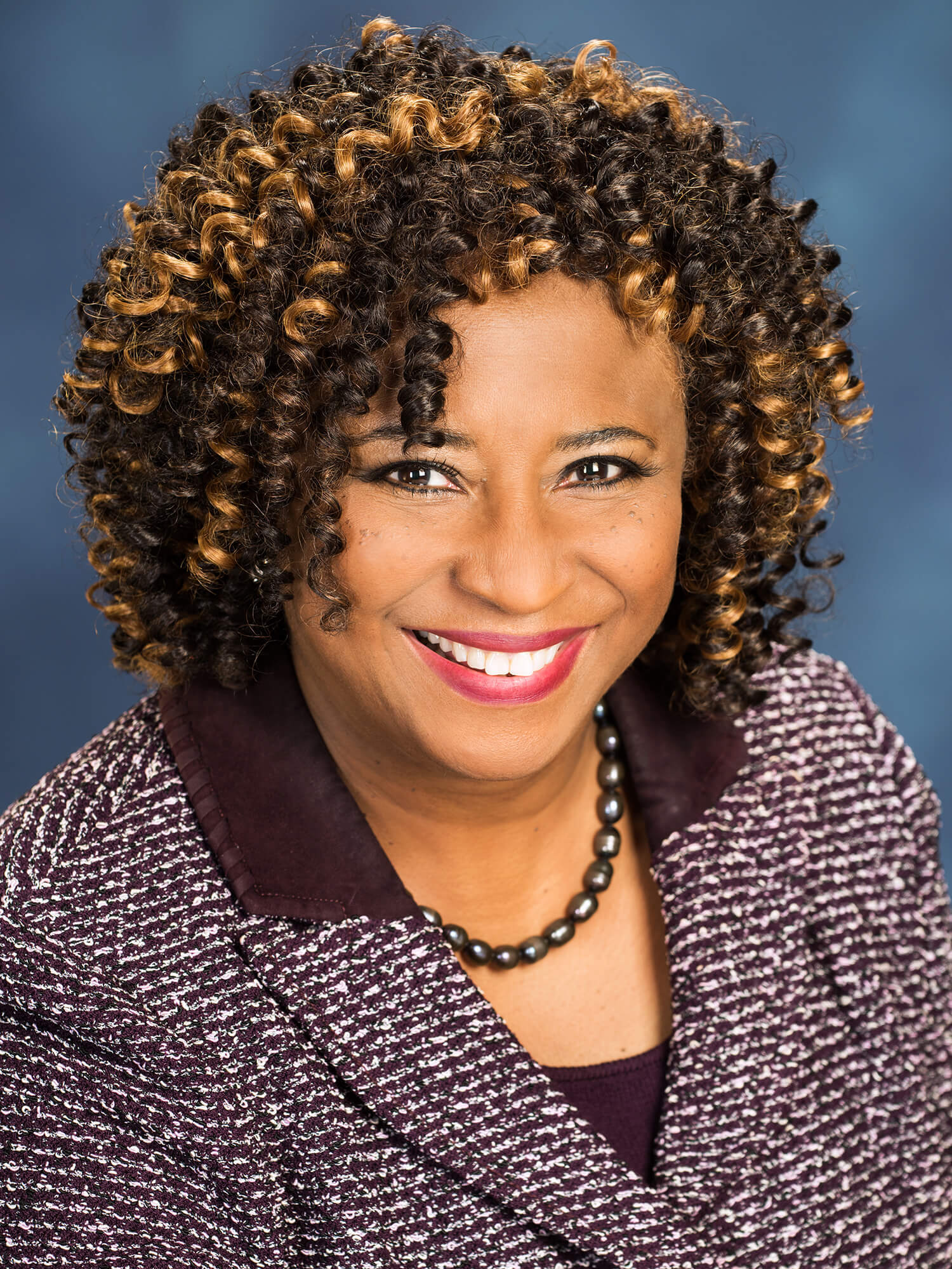

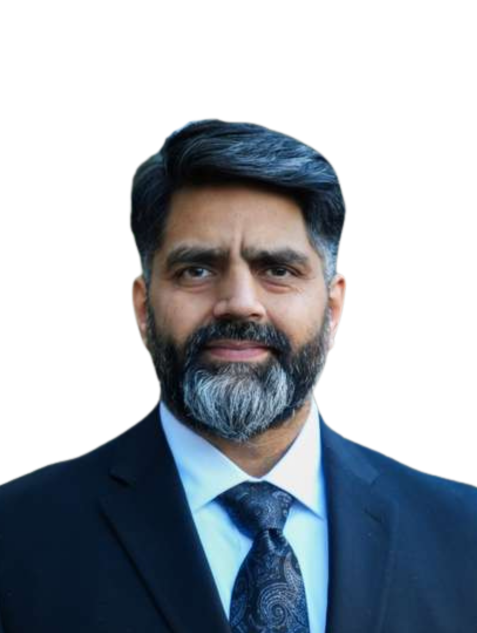
Candidate	Ursula Jones Dickson	Pamela Price	Gopal Krishan
Party	Nonpartisan	Nonpartisan	Nonpartisan
Popular vote	230,043	91,381	36,492
Percentage	64.3%	25.5%	10.2%
District Attorney before election
Ursula Jones Dickson
Elected District Attorney
Ursula Jones Dickson

The 2026 Alameda County District Attorney election was held on June 2, 2026, to elect the district attorney of Alameda County, California. Incumbent district attorney Ursula Jones Dickson was appointed following Pamela Price's removal from office in a 2024 recall election. Both Dickson and Price ran for the position. Dickson was re-elected.

== Candidates ==
=== Declared ===
- Ursula Jones Dickson, incumbent district attorney
- Gopal Krishan, attorney
- Pamela Price, former district attorney (2023–2024)

== Endorsements ==
Ursula Jones Dickson

Statewide officials

- Rob Bonta, attorney general of California (2021–present)

County officials

- Nancy O'Malley, former district attorney of Alameda County (2009–2023)
- Yesenia Sanchez, sheriff of Alameda County (2023–present)

Local officials

- Barbara Lee, mayor of Oakland (2025–present)

Newspapers

- The Mercury News

Political parties

- Alameda County Democratic Party
Pamela Price

County officials

- Larry Krasner, district attorney of Philadelphia, Pennsylvania (2018–present)

Individuals

- Elaine Brown, former Black Panther Party chairwoman
- John Burris, civil rights attorney
- Angela Davis, activist and professor

Newspapers

- The Independent

== Results ==
2026 Alameda County District Attorney election
Candidate	Votes	%
Ursula Jones Dickson (incumbent)	230,043	64.27
Pamela Price	91,381	25.53
Gopal Krishan	36,492	10.20
Total votes	357,916	100.00
