= Geneviéve Jones-Wright =

American lawyer

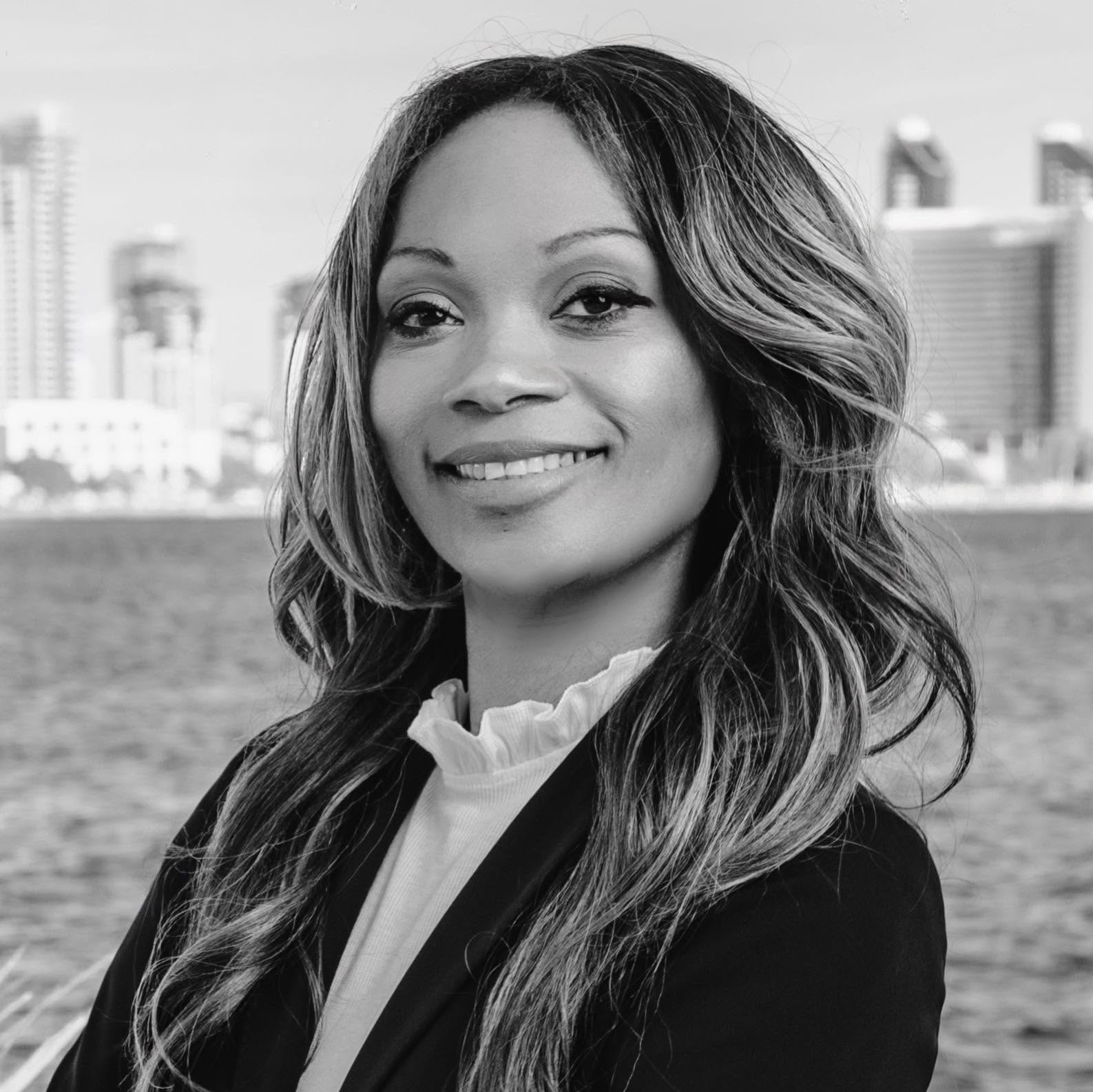
- Born: Geneviéve LaChelle Jones-Wright; San Diego, California, U.S.
- Education: University of San Francisco (BA); Howard University (JD); California Western School of Law (LLM)
- Political party: Democratic

Geneviéve LaChelle Jones-Wright is an American attorney and activist who served as a San Diego County public defender from 2006 to 2019. A member of the Democratic Party, she was an unsuccessful candidate for San Diego County District Attorney in 2018 and mayor of San Diego in 2024. She gained attention for being falsely handcuffed and held at gunpoint by a San Diego police officer in 2016.

== Biography ==
Geneviéve LaChelle Jones-Wright was born and raised in southeastern San Diego by a single mother who worked as a cafeteria worker at Lincoln High School. She graduated from Patrick Henry High School, earned her bachelor's degree from the University of San Francisco, obtained her Juris Doctor degree from Howard University School of Law, and later pursued a Master of Laws from California Western School of Law.

Jones-Wright began her legal career as a public defender in San Diego in 2006. She served on San Diego’s Commission on Gang Prevention and Intervention and volunteered as a legal reviewer for the California Innocence Project. In March 2021, she was inducted into the San Diego County Women's Hall of Fame in recognition of her activism.

In January 2016, Jones-Wright was involved in a notable incident where she was pulled over and handcuffed at gunpoint by police in front of Malcolm X Library in Valencia Park due to a reported DMV error regarding her license plates. The incident, which she recorded and shared on her Facebook page, raised questions about law enforcement practices in San Diego County.

== Political campaigns ==
In 2018, Jones-Wright ran for San Diego County District Attorney against interim District Attorney Summer Stephan, who had been serving since the resignation of Bonnie Dumanis in July 2017. During her campaign, Jones-Wright emphasized her support for criminal justice reform, including prioritizing public safety and rehabilitation over increased prosecution, the testing of every rape kit in San Diego, and for increased rights and protections for voluntary sex workers. She also criticized the war on drugs and argued in favor of rolling back cannabis possession convictions and defending California's cannabis laws against federal intervention.

She was endorsed by then-Senator Kamala Harris, then-Lieutenant Governor of California Gavin Newsom, businessman George Soros, Assemblymember Lorena Gonzalez-Fletcher, the San Diego County Democratic Party, and NFL player and activist Malcolm Jenkins.

Ultimately, Jones-Wright lost the June 5, 2018 primary election outright to Summer Stephan, garnering 37.02% of the vote to Stephan's 62.62%.

=== 2024 San Diego mayoral candidacy ===
In December 2023, Jones-Wright announced plans to run for Mayor of San Diego in 2024 against incumbent Todd Gloria. During the campaign, she criticized Gloria's housing and homeless policies, arguing for stricter regulations on short-term home rentals. Despite her progressive views, she faced challenges garnering support from key political figures who had endorsed her in her previous campaign for District Attorney. Jones-Wright was endorsed by San Diego County Supervisor Monica Montgomery Steppe but was not endorsed by Vice President Kamala Harris or Governor Gavin Newsom, who had previously endorsed her run for District Attorney, instead supporting Todd Gloria's re-election bid. Additionally, many progressive groups, such as the LGBTQ Victory Fund, Equality California, and the San Diego County Democratic Party, chose to endorse Gloria's re-election bid over Jones-Wright's candidacy.

In the March 5th, 2024 primary, she received only 16% of the vote to incumbent Mayor Todd Gloria and independent San Diego police officer Larry Turner, who garnered 50% and 23% of the vote, respectively. She did not advance to the general election.
