= Killing of Melvin Black =

1979 homicide in Oakland, California, U.S.

Melvin Black (born c. 1964) was an African-American teenager who was shot and killed by the Oakland Police Department on March 17, 1979. The altercation occurred outside of the housing project where Black lived, and he died trying to run upstairs to his apartment.

Involved parties included officers Glenn Tomek, Ken Thornberry, Steve Bunting, and Joe Thomas. Initial reports of the incident from the officers alleged that Black had pointed a .45 caliber pistol at police, but it was later discovered to only be a pellet gun. The officers allegedly sought to arrest Black because they mistook him for someone who had reportedly been shooting at a freeway offramp close to 53rd Street.

News coverage compared Black's killing to other instances of fatal police shootings, including the killing of fourteen-year-old Tyrone Guyton in the neighboring city of Emeryville on November 1, 1973.

The District Attorney's office initially found the officers to have been acting lawfully, and in self-defense. This first incident report stated that Black was shot five times by officers after ignoring their command to freeze and pointing a gun at one officer's chest, which was corroborated by a civilian witness.

According to Deputy City Attorney Michael Stamp, Black's mother filed a $5 million dollar wrongful death claim against the city of Oakland in June 1979.

== Investigation and legacy ==
Just three days after the shooting, the NAACP and Councilman Carter Gilman called on the city of Oakland to carry out an independent investigation of Black's death, and possible civil rights violations. The day after that, U.S. Attorney William Hunter said the FBI would also investigate. The following week, three police officers conducted a raid on a NAACP office, looking for two people that the NAACP claimed had offered information on Black's death. One of these officers was Ken Thornberry, who had been one of the officers involved in the initial shooting.

Then-mayor of Oakland Lionel Wilson appointed local civil rights attorney John Burris to independently investigate the case. He was reportedly paid $50 an hour by the city for his investigation, as well as given money to pay private investigators. This was Burris' first foray into the public eye, and he went on to represent Rodney King in his lawsuit against the LAPD and Oscar Grant's mother in her lawsuit against BART Police for her son's death. Another notable case of his (Allen v. City of Oakland) also concerned police misconduct in Oakland, where four officers of the OPD were accused of beating and planting drugs on suspects, many of whom were African-American. Burris also represented musician Tupac Shakur in his lawsuit against the Oakland Police Department where he claimed officers stopped him for jaywalking and "mocked his name."

A female witness testified that she had overheard officers telling Black to freeze from her car, and watched him point a gun at the officers, which corroborated the story recorded in the District Attorney's original report. Burris' report, notably, made no mention of this witness. Instead, Burris criticized the officers' rush to arrest, instead of taking the time to confirm that Black matched the description of the freeway sniper they initially believed him to be. He also accused officers of issuing contradicting instructions to Black; telling him both to freeze and to put his hands on the car. Black's hesitation to surrender to officers is what they claimed led them to pull the trigger, and Burris believed that Black's confusion at these contradictory messages from police is what got him killed, meaning it was the officers' fault for being unclear.

In the account of events provided in the Burris Report, Black never pointed a gun at the officers, but instead took the gun out of his waist and put it on a nearby car and was running away from the officers when they fired a total of thirteen shots at him. Burris also argued that Officers Bunting and Thomas who watched the scene unfold from a patrol car yet corroborated the other officers' stories, would not have been able to clearly see what happened from where they were seated. Burris also pointed to discrepancies in the officers' testimonies, where Officers Tomek and Thornberry gave differing accounts of how Black's arm was angled when he allegedly pointed the gun at them. Burris also questioned how the pellet gun ended up on the trunk of a car by the end of the altercation, especially because the police pathologist found that there was no evidence the gun had been thrown at or fell onto the car. Thus, Burris claimed, Black had put down the gun while running away instead of pointing it at the officers. Melvin Black's relatives told reporters that witnesses, "never located by the newspapers" had corroborated that Black had placed the gun on the car in surrender before he was shot.

Burris' finding that the officers did not act justifiably was disputed by OPD Police Chief George T. Hart, who called the report contradictory to the findings of the police department's own investigation. Robert Foster, the president of the Oakland Police Officers Association, called Burris' investigation "clearly prejudiced from the beginning." The U.S. and district attorney's office both sided with police, and although Mayor Lionel Wilson advocated for the release of the full report to the public, the city attorney office decided to keep it private. On April 6, the Alameda County Coroner's office found Black's death to be a "justifiable homicide." Because of the police's refusal to accept Burris' findings, several angry citizens established the Citizens' Police Review Board (CPRB), which would investigate similar cases of possible police misconduct.

After Burris' report was published, both officers Bunting and Thomas resigned from Oakland's Police Department.

== See also ==
- 1970s in political history
