= Chanin =

Chanin is a surname. Notable people with the surname include:

- Alabama Chanin, American fashion designer
- Gavin Chanin (born 1986), California winemaker and artist
- Irwin Chanin (1891–1988), American architect
- Jack Chanin (1907–1997), US-based Ukrainian magician
- Jim Chanin (born 1947), American attorney
- Marie-Lise Chanin (born 1934), French geophysicist and aeronomist
- Nathan Chanin (1885–1965), Belarusian-American labor leader
