= Police abuse of sex workers in the United States =

Sex worker abuse by police officers can occur in one or more ways. Police brutality refers to the intentional use of excessive force by a police officer, be it physical, verbal, or psychological. Police corruption is a form of police misconduct where an officer obtains financial benefits and/or career advancements in exchange for not pursuing, or selectively pursuing, an investigation or arrest. Police misconduct refers to inappropriate actions taken by police officers in connection with their official duties. Sex workers, particularly poor sex workers and those who had been manipulated, coerced, or forced into sex work, are at risk of being obliged or otherwise forced to provide free sexual services to police officers out of fear of being harmed or arrested. Some sex workers have reported that they have encountered police officers who have physically assaulted them without evidence of a crime and without making an arrest.

Studies have been conducted to examine the extent and frequency of abuse experienced by sex workers in the United States. Steven D. Levitt and Sudhir Alladi Venkatesh have noted that there has been difficulty in obtaining reliable data due to prostitution being largely illegal in the United States, rendering standard data sources uninformative. A 2005 study of sex workers found that 16% have experienced police violence. According to another study, a third of violence against sex workers is committed by police officers.

Concerns have been raised about the health and rights of sex workers and the role police have in either improving or worsening them by utilizing prostitution law, with some critics stating that in areas such as Washington, D.C., the laws effectively "legitimized unconstitutional police behavior that had long existed in the District."

Police abuse can have long-lasting consequences. Sex workers who are forced to move to another area can end up in areas where they feel less safe, and there have been reports of disrupted medication routines and medical schedules due to arrests. Organizations such as Human Rights Watch have stated that police abuse in countries such as the United States has led to sex workers becoming distrustful of officers, deterring them from reporting attacks from clients, and are one of the primary sources of violence. Some sex workers have further reported that they see the legal system as being unhelpful, as they feel that the system does not provide them with access to resources, that it pressures them to accept guilty pleas even when innocent, and the process of arrest and trial is humiliating.

== Street prostitution ==
Sex workers may engage in street prostitution for a multitude of reasons; one of the most intrinsic reasons is as a survival tool against poverty. Socialist feminists have cited "oppressive capitalistic processes for why women enter into street prostitution." Certain communities may be more vulnerable to prostitution. In the United States there are street prostitutes of all races who are uneducated and/or impoverished due to inequity and lack of resources due to factors such as class and race. In addition, experts and feminists have argued that the marginalization of poor women of color has made it more likely for them to be led into prostitution. Some critics have stated that police officers have dehumanized sex workers and Amnesty International has noted that in the past, Los Angeles police officers would mark cases involving sex workers, especially black sex workers, as N.H.I. - "No Human Involved". In New York City, a suspected prostitute caught carrying a condom could have been arrested by police for soliciting sex.

Scholar Jacquelyn Monroe has noted that prostitution laws are unevenly enforced and that sex workers engaging in street prostitution are more at risk of being arrested, while sex buyers are not. Research has also stated that there is a sex stigma named "whore-stigma" attached to street prostitution that reinforces hierarchies and dehumanizes street prostitutes and that harassment is pervasive. Sex workers have reported "experiencing verbal degradation, cursing, insults, and racial slurs from the police" and being harassed when engaging in non-criminal activities. They have also reported that they are reluctant to report crimes against them such as rape, as they state that there is a risk of them being ignored or receiving punishment such as fines, incarceration, or deportation instead.

Society's social construct of sex workers historically; been given the role of social outcast someone to be ignored and dismissed. Because of this social construct it subconsciously legitimizes their "otherness" to society. With these perceptions society can stigmatize and dehumanize the prostitute. As stated earlier this is one of the contributing factors of "whore-stigma".

== Decriminalizing sex work ==
Some international public health and human rights organizations have pushed for the decriminalization of sex work, stating that it would allow sex workers to work in safe conditions while also improving access to legal and health systems. Proponents have also argued that it can contribute to reduced stigma, discrimination, and marginalization that comes with being a sex worker, as well as curbing the abuse experienced by police officers. There are also concerns that continued criminalization makes it more difficult for sex workers to escape the industry, as multiple fines, imprisonments, and criminal records make it difficult to find legal employment and resources, leaving the worker with few other avenues to make money. Organizations such as the Global Health Justice Partnership and Sex Workers Project Of the Urban Justice Center have performed research to understand how the criminalization of prostitution impacts the lives of sex workers.

Concerns with decriminalization is that this would not immediately eliminate sex work stigma or the violence, substance use, or economic marginalizing that can characterize the lives of sex workers. Jennifer Toller Erauquin has noted that the government must make a concentrated effort to decriminalize sex work and to change policing practices when it comes to sex workers, as police have a responsibility to ensure public safety, including the safety of female sex workers. Ine Vanwesenbeeck has noted that in order to decriminalize sex work the government and society have to acknowledge that sex work is work. She argues that this would empower sex workers by reducing the stigma and violence that they experience and that as other countries have introduced regimes of partial legislation, this can be done in countries such as the United States.

== Notable instances of violence ==
=== Daniel Holtzclaw ===
On June 18, 2014, Oklahoma City Officer Daniel Holtzclaw pulled over a 57-year-old woman and forced her to perform oral sex upon him. The woman, who had no prior records, filed a police report the following day and in the following investigation Holtzclaw was charged with 36 counts of sexual abuse offenses including rape in the first and second degrees, sexual battery, procuring lewd exhibition, stalking, and forcible oral sodomy. He was brought to trial and convicted on 18 out of the 36 counts and sentenced to 236 years in prison. During the trial prosecutors stated that Holtzclaw targeted women in poor communities who had drug or prostitution records, as he assumed that they would be unlikely to file a report.

=== Celeste Guap ===
In 2017 the Oakland City Council agreed to pay a settlement of nearly one million dollars to Celeste Guap, a former underaged prostitute. Guap stated that she had been exploited and sexually assaulted by approximately two dozen officers from the Oakland, Richmond, Livermore, and Contra Costa County departments, which included encounters prior to her reaching the legal age of consent. Guap has further expressed an unwillingness to testify due to fears for her own safety as she still resides in the Bay Area where the crimes were committed.
