= Marie-Lise =

Marie-Lise or Marie Lise is a French feminine given name. Notable people with this name include:

- Marie-Lise Chanin (born 1934), French geophysicist and aeronomist
- Marie Lise Monique Émond (1930–2020), Canadian actress

== See also ==
- Marie, a female given name
