= Robert Warshaw =

Robert S. Warshaw is an American law enforcement official and former Associate Director of the White House Office of National Drug Control Policy, commonly referred to as the "deputy drug czar." Warshaw, appointed to the position in 1998, served under ONDCP Director Barry McCaffrey. He previously served as Chief of the Rochester Police Department. Upon being appointed to the ONDCP, Warshaw was succeeded as police chief by Robert Duffy, later Mayor of Rochester and lieutenant governor of New York State.

Warshaw currently is a police management and corporate consultant; is an auditor for the United States Department of Justice in reviewing compliance with procedural revisions ordered by federal courts (e.g., federal oversight of the Oakland, CA police department); and is an evaluator for the Office of Oversight Commissioner, which oversees police operations in Northern Ireland. He is a former member of the Executive Committee of the International Association of Chiefs of Police.

In January 2014, U.S. Federal Judge G. Murray Snow appointed Robert Warshaw, former Rochester, New York, police chief, to act as monitor over the Maricopa County Sheriff's Office. He has earned more than $31 million in fees from this appointment, drawing criticism from county attorney Rachel Mitchell and others. Warshaw has also been accused of milking the Oakland Police Department of millions during his oversight thereof.

Warshaw is a former officer in the United States Army and earned a bachelor's degree in sociology and a master's degree in human resources administration.
