= Jim Chanin =

American civil rights attorney in California

James B. Chanin (born April 16, 1947) is an American civil rights attorney, based in Oakland, California. Chanin has been an attorney since 1978, and is best known for his representation of victims in the “Oakland Riders” case, and as one of the two plaintiffs’ attorneys in the Riders Negotiated Settlement Agreement (NSA). Although best known for his cases involving police misconduct, Chanin has also represented police officers and other police department employees.

== Early life and education ==
Chanin was born in Harrison, New York. He attended public schools in Harrison and graduated from high school in June, 1965. After two years at George Washington University, he transferred to the University of California, Berkeley. He received three degrees at UC Berkeley: a BA in 1969, and MA in 1971, and a Ph.C in 1973. He graduated from USF Law School in 1977 and was admitted to the State Bar of California that same year.

== Berkeley Police Review Commission ==
In 1973, the concept of civilian review of police was at a crossroads. The New York City Police Review Board proposal had been voted down in a referendum in the 1960s and community control of the police in Berkeley had been defeated nearly 2–1 in 1971. In 1972, Chanin joined the Police Initiatives Committee, where he helped work on the successful initiative campaign where voters established the PRC in Berkeley.

During Chanin's tenure on the PRC, the commission was successful in making significant changes in the BPD. The PRC established complaint procedures and held Boards of Inquiry on numerous complaints. In the policy arena, the PRC supported the procurement of bullet proof vests. It opposed the Mobile Unique Situation Team (MUST) that had been set up by Berkeley police officers on their own without departmental supervision. MUST had no real process for screening officers who were not suited for SWAT team work. The PRC disapproved the MUST team and the Berkeley City Manager's office assured the commission that the manager would abide by their recommendation on the MUST team. The MUST team was later reconstituted as a SWAT unit which was part of the BPD and had an emphasis on hostage negotiation.

The commission also voted to reject Berkeley police participation in a controversial civil disorder management course, which had been previously attended by nine Berkeley police captains and lieutenants. "Commissioner Jim Chanin labelled the course a 'school for counter-revolution.' Chanin cited parts of the course material which 'attempt to link up apostles of non-violent action, like Dr. Martin Luther King and Cesar Chavez, with some sort of conspiratorial revolutionary attempt to overthrow the government.'" Berkeley Police Chief Wesley Pomeroy ultimately refused to allow any more police attendance at the course, given by the California Specialized Training Institute in San Luis Obispo, because its political and philosophical orientation was “not neutral, gives undue importance to 'the agitator'...and leads inevitably towards confrontation.” Chanin also attended a “Political Violence and Terrorism Seminar” course on October 14, 1976. The police chief also agreed to ban Berkeley police from attending that course as well.

== Legal career ==
Chanin attributes his decision to become a lawyer to his exposure to the police response to political demonstrations in the 1960s and 1970s. In 1972, he joined the Police Initiatives Committee, where he helped work on the successful initiative campaign in which voters established a Police Review Commission (PRC) in Berkeley. He is quoted as saying that he became an attorney because he wanted to help people. He is not satisfied until he knows that he has done everything possible to help his clients attain the result they deserve. He was a member of the first PRC and was twice elected chairperson of the commission.

=== Police Litigation and Notable Civil Rights Cases ===
==== Oakland Riders Case (2000-2014) ====
The Allen v. City of Oakland lawsuit was filed in December 2000 by Chanin, his associate Julie Houk, and John Burris, in response to a pattern and practice of civil rights abuses by members of the Oakland Police Department (OPD) who became known as the “Riders.” Eventually, one hundred nineteen (119) individual plaintiffs, almost all of whom were African Americans, joined the litigation. The plaintiffs’ claims involved a litany of constitutional violations, including, false arrests, unreasonable seizures, false imprisonments, the planting of evidence, excessive use of force, falsification of police reports, racially biased policing and kidnapping. Ultimately, the 119 individual plaintiffs who joined the lawsuit collectively settled their damage claims with the City of Oakland for $10.5 million.

As a result of this litigation, the city agreed to enact and implement institutional reforms by way of a separate, non-monetary settlement agreement, known as the Negotiated Settlement Agreement (NSA), to prevent the recurrence of the civil rights violations that gave rise to this litigation and to bring the OPD into step with contemporary, professional policing practices. The NSA was entered as an order of the federal court on January 22, 2003.

In 2012, due to the city's chronic failure to fully comply with the reforms mandated by the NSA, Chanin, along with attorneys Julie Houk and John Burris, filed a motion with the Federal Court seeking to have a receiver appointed in order to force the city and OPD to finally come into compliance with the reforms mandated by the NSA. In March 2013, the Court appointed Thomas Frazier, the former commissioner of the Baltimore Police Department, as the compliance director. In February 2014, the Court consolidated the duties of the Compliance Director with those of the Independent Monitor.

==== Scott Olsen v. City of Oakland, et al. (2011-2014) ====
Chanin, along with attorneys Julie Houk and Rachel Lederman, obtained a $4.5 million settlement for military veteran Scott Olsen as a result of the permanent brain injuries he suffered when he was shot in the head by a police officer with a so-called "less lethal" munition on October 25, 2011, during a demonstration in support of Occupy Oakland.

In an independent investigation commissioned by the City of Oakland, numerous police officers testified that they did not witness Olsen lying on the street. Former Baltimore Police Commissioner Thomas Frazier found that "the fact that no law enforcement officer, supervisor, or commander observed the person falling down or prostrate in the street during the confrontation was unsettling and not believable."

==== Estate of Amaro v. City of Oakland, et al. (2009-2011) ====
In 2011, Chanin and attorneys Julie Houk and John Burris recovered $1.7 million from the City of Oakland in conjunction with the death of Jerry Amaro III. In 2000, Mr. Amaro was arrested and beaten by undercover, plainclothes OPD officers, and he subsequently died from the injuries he sustained during this arrest. Mr. Amaro's mother became aware of the true facts concerning the homicide only after someone within the OPD with specific knowledge of the misconduct and subsequent cover-up leaked information concerning the case to the press in 2009.

==== Warrants Class Action (2008-2010) ====
In 2008, Chanin, along with attorneys Julie Houk and John Burris, filed the Oliver v. City of Oakland, et al. class action lawsuit against the City of Oakland. This case arose from a pattern and practice by the Oakland Police Department in which affidavits with false information were presented to Alameda County Superior Court judges who signed warrants authorizing the police to enter people's homes and search their persons, belongings and houses. Ultimately, over 100 individuals were identified as class members in this lawsuit. In 2010, the case settled for $6,500,000.

==== Smith Class Action (2006-2008) ====
In 2005, Chanin, in concert with Julie Houk and John Burris, obtained a settlement in excess of $2.2 million on behalf of Asian American women who were victimized by an on-duty Oakland police officer. The officer is alleged to have committed acts of sexual misconduct after stopping the women for minor or invented traffic violations.

==== OPD Excessive Force at the Port of Oakland (2003) ====
Chanin was on the legal team that filed a suit against the City of Oakland on behalf of protesters injured by the police in an anti-war demonstration at the Port of Oakland on April 7, 2003. The protest was against the invasion of Iraq by US forces. Police opened fire with non-lethal projectiles at anti-war demonstrations, injuring both demonstrators and longshoremen caught in the line of fire. The New York Times stated, "At least 58 people were injured, including nine longshoremen who were caught in the crossfire on their way to work."

The protestors' lawsuit charging excessive force eventually led to a settlement providing over $1.5 million in damages for medical and legal expenses, ranging from $5,000 to $500,000 per plaintiff. The OPD also agreed to revise its crowd-control policy, banning indiscriminate use of wooden and rubber bullets, and requiring fair warning to disperse. Plaintiff's attorney Chanin stated, "The settlements are a vindication. It was not appropriate use of force….We got the comprehensive crowd-control policy and every single person got money, with serious compensation for the most serious injured."

As part of the lawsuit, Chanin took a number of depositions including that of Assistant Chief Howard Jordan in April 2005. Jordan testified that OPD officers had secretly infiltrated a May 12, 2003 demonstration to protest the April 2003 police action and were elected to be leaders at that demonstration.

=== Prison Litigation ===
From 1989 to 1994, three times as many inmates were shot to death by prison guards in California as in all federal and all other state prisons during the same period. The California Department of Corrections allowed guards to use firearms to break up fistfights. By contrast, in Texas, only one rifle shot was fired in the 129,000 inmate system in 1995.

Chanin won a $300,000 settlement with the state of California over the killing of a prisoner. In an interview with the Los Angeles Times, Chanin stated, “The other states have found a way to protect officer safety and yet at the same time prevent the taking of life."

Lawsuits and critical newspaper stories highlighting California's quick resort to gunfire in prisons were credited as a factor which forced the state to crack down on shootings in prison housing units and exercise yards. Chanin and co-counsel John Scott and Julie Houk were successful in two lawsuits that obtained settlements for inmates shot and killed by prison guards. One case, a shooting in Calipatria, occurred in 1994 and a second, a shooting in Salinas Valley State Prison, took place in 1998. In 1995, the Department of Corrections began prohibiting the use of firearms to break up fistfights. Attorney Steve Fama of the Prison Law Office at San Quentin told the press, "Officially or unofficially, It was made clear to the line officers that guns were not to be used to break up garden-variety fistfights."

One of Chanin's most well-known prison cases involved Vaughn Dortch, who had been confined to the isolation unit known as the “Violence Control Unit” at the Pelican Bay State Prison. Prison guards forced Mr. Dortch to bathe in scalding hot water resulting in massive burns to the lower part of his body. His case was featured on “60 Minutes.” Chanin and his associate, Julie Houk, obtained a settlement of $997,000 for Mr. Dortch, and Mr. Dortch's incident also figured prominently in the Madrid v. Gomez case which resulted in significant reforms at Pelican Bay State Prison.
