= 2024 Alameda County District Attorney recall election =

- November 5, 2024
- Shall Pamela Price be recalled (removed) from the office of District Attorney?

Results
Choice	Votes	%
Yes	375,442	62.92%
No	221,285	37.08%
Valid votes	596,727	100.00%
Invalid or blank votes	0	0.00%
Total votes	596,727	100.00%
Results by consolidated precinct
Yes (for recall): 50–60% 60–70% 70–80% >80%	No (against recall): 50–60% 60–70% 70–80% >80%	Tie No votes
District Attorney before election
Pamela Price
Elected District Attorney
Ursula Jones Dickson (appointed)

The 2024 Alameda County District Attorney recall election was a successful special recall election to remove Alameda County District Attorney Pamela Price. It was held on November 5, 2024.

== Background ==
Price was originally elected to the District Attorney office in 2022, with 53% of the vote, beating out Terry Wiley. Price ran with her experience as a criminal defense attorney, fighting against discrimination and retaliation. During her time in office, she was accused of being soft on crime over lax prosecution, such as when her office initially suggested noncarceral charges against the gang members involved the highway shooting death of 23-month-old Jasper Wu. (Price eventually pursued charges that involved prison time with the possibility of parole.)

Price was also condemned for completing a plea bargain in March 2024, in which David Xu, a metallurgist at Berkeley Engineering and Research who had been on home monitoring while awaiting trial for attempted murder and poisoning, would get only probation for repeatedly poisoning a co-worker with cadmium, and then have his criminal record expunged upon completing probation. The judge described Price's offer as being "extremely generous" to the defendant.

The Alameda Voter Registrar confirmed on April 15, 2024 that the recall effort had the 73,195 valid signatures necessary to trigger a recall election.

== Election ==
The Alameda County Board of Supervisors confirmed that the petition met valid signature requirements. The board voted to consolidate the recall election with the general elections in November 2024, given it would be cheaper than a special election. It was estimated a special election would cost 15 to 20 million dollars, compared to adding the recall question to general ballots being about 4 million.

If the recall question passed by a majority vote, Price would lose office and her principal deputy would act temporarily. The Alameda County Board of Supervisors would appoint an interim replacement until the voters choose a new permanent successor in 2026.

U.S. Representative Eric Swalwell, Price's direct predecessor Nancy O'Malley, all 14 county police unions, the San Francisco Chronicle, and the East Bay Times supported the recall, while U.S. Representative Barbara Lee and state senator Nancy Skinner opposed it.

Price would lose by a nearly 63–37 margin, formally conceding on November 19. Price's defeat would follow a trend of citizens rejecting "progressive prosecutors" that had been elected in years prior. Simultaneously, Los Angeles County DA George Gascón lost re-election to the more conservative attorney Nathan Hochman. Price would be recalled only two years after Chesa Boudin had been recalled in neighboring San Francisco. Additionally, Alameda County also voted by 23 points in favor of Proposition 36, which repealed the 2014 California proposition that reduced many felonies such as shoplifting to misdemeanors.

== See also ==
- 2022 San Francisco District Attorney recall election
