= Alameda County District Attorney's Office =

Legal agency

District Attorney of Alameda County
- Seal of Alameda County

- Flag of Alameda County

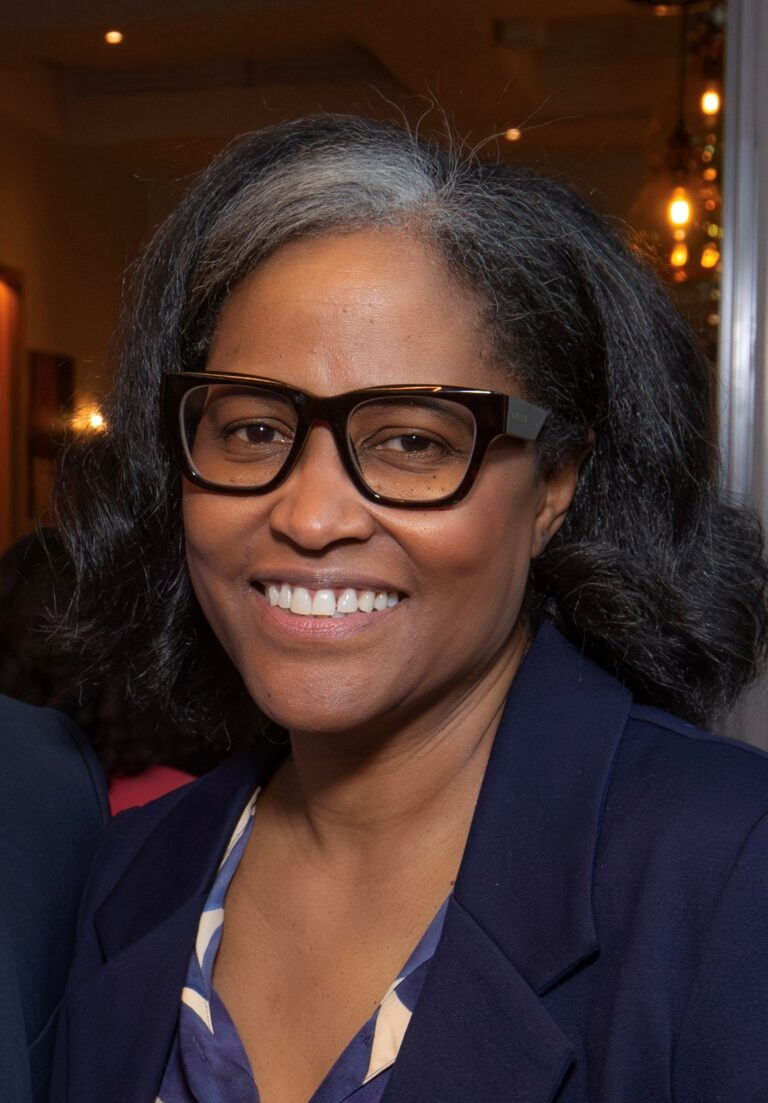
- Incumbent; Ursula Jones Dickson since February 18, 2025
- Type: District attorney
- Seat: René C. Davidson Courthouse; Oakland, California
- Formation: 1853
- First holder: William H. Combs
- Salary: $382,741 (2023)
- Website: da.alamedacountyca.gov

The Alameda County District Attorney's Office is the legal agency charged with prosecuting felony and misdemeanor crimes in Alameda County, California. Ursula Jones Dickson has served as district attorney since 2025.

Occupants of this office have gone on to serve in the California State Legislature and the United States House of Representatives and as mayor of Oakland, attorney general of California, secretary of state of California, governor of California, and chief justice of the United States.

== History ==
The Alameda County District Attorney's Office was created in 1853 upon the establishment of Alameda County. William H. Combs was appointed the first district attorney upon the office's creation. In the office's early decades, district attorneys often came from private practice and served short terms in office before either returning to private practice, becoming judges, or seeking higher political office.

Earl Warren served as Alameda County district attorney from 1925 to 1939. He would later go on to serve one term as attorney general of California and three terms as governor of California, and he was also chosen by New York governor Thomas E. Dewey as the Republican vice presidential nominee in the 1948 presidential election. In 1953, he was nominated for chief justice of the United States by President Dwight D. Eisenhower and served until 1969. The Warren Court handed down a number of landmark decisions, including Brown v. Board of Education (1954), Gideon v. Wainwright (1963), Heart of Atlanta Motel, Inc. v. United States (1964), Griswold v. Connecticut (1965), Miranda v. Arizona (1966), and Loving v. Virginia (1967).

In 2009, Nancy O'Malley became the first woman to serve as Alameda County district attorney. She retired in 2022 and vowed not to choose a successor, allowing the first open election for district attorney since Warren's retirement in 1938. Pamela Price was elected to succeed her, becoming the county's first African American district attorney. Price is also the county's first district attorney to be recalled, having lost a recall effort against her in 2024. The Alameda County Board of Supervisors appointed Ursula Jones Dickson to succeed Price in 2025.

== List of Alameda County district attorneys ==
#	Name	Term
1	William H. Combs	1853–1854
2	John S. Chipman	1854–1855
3	George M. Blake	1855–1856
4	William Van Voorhies	1856–1857
5	William H. Glascock	1857–1859
6	William W. Crane	1859–1863
7	Stephen G. Nye	1863–1865
8	George M. Blake	1865–1869
9	Oscar H. La Grange	1869–1871
10	Stephen P. Wright	1869–1871
11	A. A. Moore	1871–1875
12	John R. Glascock	1875–1877
13	Henry Vrooman	1877–1879
14	E. M. Gibson	1879–1883
15	Samuel P. Hall	1883–1889
16	George W. Reed	1889–1893
17	Charles E. Snook	1893–1899
18	John J. Allen	1899–1907
19	Everett Brown	1907–1909
20	William Donahue	1909–1913
21	William H. L. Hines	1913–1917
22	Ezra Decoto	1917–1925
23	Earl Warren	1925–1939
24	Ralph E. Hoyt	1939–1947
25	J. Frank Coakley	1947–1969
26	D. Lowell Jensen	1969–1981
27	John J. Meehan	1981–1994
28	Tom Orloff	1994–2009
29	Nancy O'Malley	2009–2023
30	Pamela Price	2023–2024
–	Royl Roberts (acting)	2024–2025
31	Ursula Jones Dickson	2025–present
