= Government of San Diego County, California =

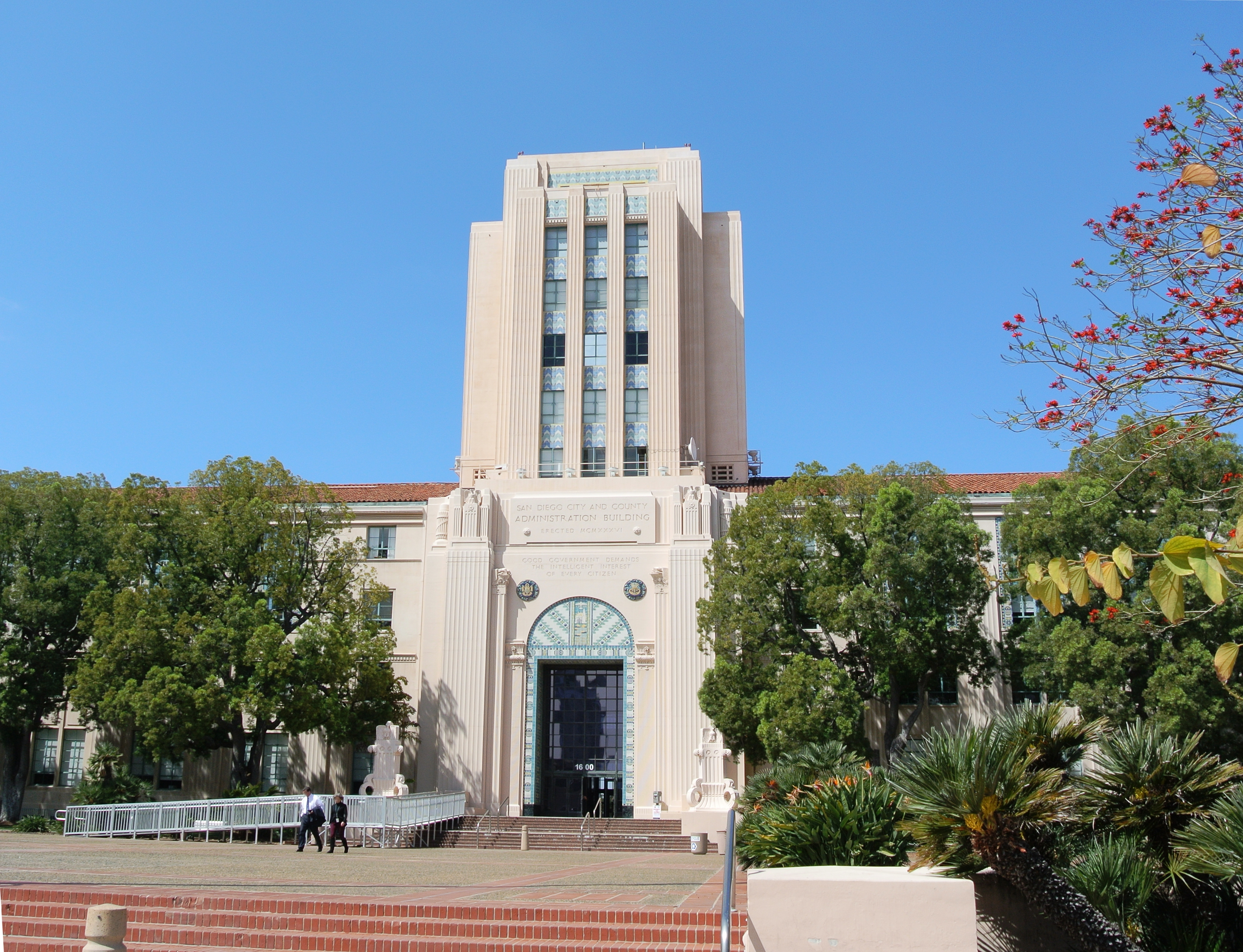
San Diego County Administration Center building, built 1938

The government of San Diego County operates as a charter county under the California Constitution, California law, and the Charter of the County of San Diego. Much of the government of California is in practice the responsibility of county governments such as San Diego County. The county government provides countywide services such as elections and voter registration, law enforcement, jails, vital records, property records, tax collection, public health, and social services. In addition the county serves as the local government for all unincorporated areas.

It is composed of the elected five-member Board of Supervisors, several other elected offices and officers including the Sheriff, District Attorney, Assessor/Recorder/County Clerk, and Treasurer/Tax Collector, and numerous county departments and entities under the supervision of the Chief Administrative Officer such as the Probation Department.

Some chartered municipalities such as the city of San Diego and the city of Chula Vista provide their own law enforcement, public safety, libraries, parks and recreation, zoning, and similar services. Other incorporated cities have some or all of these services provided by the County under a contract arrangement. In addition, several entities of the government of California have jurisdiction conterminous with San Diego County, such as the San Diego Superior Court.

The county motto is "The noblest motive is the public good." County government offices are housed in the historic County Administration Center building, constructed from 1935 to 1938 with funding from the Works Progress Administration.

== Organization ==
=== Board of Supervisors ===
The San Diego County Board of Supervisors is the legislative and executive branch of the county government of San Diego County, California. Though officially nonpartisan, three Democrats and two Republicans currently comprise the Board of Supervisors.

=== Elected officers ===
In addition to the Board of Supervisors, there are several elected officers that form the government of San Diego County that are required by the California Constitution and California law, and authorized under the Charter.

The San Diego County Sheriff's Office provides general-service law enforcement to unincorporated areas of the county, serving as the equivalent of the county police for unincorporated areas of the county, and as incorporated cities within the county which have contracted with the agency for law-enforcement services (known as "contract cities"). The Sheriff's Department is also responsible for the county jails, courthouses, and specialized countywide services such as search and rescue, SWAT, etc.

The San Diego County District Attorney prosecutes felony and misdemeanor crimes that occur within the jurisdiction of San Diego County.

The San Diego County Assessor/Recorder/County Clerk is also an elected officer. As county assessor, they are responsible for real estate appraisals for tax purposes (assessments), as county recorder they are responsible for accepting and recording legal instruments such as birth, marriage and death records, and as county clerk they are responsible for issuing marriage licenses and performing civil marriage ceremonies, and registering fictitious business name statements, notaries public, process servers and professional photocopiers.

The San Diego County Board of Education is composed of five members elected from trustee areas. It maintains the policies for governance of the San Diego County Office of Education (SDCOE) and appoints the San Diego County Superintendent of Schools.

=== Other agencies ===
The Chief Administrative Officer assists the Board of Supervisors in handling the mounting administrative details of the County and is responsible for making recommendations to the Board.

The San Diego County Library is the county library.

The Probation Department is responsible for supervising convicted offenders in the community, either who are on probation, such as at the conclusion of their sentences, or while on community supervision orders.

The Health and Human Services Agency (HHSA) provides health and social services such as those county-administered programs related to welfare in California, such as Medi-Cal (Medicaid), CalFresh (food stamps), CalWORKs, and the Low Income Health Program (Obamacare).

The Department of Housing and Community Development (HCD) is the public housing authority through the Housing Authority of the County of San Diego (HACSD).

The Department of Public Works is responsible for county-maintained roads, traffic engineering, land development civil engineering review, design engineering and construction management, land surveying and map processing, cartographic services, watershed quality and flood protection, county airports, solid waste planning and diversion, inactive landfills, and wastewater systems management.

The County Parks and Recreation Department manages local and regional parks, campgrounds, 300 miles of trails, fishing lakes, state-of-the-art recreation centers and sports complexes, ecological preserves, and open space preserves. The San Diego County Parks and Recreation Department received the highest national recognition for park and recreation agencies in September. The Commission gave the San Diego County Parks and Recreation Department a perfect score for meeting all 154 national standards for strong management, high-quality service, and community engagement. The CAPRA presented the award at the National Recreation and Park Association's Best of the Best Ceremony. The Director of county parks and recreation, Jason Hemmens, said: "This recognition reflects our team's hard work, dedication, and passion. It shows our commitment to excellence, accountability, and continuous improvement." This shows that the department’s hard work has finally paid off.

The San Diego County Office of Education (SDCOE) is the county education department, and is operated by the San Diego County Superintendent of Schools, pursuant to the policies of the San Diego County Board of Education.

The San Diego County Public Defender provides indigent legal defense services.

San Diego County Animal Services operates animal shelters and animal control that cover unincorporated areas in San Diego County.

== Law ==
The San Diego County Code is the overarching codification of the local ordinances of the county passed by the Board of Supervisors, of which include the Administrative Code and the Code of Regulatory Ordinances. The San Diego County Administrative Code and the San Diego County Code of Regulatory Ordinances "establishes the duties, rules, regulations and systems of management of the various offices, departments and institutions of the County of San Diego" passed by the Board of Supervisors. Every act prohibited or declared unlawful, and every failure to perform an act required, by the ordinances are misdemeanor crimes, unless otherwise specified as infractions.

== Other governments ==
The San Diego Association of Governments (SANDAG) is an association of local San Diego County governments. The San Diego Local Agency Formation Commission (LAFCO) is subdivision of the State and regulates and plans local agency boundaries and service areas. LAFCO comprises 13 appointed elected officials including three members of the Board of Supervisors.

=== California ===
In the State Assembly, the 76th, 77th, 78th, 79th, and 80th districts are entirely within the county and parts of the 71st and 75th districts are within the county. In the State Senate, all of the 39th district and parts of the 36th, 38th and 40th districts are within the county.

San Diego County is represented by the Third District in the State Board of Equalization.

The San Diego Superior Court, which covers the entire county, is not a County department but a division of the State's trial court system. Historically, the courthouses were county-owned buildings that were maintained at county expense, which created significant friction since the trial court judges, as officials of the state government, had to lobby the county Board of Supervisors for facility renovations and upgrades. In turn, the state judiciary successfully persuaded the state Legislature to authorize the transfer of all courthouses to the state government in 2008 and 2009 (so that judges would have direct control over their own courthouses). Courthouse security is still provided by the county government under a contract with the state.

Richard J. Donovan Correctional Facility is a California state prison of the California Department of Corrections and Rehabilitation within an unincorporated area in the county.

=== San Diego ===
The government of San Diego consists principally of a mayor and a nine-member city council. In 2006, the city's form of government changed from a "city manager system" to a "strong mayor system". The change was brought about by a citywide vote in 2004. The mayor is in effect the chief executive officer of the city, while the council is the legislative body.

The members of the city council are each elected from single member districts within the city. The mayor and city attorney are elected directly by the voters of the entire city. The mayor, city attorney, and council members are elected to four-year terms, with a two-term limit. Elections are held on a non-partisan basis per California state law; nevertheless, most officeholders do identify themselves as either Democrats or Republicans.

In 2015, registered Democrats outnumbered Republicans by about 39% to 26% the city, and Democrats currently hold an 8-1 majority in the City Council.

=== Special districts ===
The San Diego Local Agency Formation Commission (SDLAFCo) is the Local Agency Formation Commission (LAFCo) for San Diego County and regulates special districts within its jurisdiction.

The San Diego Metropolitan Transit System (MTS or SDMTS) is the public transit provider for Central, South, Northeast and Southeast San Diego County and is governed by a fifteen-member Board of Directors chosen by its constituent joint powers authority city councils and the Board of Supervisors. The North County Transit District (NCTD) is the public transit provider for North San Diego County and is governed by a twelve-member Board of Directors composed of one representative from each incorporated city in the District plus the fifth district county supervisor.

The Beach Cities Health District and Palomar Health are examples of public health districts in San Diego County. Areas of the city immediately adjacent to San Diego Bay ("tidelands") are under the jurisdiction of the Port of San Diego.

=== Political parties ===
Per California state law, each political party recognized by the State of California has the right to form a central committee in each county; the central committee functions as a unit of the state political party. The composition of the central committee is determined by the bylaws of each county party as allowed by state law.

Major party central committees include the San Diego County Democratic Party Central Committee and the Republican Party of San Diego County Central Committee. Other party organizations include the San Diego Libertarian Party, the San Diego County Peace and Freedom Party, and the Green Party of San Diego County.

For the San Diego County Democratic Party Central Committee and the Republican Party of San Diego County Central Committee, six elected members from each California State Assembly district contained within San Diego County are chosen by registered party voters during the primary election in even-numbered years. If the number of candidates nominated for election does not exceed the number of candidates to be elected, the candidates are not listed on the ballots, but are instead declared elected by the Board of Supervisors. Democratic central committee members may include party officials, elected officials, recent candidates, appointed members, and elected members. The Republican central committee consists of the elected members, plus appointed members and Republican elected office holders as ex-officio members, not to exceed a total of 75 members.

== Elections ==
Elections for federal, state, and local offices are administered by California's counties, including by the San Diego County Registrar of Voters. Local elections receive less attention than state or national elections but are also important.

Voter turnout refers to the percentage of voters who actually participated in an election. It is a measure of civic participation which determines the health of an electoral process. Voter turnout is built on three main ideas: Turnout signals the strength of democracy, registration rules shape turnout, and competitive elections boost participation. It is usually calculated as a ratio. The numerator is the number of votes that are cast in an election and the denominator can be various options. The first variable can be the voting age population which accounts for anyone that is over the legal voting age (18). The second can be the voting eligible population which accounts for all citizens eligible to vote. The third option can be registered voters, which accounts for all voters that have registered to vote.

=== Voter turnout in San Diego County ===
==== 2024 Presidential general election ====
The 2024 United States presidential election was held on November 5, 2024. The candidates were Republican Donald Trump and Democrat Kamala Harris. The voter turnout in San Diego County was 75.8% according to the official election results from the San Diego Registrar of Voters.

| | Registered voters | Turnout |
|---|---|---|
| Total registration and turnout | 1,983,767 | 1,503,018 |
| Mail | | 1,275,304 |
| Vote Centers | | 227,714 |

===== 2025 San Diego County Board of Supervisors Special Election =====
The 2025 San Diego County Board of Supervisors Special Election was held on July 1, 2025. It occurred due to Nora Vargas resigning the 1st Supervisional District seat on the San Diego County Board of Supervisors. The voter turnout for the primary and the official election were as follows.

====== First Supervisorial District Special Primary ======
April 8, 2025, official results:

| | Registered voters | Turnout |
|---|---|---|
| Total registration and turnout | 373,641 | 66,626 |
| Mail | | 64,726 |
| Voter centers | | 1,900 |

The voter turnout was 17.8%.

July 1, 2025, official election results:

| | Registered voters | Turnout |
|---|---|---|
| Total registration and turnout | 370,801 | 78,132 |
| Mail | | 75,597 |
| Voter centers | | 2,535 |

The voter turnout was 21.1%.

The candidates were Paloma Aguirre, the Democratic mayor of Imperial Beach and John McCann, the Republican mayor of Chula Vista. Paloma Aguirre won the race with a percentage of 53.90. The voter turnout for each candidate was:

| Paloma Aguirre | 42,026 | 53.90% |
| John McCann | 35,943 | 46.10% |
| Total | 77,969 | |

====== 2025 California Proposition 50 ======
A special election was called in order to pass Proposition 50 on November 4, 2025. The election was called by California's governor, Gavin Newsom in response to the redistricting of congressional maps in Texas. Proposition 50 asked for the approval of the redistricting of congressional maps starting in 2026 through 2030.

The voter turnout for Proposition 50 in San Diego was 52.2%.

| | Registered voters | Turnout |
|---|---|---|
| Total registration and turnout | 2,023,379 | 1,056,873 |
| Mail | | 985,008 |
| Voter centers | | 71,865 |

Out of 1754 precincts reported, Proposition 50 passed:

| YES | 646,358 | 61.20% |
| NO | 409,781 | 38.80% |
