= San Diego County Public Defender =

Government legal aid agency of San Diego, California

Coordinates: 33.02°N 116.77°W

San Diego County Public Defender’s Office
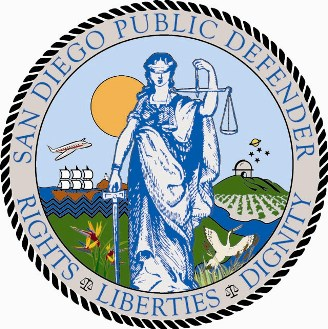
- Seal of the Public Defender — County of San Diego

Office overview
- Formed: 1988
- Jurisdiction: Government of San Diego County
- Headquarters: Administrative Office; 450 B Street, Suite 1100; San Diego, California, 92101
- Office executive: Paul Rodriguez, Public Defender
- Website: Public Defender’s Office website

The San Diego County Public Defender's office is an agency of the government of San Diego County, California. It provides legal assistance to individuals charged with a crime in state court who are financially unable to retain private counsel. The office consists of the Primary Public Defender, the Alternate Public Defender, the Office of Assigned Counsel & the Multiple Conflicts Office. Mental health and juvenile court matters are handled by special units within the divisions.

Courts within their jurisdiction include the San Diego Superior Court, the California Court of Appeal for the Fourth District, and the Supreme Court of California. The San Diego County District Attorney and the San Diego City Attorney prosecute alleged felony and misdemeanor violations of California state law that occur within the jurisdiction of San Diego County. Alleged federal law violations by indigent defendants are defended by the Federal Defenders of San Diego Inc.

== History ==
The San Diego County Public Defender's Office was established in 1988 by a San Diego County resolution. The Alternate Public Defender was established by the Board of Supervisors in 1990. In 2005, the Multiple Conflicts Office - Major Cases (MCO) was created to represent people who are charged with complicated and serious cases throughout San Diego County and who are financially unable to retain private counsel. In 2009, the County of San Diego consolidated separate indigent defense offices—Public Defender, Alternate Public Defender, Office of Assigned Counsel, Juvenile Delinquency & Multiple Conflict Office—into one office. The office formed a Public Defender Community Outreach Program that strives to connect with partners in San Diego communities to enrich the lives of those less fortunate and assist in securing equal access to justice.

In 1994, San Diego County Public Defenders Kathleen Coyne and Susan Clemens were awarded Public Defender of the Year by the California Public Defender's Association for their work defending Dale Akiki in the Faith Chapel Church ritual abuse case. Several San Diego County Public Defenders have gone on to become judges in California Superior Court.

In 2014, the office filed over 5,000 petitions—after Proposition 47 (2014)—to have felony convictions and sentences reduced.

== Primary Public Defender ==
The San Diego County Primary Public Defender (PPD) provides the majority of indigent defense services in San Diego County. The Primary Public Defender has five offices in the county: downtown San Diego, Vista (North County), Chula Vista (South Bay), El Cajon (East County), and a Juvenile Office.

== Discrimination Cases ==
The office has faced multiple cases of discrimination, harassment, retaliation, and unethical conduct. Most recently the office settled two such cases for 3.8 million dollars.

== Alternate Public Defender ==
The APD is responsible for defending those cases where the Primary Public Defender has a conflict of interest or is unable to defend the individual for various reasons. The Office of the Alternate Public Defender has two divisions. The Adult Criminal Division—operating out of all APD locations—represents indigent persons accused of a crime. The Juvenile Delinquency Division—out of Kearny Mesa—represents minors accused of truancy or criminal offenses. The Alternate Public Defender maintains offices in downtown San Diego, El Cajon, South Bay, Vista, and Kearny Mesa.

== Multiple Conflicts Office - Major Cases ==
The Multiple Conflicts Office - Major Cases (MCO) accepts court appointments that the Public Defender and the Alternate Public Defender are unable to accept due to a conflict of interest or other order of the court. MCO represents people who are charged with only the most complicated and serious cases throughout San Diego County. MCO attorneys possess many years of experience and training for the most serious types of criminal cases. The MCO is an independent and ethically separate division of the Department of the Public Defender and does not share client information or otherwise interact with attorneys from other divisions on the same case.

== Office of Assigned Counsel ==
If a court finds that the PPD and APD have a conflict of interest, then Office of Assigned Counsel (OAC) will provide the indigent defendant with a private practitioner who has been pre-screened and placed on a panel managed by the OAC.

== See also ==
- California Courts of Appeal (Fourth District, Division 1)
- California Department of Corrections and Rehabilitation
- California Superior Court
- California Supreme Court
- Chula Vista Police Department
- El Cajon Police Department
- Richard J. Donovan Correctional Facility
- San Diego County District Attorney
- San Diego County, California Probation
- San Diego County Sheriff's Department
- San Diego Police Department
