= Washington School House =

Coordinates: 39.264°N 121.018°W

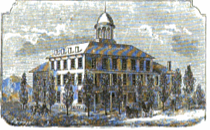
Washington School House (1886)

Washington School House was a public school in Nevada City, California, US. It was dedicated in 1869 on George Washington's birthday. The property fronted on Church street, and extended from Pine to Main streets.

== History ==
Construction commenced on September 1, 1868. The structure was fully completed by the contractors and ready for use and occupation in May 1869. The entire cost of the building, which was erected by contract, together with its appurtenances, fencing, etc., amounted to the sum of US$15,000. There were accommodations for the five hundred and twenty pupils and their teachers. The necessary funds for the purchase of the ground and erection of the building were raised by a special tax of one per cent, levied for the year 1868, and 90 cents for the ensuing year. John Isaiah Caldwell and A. B. Gregory, who constituted the Board, are credited with originating the enterprise and carrying it out to a speedy completion. The contractors for the work were Mcllvaine and Palmer, of Nevada City, who executed the same in accordance with the plans and specifications of the architect, William Craine, of San Francisco.

The Nevada City Elementary School was constructed on the old Washington School lot and opened in the fall of 1937. The lot is now occupied by Trinity Episcopal Church.

== Architecture and fittings ==
The building, set upon a solid granite foundation, formed a square, 95.25 by 58.3 feet (29.03 m × 17.77 m). It contained two stories, the first of which, 15 feet (4.6 m) in height, contained four class rooms, 28 by 34 feet (8.5 m × 10.4 m), and four wardrobe rooms, 6 by 20.5 feet (1.8 m × 6.2 m) each, with a hall 11.25 feet (3.43 m) in width, from which two stairways communicated with the second story, which contained two class rooms, 28 by 34 feet (8.5 m × 10.4 m), and two wardrobe rooms, 6 by 20.5 feet (1.8 m × 6.2 m) each, and also an assembly hall, 56 by 56 feet (17 m × 17 m), for school examinations and exhibitions. The front and rear doorways were placed in projections in the centre of the building, each 3 by 25.5 feet (0.91 m × 7.77 m), affording ingress and egress. The entire interior was lighted and ventilated. There were a series of metallic ventilating registers, placed near the floor, which brought in fresh air. There were ventilators near the ceiling, and louvre windows at the base of the cupola. A bell, weighing 350 pounds, was cast in San Francisco.

== Grounds ==
The lot, which cost US$3,000, measured two acres.
