= Summer Stephan =

San Diego County District Attorney

San Diego County District Attorney
- Incumbent
- Assumed office 2017
- Preceded by: Bonnie Dumanis

Personal details
- Party: Independent (2019–present); Republican (until 2019)
- Education: University of California, Davis (BA); University of the Pacific (JD)
- Occupation: Attorney
- Website: Official website

Summer Stephan is an American attorney serving as the San Diego County District Attorney since 2017. Stephan was initially appointed to the position of district attorney in 2017 following the resignation of Bonnie Dumanis, whom she served as Chief Deputy under. She defeated challenger Geneviéve Jones-Wright, a Democrat, in the 2018 general election, with 63.7 percent of the vote. She is the second female district attorney for San Diego.

== Early life and education ==
Summer received her Bachelor of Arts degree from the University of California, Davis, and her Juris Doctor from the University of the Pacific, McGeorge School of Law.

== Career ==
Stephan served as a deputy district attorney in San Diego County for 28 years, trying more than 100 jury cases. Stephan served as Chief of the District Attorney's North County Branch as well as Chief of the Sex Crimes and Human Trafficking Division. From 2012 to 2017, she served as Chief Deputy District Attorney under her predecessor, Bonnie Dumanis, who upon her retirement appointed Stephen directly to her position as interim district attorney in 2017.

In her successful campaign for district attorney in 2018, Stephan's campaign created a website that accused Stephan's opponent of being supported by Jewish philanthropist George Soros. When local San Diego media questioned Stephan about the alleged anti-semitic connotations of her attack website, Stephan walked away from reporters and had her security block them from asking her questions. It was widely publicized that George Soros Funded several DA's campaigns including Stephans opponent Genevieve Jones-Wright.

A life-long Republican, DA Stephan joined some other local politicians in quitting the party in 2019. In an interview, Stephan said her decision to re-register to “no party preference” was a professional one and declined to give her views on the Republican Party or the president. “I don’t want to opine about politics because that’s exactly what I’m trying to get away from,” she said in an interview.

Stephan was reelected in 2022, running unopposed.

== See also ==
- List of district attorneys by county
- List of California district attorneys
