= Sophie Godin-Beekmann =

French atmospheric scientist

Sophie Godin-Beekmann is a French atmospheric scientist whose research has used ground- and air-based lidar to monitor the chemical makeup of the atmosphere, and studied the connections between human activities, atmospheric ozone, and climate change. She is a director of research for the French National Centre for Scientific Research (CNRS), director of the Institut Pierre Simon Laplace, and former president of the International Ozone Commission (IO3C).

== Education and career ==
Godin-Beekmann received her doctorate in 1986 through Pierre and Marie Curie University, with the dissertation Etude experimentale par teledetection laser et modelisation de la distribution verticale d'ozone dans la haute stratosphere [Experimental study using laser remote sensing and modeling of the vertical ozone distribution in the upper stratosphere] directed by Gérard Mégie.

After postdoctoral research at the Jet Propulsion Laboratory in California, she became a researcher for the CNRS in 1989. She was promoted to director of research in 2005 and to director of research 1st class in 2011. From 2012 to 2017 she directed the Versailles Saint-Quentin-en-Yvelines Observatory; she became deputy director of the CNRS National Institute of Sciences of the Universe in 2018, and director of the Institut Pierre Simon Laplace in 2023. She was president of IO3C from 2021 to 2024.

== Recognition ==
Godin-Beekmann was elected as a Fellow of the International Union of Geodesy and Geophysics in 2015, and elected to Academia Europaea in 2019. She was named as a knight in the Ordre national du Mérite in 2023.
