= Allen v. City of Oakland =

Lawsuit against the Oakland Police Department

- Court: United States District Court for the Northern District of California
- Full case name: Delphine Allen et al v. City of Oakland
- Docket nos.: 3:00-cv-04599; 3:02-cv-04935

Court membership
- Judge sitting: Thelton Henderson

Keywords
- 42:1983 Civil Rights Act

Delphine Allen et al. v. City of Oakland (also known as the Riders Case or Riders Scandal) was a civil rights lawsuit in Federal District Court regarding police misconduct in Oakland, California which has resulted in ongoing Federal oversight. Plaintiffs alleged mistreatment at the hands of four veteran officers, known as the "Riders", who were alleged to have kidnapped, planted evidence, and beaten citizens. Plaintiffs also alleged that the Oakland Police Department (OPD) turned a blind eye to police misconduct.

The plaintiffs were represented by the Law Offices of John Burris and the Law Offices of James B. Chanin. Ms. Julie Houk, Mr. Chanin's associate, also played a major role in the litigation that has lasted for nearly fourteen years.

In 2003, the parties entered into a settlement. Part of that settlement saw a $10.9 million payout to the 119 plaintiffs. Additionally, the Oakland Police Department was required to comply with a series of reforms. An independent monitoring team was appointed by the court to ensure the police complied with the settlement. As of September 29, 2026,u federal monitoring of the Oakland Police Department ended after 23 years, closing the longest-running oversight of a police department in U.S. history.

== Background ==
"The Riders" refer to four officers in the Oakland Police Department. The Washington Post described them:

At the high point of their careers, the so-called "Riders" were considered the best and the brightest, veterans whom rookie police officers tried to emulate. Their specialty: bringing in reputed drug dealers in record numbers from the crime-plagued streets of West Oakland.

On July 5, 2000, Keith Batt resigned and reported his former co-workers' activities to the police department's Internal Affairs Division, approximately one month after graduating from the police academy. Afterwards, a string of incidents of police misconduct by the group of four Oakland PD officers known as "the Oakland Riders" became publicly revealed, with Alameda County District Attorney Tom Orloff filing criminal charges on November 1, 2000. 119 people pressed civil rights lawsuits for unlawful beatings and detention, ultimately settling for $11 million with an agreement that the Oakland Police Department would implement significant reforms. Although all of the police officers involved were fired, three were later acquitted of criminal charges while one fled, presumably to Mexico, to avoid prosecution.

== Lawsuit ==
On 17 December 2000, Delphine Allen filed suit against the city. His case was ultimately consolidated along with other similar civil rights lawsuits against Oakland and its police, including a total of 119 different plaintiffs.

In 2003, the city entered into a negotiated settlement agreement. As part of the settlement, the city agreed to pay nearly $11 million to the 119 plaintiffs.

== Negotiated settlement ==
The parties negotiated the largest legal settlement in Oakland municipal history and on March 14, 2003, the district court approved the negotiated settlement agreement.

The settlement brought major changes to police department operations and dealings with the public. The case riveted the city as it was the largest case of police misconduct in Oakland in decades. Despite the settlement's hefty price tag, Russo said the cases could have cost the city tens of millions of dollars more had they gone to trial, pointing out that the victims had spent more than 25 years, combined, imprisoned on false charges. By comparison, Los Angeles spent $40 million to settle litigation stemming from the Rampart corruption scandal.

The payout went to 119 plaintiffs who filed federal civil rights lawsuits claiming four police officers kidnapped, beat and planted drugs on them during the summer of 2000. The plaintiffs alleged that the Oakland Police Department either encouraged or turned a blind eye to the abuse. U.S. District Court Judge Thelton Henderson approved the settlement in the civil cases after 18 months of negotiations.

== Post-settlement action ==
On August 20, 2003, the District Court appointed an independent monitoring team; Rachel Burgess, Kelli Evans, Charles Gruber and Christy Lopez to oversee the reform process and ensure city compliance with the settlement agreement. In January 2010, a monitoring team led by Robert Warshaw was appointed to replace the team that was appointed in August 2003.

A Jan 17, 2012, a report by the independent monitoring team found "no improvement in compliance" during the past quarter. In a January 24, 2012, ruling, the district court found that Oakland Police Department had still failed to comply with the terms of the settlement.

On October 4, 2012, Plaintiffs' counsel filed a motion requesting that the Oakland Police Department be placed in receivership. The OPD requested more time to achieve compliance.

Plaintiffs' motion ultimately led to a settlement by the parties, who agreed to the Court's appointment of a Compliance Director who would have broad ranging powers, including the power "to review, investigate and take correction action regarding Oakland Police Department policies, procedures, and practices that are related to the objectives of the Negotiated Settlement Agreement (NSA) and Amended Memorandum of Understanding (AMOU), even if such policies, procedures, or practices do not fall squarely within any specific NSA task." The Compliance Director was also given the power to remove the Chief of Police, and to demote the Assistant Chief or any of the Deputy Chiefs.

The December 12, 2012, Order settling the Plaintiffs' motion also called for the OPD "to address, resolve, and reduce: (1) incidents involving the unjustified use of force, including those involving the drawing and pointing of a firearm at a person or an officer-involved shooting (2) incidents of racial profiling and bias-based policing (3) citizen complaints (4) high-speed pursuits".

On 10 June 2016, Oakland mayor Libby Schaaf announced the resignation of Oakland PD Chief Sean Whent. Reporters from the East Bay Express reported that Robert Warshaw forced Whent to resign due to the role of Whent (and his wife) in the coverup of a sexual-misconduct scandal involving Oakland police officers (as well as personnel from multiple other agencies) and a minor girl. The reporters also suspect that Whent was motivated by a desire to prevent another scandal from preventing the termination of federal oversight of the department.

== Related legal issues ==
Keith Batt, the rookie who first reported the misconduct, ultimately settled with the city for $625,000.

In total, the City of Oakland has paid a total of $57 million during the 2001-2011 timeframe to alleged victims of police abuse—the largest sum of any city in the San Francisco Bay Area.

=== Criminal proceedings ===
In November 2000, Alameda county prosecutors filed charges against four members of the Oakland Police Department. One officer, Francisco "Frank" Vazquez, the alleged ringleader, became a fugitive and was not brought to trial. As of 2023, he is still missing and is currently wanted by the FBI.

The other three charged officers did stand trial and two juries failed to convict them. Opening arguments for the first criminal trial began in September 2002. In September 2003, after the longest criminal trial in county history, a jury deadlocked on 27 counts and a mistrial was declared.

The second criminal trial began in November 2004. In May 2005, a jury found officer Matthew Hornung not guilty of all charges.

After two mistrials, the judge dismissed the remaining charges against the two remaining officers.
