= Bonnie Dumanis =

American lawyer (born 1951)

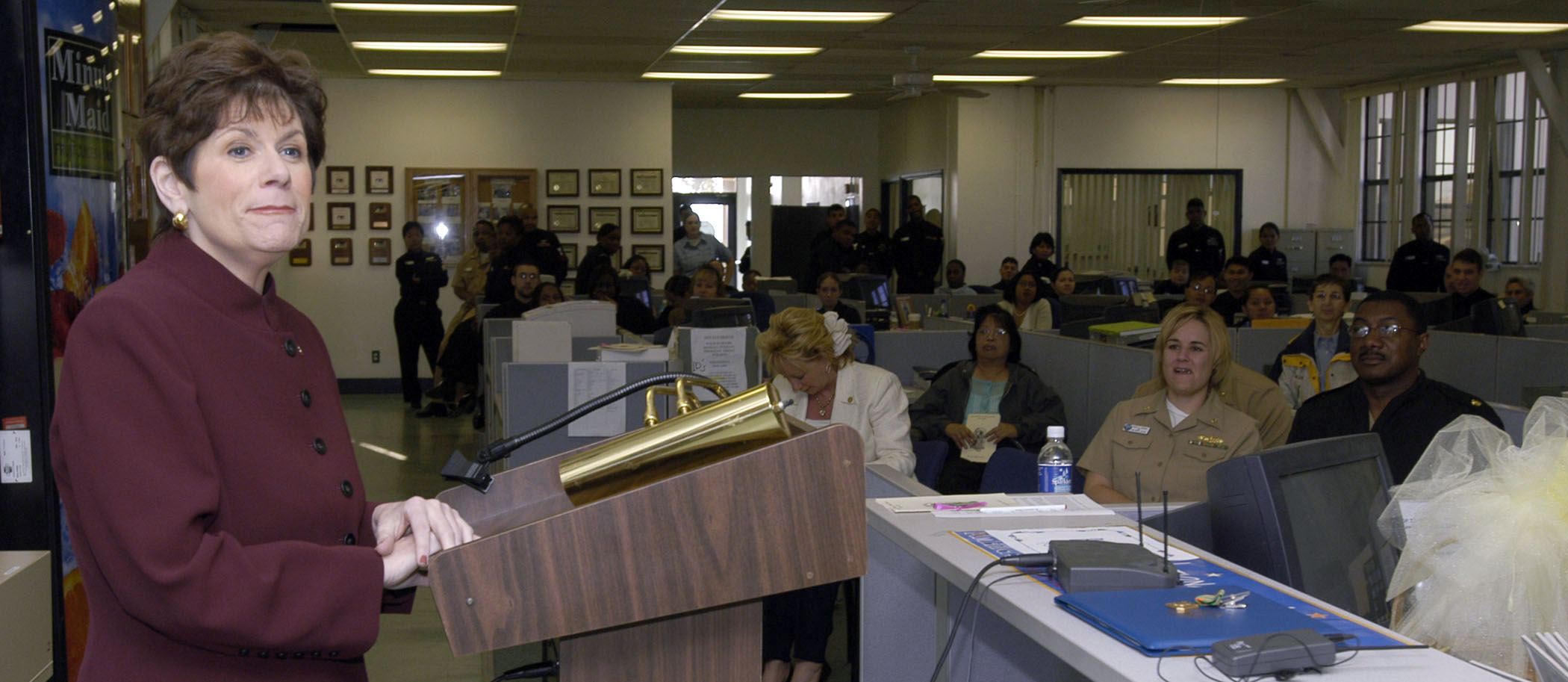

San Diego County District Attorney
- In office 2003–2017
- Preceded by: Paul Pfingst
- Succeeded by: Summer Stephan

Personal details
- Born: Bonnie Michelle Dumanis; December 16, 1951 (age 74) Brockton, Massachusetts, U.S.
- Party: Republican
- Education: University of Massachusetts Amherst (BA); Western State University College of Law (JD)
- Occupation: Attorney
- Website: Official website

Bonnie Michelle Dumanis (born December 16, 1951) is an American attorney and former San Diego County District Attorney. She held the office from 2003 to 2017. Dumanis is a Republican, though the office she held was officially nonpartisan. She was the first openly gay or lesbian district attorney in the country. She was the first woman and the first Jewish district attorney in San Diego.

== Early life and education ==
Dumanis grew up in Brockton, Massachusetts, the daughter of Ann and Abraham "Abe" Dumanis. Her father was a truck driver as well as a professional musician; her mother worked for a government program assisting women and children. Dumanis received a Bachelor of Arts in sociology from the University of Massachusetts Amherst. She received her Juris Doctor (J.D.) degree from Western State University College of Law (now Thomas Jefferson School of Law) in 1976, and was admitted to the bar in 1977.

== Career ==
Her first job was as a junior typist in San Diego County while she studied law at night. Following her admission to the State Bar of California, she served as a deputy district attorney from 1978 to 1990.

In 1994, she was elected to the Municipal Court where she served for four years and started the first Drug Courts in San Diego. In 1998, she was elected to the San Diego Superior Court where she started the Domestic Violence Court program to reduce recurrences by perpetrators.

In 2002 she ran for district attorney and defeated incumbent Paul Pfingst. She ran for re-election unopposed in 2006 and 2010. She faced two challengers when she ran for a fourth term in 2014, but won re-election in the June primary, getting 55% of the vote.

In 2012, Dumanis ran for mayor of San Diego in the 2012 election, did not advance from the primary election, and later endorsed Carl DeMaio in the general election.

In 2006 she campaigned for California Proposition 83 (2006), California's version of Jessica's Law, which restricts where paroled sex offenders can live and requires them to wear tracking devices.

In January 2017 she said she would not run for a fifth term when her current term expires in 2018. In April 2017 she announced her intention to resign her office effective July 7. In 2018 she ran for a seat on the San Diego County Board of Supervisors, but lost to former state Assemblyman Nathan Fletcher.

== Selected cases ==
=== D.C. v. Heller ===
Dumanis filed an amicus curiae brief in the case D.C. v. Heller, supporting the District of Columbia's ban on keeping functional firearms in the home for self-defense, and on the possession of handguns.

=== Cynthia Sommer ===
In April 2008, a woman accused and convicted by Dumanis's office of murder, was released, after over two years of incarceration. Cynthia Sommer was convicted of fatally poisoning her Miramar Marine husband with arsenic. Charges were dropped on reasonable doubt after conclusions reached by toxicology experts during a review, prompted by the defense, of the evidence used for trial and conviction. Dumanis said her office acted based on available evidence when it charged Sommer with murder in March 2006 and tried her in January 2007.

=== Marijuana prosecutions ===
In February 2009, the district attorney's office filed charges against 33 individuals charged in a drug investigation called Endless Summer. In a press conference for the operation, Dumanis said the investigation was to protect military housing. After further investigation it was revealed that 14 of those arrested are medical marijuana patients who were the initial target of the investigation named Green RX. Most of those charged were shown not to have any ties to the military, as initially claimed by Dumanis' office. Since that time at least two of the 14 medical marijuana defendants have been acquitted by juries; jurors said the law was unclear or ambiguous. One of those defendants was acquitted in 2009 and tried a second time in 2010 based on a different raid; he was convicted but the conviction was overturned. In October 2013 Dumanis' office took him to trial a third time in San Diego Superior Court. The case has been described as "a symbol of the effort by Dumanis and other prosecutors across the state to criminalize storefront medical marijuana dispensaries".

== Recognition ==
In 2008, Dumanis was inducted into the Women's Museum of California's Hall of Fame honoring her career and achievements.

In 2013 the Log Cabin Republican Club of San Diego named her "Woman of the Year".

== Controversies ==
=== Illegal donations ===
Dumanis ran to become the mayor of San Diego in 2012 and lost. Not long after, Dumanis was accused of accepting illegal donations. She testified in a federal court trial for José Susumo Azano Matsura, a wealthy Mexican businessman, who was charged with making $600,000 in illegal political donations. Although it is illegal for foreign nationals to make donations to U.S. political campaigns, he donated to officials including Dumanis and Bob Filner. Dumanis said under oath that she had believed Matsura was a U.S. citizen and barely knew him, having met him on only two occasions. Matsura claimed she knew he was a foreign citizen. Later, Matsura's attorney contended in a court filing that Dumanis had visited Matsura at his home, and that Matsura had told Dumanis in a meeting he only had a Mexican passport and a visa. When asked why she had accepted a contribution worth about $100,000 from Matsura just two months after the meetings, she said she hadn't known where the money came from at the time. It also was revealed that in September 2012, four months after the meetings, Dumanis wrote a letter of recommendation for Matsura's son (whom she had never met) to include in his application to the University of San Diego.

=== Gang prosecutions ===
In 2015, Dumanis was criticized for prosecuting a group of young black men for belonging to the same gang as suspects in a Lincoln Park shooting. Though Dumanis acknowledged some of the men had nothing to do with the crimes committed in the case, they faced life in prison due to rap lyrics and social media posts indicating they socialized with gang members. In 2018, Dumanis apologized for pursuing those prosecutions.

=== Pension "double-dipping" ===
Dumanis has been accused of taking two pensions at the same time and using her lawyers to influence 2017 pension law changes that would allow her to receive the salary for County Supervisor in addition to her current two pensions. She had previously fought to end guaranteed pensions in San Diego.

In 2015, while district attorney of San Diego, Dumanis began receiving a pension of $29,318/year (she was a judge in 1995–2003) in addition to her salary, and she received both pension and salary from January 2015 to July 2017. The practice of double-dipping pensions is largely banned in San Diego county, but as of 2018 after retiring from both jobs, Dumanis continues to receive both pensions for a total of about $298,400/year because they come from different pension systems.

Not long before Dumanis announced her intention to run for San Diego county supervisor in September 2017, there was a change in county laws regarding pensions. Under the new system, she would be allowed to take the county supervisor salary in addition to her current two pensions. In January 2018, it was reported in the San Diego Union-Tribune that Dumanis' lawyers had extensively lobbied pension officials to change the law, with more than 80 pages of exchanges between Dumanis' lawyers and pension officials throughout 2017. She paid the lawyers with campaign contributions for about $5,600 worth of services. Dumanis' lawyers also sent a memo confirming that the new legislation would allow a former official with a pension (like Dumanis) to also take a salary. This led to widespread speculation that Dumanis was planning to try to take the salary in addition to her two pensions.

Dumanis stated that the change of law had nothing to do with her. When asked why her lawyers had been so closely involved with the law change, Dumanis said they had sent a "strategy memo", and that she knew of five other people in government who received a salary and a pension at the same time. After the controversy, she pledged multiple times to forgo the $172,000 county supervisor salary if she won the seat.

=== Cannabis prosecutions ===
Dumanis opposed California Proposition 64 (which in 2016 legalized cannabis for adults) and has been characterized as tough on cannabis-related crimes. In May 2017, a SWAT team raided the San Diego home of medical marijuana lawyer Jessica McElfresh. Dumanis charged McElfresh with being an accessory to a crime due to her representation of a licensed cannabis manufacturer and distributor, after the owner of the clinic was accused of manufacturing a controlled substance. Dumanis also demanded to see records about McElfresh's other clients, which was criticized for possibly violating attorney-client privilege. Ultimately, the felony prosecution was dismissed in exchange for the attorney pleading guilty to an infraction, for which there was a $250.00 fine.

== See also ==
- List of district attorneys by county
- List of California district attorneys

Legal offices
Preceded by Paul Pfingst	San Diego County District Attorney; 2003–2017	Succeeded by Summer Stephan
