= John Isaiah Caldwell =

American lawyer

John Isaiah Caldwell (1816-1900) was an American attorney, miner, businessman, and school trustee. He came to California in 1849, and practiced law in the state throughout his residence of forty years. He was successful fiboth as a miner and attorney, and was at one time possessed of considerable wealth. But reverses of fortune and cessation of hydraulic mining had a negative affect on his financial situation.

== Early life and education ==
Caldwell was born at Urbana, Ohio, on May 25, 1816.

He received his legal education in his native state, being a student under Judge John A. Corwin, who was elected Chief Justice of Ohio in 1851, and was admitted to practice before the Supreme Court at Columbus, Ohio.

== Career ==
From there, he went to Lexington, Missouri, where he was likewise admitted to practice before the Supreme Court sitting in banc.

In 1850, Caldwell set out for California across the plains, arriving in Sacramento on August 12 of that year. The train of which he was a member, when it set out from Lexington, Missouri, consisted of twenty-three wagons. At Independence Rock, Caldwell left the train and packed alone over the mountains and into California, beating the company by sixty days and thus escaping the cholera, which at that time was raging fiercely along the emigrant road. For a time, he mined on the American River, near Folsom, California, but in October he set out for Nevada County, arriving first at Rough and Ready, then the most lively camp in the state. Here he remained during the ensuing winter, going in the early spring with a company of fifteen others to the North Yuba River, where they located a mining claim, calling it the Missouri Bar. On July 3, 1851, having completed their dam, they proceeded to prospect the claim, and found it would pay well. Caldwell continued there until late in November of that year. and then sold out and went back to Missouri by way of Panama.

In the spring of 1854, he returned once more to California, coming via New Orleans and the Nicaragua route. He went at once to Nevada City, arriving there June 23, 1854, and at once "hung out his shingle" and began the successful practice of his profession. In December 1854, Caldwell was admitted as an attorney at law in the Supreme Court of California in Sacramento, and thus was one of the older practitioners of the state. He was counsel also in some of the most prominent cases in Nevada County. In 1869, he was elected District Attorney, taking the office in 1870 and holding it for two years.

Caldwell was an active promoter of education. On March 25, 1874, by an act of the Legislature, the Board of Education for Nevada School District was created, having been approved by Governor Newton Booth; the act was drawn up, written and evolved by Caldwell. He encouraged by all means in his power the public schools of Nevada City, not only by his presence, but in aiding out of his private means and in other ways the erection of suitable buildings. The building now known as the Washington School House was planned and constructed while he was a trustee, being chiefly engineered by him and his co-trustees. They bought the lot, laid the foundation, and when the school funds were exhausted he, in company with other trustees, A. B. Gregory and E. G. Waite (the place of the latter being later filled by E. F. Spence), shouldered the expense of erecting the building, this being afterward refunded by the people of Nevada City. Caldwell continued to be a trustee for eight years, paying during that time out of his own pocket hundreds of dollars for poor people.

In 1867, while living in Nevada City, he served as Notary Public. He was interested in many mining operations, both quartz and placer, during his residence. Caldwell encouraged farming and fruit-raising wherever practicable in the county.

== Personal life ==
Caldwell never married.

He came to Humboldt County, California a little more than year before his death. John Isaiah Caldwell died December 25, 1900 a few miles from Ferndale, California.
