= David Minier =

American judge (born 1934)

Superior Court Judge Madera County
- In office 1991–2003

District Attorney Madera County
- In office 1976–1991

District Attorney Santa Barbara County
- In office 1967–1975

City Councilman Santa Maria, California
- In office 1961–1964

Personal details
- Born: October 1, 1934 (age 91) Ventura, California, U.S.
- Spouse: Wananda (Rickie) Minier
- Children: April; John; Greg Minier; Brett Minier
- Education: Princeton University; 1957; Stanford Law School; 1960; National Judicial College; The Judge Advocate General's Legal Center and School; Oxford University
- Occupation: City Councilman; District Attorney; Judge; Professor; Allan Hancock College; 1961-1966; 1975-1976; Fresno City College; 1977-1981; 1984-2004; Author
- Known for: 1969 Santa Barbara oil spill Gourgen Yanikian; 1976 Chowchilla kidnapping Minier v. CIA; The Ararat Illusion (2011); One Nation Under Obama’s... A Descent into Tyranny (2012); Rafiki (2015)

David Durfee Minier (born October 1, 1934) is an American retired politician who was a City Councilman, District Attorney of Santa Barbara County and Madera County, and California judge.

In a law career spanning nearly 60 years, David Minier defended, prosecuted, and presided over law cases in over half the counties in California and was a part time judge in Madera County.

== Early life and education ==
Minier was born on October 1, 1934, in Ventura, California. He graduated Princeton University with a B.A. in 1957 and graduated Stanford Law School in 1960. He has also studied at the National Judicial College, The Judge Advocate General's Legal Center and School, and Oxford University.

== Personal life ==
Minier traveled to over one hundred countries around the world. He climbed Mount Fuji and Mount Kilimanjaro and competed in police athletic events internationally. After retiring, he moved to Spring Hill, Tennessee.

== Career ==
Minier was a city councilman in Santa Maria from 1964 to 1966. Starting in 1967, Minier served as district attorney in Santa Barbara County, California, and went on to serve as DA of Madera County from 1976 to 1991. He was Judge of the Superior Court of Madera County from 1991 to 2003.

During his career, Minier was prosecutor in over 300 jury trials. He was DA in Santa Barbara County during the 1969 Santa Barbara oil spill, and the trial of Gourgen Yanikian in 1972, for the assassination of two Turkish consular officials. Minier blocked evidence of the Armenian genocide from the court, fearing that it would lead to jury nullification. He later regretted this decision.

Minier also prosecuted about 900 rioters during the 1970 riots in Isla Vista. In Madera County he prosecuted the defendants of the 1976 Chowchilla kidnapping. In 1994 Minier sued the CIA for withholding information on the assassination of John F. Kennedy.

Minier served as military attorney for the California State Military Reserve from 1983 to 2004, retired as Colonel. He was awarded the U.S. Army Commendation Medal and Order of California for his military service.

Minier taught criminal law classes at Allan Hancock College from 1961 to 1966 and 1975-1976, and at Fresno City College from 1977 to 1981 and 1984-2004.

Although formally retired, Minier continues to serve as an assigned judge in central California. He is also the author of three novels, The Ararat Illusion (2011), “One Nation Under Obama’s...A Descent into Tyranny” (2012) and Rafiki (2015).
