= Tom Orloff =

American lawyer

28th District Attorney of Alameda County
- In office 1994 – September 18, 2009
- Preceded by: Jack Meehan
- Succeeded by: Nancy O'Malley

Personal details
- Born: Pleasanton, California, U.S.
- Education: Occidental College (BA); University of California, Berkeley (JD)
- Profession: Lawyer

Thomas Jensen Orloff is an American attorney who served as the 28th District Attorney of Alameda County from 1994 to 2009.

== Biography ==
Orloff was born and raised Pleasanton, California. Orloff's family had various connections to the city, his grandfather having served as mayor and father as vice mayor. Orloff attended Occidental College in Los Angeles, California for his undergraduate studies before attending Boalt Hall for law school.

Orloff began work in the Alameda District Attorney's Office after graduating law school in 1970. As a deputy district attorney, he twice prosecuted Huey Newton for the 1974 murder of 17-year old prostitute Kathleen Smith, but both cases ended in mistrials. Following Newton's death in 1989, Orloff would describe him as "no more than a thug" who acted violently and abusively towards those around him. Orloff would try 25 murder cases before becoming Chief Assistant District Attorney in 1989.

When District Attorney Jack Meehan retired in 1994, he anointed Orloff as his successor and the Alameda County Board of Supervisors appointed him as the new District Attorney. Orloff then ran unopposed for the position, and was reelected in unopposed elections in 1998, 2002, and 2006. On September 8, 2009, Orloff announced his intention to retire. He retired on September 18, 2009.

Orloff's office found itself in the middle of controversy in early 2009 over its pending decision whether to charge a crime in the BART Police shooting of Oscar Grant. Though Orloff charged Johannes Mehserle with murder, some activists complained that he took too long to do so. Criminal law expert and Boalt Hall Law School Professor Franklin Zimring, however, called Orloff's office one of the "better departments" in the United States.

Orloff unsuccessfully prosecuted the Oakland Riders police abuse case, dropping charges after two mistrials from hung juries.
