= Ursula Jones Dickson =

American attorney and judge (born 1968)

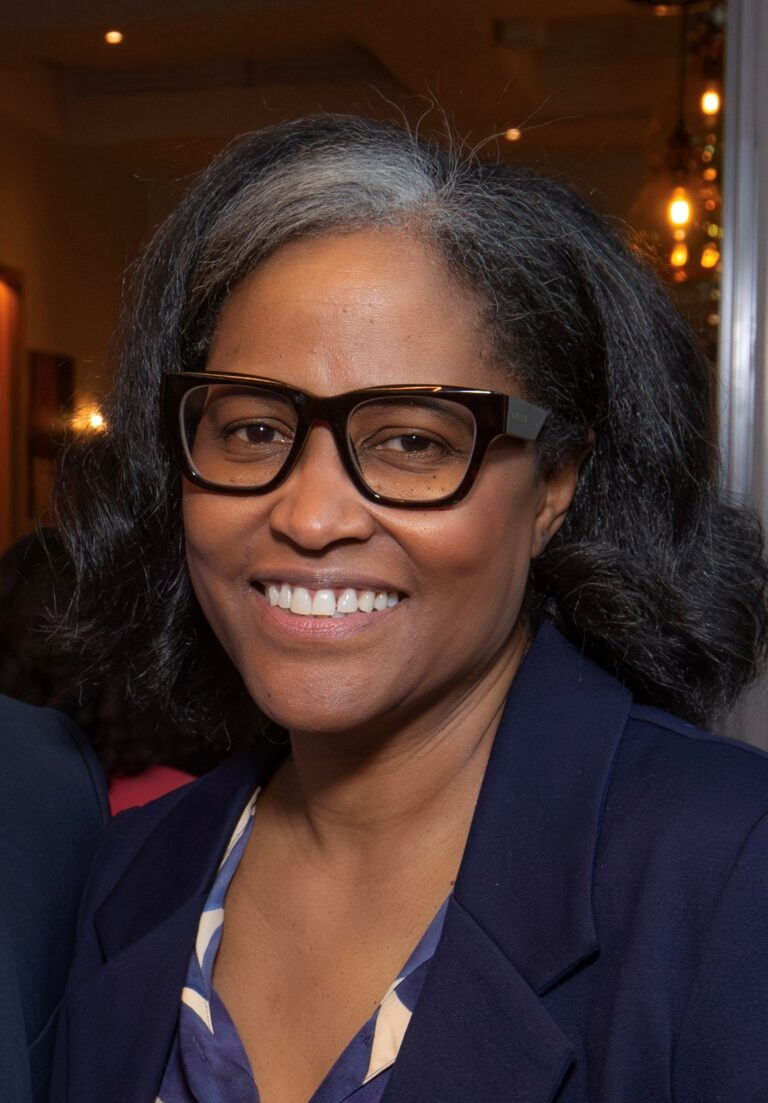
- Dickson in 2025

31st District Attorney of Alameda County
- Incumbent
- Assumed office February 18, 2025
- Preceded by: Pamela Price

Judge of the Alameda County Superior Court
- In office December 27, 2013 – February 14, 2025
- Appointed by: Jerry Brown
- Preceded by: Paul D. Seeman
- Succeeded by: Cara H. Sandberg

Personal details
- Born: Ursula Jones; 1968 (age 57–58)
- Party: Democratic
- Spouse: Joel Dickson
- Education: University of California, Berkeley (BA); University of San Francisco (JD)

Ursula Jones Dickson (born 1968) is an American attorney and judge who has served as the 31st district attorney of Alameda County since 2025. A member of the Democratic Party, she was appointed to the Alameda County Superior Court by Governor Jerry Brown in 2013 and served until 2025.

== Life and career ==
Jones Dickson was raised in Los Angeles and graduated from Phineas Banning High School in 1986. She received a bachelor of arts in sociology from the University of California, Berkeley in 1990. After a brief educational hiatus, she later received a juris doctor from the University of San Francisco School of Law in 1998. She has lived in Oakland since 2001.

Jones Dickson served as a deputy district attorney in the Alameda County District Attorney's Office from 1999 to 2013. In 2013, she was appointed to the Alameda County Superior Court by Governor Jerry Brown to fill the vacancy created by the resignation of Judge Paul D. Seeman. She was re-elected to her judgeship unopposed in 2016 and 2022. As a superior court judge, Jones Dickson has primarily presided over juvenile dependency cases and served as presiding judge of the court's Juvenile Dependency Division from 2019 to 2022.

== Alameda County District Attorney ==
In 2024, Alameda County district attorney Pamela Price was recalled. Price left office on December 5, and her chief assistant Royl Roberts took over as acting district attorney. On January 28, 2025, the Alameda County Board of Supervisors appointed Jones Dickson, assuming office on February 18, 2025.

In the first few months after her appointment, Jones Dickson reversed several of Price's previous policies. Jones Dickson reversed Price's directive of barring prosecutors from filing sentence enhancements unless they obtained supervisory approval. Jones Dickson also rehired 11 attorneys who had previously left under Price. Jones Dickson also halted Price's work reviewing death penalty cases, which had come under scrutiny because of evidence of racial discrimination in jury selection. Jones Dickson's team accused the former Price administration of not thoroughly reviewing cases before seeking resentencing. Brian Pomerantz, an attorney representing some of the men who have asked for reconsideration of their cases, said that Jones Dickson is sweeping wrongdoings of previous prosecutors under the rug.

In October of 2025, after an increase in Immigration and Custom Enforcement agents in Alameda County, Jones Dickson issued a statement saying “We will not provide immigration status information to the federal government, and we do not coordinate with ICE or participate in immigration activities,”

In June 2026, Jones Dickson was elected to serve the remaining two years of Price's original term, after defeating Price in the election.

One of Jones Dickson's promises when she was sworn in was to build trust by centering victims of crimes. She has held multiple listening sessions with business owners, victims' rights groups, and other community members.

== Personal life ==
Though her roles are officially nonpartisan, she is a registered Democrat.
