= Marie-Lise Chanin =

French physicist

- Born: 26 September 1934 (age 91); Angers, France
- Occupation: Director of Research Emerita at the French National Centre for Scientific Research (CNRS)

Marie-Lise Chanin (Marie-Lise, Paule, Andrée Lory; born 26 September 1934 in Angers) is a French geophysicist, aeronomist, director of research emerita at the French National Centre for Scientific Research (CNRS), and author of works on the physics of the upper and middle atmosphere.

== Biography ==
=== Training and activities ===
Marie-Lise Lory had planned to study at the Beaux-Arts but is studied natural sciencesː she took a bachelor's degree in mathematics, then studied physics (quantum optics). On the advice of Alfred Kastler and Jean Brossel she entered a laboratory created at the École normale supérieure, the Aeronomy Department. She gets married and has a son.

She obtained her licence de sciences in 1957, and her doctorate ès sciences in 1965. In 1959, she had joined the CNRS as a research trainee, where she spent her entire professional career until her academic retirement in 2000, having become research director in 1986.

She was elected a corresponding member of the French Academy of Sciences on 26 March 1990, in the Sciences of the Universe section. Throughout her career, she assumed many responsibilities member of the High Council of Meteorology, member of the Environment Committee of the French Academy of sciences (since 2005), French representative to the ICSU (International Council of Scientific Unions), member of the Scientific Council of the Centre for Unconventional Hydrocarbons, President of the French National Committee of Geodesy and Geophysics (1986–1990), among others.

She is also a member of the French Academy of Technologies, the Académie de l'Air et de l'Espace and the Academia Europaea.

== Awards ==
=== Decorations ===
Grand Officier of the Légion d'honneur. She was made a Chevalier on 26 September 1996, and was promoted to Officier on 31 December 2005, Commandeur on 29 March 2013, before being raised to the dignity of Grand Officier on 30 December 2017.

Grand Officier of the Ordre National du Mérite. She received the distinction of Grand Officier on 30 December 2017. She had been Commandeur since 28 November 2000.

=== Prizes ===
Her research has won several awards:

- Intercosmos Prize of the USSR Academy of Sciences (1974)
- CNRS silver medal (1983)
- Deslandres Prize of the French Academy of sciences (1988)
- Prize of the Laboratories of the French Academy of sciences (1996)
- Vermeil Medal of the National Academy of Air and Space (1999)
- Prize of the International Academy of Astronautics (2006)
- NASA Group Achievement Award to UARS Team (2006)

== Scientific Works ==
=== Research topics ===
Marie-Lise Chanin has devoted her research to the physics of the upper and middle atmosphere, which brought her to an interest in the destruction of ozone in the stratosphere and climate change. She first studied the upper atmosphere: her thesis (directed by Jacques Blamont) was devoted to the measurement of the temperature of the upper atmosphere. She used the optical resonance of alkaline atoms emitted into the atmosphere by rockets and her measurements revealed the influence of solar activity and particle precipitation. She then developed methods for probing the atmosphere by laser or lidar, which allow temperature measurements over distances of 10 to 100 km. She highlighted the cooling of the stratosphere under the influence of greenhouse gases. It clarified the role of the stratosphere on the climate and the influence of the air fleet on the environment.

=== Publications ===
She has published approximately 200 articles in peer-reviewed journals and has contributed to numerous reports.

French-language publications include ː

- Chanin, Marie-Lise (2008). L'école de l'espace: Le service d'aéronomie, 1958–2008: Histoire et science (in French). Paris: CNRS. ISBN 978-2-271-06776-0. LCCN 2009402314. OCLC 471013776. OL 24015666M.
- Chanin, Marie-Lise; Brasseur, Guy (2007). "Interation entre la chimie atmosphérique et le climat". In Fellous, Jean-Louis; Gautier, Catherine (eds.). Ensemble face aux changements climatiques (in French). Odille Jacob.
- Marie-Lise Chanin (December 1997). Impact de la flotte aérienne sur l'environnement et le climat. Rapport commun Académie des Sciences & Académie Nationale de l'Air & de l'Espace (in French). Vol. 40.
- André, Jean-Claude; Boucher, Olivier; Bousquet, Philippe; Chanin, Marie-Lise; Chappellaz, Jérôme; Tardieu, Bernard (2014). Le méthane: D'où vient-il et quel son impact sur le climat? (in French). EDP Sciences. ISBN 978-2-7598-1014-7.
- Chanin, Marie-Lise; Clerbaux, Cathy; Godin-Beekmann, Sophie (2015). L'évolution de l'ozone atmosphérique, le point en 2015 (in French). Tec & Doc Lavoisier. ISBN 978-2-7430-2107-8.
