= Pamela Price (California politician) =

American lawyer

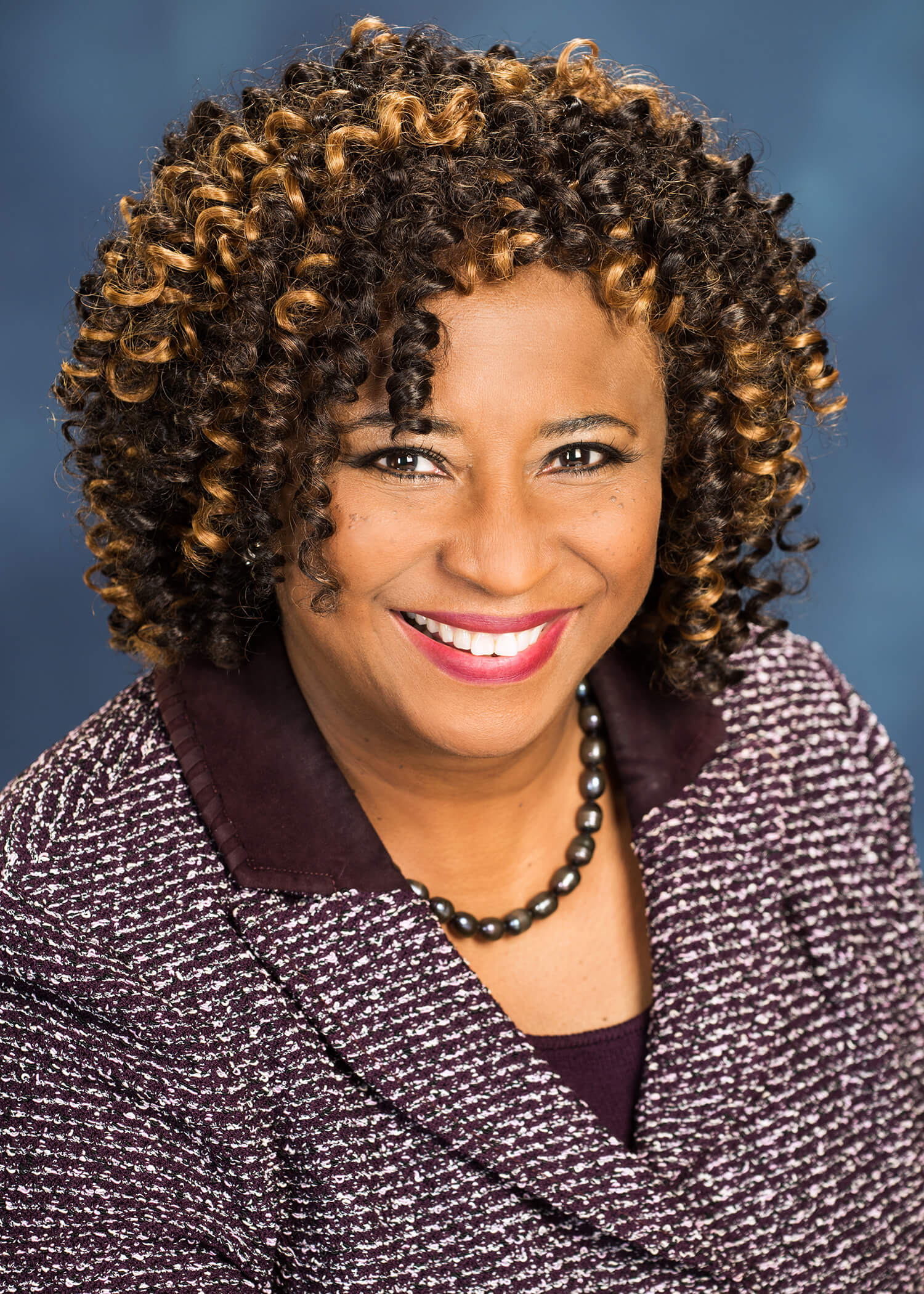
- Official portrait, 2023

30th District Attorney of Alameda County
- In office January 3, 2023 – December 5, 2024
- Preceded by: Nancy O'Malley
- Succeeded by: Ursula Jones Dickson

Personal details
- Born: Pamela Yvette Price; 1957 (age 68–69) Dayton, Ohio, U.S.
- Party: Democratic
- Education: Yale University (BA); University of California, Berkeley (MA, JD)

Pamela Yvette Price (born 1957) is an American attorney and civil rights activist who served as the 30th district attorney of Alameda County from 2023 to 2024. She is a member of the Democratic Party.

Price was recalled in 2024 with 62.9% of voters supporting the recall.

== Early life and education ==
An Ohio native, Price was born in Dayton in 1957 and raised in Cincinnati. She was inspired to pursue civil rights activism after the assassination of Martin Luther King Jr. and was arrested during a civil rights demonstration at age 13, after which she spent one year in juvenile detention. She then spent her teenage years in the Ohio foster care system and lived between Cincinnati and New Haven, Connecticut.

She earned a bachelor of arts in political science from Yale University in 1978 and later moved to California to attend the University of California, Berkeley, where she earned a Juris Doctor and a master of arts in jurisprudence and social policy in 1982. She was admitted to the California bar the following year.

== Legal career ==
While a student at Yale in 1977, she joined Alexander v. Yale as a plaintiff, where she described being offered an A by a professor in exchange for sexual favors. The case established that sexual harassment of female university students is illegal under Title IX. She co-founded the Bay Area Defense Committee for Battered Women in 1979 while attending law school. Price is a survivor of domestic violence; in 1981, custody of her infant child was given to her abusive ex-boyfriend after Alameda County authorities deemed her uncooperative. She went to trial, where she was acquitted and granted custody of her child.

After law school, Price worked as a community defense attorney in San Francisco, handling hundreds of felony and misdemeanor cases and often representing youth clients. She founded Price and Associates, an Oakland-based civil litigation firm, in 1991 and specialized in employment law, representing victims of retaliation, wrongful termination, sexual assaults, and discrimination. In 2002, she successfully argued Morgan v. Abner before the United States Supreme Court.

In 2014, Price unsuccessfully ran for the California State Assembly in the 15th district, placing third in the primary. She unsuccessfully ran for Alameda County district attorney in 2018, losing to incumbent Nancy O'Malley in the nonpartisan primary. Later that year, she ran for mayor of Oakland, placing third and losing to incumbent Libby Schaaf. She was elected to the Alameda County Democratic Central Committee in 2016 and re-elected in 2020.

== Alameda County District Attorney ==
=== Elections ===
==== 2022 ====
O'Malley opted not to run for re-election in 2022. Price ran for district attorney in 2022, defeating Terry Wiley with 53.1% of the vote. She ran on a criminal justice reform-oriented platform and pledged to bolster rehabilitation and address police misconduct. She campaigned on ending the death penalty, ending the practice of charging minors as adults, establishing a unit dedicated to ensuring the integrity of criminal convictions, and enhancing services for gun violence victims.

Price was sworn in on January 3, 2023. She was the first Black woman to serve as Alameda County district attorney, the first person to be elected Alameda County district attorney without prior appointment to the office by the Alameda County Board of Supervisors, and the first Alameda County district attorney to lack prior experience in the Alameda County District Attorney's Office.

==== 2024 recall ====
Throughout her tenure, Price was routinely accused of being soft on crime. Paperwork was filed in August 2023 to recall Price from office. In October, a group called Save Alameda For Everyone (commonly known as SAFE) launched a campaign to collect the 73,195 valid signatures required by the county charter to put the recall on the ballot. In March 2024, SAFE submitted 127,387 signatures to county officials to be verified after spending more than $2.2 million on the signature drive effort to recall her.

On March 5, 2024, Alameda County voters approved a change to the Alameda County charter to modify the recall procedure and align it with the California state law regarding the recall of elective officers. On April 15, the Alameda County Registrar of Voters stated that enough valid signatures has been submitted to trigger a recall election. Under the county charter, the proponents needed a minimum of 73,195 valid signatures. The number of valid signatures on the petition was 74,757, and the total number of signatures disqualified was 48,617. On May 14, the Alameda County Board of Supervisors unanimously set the election date to November 5, 2024, to align with the 2024 general election.

Price was recalled with 62.9% of voters voting to recall her. According to an analysis from the San Francisco Chronicle, voters who voted to recall Price tended to live in the poorest and most heavily Black and Latino parts of Alameda County. Price conceded the election nearly two weeks later. She left office on December 5, 2024.

=== Tenure ===
In her first month in office, Price reopened eight cases involving law enforcement-involved death. In March 2023, she distributed a preliminary version of updated sentencing guidelines within her department.

In November 2021, gang members killed 23-month-old Jasper Wu during a highway shootout; the case was taken up by O'Malley prior to Price's election. When asked for an update on the case in March 2023, Price responded with an email which read in part: "Our office is currently working on a partnership with the Asian Law Caucus to support AAPI victims of violence in ways that open up broader possibilities for healing and non-carceral forms of accountability." Price kept the murder charges with a gang enhancement in the Jasper Wu case. If convicted, the defendants face over 100 years in prison.

On April 14, 2023, a "special directive" issued by the district attorney's office established a guideline whereby prosecutors are encouraged to refrain from seeking elevated sentences for serious offenses if the imposition of such sentences would lead to a disproportionate "racial impact".

In September 2023 Price's office charged David Xu with attempted murder and two felony poisoning counts. According to a Berkeley Police Department report, Xu put cadmium into his coworker Rong Yuan’s “food and water on multiple occasions.” For more than a year, Yuan suffered a series of mysterious, debilitating symptoms, including vomiting, dry heaving, and hair loss, until she grew suspicious that someone was tampering with her water bottle. Yuan’s spy-camera videos of Xu putting a substance in her water kicked off the criminal investigation. Despite the severity of the crimes, Price's office offered Xu what a presiding judge called an unusually lenient deal. He pleaded no contest to a single poisoning count in exchange for one year of felony probation and one day of credit for time served.

In January 2024, Price's office was removed from a misdemeanor case involving former prosecutor Amilcar Ford, who had become one of her major critics. Ford had been charged the previous year by her office with a little-used charge of defending after public prosecution as the prosecutor. Ford had made a declaration supporting a bid to disqualify Price from former San Leandro police officer Jason Fletcher, who had fatally shot a man inside a Walmart while on duty. Price was later removed from the Fletcher case as well due to a judge's concern about impartial comments she had made in that case. Price filed appeals against her removal on both the Ford and Fletcher case, with her appeal on the Ford case being rejected in July 2024 due to her "repeated comments in this case against the defendant."

On February 26, 2024, Patti Lee, a spokeswoman hired and fired by Price, alleged that she was fired for raising concerns about alleged California Public Records Act violations and claimed that Price has "constantly and openly" made derogatory comments against Asian Americans. She is seeking a $1.5 million settlement.

On July 11, 2024, Governor Gavin Newsom rescinded an offer he had made in February to send state and California National Guard prosecutors to Alameda County due to what he described as "her office not being cooperative." Newsom instead quadrupled the number of California Highway Patrol officers in Oakland.

On October 31, 2024, a veteran law enforcement officer with over two decades of service in the Alameda County District Attorney's office filed a lawsuit alleging termination due to anti-Asian discrimination by Price. The 85-page lawsuit details multiple instances of discrimination. According to the lawsuit, Price allegedly relied on racial stereotypes portraying Asian Americans as "sneaky, cunning [and] untrustworthy." This lawsuit adds to previous allegations against Price, including claims by former employees of anti-Asian bias and discriminatory practices within her office. Price has denied these allegations.

After being recalled, Price left office on December 5, 2024. She was temporarily replaced by her chief assistant district attorney Royl Roberts until the Alameda County Board of Supervisors appointed Ursula Jones Dickson to the vacancy.

In December 2025, an Alameda County Superior Court judge dismissed a manslaughter case against former San Leandro police officer, in agreement with DA Ursula Jones Dickson. The DA office led by Price was forced to recused from the case due to bias and member of the office hired by Price have been accused of ethical violations, like failing to turn over exculpatory material to the defence.

=== 2026 Elections ===
In December 2025, Price announced that she would run in the June 2, 2026 election for Alameda County District Attorney, seeking to regain the office after being recalled in 2024. She campaigned against incumbent District Attorney Ursula Jones Dickson, who had been appointed by the Alameda County Board of Supervisors following Price's removal from office.

In the June 2, 2026 nonpartisan primary election, Ursula Jones Dickson won re-election outright with a majority of the vote, receiving 64.3% of the votes. Price received 25.5%. Because Jones Dickson obtained more than 50% of the vote, no runoff election was required.
