= San Diego County District Attorney =

Elected district attorney for San Diego County, California

Coordinates: 32°42′58″N 117°09′58″W

San Diego County District Attorney's Office
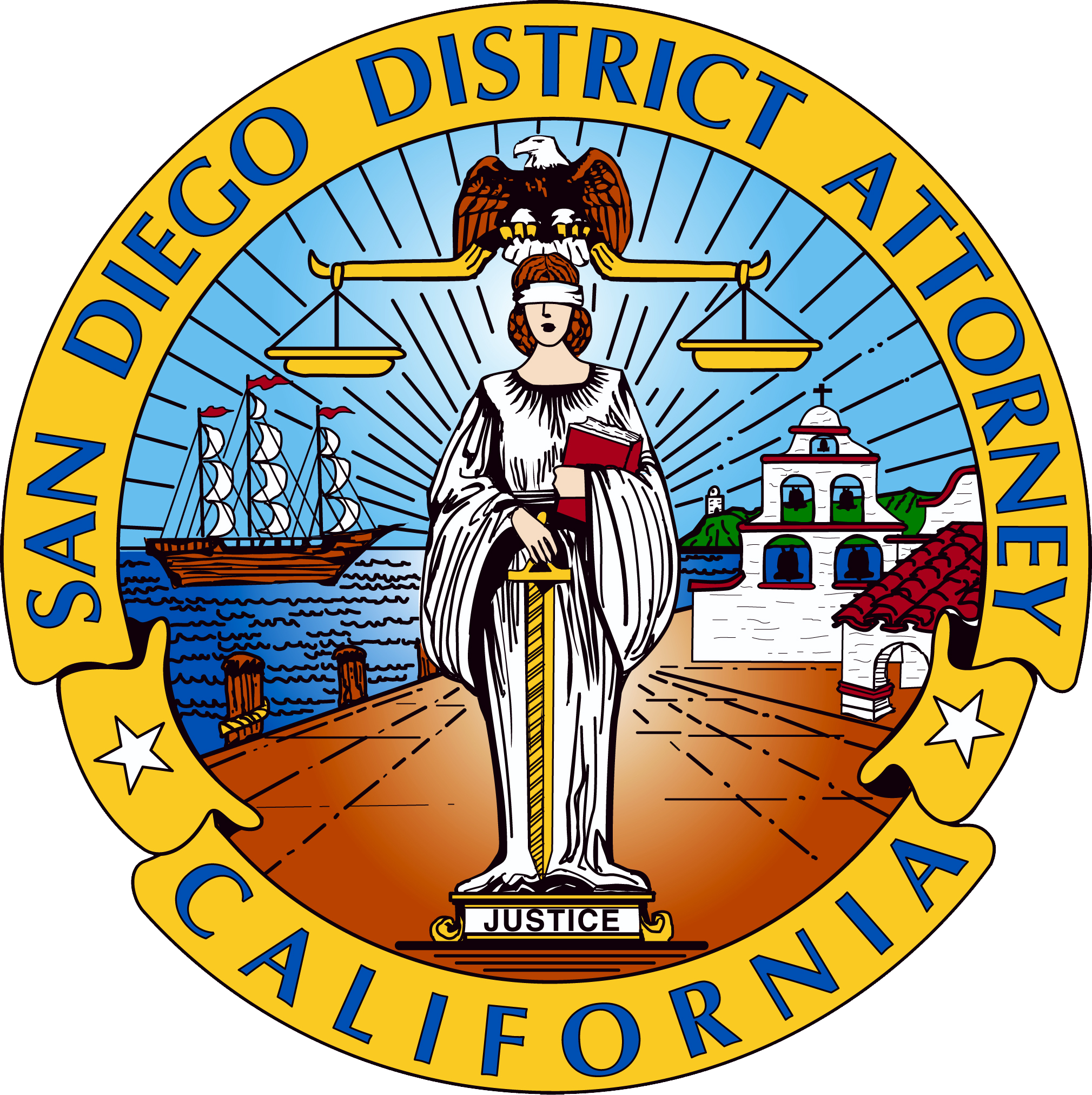
- Seal of the District Attorney — County of San Diego

Office overview
- Formed: 1801
- Jurisdiction: Government of San Diego County
- Headquarters: Hall of Justice; 330 W Broadway; San Diego, California, 92101
- Office executive: Summer Stephan, District Attorney
- Website: District Attorney’s Office website

The San Diego County District Attorney is the elected district attorney for San Diego County, California. The office is responsible for the prosecution of both felony and misdemeanor violations of California state law that occur within the jurisdiction of the county. Courts within their jurisdiction includes the San Diego Superior Court, the California Courts of Appeal for the Fourth District, and the Supreme Court of California. Federal law violations are prosecuted by the U.S. Attorney for the Southern District of California. The current district attorney is Summer Stephan, who replaced Bonnie Dumanis on an interim basis after the latter resigned in July 2017.

As in most of California, some misdemeanor crimes are prosecuted by local city attorneys. City attorneys share jurisdiction with the district attorney to prosecute misdemeanors and infractions that are committed within the city's jurisdiction. All other misdemeanor, felony, and infraction violations that occur within San Diego County are prosecuted by the district attorney. As of 2011 the district attorney's office employs 310 attorneys. The district attorney's office claims a 90+ percent conviction rate. The main office is located in downtown San Diego in the Hall of Justice, with three regional centers in El Cajon, Chula Vista, and Vista.

== History ==
In the first 20 years of San Diego County there were 23 men that held the office of district attorney, the first being William C. Ferrell.

== Partial list of District Attorneys ==
District Attorney	Took office	Left office	Party	Notes
William C. Ferrell	August 19, 1850	May, 1851		
Thomas W. Sutherland	1851	1852		
James W. Robinson	1852	1855		
Joseph R. Gitchell	1856	1858		
James Nichol	1858	1859		
William C. Ferrell	1859	1859		
Dr. David B. Hoffman	1859	1861		
A. N. Ensworth	1862	1862		Acting
Dr. David B. Hoffman	1862	1864		
Unknown	1865	1865		
Benjamin Hayes	1866	1867		
William T. McNealy	1870	1873		Youngest District Attorney ever elected at age 21
Norman H. Conklin	1877	1879		
William M. Smith	1879	1882		
W. J. Hunsaker	1882	1884		
E. W. Hendricks	1885	1886		
Martin L. Ward	1893	1894		
William Darby	1895	1895		
A. H. Sweet	1895	1898		
T. L. Lewis	1899	1902		
Cassius Carter	1903	1906		
Lewis R. Kirby	1907	1909		
H. S. Utley	1909	1914		
S. M. Marsh	1915	1917		
Lewis R. Kirby	1918	1922		
Chester C. Kempley	1923	1926		
Unknown	1927	1931		
Thomas Whelan	1931	1938		
James B. Abbey	1938	1941		
Thomas Whelan	1941	1948		
James D. Keller	1948	1971		
Edwin L. Miller	1971	1995		
Paul J. Pfingst	1995	2003		
Bonnie Dumanis	2003	2017		
Summer Stephan	2017	Present		

== Bureau of Investigation ==
The San Diego District Attorney currently maintains a law enforcement arm called Bureau of Investigation. It consists of eight divisions, which include 130 District Attorney Investigators who are sworn California peace officers pursuant to § 830.1(a) California Penal Code and other non sworn staff.

Amongst its law enforcement duties and responsibilities are assignments which may include pre-trial, gang, economic, insurance, fraud investigations; family protection, child abduction, sex crimes, stalking, and special operation investigations. Apart from this, San Diego DA Investigators may be assigned to regional local, state and federal task forces such as: computer and high tech crimes, narcotics, auto theft, identity theft, violent crimes, SAFE and fraud.
