= John Burris =

American lawyer

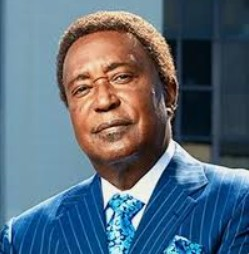
- Born: John Leonard Burris; May 8, 1945 (age 81); Vallejo, California, United States
- Occupation: Attorney
- Spouse: Cheryl Amana Burris
- Website: Official website

John Leonard Burris (born May 8, 1945) is an American civil rights attorney based in Oakland, California. He represents plaintiffs in police brutality and civil rights lawsuits.

Burris served as co-counsel for Rodney King in his civil lawsuit against the Los Angeles Police Department, resulting in a $3.8 million judgment in 1994. He has also represented athletes and entertainers in civil cases, including Tupac Shakur, Latrell Sprewell, Gary Payton, Keyshawn Johnson, and Barry Bonds.

== Early life and education ==
Burris was born in May 1945 in Vallejo, California. He graduated from Vallejo High School in 1963. He attended Solano Community College before earning a bachelor's degree in accounting from Golden Gate University. Burris received a Master of Business Administration from the UC Berkeley Graduate School of Business in 1970 and a Juris Doctor from UC Berkeley School of Law in 1973.

After law school, Burris worked at the Chicago law firm Jenner & Block and served as an assistant state's attorney in Cook County, Illinois. He returned to California as a prosecutor in Alameda County before becoming a member of the California Bar in 1976.

== Legal career and notable cases ==
Burris shifted to civil rights law following his work investigating the 1979 police killing of 15-year-old Melvin Black. In 1999, he co-authored Blue vs. Black: Let's End the Conflict Between Cops and Minorities, a book analyzing police interactions with African Americans.

Burris secured an $11.3 million trial judgment against the San Jose Police Department for Hung Lam, who was paralyzed after an officer shot him in the back. He also represented Tupac Shakur in a 1993 excessive force lawsuit against the Oakland Police Department over a jaywalking stop, reaching a $42,000 settlement.

=== Melvin Black ===
On March 17, 1979, Oakland Police officers fatally shot 15-year-old Melvin Black. Mayor Lionel Wilson appointed Burris to conduct an independent investigation. The five-month review concluded that the physical evidence contradicted the officers' statements. This case prompted Burris's transition to private civil rights practice.

=== Oakland Riders case ===
Burris and co-counsel Jim Chanin filed a federal civil rights lawsuit on behalf of 119 plaintiffs against the "Oakland Riders," a group of Oakland police officers accused of planting evidence and using excessive force. The resulting settlement mandated federal oversight of the Oakland Police Department that has continued into the 2020s.

=== Oscar Grant case ===
Burris represented the mother of Oscar Grant, a 22-year-old man fatally shot by a BART Police officer on January 1, 2009. The civil suit against Bay Area Rapid Transit resulted in a $2.8 million settlement. The case was depicted in the 2013 film Fruitvale Station.

=== Mario Woods ===
After the December 2015 police shooting of Mario Woods in San Francisco, Burris represented Woods's mother in a wrongful death lawsuit. The shooting prompted widespread protests and preceded the resignation of San Francisco Police Chief Greg Suhr.

=== Celeste Guap ===
Burris represented Celeste Guap (Jasmine Abuslin) in civil litigation regarding the sexual exploitation of a minor by officers across several Bay Area law enforcement agencies. In 2017, the city of Oakland agreed to a $989,000 settlement.

=== Brandon T. ===
In 1996, Burris took the pro bono criminal defense of Brandon T., a six-year-old boy from Richmond, California charged with attempted murder of an infant.

=== Agustin Gonsalez ===
In 2021, Burris and associate Ben Nisenbaum secured a $3.3 million settlement from the city of Hayward, California on behalf of the family of Agustin Gonsalez. Hayward officers shot Gonsalez 14 times while responding to a mental health crisis call, mistaking a small safety razor for a knife.

=== Angelo Quinto ===
Burris represented the family of Angelo Quinto, a 30-year-old Navy veteran who died in 2020 after Antioch police officers restrained him during a mental health crisis. In 2024, the city of Antioch agreed to a $7.5 million settlement and widespread department reforms regarding constitutional policing.

== Awards and honors ==
Burris was inducted into the National Bar Association Hall of Fame in 2017. He received the National Bar Association's Heman Marion Sweatt Award in 2011. He served as president of the California Association of Black Lawyers from 1979 to 1980.

In 2020, the California Lawyers Association inducted Burris into its Hall of Fame. UC Berkeley School of Law awarded him the Citation Award in 2026, recognizing him with the institution's highest honor for alumni. The Daily Journal named Burris one of California's top 100 attorneys in 2005 and 2009. Burris is the subject of the documentary film John Burris: Godfather of Police Litigation, which premiered on February 8, 2025, at UC Berkeley's International House and has since screened at venues across California; a broadcast on PBS is planned.

== Personal life ==
Burris is married to Cheryl Amana-Burris, a retired law professor from North Carolina Central University. He resides in Oakland Hills.
