= 2024 Los Angeles County elections =

- November 5, 2024
- Registered: 5,736,803
- Turnout: 66.12% (▲22.47 pp)

The 2024 Los Angeles County elections were held on November 5, 2024, in Los Angeles County, California, with nonpartisan blanket primary elections for certain offices being held on March 5. Three of the five seats of the Board of Supervisors were up for election, as well as one of the countywide elected officials, the District Attorney. In addition, elections were held for the Superior Court, along with two ballot measures.

Municipal elections in California are officially nonpartisan; candidates' party affiliations do not appear on the ballot.

== Board of Supervisors ==
Three of the five seats of the Los Angeles County Board of Supervisors were up for election to four-year terms. Incumbent supervisors Holly Mitchell, Janice Hahn and Kathryn Barger handily won re-election in the primary.

== District Attorney ==
2024 Los Angeles County District Attorney election
- March 5, 2024 (first round); November 5, 2024 (runoff)
- Turnout: 25.86% ▼ (first round); 57.68% ▼ (runoff)
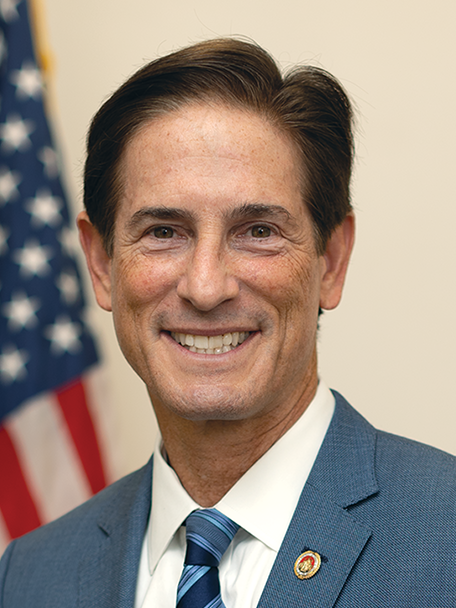

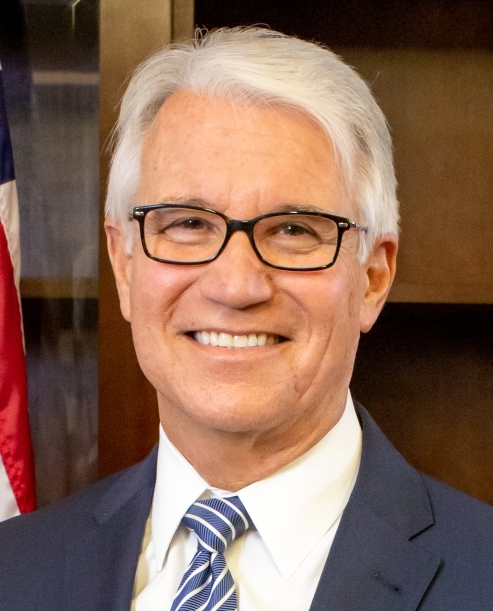

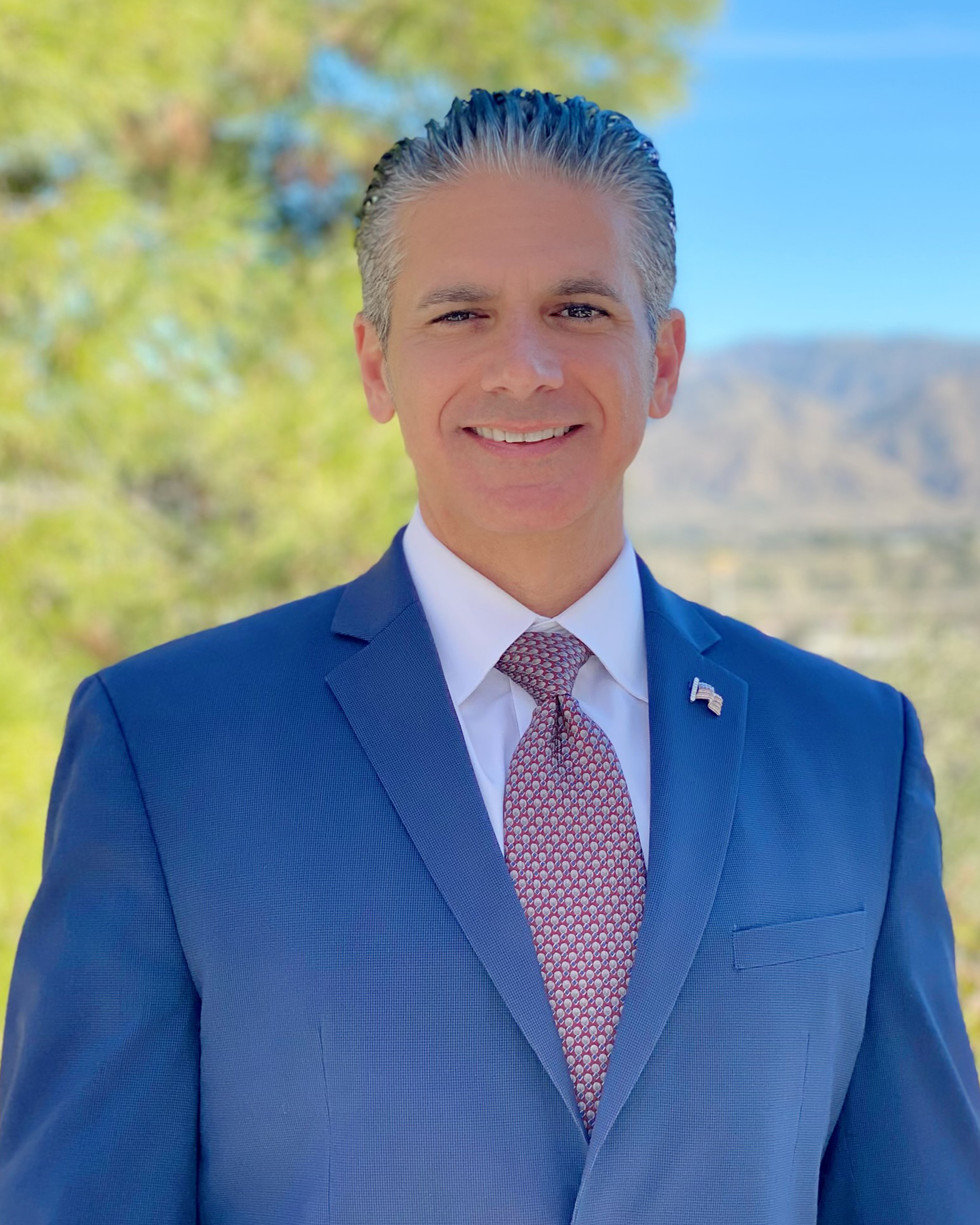
Candidate	Nathan Hochman	George Gascón	Jonathan Hatami
First round	234,509; 15.9%	370,654; 25.2%	194,755; 13.2%
Runoff	1,981,722; 59.9%	1,327,169; 40.1%	Eliminated
Candidate	Debra Archuleta	Jeff Chemerinsky	Maria Ramirez
First round	125,306; 8.5%	116,064; 7.9%	105,088; 7.1%
Candidate	John McKinney	Eric Siddall
First round	87,903; 6.0%	82,993; 5.6%
General Election Results by Precinct
Hochman:
50–60%
60–70%
70–80%
80–90%
90–100%
Gascon:
50–60%
60–70%
70–80%
80–90%
90–100%
Tie:
No votes:
District Attorney before election
George Gascón
Elected District Attorney
Nathan Hochman

Incumbent district attorney George Gascón was first elected in 2020, unseating two-term incumbent Jackie Lacey in a publicized election seen as a victory for criminal justice reform in Los Angeles. Gascón's tenure has been characterized by his liberal and progressive policies, such as opposition to capital punishment in California and reopening cases of officer-involved shootings. As a result, a series of recall efforts have been made against Gascón, and his office has received backlash from law enforcement groups and some of the families of violent crime victims.

=== Candidates ===
==== Advanced to general ====
- George Gascón, incumbent district attorney
- Nathan Hochman, former U.S. Assistant Attorney General and runner-up for California Attorney General in 2022

==== Eliminated in primary ====
- Debra Archuleta, Los Angeles County Superior Court judge
- Jeff Chemerinsky, former assistant U.S. Attorney
- Jonathan Hatami, deputy district attorney
- Dan Kapelovitz, criminal defense attorney
- Lloyd Masson, cold case prosecutor
- John McKinney, deputy district attorney
- David Milton, former Los Angeles County Superior Court judge
- Craig Mitchell, Los Angeles County Superior Court judge
- Maria Ramirez, deputy district attorney
- Eric Siddall, deputy district attorney

=== Endorsements ===
Endorsements in bold were made after the primary election

Jeff Chemerinsky

Municipal officials

- Hydee Feldstein Soto, Los Angeles City Attorney (2022–present)

Individuals

- Rick Caruso, real estate developer (co-endorsement with Siddall)
George Gascón

Organizations

- Center for Biological Diversity Action Fund
- Stonewall Democrats

Trade unions

- Los Angeles County Federation of Labor
- SEIU United Healthcare Workers West

Newspapers

- Los Angeles Times

Political parties

- California Working Families Party
- Culver City Democratic Party
- Los Angeles County Democratic Party
Jonathan Hatami

Individuals

- James Woods, actor
Nathan Hochman

U.S. executive officials

- Robert Cleve Bonner, former commissioner of U.S. Customs and Border Protection (2003–2005) and former administrator of the Drug Enforcement Administration (1990–1993)
- Nicola T. Hanna, former U.S. Attorney for the Central District of California (2018–2021)
- Stephen G. Larson, former district judge for the Central District of California (2006–2009)
- Debra Wong Yang, former U.S. Attorney for the Central District of California (2002–2006)

Local officials

- City council of Beverly Hills
- Steve Cooley, former Los Angeles County District Attorney (2000–2012)
- **Jackie Lacey**, former Los Angeles County District Attorney (2012–2020)
- **John Lee**, Los Angeles city councilor from the 12th district (2019–present)
- R. Rex Parris, mayor of Lancaster (2008–present)
- **Greig Smith**, Los Angeles city councilor from the 12th district (2003–2011, 2019)
- Steve Soboroff, Los Angeles Police Commissioner (2013–2023)

Newspapers

- Daily Breeze
- Inland Valley Daily Bulletin
- Long Beach Press-Telegram
- Los Angeles Daily News
- Pasadena Star-News
- San Gabriel Valley Tribune
- Whittier Daily News

Labor unions

- **Association for Los Angeles Deputy Sheriffs**
- **San Francisco Police Officers Association**

Organizations

- **Long Beach Area Republicans**

Political parties

- Forward Party
- Los Angeles County Republican Party

Individuals

- **Rick Caruso**, real estate developer
- **Jonathan Hatami**, deputy district attorney and former candidate for this position
- **Max Kennedy**, former assistant district attorney, author, and member of the Kennedy family
- **Rory Kennedy**, filmmaker and member of the Kennedy family
David Milton

Organizations

- California ProLife Council
Maria Ramirez

Labor unions

- International Brotherhood of Teamsters Joint Council 42
Eric Siddall

Individuals

- Rick Caruso, real estate developer (co-endorsement with Chemerinsky)

=== Debates ===
Primary
The Santa Monica Democratic Club hosted a debate between Gascón and seven other candidates on November 15, 2023. The debate saw each challenger focusing their attacks on him. Ramirez blamed Gascón for his "refusal to prosecute," while Mitchell declared that the county has become less safe. At one point, an attendant booed Gascón as he spoke.

2024 Los Angeles County District Attorney primary debates
No.	Date	Host	Moderator	Link	Nonpartisan	Nonpartisan	Nonpartisan	Nonpartisan	Nonpartisan	Nonpartisan	Nonpartisan	Nonpartisan	Nonpartisan	Nonpartisan	Nonpartisan	Nonpartisan
Key: P Participant A Absent N Not invited I Invited W Withdrawn																
Key: P Participant A Absent N Not invited I Invited W Withdrawn					Debra Archuleta	Jeff Chemerinsky	George Gascón	Jonathan Hatami	Nathan Hochman	Dan Kapelovitz	Lloyd Masson	John McKinney	David S. Milton	Craig J. Mitchell	Maria Ramirez	Eric Siddall
1	Nov. 15, 2023	Santa Monica Democratic Club			**P**	**P**	**P**	**P**	**N**	**N**	**N**	**P**	**N**	**P**	**P**	**P**
2	Jan. 18, 2024	Los Angeles Magazine	Elex Michaelson; Jon Regardie	YouTube	**P**	**P**	**P**	**P**	**P**	**N**	**N**	**P**	**P**	**P**	**P**	**P**
3	Feb. 15, 2024	Criminal Courts Bar Association; Westside Bar Association	Elex Michaelson	YouTube	**P**	**P**	**P**	**P**	**P**	**P**	**P**	**P**	**P**	**P**	**P**	**P**

Runoff

No.	Date	Host	Moderator	Link	Participants	
Key: P Participant A Absent N Non-invitee I Invitee W Withdrawn						
Key: P Participant A Absent N Non-invitee I Invitee W Withdrawn					George Gascon	Nathan Hochman
1	Sept. 11, 2024	Jewish Federation Los Angeles	Alex Cohen	Video	**P**	**P**
2	Sept. 29, 2024	KABC-TV	Marc Brown		**P**	**P**
3	Oct. 8, 2024	KNX and Los Angeles Times	Charles Feldman, Mike Simpson	Video	**P**	**P**

=== Polling ===
Primary

Poll source	Date(s) administered	Sample size (Note: Key: A – all adults RV – registered voters LV – likely voters V – unclear)	Margin of error	Jeff Chemerinsky	George Gascón	Jonathan Hatami	Nathan Hochman	Craig Mitchell	Maria Ramirez	Undecided
USC/CSU Long Beach/Cal Poly Pomona	January 21–29, 2024	(LV)	± 5.9%	2%	**15%**	**8%**	4%	2%	2%	**64%**

Runoff

Poll source	Date(s) administered	Sample size	Margin of error	George Gascón	Nathan Hochman	Undecided
Berkeley IGS	October 22–29, 2024	1,205 (LV)	± 3.0%	25%	**50%**	25%
Berkeley IGS	September 25 – October 1, 2024	908 (LV)	± 3.0%	21%	**51%**	28%
USC/CSU Long Beach/Cal Poly Pomona	September 12–25, 2024	311 (LV)	± 5.6%	20%	**44%**	36%
Berkeley IGS	July 31 – August 11, 2024	1,136 (LV)	± 3.0%	20%	**45%**	35%

=== Results ===
2024 Los Angeles County District Attorney election
Primary election
Candidate	Votes	%
George Gascón (incumbent)	**370,654**	**25.19**
Nathan Hochman	**234,509**	**15.94**
Jonathan Hatami	194,755	13.23
Debra Archuleta	125,306	8.52
Jeff Chemerinsky	116,064	7.89
Maria Ramirez	105,088	7.14
John McKinney	87,903	5.97
Eric Siddall	82,993	5.64
David S. Milton	63,044	4.28
Craig J. Mitchell	44,326	3.01
Lloyd Masson	29,306	1.99
Dan Kapelovitz	17,622	1.20
Total votes	**1,471,570**	**100.00**
General election
Nathan Hochman	**1,981,722**	**59.89**
George Gascón (incumbent)	1,327,169	40.11
Total votes	**3,308,891**	**100.00**

== Ballot measures ==
The following referendums appeared on the general election ballot:

=== Measure A ===
- Measure A
  - Homelessness Services and Affordable Housing Ordinance. This measure would repeal the tax imposed by Measure H and replace it with a 0.5% sales tax, raising an estimated $1 billion annually for affordable housing, rental assistance, mental health services, and providing services for children, families, veterans, domestic violence victims, seniors, and disabled people experiencing homelessness. Supporters of the measure include the Greater Los Angeles chapter of Habitat for Humanity and the Los Angeles Times; the opposition includes the Howard Jarvis Taxpayers Association and former supervisor Michael D. Antonovich.

Measure A
Choice	Votes	%
For	1,986,882	57.78
Against	1,452,014	42.22
Total	3,438,896	100.00

=== Measure G ===
- Measure G
  - Los Angeles County Government Structure, Ethics and Accountability Charter Amendment. This measure would establish an elected county executive position in Los Angeles County, as well as an independent ethics commission and a nonpartisan legislative analyst. The Board of Supervisors would also increase from five to nine elected members and county departments would be required to present annual budgets in public meetings. Supporters include supervisors Lindsey Horvath and Janice Hahn, as well as the Los Angeles Times; the opposition includes supervisors Holly Mitchell and Kathryn Barger, as well as the county fire and sheriff's departments.

Measure G
Choice	Votes	%
For	1,663,770	51.62
Against	1,559,509	48.38
Total	3,223,279	100.00

== See also ==
- Government of Los Angeles County
- 2024 California elections
