= 2020 Los Angeles County elections =

- November 3, 2020
- Registered: 5,813,167

The 2020 Los Angeles County elections were held on November 3, 2020, in Los Angeles County, California, with nonpartisan blanket primary elections for certain offices being held on March 3. Three of the five seats of the Board of Supervisors were up for election, as well as one of the countywide elected officials, the District Attorney. In addition, elections were held for various community college districts and water districts, as well as the Superior Court.

Municipal elections in California are officially nonpartisan; candidates' party affiliations do not appear on the ballot.

== Board of Supervisors ==
Three of the five seats of the Los Angeles County Board of Supervisors were up for election to four-year terms. Incumbent supervisors Janice Hahn and Kathryn Barger handily won re-election in the primary. In the second district, incumbent Mark Ridley-Thomas was term-limited and could not seek a fourth term, opting instead to run for Los Angeles City Council. State senator Holly Mitchell and Los Angeles City Councilor Herb Wesson advanced to the general election, eliminating former L.A. city councilor Jan Perry and Carson mayor Albert Robles. Mitchell won the general election, resulting in a supervisor board consisting entirely of women for the first time in its history.

== District Attorney ==
2020 Los Angeles County District Attorney election

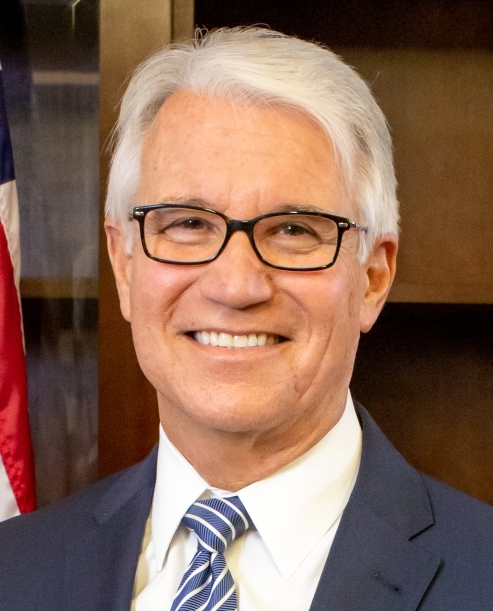

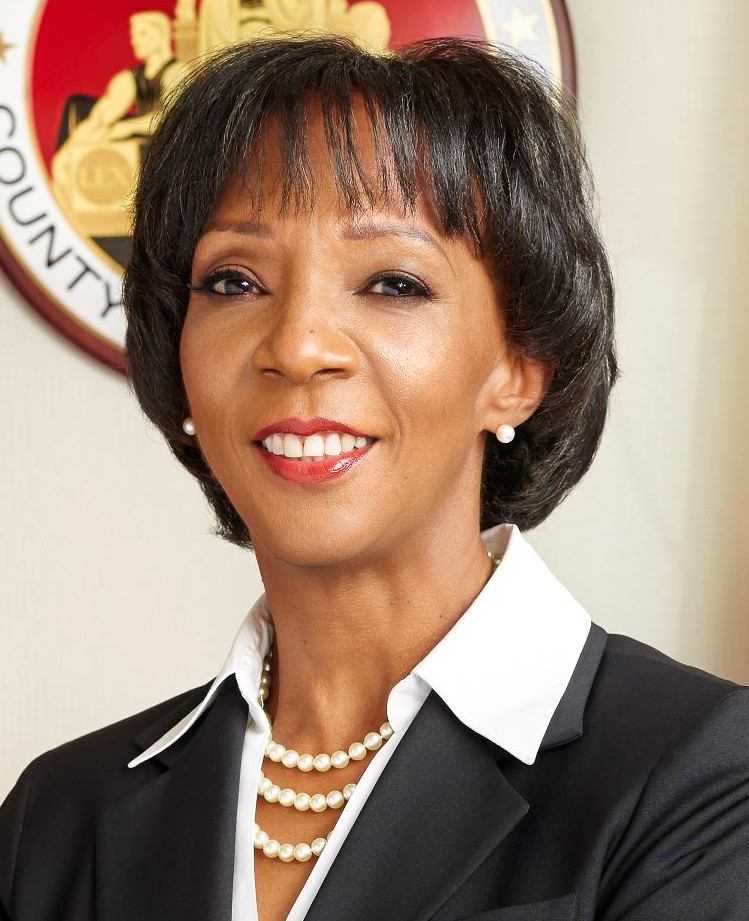

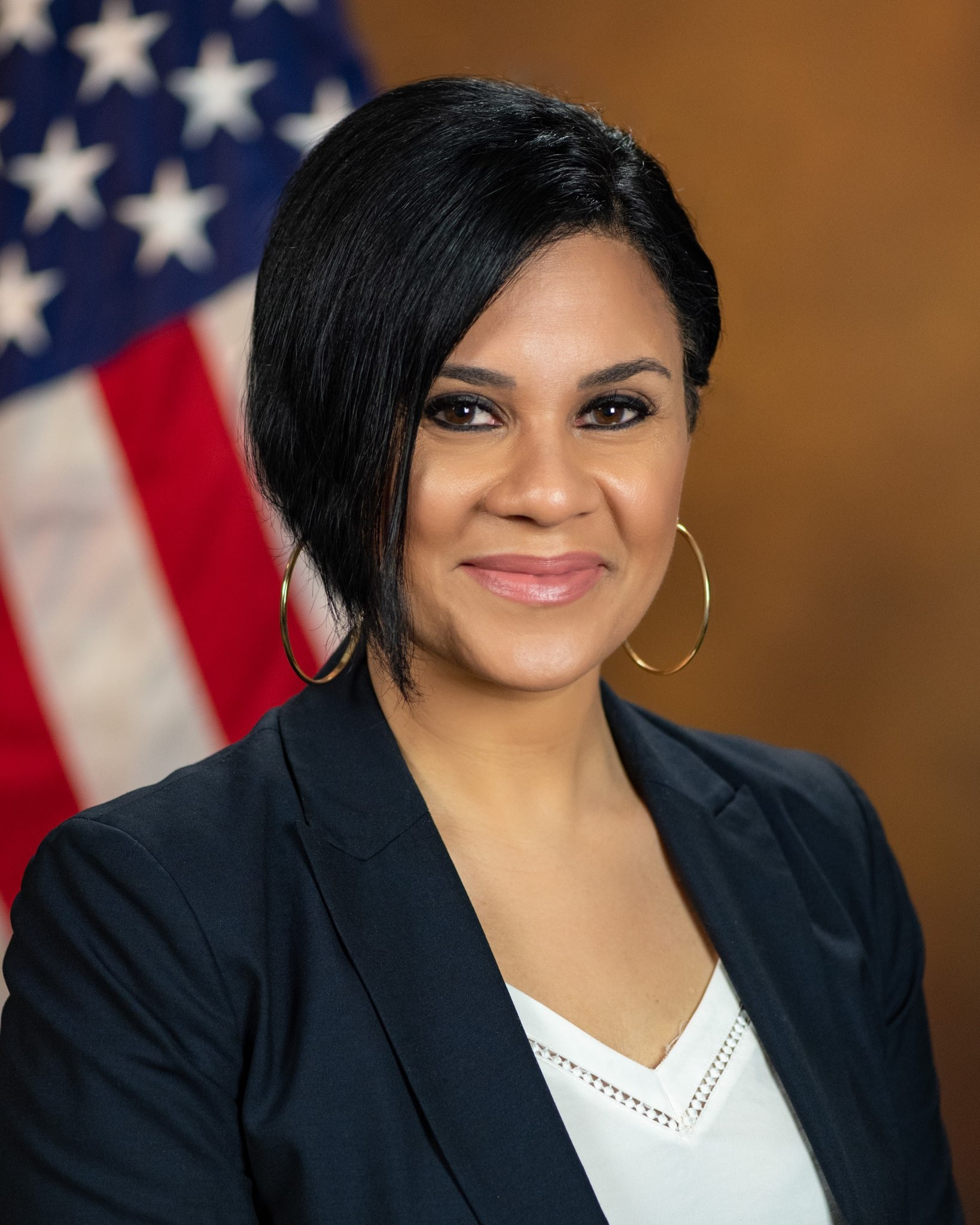
Candidate	George Gascón	Jackie Lacey	Rachel Rossi
First round	504,088; 28.22%	869,127; 48.65%	413,231; 23.13%
Runoff	2,002,865; 53.53%	1,738,617; 46.47%	Eliminated
General Election Results by Precinct
Gascon:
50–60%
60–70%
70–80%
80–90%
90–100%
Lacey:
50–60%
60–70%
70–80%
80–90%
90–100%
Tie:
No votes:
District Attorney before election
Jackie Lacey
Elected District Attorney
George Gascón

Incumbent district attorney Jackie Lacey ran for re-election to a third four-year term. Following the murder of George Floyd and the subsequent protests advocating for criminal justice reform, Lacey's "tough-on-crime" policies were criticized and contrasted with those of her opponents, former San Francisco District Attorney George Gascón and public defender Rachel Rossi. Gascón defeated Lacey in the general election by a 7-point margin. Lacey became the first district attorney to lose re-election since Gil Garcetti lost to Steve Cooley in 2000.

=== Candidates ===
==== Advanced to runoff ====
- George Gascón, former San Francisco District Attorney and former LAPD Assistant Chief of Police
- Jackie Lacey, incumbent District Attorney

==== Eliminated in primary ====
- Rachel Rossi, public defender and former Counsel to the House Judiciary Committee

=== Endorsements ===
George Gascón

U.S. senators

- Kamala Harris, U.S. senator from California (2017–present), former attorney general of California (2011–2017), former San Francisco District Attorney (2004–2011), and Democratic nominee for Vice President of the United States in 2020
- Bernie Sanders, U.S. senator from Vermont (2007–present), former U.S. representative from Vermont's at-large congressional district (1991–2007), and candidate for President of the United States in 2016 and 2020

U.S. representatives

- Alan Lowenthal, U.S. representative from California's 47th congressional district (2013–present), former state senator from the 27th district (2004–2012), and former state assemblyman from the 54th district (1998–2004)
- Adam Schiff, U.S. representative from California's 28th congressional district (2001–present) and former state senator from the 21st district (1996–2000)
- Maxine Waters, U.S. representative from California's 43rd congressional district (1991–present) and former state assemblywoman from the 48th district (1976–1990)

Local officials

- Eric Garcetti, 43rd mayor of Los Angeles (2013–present) and former Los Angeles city councilor (2001–2013)

=== Polling ===
Poll source	Date(s) administered	Sample size (Note: Key: A – all adults RV – registered voters LV – likely voters V – unclear)	Margin of error	George Gascón	Jackie Lacey	Undecided
Survey USA	September 27–29, 2020	700 (A)	–	36%	35%	29%
Tulchin Research	June 26–July 6, 2020	800 (LV)	± 3.46%	35%	32%	33%

=== Results ===
2020 Los Angeles County District Attorney election
Primary election
Candidate	Votes	%
Jackie Lacey (incumbent)	869,127	48.65
George Gascón	504,088	28.22
Rachel Rossi	413,231	23.13
Total votes	1,786,446	100.00
General election
George Gascón	2,002,865	53.53
Jackie Lacey (incumbent)	1,738,617	46.47
Total votes	3,741,482	100.00

== College districts ==
=== Compton ===
The Compton Community College District held elections for its board of trustees in two areas on November 3. Incumbent Sonia Lopez of Area 3 was re-elected unopposed.

==== Area 2 ====
2020 Compton Community College District Trustee Area 2 election
Candidate	Votes	%
Barbara Calhoun (incumbent)	11,160	66.02
Adrian Denise Cleveland	5,743	33.98
Total votes	16,903	100.00

=== Long Beach ===
The Long Beach Community College District held elections for its board of trustees in two areas on November 3. Incumbent Vivian Williams Malauulu of Area 2 was re-elected unopposed.

==== Area 4 ====
2020 Long Beach Community College District Trustee Area 4 election
Candidate	Votes	%
Herlinda Chico	20,363	41.15
Richard Gaylord	19,559	39.53
Lee Loveridge	9,558	19.32
Total votes	49,480	100.00

=== Los Angeles ===
The Los Angeles Community College District held elections held elections for its board of trustees for four of its seven seats on November 3.

==== Seat 1 ====
2020 Los Angeles Community College District Trustee Seat 1 election
Candidate	Votes	%
Andra Hoffman (incumbent)	887,245	51.54
Karen Hernandez	290,952	16.90
Charné Tunson	145,222	8.44
Tori Bailey	131,143	7.62
Antonio Paolo Sanchez	80,675	4.69
Marjorie Shaw	73,269	4.26
Jessica McCarns	63,604	3.69
R. Richard Cuevas	49,363	2.87
Total votes	1,721,473	100.00

==== Seat 3 ====
2020 Los Angeles Community College District Trustee Seat 3 election
Candidate	Votes	%
David Vela (incumbent)	628,619	36.95
Gerry Anderson	300,993	17.69
Lydia A. Gutiérrez	267,275	15.71
Sylvia Brooks Griffin	125,896	7.40
Anthony Joseph Danna	82,757	4.86
Ruffin Eugene Patterson	64,890	3.81
Samuel Paul Whitehead	64,445	3.79
Michael Batie	61,527	3.62
Robert Payne	54,035	3.18
Chatura De Silva	50,716	2.98
Total votes	1,701,153	100.00

==== Seat 5 ====
2020 Los Angeles Community College District Trustee Seat 5 election
Candidate	Votes	%
Nichelle Henderson	676,466	39.97
Cynthia Gonzalez	285,380	16.86
Scott Svonkin (incumbent)	249,251	14.73
Pat Sturges	133,173	7.87
Michelle Manos	116,454	6.88
Sergio Vargas	99,118	5.86
Nichet James-Gray	88,802	5.25
Glenn Bailey	43,711	2.58
Total votes	1,692,355	100.00

==== Seat 7 ====
2020 Los Angeles Community College District Trustee Seat 7 election
Candidate	Votes	%
Mike Fong (incumbent)	705,220	41.55
Chris Han	295,538	17.41
Nancy Pearlman	197,939	11.66
Arturo Flores	185,858	10.95
Cory D. Butler	125,562	7.40
Raquel Watts	123,995	7.31
Jamal K. Stewart	63,176	3.72
Total votes	1,697,288	100.00

== Superior Court ==
Twelve elections were held for judges to the Los Angeles County Superior Court on March 3. Three runoff elections were held on November 3. Judges are elected to six-year terms.

=== Office 17 ===
2020 Los Angeles County Superior Court Judge No. 17 election
Primary election
Candidate	Votes	%
Shannon Kathleen Cooley	1,415,124	100.00
Total votes	1,415,124	100.00

=== Office 42 ===
2020 Los Angeles County Superior Court Judge No. 42 election
Primary election
Candidate	Votes	%
Linda L. Sun	935,772	57.34
Robert Villa	696,070	42.66
Total votes	1,631,842	100.00

=== Office 72 ===
2020 Los Angeles County Superior Court Judge No. 72 election
Primary election
Candidate	Votes	%
Steve Morgan	776,425	49.16
Myanna Dellinger	624,600	39.55
Robert F. Jacobs	178,368	11.29
Total votes	1,579,393	100.00
General election
Steve Morgan	1,740,406	50.88
Myanna Dellinger	1,680,170	49.12
Total votes	3,420,576	100.00

=== Office 76 ===
2020 Los Angeles County Superior Court Judge No. 76 election
Primary election
Candidate	Votes	%
Emily Cole	1,326,626	84.99
Mike Cummins	234,242	15.01
Total votes	1,560,868	100.00

=== Office 80 ===
2020 Los Angeles County Superior Court Judge No. 80 election
Primary election
Candidate	Votes	%
David Berger	688,321	44.98
Klint McKay	574,846	37.56
Nick Rini	267,232	17.46
Total votes	1,530,399	100.00
General election
David Berger	1,865,389	55.53
Klint McKay	1,493,718	44.47
Total votes	3,359,107	100.00

=== Office 97 ===
2020 Los Angeles County Superior Court Judge No. 97 election
Primary election
Candidate	Votes	%
Sherry L. Powell	989,380	62.94
Timothy D. Reuben	582,604	37.06
Total votes	1,571,984	100.00

=== Office 129 ===
2020 Los Angeles County Superior Court Judge No. 129 election
Primary election
Candidate	Votes	%
Kenneth M. Fuller	1,073,400	70.80
Bruce A. Moss	225,419	14.87
Mark MacCarley	217,279	14.33
Total votes	1,516,098	100.00

=== Office 131 ===
2020 Los Angeles County Superior Court Judge No. 131 election
Primary election
Candidate	Votes	%
Michelle Kelley	1,365,438	100.00
Total votes	1,365,438	100.00

=== Office 141 ===
2020 Los Angeles County Superior Court Judge No. 141 election
Primary election
Candidate	Votes	%
Lana Kim	1,368,214	100.00
Total votes	1,368,214	100.00

=== Office 145 ===
2020 Los Angeles County Superior Court Judge No. 145 election
Primary election
Candidate	Votes	%
Adam Montalban	960,425	63.14
Troy Slaten	560,650	38.86
Total votes	1,521,075	100.00

=== Office 150 ===
2020 Los Angeles County Superior Court Judge No. 17 election
Primary election
Candidate	Votes	%
Manuel Alejandro Almada	812,706	52.21
Tom Parsekian	418,129	28.86
Sherri Onica Valle Cole	325,664	20.92
Total votes	1,556,499	100.00

=== Office 162 ===
2020 Los Angeles County Superior Court Judge No. 162 election
Primary election
Candidate	Votes	%
Scott Andrew Yang	766,898	49.00
David D. Diamond	485,597	31.03
Caree Annette Harper	312,645	19.98
Total votes	1,565,140	100.00
General election
Scott Andrew Yang	1,817,514	53.66
David D. Diamond	1,569,690	46.34
Total votes	3,387,204	100.00

== See also ==
- Government of Los Angeles County
- 2020 California elections
