= George Gascón =

American lawyer and police officer (born 1954)

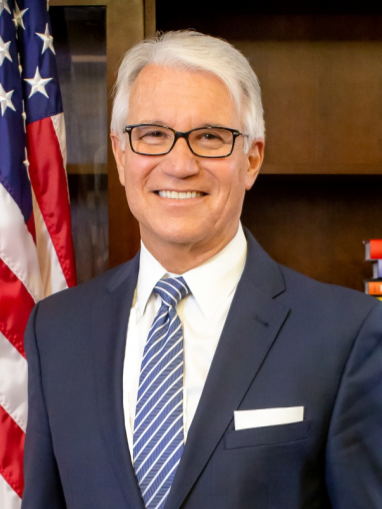
- Official portrait, 2021

43rd District Attorney of Los Angeles County
- In office December 7, 2020 – December 3, 2024
- Preceded by: Jackie Lacey
- Succeeded by: Nathan Hochman

28th District Attorney of San Francisco
- In office January 9, 2011 – October 19, 2019
- Preceded by: Kamala Harris
- Succeeded by: Suzy Loftus (interim); Chesa Boudin

Chief of the San Francisco Police Department
- In office January 8, 2010 – January 9, 2011
- Preceded by: Heather Fong
- Succeeded by: Greg Suhr

Chief of the Mesa Police Department
- In office 2006–2009
- Preceded by: Dennis Donna
- Succeeded by: Frank Milstead

Personal details
- Born: March 12, 1954 (age 72) Havana, Cuba
- Party: Democratic
- Other political affiliations: Republican (formerly)
- Spouse: Fabiola Kramsky
- Education: California State University, Long Beach (BA); Western State College of Law (JD)

Military service
- Allegiance: United States
- Branch/service: United States Army
- Years of service: 1972–1975
- Rank: Sergeant

George Gascón (born March 12, 1954) is an American attorney and former police officer who served as the district attorney of Los Angeles County from December 7, 2020, to December 3, 2024. A member of the Democratic Party and a former member of the Republican Party, Gascón served as the district attorney of San Francisco from 2011 to 2019. Prior to his work as a prosecutor, he was an assistant chief of police for the LAPD, and chief of police in Mesa, Arizona, and San Francisco.

Gascón was born in Havana, Cuba. In 1967, his family emigrated to the United States and settled in Bell, California. He joined the United States Army at the age of eighteen and became a sergeant. After earning a Bachelor of Arts in history from California State–Long Beach, Gascón joined the Los Angeles Police Department as a patrol officer. He earned his Juris Doctor degree while serving with the Los Angeles Police Department.

During his tenure with the Los Angeles Police Department, he attained the rank of assistant chief of police under Chief William Bratton. In 2006, Gascón was appointed chief of police for the Mesa Police Department. He had frequent clashes with Maricopa County Sheriff Joe Arpaio over illegal immigration sweeps allegedly targeting Latinos. In 2009, then-Mayor Gavin Newsom appointed Gascón as the chief of police for the San Francisco Police Department. In 2011, after Kamala Harris was elected California attorney general, Newsom appointed him to fill the position she was vacating as the San Francisco district attorney. He was subsequently elected in his own right in November 2011, and again in 2015. In 2020, Gascón unseated incumbent Los Angeles County District Attorney Jackie Lacey with a reformist agenda. Gascón's liberal and progressive policies received backlash during his time in San Francisco and Los Angeles, including several recall attempts in the latter role. In the 2024 Los Angeles County elections, he was defeated in his bid for reelection for Los Angeles County district attorney by former federal prosecutor Nathan Hochman.

== Early life and education ==
Gascón was born on March 12, 1954, in pre-Communist Cuba. Shortly after the Cuban Revolution in 1959, his father lost his job for alleged anti-government activity, and his uncle, a union organizer, was jailed for over a decade. In 1967, Gascón and his family emigrated from Cuba to the United States.

The family settled in Bell, California, a suburb of Los Angeles. At the age of thirteen, Gascón enrolled in Los Angeles Unified School District schools where he struggled to learn English. He recalled: "I was spending hours translating everything with a Spanish-English dictionary. I started missing a lot of school." By 1972, he dropped out of Bell High School.

Gascón joined the United States Army in 1972. In the Army, he earned his high school diploma and two years toward an undergraduate degree. Gascón served in the 64th Military Police Detachment, much of it in Germany. In 1975, he received an honorable discharge as a sergeant. After serving in the Army, Gascón completed a Bachelor of Arts in history from California State University, Long Beach while working sales jobs.

== Los Angeles Police Department ==
In 1978, Gascón joined the Los Angeles Police Department as a patrol officer. After a three-year stint with the LAPD, he returned to work in business management. He served as a reserve officer in the Hollenbeck Division of LAPD until 1987. In 1987, he returned to LAPD as a full-time police officer. Upon his return, he rose through the ranks of LAPD as a sergeant, lieutenant, captain, commander, and deputy chief in 2002. During his time with LAPD, Gascón earned his J.D. degree from Western State College of Law in 1996.

=== Training commander after Rampart scandal ===
In 2000, he took command of the LAPD training unit at the height of the Rampart scandal. He was in command of the LAPD training unit, overseeing the LAPD Academy and in-service training, during the federal government's oversight of police reforms. Even though there was a mandate for reform, then-Police Chief Bernard Parks did not allocate funding for additional training. Gascón used a grant that had originally been funded to research community-policing strategies, and produced 300,000 additional training hours.

One of his first orders as training commander was to create an ethics training manual for the LAPD. He also implemented problem-based learning and posted a copy of the Bill of Rights in every LAPD Academy classroom. Michael Gennaco, the former head of the United States Justice Department's civil rights division said at the time, "He fundamentally changed the way the LAPD teaches its officers about civil rights."

In 2002, Gascón applied to be the Los Angeles Police Department Chief of Police. He wanted to partner with community agencies to reduce California's prisoner-recidivism rate. William Bratton was ultimately appointed Chief of Police.

=== Assistant Chief of Police ===
In 2003, he was sworn in as assistant chief of the Los Angeles Police Department under Bratton. In 2004, Gascón oversaw the daily operations of the department. Bratton credited Gascón with helping reduce the rate of violent crime in Los Angeles at that time.

== Mesa Chief of Police ==
In 2006, Gascón was hired as Chief of Police for the Mesa Police Department. Gascón had frequent clashes with Maricopa County Sheriff Joe Arpaio over illegal immigration sweeps allegedly targeting Latinos. Arpaio regularly conducted saturation patrols and illegal immigration sweeps, targeting Latino neighborhoods and day laborers. Arpaio allegedly stopped cars with Latino drivers or passengers to check their immigration status. Gascón condemned the policies and tactics of Arpaio and his deputies, and actively worked to protect the Latino community in Mesa. He testified at a 2009 congressional hearing regarding the civil rights abuses committed by state and local police functioning as federal immigration agents.

Gascón served as chief of the Mesa, Arizona police department from 2006 to 2009.

== San Francisco Chief of Police ==
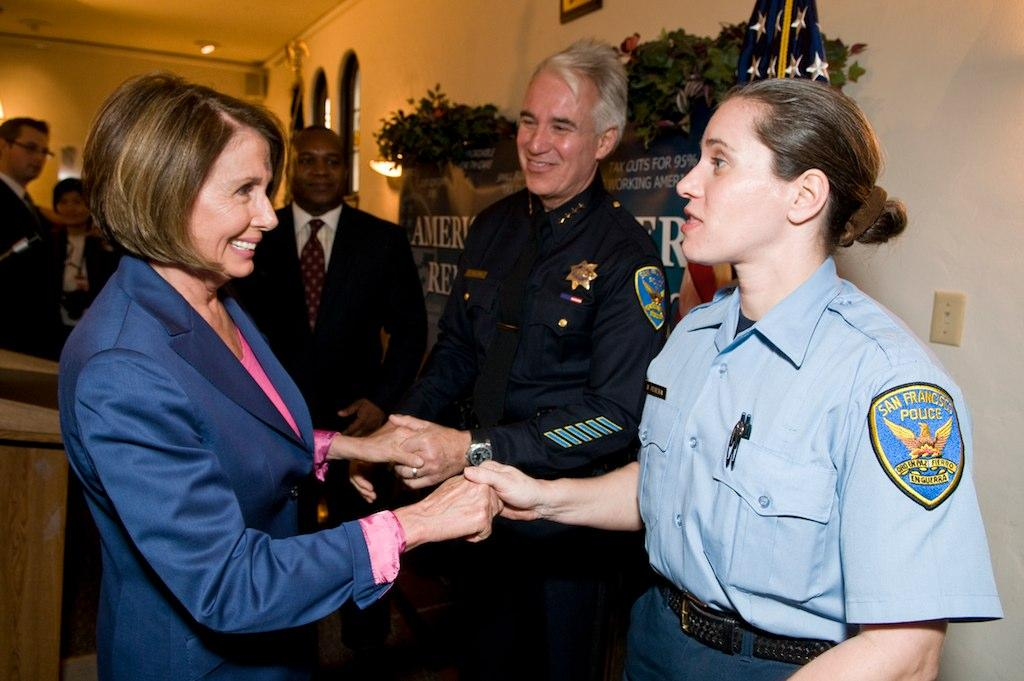
Chief Gascón with U.S. Representative Nancy Pelosi in 2010

Gascón served as San Francisco Police Department chief from August 2009 to January 2011, succeeding Heather Fong. He was replaced by Greg Suhr. In 2009, San Francisco saw a significant drop in homicides, falling from 96 in 2008 to 45 in 2009. At the time, Gascón attributed the dramatic drop in homicides to the policies enacted by his predecessor. Between 2009 and 2011, (reported) violent crime decreased in San Francisco by 3%.

In March 2010, Gascón made remarks about San Francisco's susceptibility to terrorism by the "Middle Eastern community" that upset Arab-Americans. Several San Francisco police officers accused Gascón of calling African Americans "those people" in "a derogatory way." Gascón denied making those remarks.

== San Francisco District Attorney ==
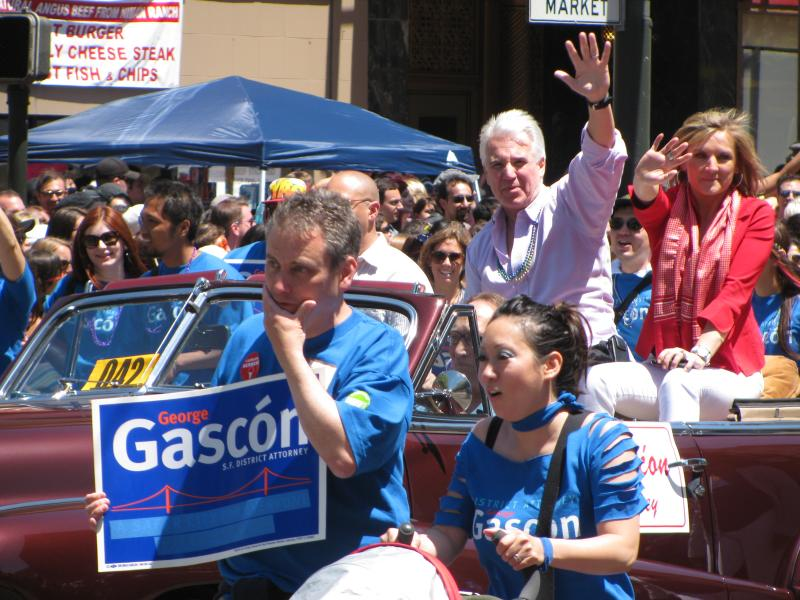
Gascón at San Francisco Pride in 2011.

In 2011, in his last act as Mayor of San Francisco, Gavin Newsom appointed Gascón as San Francisco District Attorney, filling the job vacated by Kamala Harris. Gascón was subsequently elected in his own right in November 2011, and again in 2015. In 2018, Gascón announced that he would not be seeking re-election, citing his need to care for his mother in Los Angeles. He resigned from his San Francisco District Attorney position in October 2019.

=== Bail reform ===
Gascón advocated for the end of cash bail. Gascón brought the Public Safety Assessment (PSA) tool to San Francisco to assist courts in making bail decisions more equitably. Initial results indicate that for the 15 months following the implementation of the PSA tool, only 6% of defendants released went on to commit a new crime while awaiting trial, roughly half the rate observed during a similarly recorded period of time in 2006 during which cash bail was used exclusively to determine which defendants were released awaiting trial, according to self reported statistics provided by the DA's office.

=== Criticism ===
During Gascón's time as District Attorney, property crime increased by 49%. Some of his critics have blamed this increase on his office's reluctance to file charges against "low-level" offenders; during Gascón's tenure, misdemeanor charges were only filed in 40% of cases presented by the San Francisco Police Department.

=== Drug policy ===
In 2018, Gascón announced that he would apply California's Adult Use of Marijuana Act retroactively to every marijuana case since 1975 in order to level the playing field for those adversely affected by the criminalization of marijuana. The move cleared misdemeanor convictions and reduced felony convictions for those entitled for record relief under the act. He partnered with Code for America, a 501(c)3 non-profit organization, which kicked off a national movement resulting in dozens of cities across the country clearing marijuana convictions.

Prop 47, which was co-authored by Gascón, reduced simple drug possession from a felony to a misdemeanor in California.

=== Data management system ===
Gascón implemented and launched California's first prosecutorial data management system, similar to CompStat, called DA Stat. This internal data collection tool is part of a trend toward "data-driven prosecution".

=== Investigations of police officers ===
Gascón launched a blue-ribbon panel, which was set to investigate a scandal in the San Francisco Police Department regarding allegations that homophobic and racist texts had been exchanged between 14 or more police officers in 2014.

In 2016, following recommendations of both the Department of Justice and Blue Ribbon Panel, Gascón secured funding to create the Independent Investigations Bureau, which investigates shootings involving police officers, excessive force, and in-custody deaths.

=== Juvenile offenders ===
Gascón helped launch San Francisco's Young Adult Court in 2015. He described the program as "a hybrid of the adult and juvenile justice systems tailored to the biology and circumstances of offenders 18 to 24". In the program, a prosecutor refers a case to the Alternative Sentencing Planner (ASP) who determines if alternatives to incarceration in the community are appropriate.

In 2019, Gascón supported San Francisco's move to close Juvenile Hall, citing studies showing that incarceration of juveniles significantly increases a young person's likelihood of recidivism and that "California's juvenile facilities aren't rehabilitating kids or making our communities safer."

Gascón has taken a like approach to prosecuting youth in Los Angeles County, launching a program to spare minors from criminal charges for burglary, vehicle theft, arson, sexual battery, assault, and robbery in cases that resulted in no serious harm and involved no firearms, depending on the victims’ agreement, the offenders’ admission of responsibility, and the expectation that offenders meet their victims. This program's description in a memo drew prompt criticism from other officials, such as Sacramento Dist. Atty. Anne Marie Schubert, who called it “reckless,” and Los Angeles Deputy Dist. Atty. Jon Hatami, who noted that it failed to bar offenders who used weapons other than guns. "I don’t think any reasonable or experienced prosecutor would issue blanket policies,” said Hatami, “but George Gascón has no experience … in any court.” Similarly, when a 17-year-old offender in a potentially fatal hit-and-run case was sentenced to five months’ detention in a juvenile probation camp, Deputy Dist. Atty. John McKinney denounced Gascón for leniency: "I would have been considering attempted murder charges and at least assault with a vehicle.… He obviously cares more for offenders than he does for victims."

=== Legislation ===
Gascón coauthored Senate Bill 962, legislation requiring a "kill switch" on all smartphones sold in California.

Gascón co-authored Proposition 47 that reduced many crimes from felonies to misdemeanors. Proposition 47, according to one study, has reduced the disparity in arrests in San Francisco between Caucasians and African Americans by nearly half. Some have criticized the law.

=== Sexual assault ===
Gascón filed a civil complaint against Uber alleging that the company failed to protect riders from sex offenders and other people who have been convicted of serious felonies.

=== Weekend rebooking ===
Gascón expanded the DA's Charging Unit to support "weekend rebooking" in order to reduce the jail population and reduce time in custody.

== Los Angeles County District Attorney ==
In 2019, Gascón announced he was running to be the District Attorney for Los Angeles County. Contributions against Gascón largely came from law enforcement groups, such as one million dollars from the Los Angeles Police Protective League, while contributions to his campaign came from progressive donors like George Soros, Patty Quillin and Reed Hastings. Gascón's campaign was endorsed by California Governor Gavin Newsom, vice presidential nominee Kamala Harris, U.S. Senator Bernie Sanders, and U.S. Senator Elizabeth Warren. Gascón campaigned on a platform of criminal justice reform, including opposing the death penalty and ending the practice of charging children as adults. During the race, he indicated that he supported creating a civil rights division within the Los Angeles County District Attorney's Office. San Francisco Mayor London Breed and City Attorney Dennis Herrera endorsed Gascón's opponent in the race for District Attorney of Los Angeles County, the incumbent Jackie Lacey. Gascón defeated Lacey on November 6, 2020.

Gascón was sworn in as the 43rd District Attorney of Los Angeles County on December 7, 2020. Gascón implemented a series of policies on his first day as Los Angeles County D.A. by announcing that his office would not seek cash bail for certain minor offenses and would seek release for those currently awaiting such bail, would never seek the death penalty, and would end the charging of children as adults. He also announced plans to reevaluate any sentence for which the prisoner had already served 20 years, and to reopen several cases of officer-involved shootings that had been declined for filing from the previous eight years.

=== Crime Victims Advisory Board ===
In December 2020, Gascón established the Los Angeles County District Attorney's office first Crime Victims Advisory Board. The group is composed of survivors of various forms of crime who meet regularly, seek input from the larger community, and advise the office on policies related to victims' needs in relation to the criminal justice system.

=== Death penalty ===
Gascón is against the death penalty. In 2019, California Gov. Gavin Newsom announced a moratorium on capital punishment in California, however the sentence was still being sought in Los Angeles County. Gascón withdrew the sentence of death being sought in 17 active cases upon taking office. Gascón also announced his office would review cases of those on California's death row from Los Angeles County who might be resentenced to life without parole.

=== 2022 Los Angeles City Council recordings ===
Gascón is referenced in the leaked audio recordings of a 2022 meeting between Los Angeles City Council president Nury Martinez, councilmember Gil Cedillo, Councilmember Kevin de León and Los Angeles County Federation of Labor president Ron Herrera. The audio recordings gained widespread attention due to the personal attacks, racist and colorist language, and discussion of political goals. The participants were discussing gerrymandering when Martinez stated, "Fuck that guy ... He's with the Blacks", referring to Gascón.

=== Criticism ===
Gascón's policies have sparked outrage from some victims and their families, and revolt from some of his own prosecutors, who have sought to block him in court.

His policy of not prosecuting teens as adults has also been criticized by victims' families and others in 2024 when violent teens he chose to prosecute as juveniles re-offended: once when a 16-year-old male involved in a murder was released after five years in custody, only to be charged with involvement in another murder, and again when a 17-year-old female gang member convicted in a double murder was arrested 6 months after her release on charges of another murder.

=== Recall efforts ===
Within a week of Gascón assuming office, a Facebook page launched to garner support for recalling him from office. February 2021, an effort began to place a proposition on an upcoming ballot to remove Gascón from office. While the recall's most visible supporter was former Los Angeles County Sheriff Alex Villanueva, it was led by former District Attorney Steve Cooley, as well as Desiree Andrade and Tania Owen, two women who lost relatives to violent crime. In March 2021, the effort to recall Gascón was started after a petition was approved, to which the group would need to gather 579,062 by October 2021. In September 2021, the recall effort failed after the group were unable to gather enough signatures for the October deadline, but the group vowed to retry at a later time.

Subsequently, a third attempt to recall the District Attorney began. On June 15, 2022, the group announced that they had secured more than 566,857 signatures required to officially make the ballot, with them shifting focus onto gathering more signatures to help with any invalidated signatures. The group behind the recall effort submitted the signatures on July 6, 2022. On July 9, 2022, the Los Angeles County Registrar-Recorder/County Clerk announced that the campaign had submitted 715,833 signatures, and would be conducting the verification process by using a 5% random sample of the total signatures. On July 14, the Registrar announced that it had completed its check and would proceed to checking all the ballots. On August 15, 2022, the recall petition failed as the Los Angeles County Registrar-Recorder/County Clerk stated that 195,783 signatures were invalid.

Subsequently, in the 2024 election, Gascon lost the reelection to Nathan Hochman.

== Publications ==
- "New Training Program Helps LAPD Meet Training Mandates", Police Chief, November 2001
- Jones was interviewed and featured in the award-winning documentary feature film Reimagining Safety (2023) by director Matthew Solomon. The film covers defunding the police and the George Floyd protests.

== Awards ==
- Visionary Award (2017), Southern California Leadership Network
- Top 100 Lawyers in California by the Daily Journal
- Anti-Defamation League's Civil Rights Award
