= Rachel Rossi =

American lawyer (born 1983)

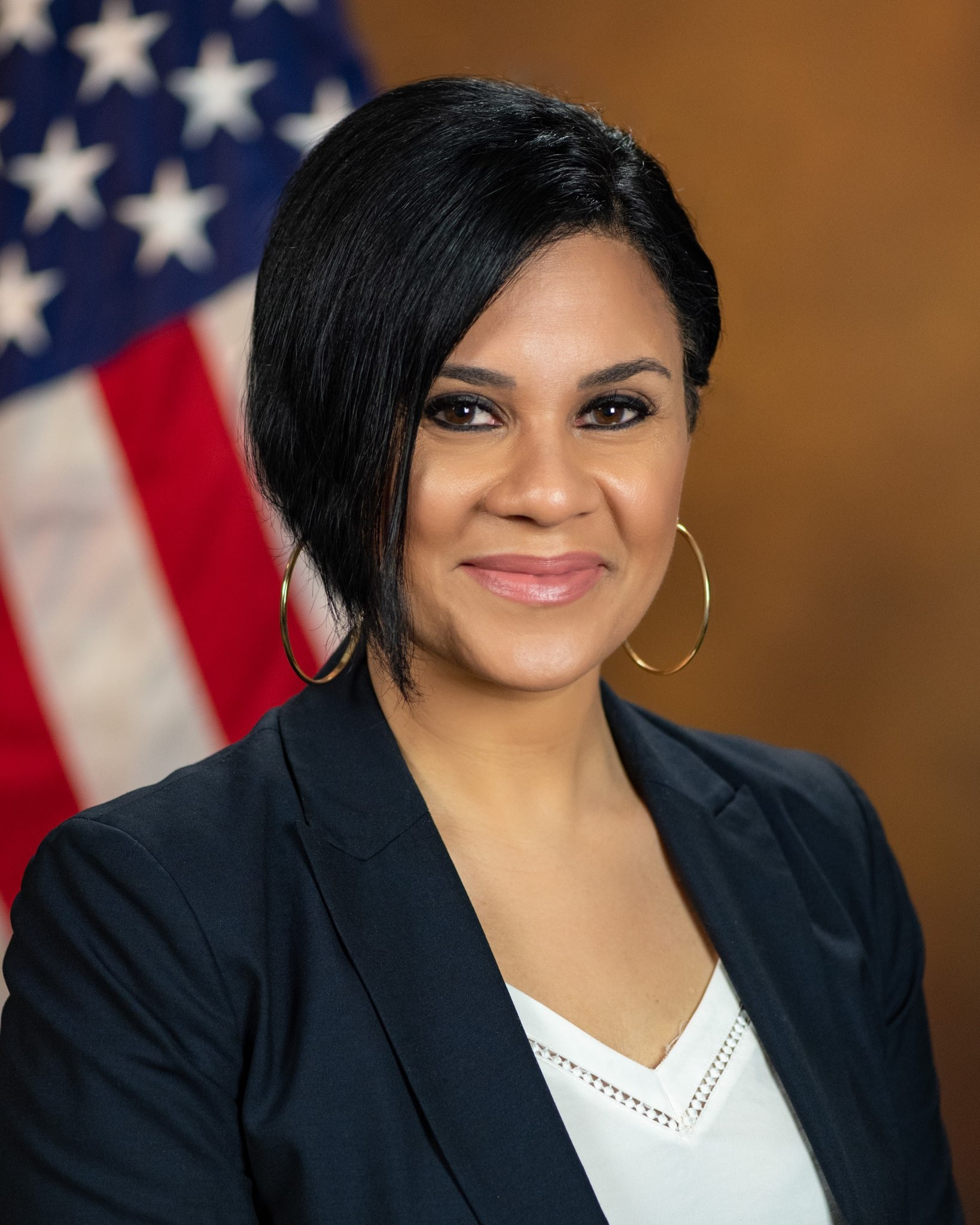
- Rossi in 2022

President of Alliance for Justice
- Incumbent
- Assumed office May, 2025

Personal details
- Born: 1983 (age 42–43) San Gabriel Valley, Los Angeles County, California, U.S.
- Education: Bethany University (BA); Pepperdine University (JD)

Rachel Rossi (born 1983) is an American lawyer and public official. She is the President of Alliance for Justice and formerly served as the Director of the Office for Access to Justice at the United States Department of Justice. Rossi has worked as a public defender in Los Angeles County, and as criminal justice counsel to Democratic Senator Dick Durbin and for the United States House Committee on the Judiciary, Subcommittee on Crime, Terrorism and Homeland Security. Rossi was the first former public defender to run for the nonpartisan seat of Los Angeles District Attorney.

== Early life and education ==
Rossi grew up in the San Gabriel Valley region of Southern California. She attended Claremont High School before earning her bachelor's degree from Bethany University and a Juris Doctor from the Pepperdine University School of Law. She has lived most of her adult life in Los Angeles County, California and is a daughter of immigrant parents born in the Dominican Republic and Greece.

== Career ==
From 2011 to 2019, she was a county and federal public defender in Los Angeles; she has said that defending clients who were generally low-income and people of color, many of whom had suffered homelessness, mental illness or drug abuse, gave her a passion for justice and reform.

She then became criminal justice counsel to Dick Durbin, Senate Democratic Whip and Chairman of the United States Senate Committee on the Judiciary, working on Supreme Court nominations including those of Neil Gorsuch and Brett Kavanaugh. She served as lead staffer on the 2018 First Step Act, which seeks to reduce recidivism and established federal prison reform.

Rossi was then recruited to be Counsel to the United States House Committee on the Judiciary, Subcommittee on Crime, Terrorism and Homeland Security. She worked with Judiciary Chairman Jerry Nadler and Crime Subcommittee Chair Karen Bass on criminal justice reform legislation and congressional hearings.

In November 2019, Rossi announced she was running as the first former public defender candidate for Los Angeles County District Attorney. Rossi faced incumbent Jackie Lacey and former San Francisco DA, George Gascón. During her campaign, she criticized the Los Angeles legal system, pointing out that 80% of prisoners there are black or Latino, and one in three suffers from some form of mental illness. Rossi was five points shy of qualifying for the runoff election, receiving almost half a million votes.

In November 2020, Rossi was named a member of the Agency Review Team for the Presidential transition of Joe Biden to support transition efforts related to the United States Department of Justice. In 2021, Rossi was appointed Deputy Associate Attorney General in the Office of the United States Associate Attorney General, Vanita Gupta. On May 20, 2023 President Biden and Attorney General Garland appointed Rossi as Director of the Office for Access to Justice in the United States Department of Justice.

In May 2025, Rossi was named the President of Alliance for Justice, a progressive judicial advocacy group in the United States.

== Honors ==
In 2019 Rossi was recognized by the National Bar Association as one of the United States' top 40 lawyers aged under 40. She has been recognized as a Lawyer of Color during the Congressional Black Caucus Foundation conference.
