= David Berger (attorney) =

American lawyer

David Alan Berger
- Born: David Alan Berger
- Education: University of London, LL.B. Law 1993, Loyola Law School J.D. Law 1997
- Occupation: Deputy District Attorney
- Years active: 1997 to present
- Website: Official Website

David Alan Berger is a deputy district attorney for the County of Los Angeles, California. He is also the trial advocacy team coach, adjunct professor and the Alternate Sentencing Court ("ASC") designee for the Airport Branch of the District Attorney's Office.

== Early life and education ==
David Berger is a third-generation Los Angeles family, and the first generation to obtain a postgraduate degree. Berger holds a Bachelor of Laws degree from the University of London. He graduated from Loyola Law School in Los Angeles and was admitted to the California Bar Association in 1997.

== Professional career ==
Berger has been with the Los Angeles District Attorney office for over 22 years. Berger was endorsed by the Los Angeles Times for Office 158 in the 2016 election of Los Angeles County Superior Court Judges. The Los Angeles Times stated that Berger was "the best of the candidates in this particular race," and "He has a long and successful record as a prosecutor." Berger was also endorsed by District Attorney Jackie Lacey, former District Attorney Steve Cooley, Hon. Elden S. Fox, Metropolitan News-Enterprise, Michael D. Antonovich, Supervisor 5th District, LA County Board of Supervisors, Hon. Robert Philibosian, District Attorney LA County (ret), Professional Peace Officer's Association, British-American Bar Association, the Association of Deputy District Attorneys, Hon. David S Wesley, Former Judge Criminal Division, Antelope Valley Press and Hon. Scott M. Gordon, Assistant Supervising Judge, Criminal Division.

== Personal life ==
Berger lives in Los Angeles with his wife. He has two adult children and is a grandfather.
