= Nathan Hochman =

American attorney (born 1963)

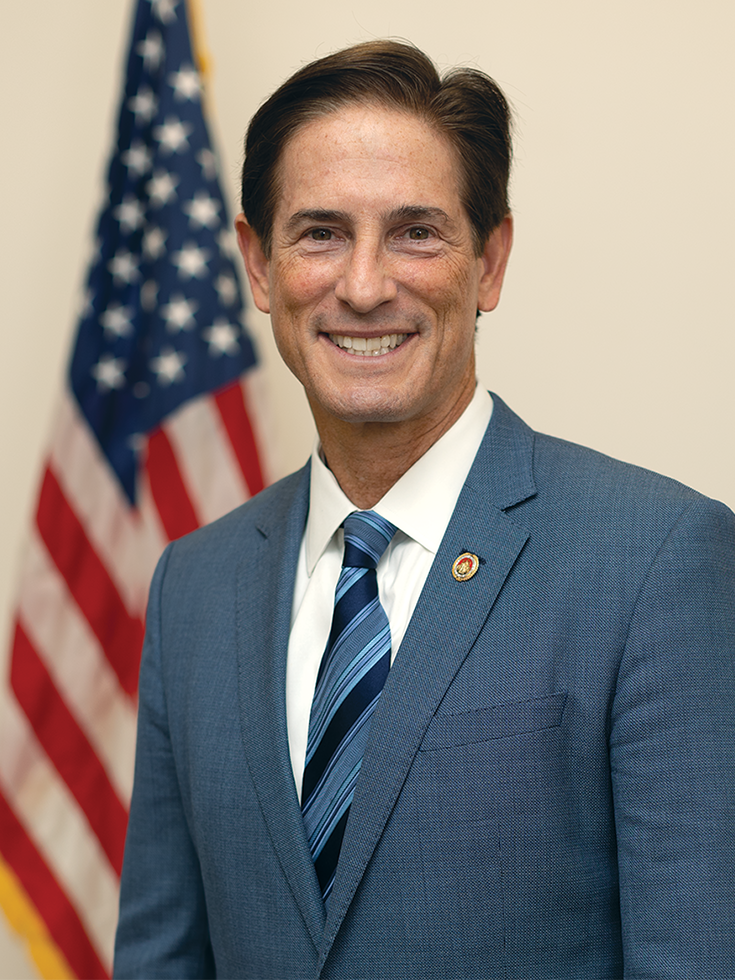
- Official portrait, 2024

44th District Attorney of Los Angeles County
- Incumbent
- Assumed office December 3, 2024
- Preceded by: George Gascón

United States Assistant Attorney General for the Tax Division
- In office January 22, 2008 – January 20, 2009
- President: George W. Bush
- Preceded by: Eileen O'Connor
- Succeeded by: Kathryn Keneally

Personal details
- Born: Nathan Joseph Hochman; November 26, 1963 (age 62) Los Angeles, California, U.S.
- Party: Republican (before 2023); Independent (2023–present)
- Education: Brown University (BA); Stanford University (JD)
- Website: Campaign website

Nathan Joseph Hochman (born November 26, 1963) is an American politician and attorney who has served as the 44th District Attorney of Los Angeles County since 2024. Hochman is a former federal prosecutor and Assistant U.S. Attorney General.

Hochman served as United States Assistant Attorney General for the Tax Division of the United States Department of Justice in 2008. Prior to that, Hochman was an Assistant United States Attorney for the Central District of California from 1990 to 1997, serving in the Criminal Division. Hochman also had an extensive career in the private sector, as a partner of several nationwide firms and as a leading expert in tax law, criminal defense, and environmental law, and prior to becoming district attorney, was General Counsel at Ross LLP. Hochman was president of the Los Angeles City Ethics Commission from 2011 to 2016. His legal career has included both federal prosecution and private practice

Hochman was the Republican nominee in the 2022 California Attorney General election. After becoming an independent, he defeated George Gascón in 2024 by a 20-point margin, becoming the 44th Los Angeles County District Attorney in a landslide.

== Early life and career ==
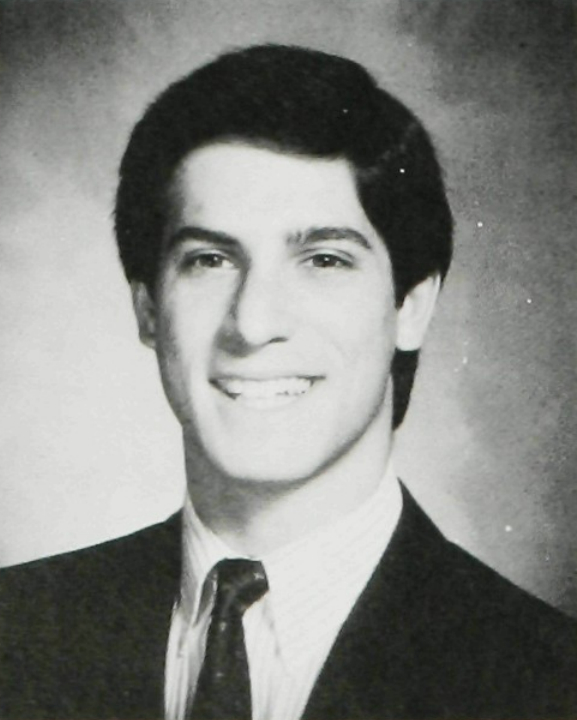
Hochman in the Brown University yearbook, 1985

Nathan Hochman was born to Bruce Hochman (1929–2011), a US Air Force veteran who was among the first graduating class of UCLA School of Law, and Harriet Hochman, who was an active non-profit leader in Los Angeles. His family is Jewish.

Hochman graduated from Beverly Hills High School in 1981, then earned his Bachelor's degree from Brown University (magna cum laude and Phi Beta Kappa) and his Juris Doctor degree from Stanford Law School. At SLS, he served as the Executive Editor of Stanford Journal of International Law.

After graduating, Hochman clerked for United States District Judge Stephen V. Wilson in Los Angeles. Soon after, Hochman became an Assistant US Attorney for the Central District of California. In that role, Hochman prosecuted over 180 cases in the criminal division, securing convictions against corrupt public officials, human and narcotics traffickers, money launderers, and more. Hochman also was the Environmental Crimes Coordinator for two years.

As an Assistant US Attorney, Hochman spearheaded the Los Angeles Disaster Fraud Task Force which was formed in the wake of the 1994 Northridge Earthquake and tasked with prosecuting criminals who defrauded the federal aid programs established for emergency relief.

Hochman was a principal at Hochman, Salkin, Rettig, Toscher & Perez, PC, a law firm founded by his father, Bruce I. Hochman. Hochman joined the firm of Bingham McCutchen, LLP in 2009 as a partner and then became a partner at Morgan, Lewis & Bockius LLP in 2014 when Bingham McCutchen combined with Morgan Lewis. At Morgan Lewis, he was the deputy chair of the White Collar Litigation and Government Investigations practice group. In 2019, Hochman joined the firm of Browne George Ross LLP in its Century City branch office. Hochman was currently general counsel at Ross LLP.

== United States Assistant Attorney General ==
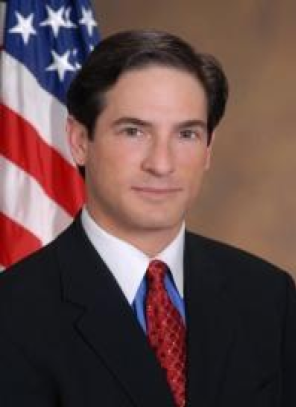
Hochman while serving as United States Assistant Attorney General in 2008

Hochman was appointed by President George W. Bush to serve as United States Assistant Attorney General, overseeing the Tax Division of the United States Department of Justice. He was unanimously confirmed by the United States Senate on December 19, 2007.

As head of the Tax Division, Hochman oversaw the US Government's efforts to enforce federal tax law, particularly focused on bringing justice to individuals involved in tax evasion, offshore tax sheltering, bankruptcy fraud, and overall tax fraud.

== Los Angeles Ethics Commission ==
Hochman was appointed by Los Angeles City Attorney Carmen Trutanich to serve on the Los Angeles City Ethics Commission and was confirmed unanimously by the Los Angeles City Council. His term ran from August 2011 to June 2016. The Los Angeles City Ethics Commission is responsible for administering city and state law with regards to political campaigns, lobbying, contracting, and governmental ethics. As an Ethics Commissioner, Hochman spearheaded a proposal to provide cash incentives to boost voter turnout in special elections in the City of Los Angeles. In 2014, he served as the president of the commission.

== Los Angeles County District Attorney ==
Hochman was sworn into District Attorney on December 3, 2024 by actor and former California governor Arnold Schwarzenegger. Immediately upon taking office, he revoked several of Gascón's policies which had restricted prosecutors from pursuing the death penalty, requesting sentencing enhancements, and filing charges for misdemeanors such as drug possession and public intoxication.

In July 2026, Hochman filed charges against LAPD officer Daniel Flores alleging that he violated the California Invasion of Privacy Act. Flores recorded LAPD officers making racist, homophobic and sexist comments and filed an internal affairs complaint.

=== Menendez brothers case ===
In a high profile decision made after his election, Hochman opposed a habeas corpus petition for Erik and Lyle Menendez requesting a new trial for the murder of their parents on the basis of claims that their father had sexually abused Erik, and also opposed resentencing of the brothers stating that they had not disavowed the false statements made about the crimes, thus withdrawing Gascón's original filing.

=== Rob and Michele Reiner case ===
On December 16, 2025, Hochman charged Nick Reiner with two counts of first-degree murder with a special circumstance of multiple murders involving his parents, Rob Reiner and Michele Singer Reiner.

=== Celeste Rivas Hernandez case ===
On April 20, 2026, Hochman charged pop singer David Anthony Burke, professionally known as D4vd, (Note: Pronounced "David".) with first-degree murder, continuous sexual abuse of a child under the age of 14, and unlawful mutilation of human remains, following Burke's arrest on April 16 on suspicion of murdering 14-year-old Celeste Rivas Hernandez after her remains were found in Burke's impounded Tesla in September 2025. The case includes special circumstances of murder of a witness, murder for financial gain, and lying in wait.

== Political campaigns ==
Hochman was the Republican nominee for the 2022 California Attorney General election, losing the election to Democrat Rob Bonta.

Hochman ran as an independent candidate for Los Angeles County District Attorney. In the March 5, 2024, primary, Hochman advanced to the general election against incumbent George Gascón. On November 5, 2024, Hochman was elected as the 44th District Attorney of Los Angeles County, taking over 59% of the vote.

== Personal life ==
Nathan Hochman is married to Vivienne Vella, and they have three children together. Hochman is an active community leader and volunteer, serving on the boards or holding leadership positions at Cedars Sinai Medical Center, the Jewish Federation Council of Greater Los Angeles, Stanford Law School, the Brandeis-Bardin Institute, the American Jewish University, the Legal Services Division of the United Jewish Fund, and the Jewish Community Foundation.

== Notes ==
Legal offices
| Preceded by Eileen O'Connor | United States Assistant Attorney General for the Tax Division; 2008–2009 | Succeeded by Kathryn Keneally |
| Preceded by George Gascón | District Attorney of Los Angeles County; 2024-present | Incumbent |
