= Myanna Dellinger =

Danish-American law professor

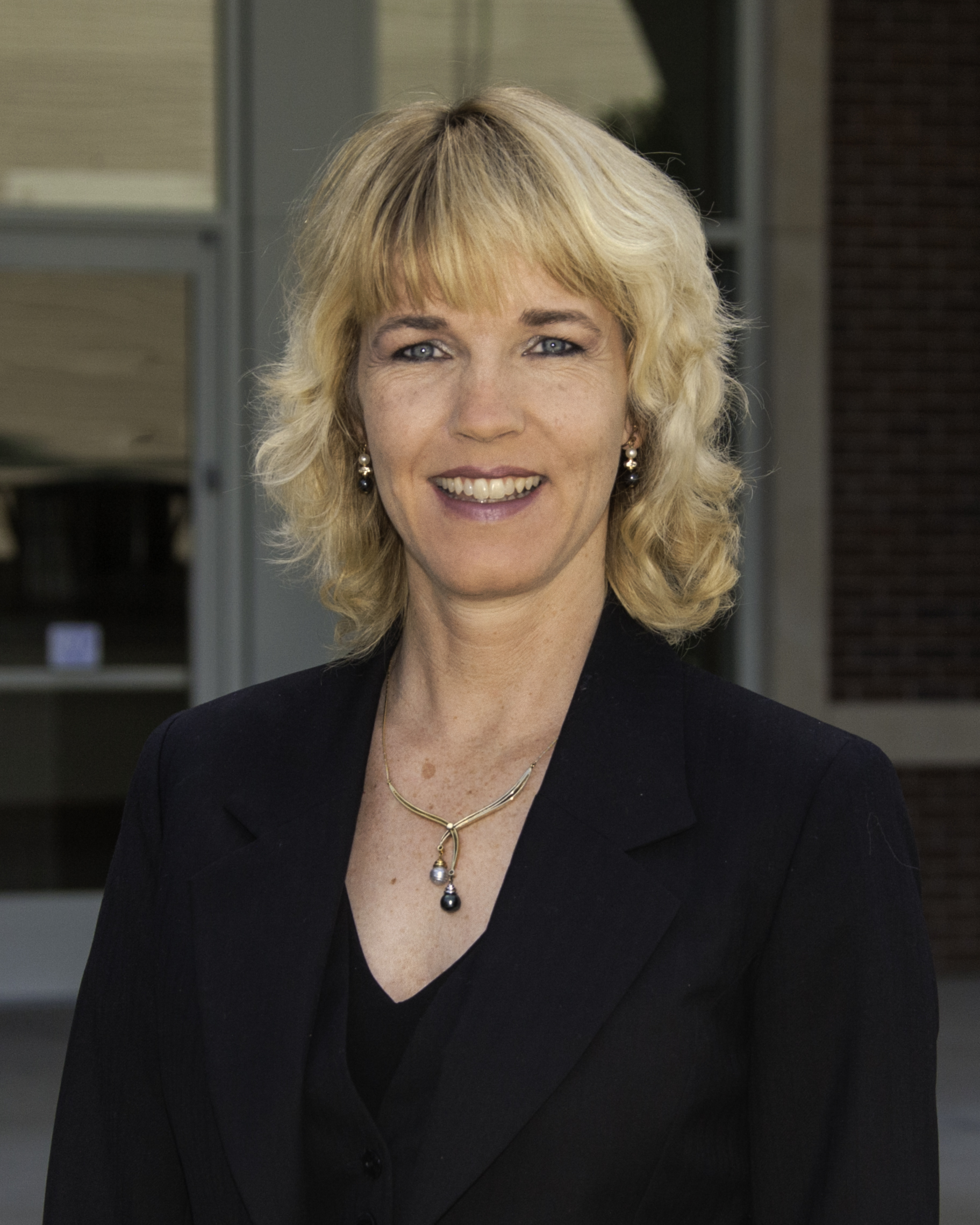
- Born: Aarhus, Denmark
- Education: Aarhus University (B.A., M.Sc.); University of Oregon School of Law (J.D.)
- Awards: Order of the Coif
- Scientific career
- Fields: International law, animal law, climate change law, human rights law, contract law
- Workplaces: University of South Dakota School of Law

Myanna Dellinger is a Danish-American law professor, climate change and international law specialist, and Fulbright Scholar.

== Early life ==
Myanna Dellinger was born and raised in Denmark. Her blue-collar parents only received seven years of education. Dellinger was the first member of her family to receive a university education. Her early life interests included reading and numerous outdoor activities such as horseback riding, bike riding, and learning about the environment.

== Education ==
Dellinger received B.A. and M.Sc. degrees from the Aarhus Business School, now Aarhus University, ranked in the top 100 by several influential rankings among over 17,000 universities world-wide. She studied law at the University of Oregon School of Law, graduating first in her class in 2008. She is currently a Ph.D. candidate in Political Science at the University of South Dakota, expecting to complete her dissertation in 2021.

== Career ==
=== International communications specialist ===
Myanna Dellinger enjoyed a successful first career in international communications. She taught English for Science and Technology at the master's degree level in Denmark as well as English as a Second Language for the University of California, Irvine and California State University, Long Beach. She also started, grew, and operated a localization and interpretation agency working with such clients as DreamWorks Pictures, Warner Bros. Studios, and major law firms in California, Texas, and New York. She personally translated and interpreted in projects such as multi-million-dollar patent infringement lawsuits, the Holocaust survivors class action lawsuit against Swiss banks, Shrek and Harry Potter.

=== Law clerk and law professor ===
After law school, Myanna Dellinger clerked for the late Hon. Frances J. D’Eramo of the United States Virgin Islands Superior Court and the late Hon. Procter Ralph Hug Jr., of the United States Court of Appeals for the Ninth Circuit. She proceeded to become a law professor at two different ABA-accredited California law schools before accepting a position as Professor of Law at the (also ABA-accredited) University of South Dakota Knudson School of Law. She specializes in human rights law, public and private international law, and business law. Her research focuses on climate change prevention as well as public and private financial liability for damages caused by extreme weather events. She has also written on the potential adverse effects of trophy hunting to threatened and endangered species.

=== Awards & research results ===
Myanna Dellinger earned the honorary title “Order of the Coif” by graduating in the top 10% of her law school class (she was number one). In 2016, Dellinger was awarded a Fulbright specialist grant in law to conduct research and to lecture at the Institute for Advanced Sustainability Studies in Potsdam, Germany. Dellinger later became a peer reviewer for the National Science Foundation. Dellinger's work has been cited by, among numerous others, American judges, the United Nations Economic Commission for Europe, the Finnish Ministry of Foreign Affairs, and the OECD. She has been on the top 10% of the most downloaded authors worldwide on SSRN since 2017.

== Diversity ==
Myanna is an immigrant from Denmark. She is fluent in English, Danish, and German. She is the first and only in her blue-collar family to earn several university degrees and obtain a career in academia. She took care of her terminally ill father while in law school and was the sole caregiver for her elderly mother in Denmark during Professor Dellinger's judicial election campaign, which she lost by only 0.8%. She got more than 1.6 million votes as the “outside” candidate for office. Myanna is a cancer survivor.

== Podcasts ==
Myanna Dellinger is the host and producer of The Global Energy & Environmental Law Podcast, a discussion of global and local environmental law issues. Produced by the University of South Dakota Knudson School of Law and the International Environmental Law Committee of the American Branch of the International Law Association.

== Selected works ==
- Electric Utility Wildfire Liability Reform in California, Environmental Law Reporter Vol #49 Issue #11 (2019)
- Post-Jesner Climate Change Litigation under the Alien Tort Statute, Vol. 44 no. S Colum. J. Envtl. L. 395 (2019)
- Trophy Hunting – A Relic of the Past, 42 J. Envtl. L. & Litig. 525 (2018)
- See You in Court: Around the World in Eight Climate Change Lawsuits, 42 Wm. & Mary Envtl. L. & Pol'y Rev. 525 (2018).
- Rethinking Force Majeure in Public International Law, 37 Pace L. Rev. 396 (2017).
- Acts of God or Acts of Man? Rethinking Contractual Impracticability in Times of Climate Change, Nat. Resources & Env't, Winter 2016, at 31.
- An "Act of God"? Rethinking Contractual Impracticability in an Era of Anthropogenic Climate Change, 67 Hastings L.J. 1551 (2016).
- Trophy Hunting Contracts: Unenforceable for Reasons of Public Policy, 41 Colum. J. Envtl. L. 395 (2016).
- Narrowed Constellations in a Supranational Climate Change Regime Complex: The "Magic Number" is Three, 37 Fordham Int'l L.J. 373 (2014).
- Rethinking Fuerza Mayor in a World of Anthropogenic Climate Change, 42 J. L. & Soc. Pontifica Universidad Católica Del Perú 45 (2014).
- An Unstoppable Tide: Creating Environmental and Human Rights Law from the Bottom Up, 15 Or. Rev. Int'l L. 63 (2013).
- Is California an Oil Boom State?, Orange County Law., May 2013, at 24
- Localizing Climate Change Action, 14 Minn. J. L. Sci. & Tech. 603 (2013)
- Ten Years of the Aarhus Convention: How Procedural Democracy Is Paving the Way for Substantive Change in National and International Environmental Law (2011)
- Using Dogs for Emotional Support of Testifying Victims of Crime, 15 ANIMAL L. 171 (2009)
- Airline Bailouts and Climate Change Re-Regulation, 47 N. KY. L. REV. 95 (2020
