= 2022 California Attorney General election =

- November 8, 2022
- Registered: 21,940,274
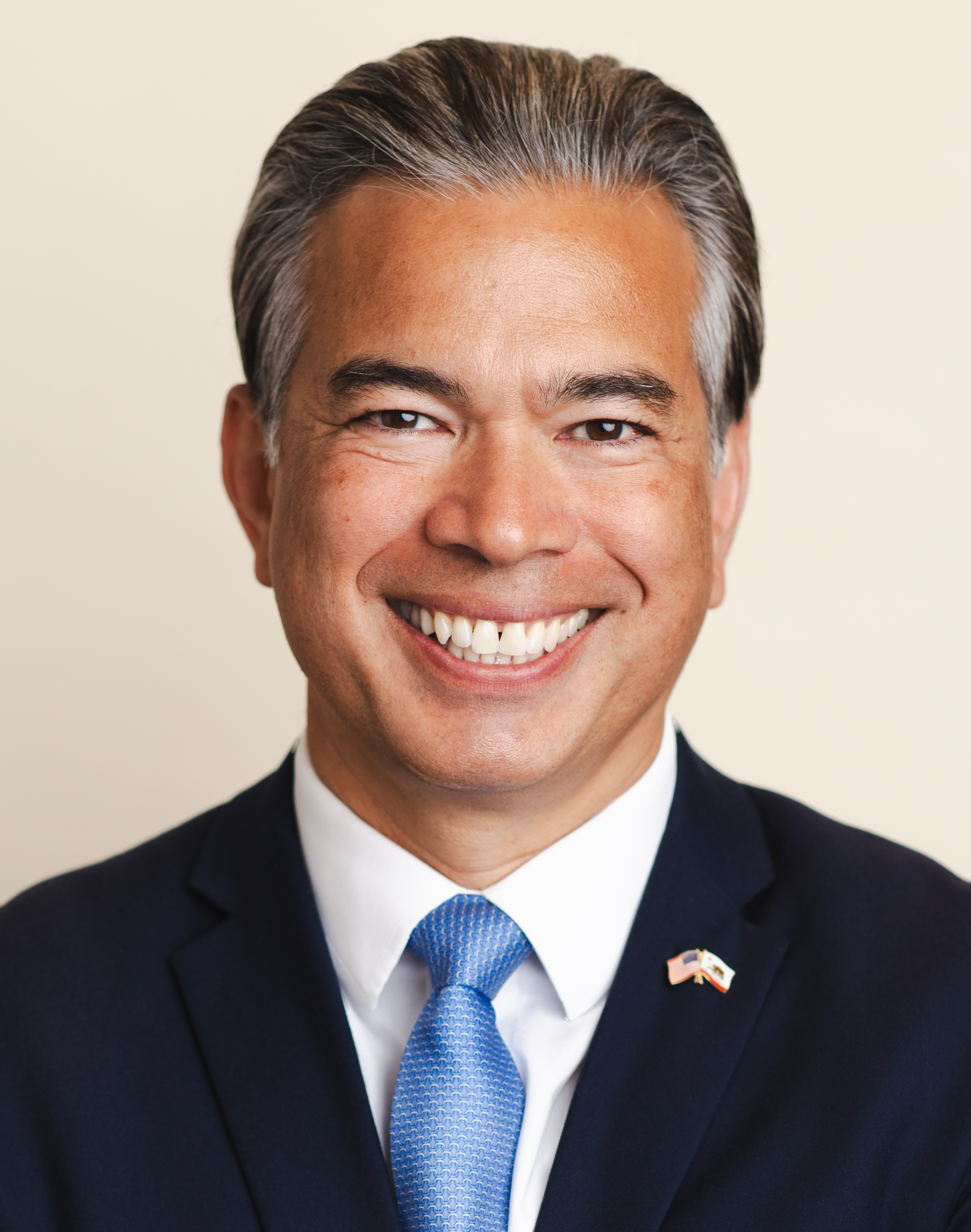

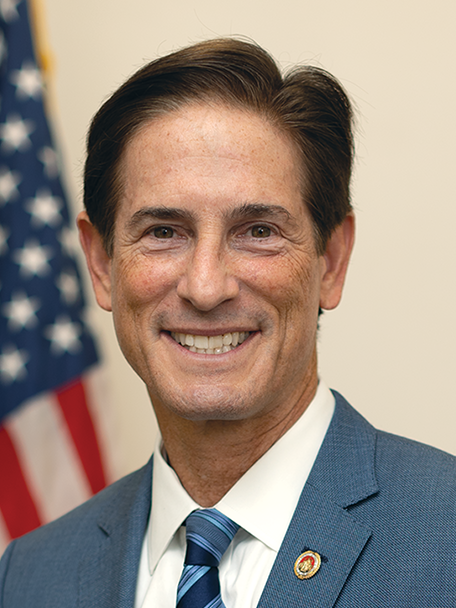
Candidate	Rob Bonta	Nathan Hochman
Party	Democratic	Republican
Popular vote	6,339,441	4,390,428
Percentage	59.08%	40.92%
- Bonta: 50–60% 60–70% 70–80% 80–90% Hochman: 50–60% 60–70% 70–80%
Attorney General before election
Rob Bonta
Democratic
Elected Attorney General
Rob Bonta
Democratic

The 2022 California Attorney General election was held on November 8, 2022, to elect the Attorney General of California. Incumbent Democratic Attorney General Rob Bonta was appointed to the office on April 23, 2021, following the resignation of Xavier Becerra to become the U.S. Secretary of Health and Human Services. Bonta won a full term.

== Candidates ==
A primary election took place on June 7, 2022. Under California law, all candidates appear on the same ballot under a nonpartisan blanket primary, with the top two finishers advancing to the general election.

=== Democratic Party ===
==== Advanced ====
- Rob Bonta, incumbent attorney general

==== Declined ====
- Ellen Corbett, former state senator from the 10th district (2006–2014)
- Lou Correa, U.S. Representative for California's 46th congressional district (running for re-election)
- Jeffrey F. Rosen, Santa Clara County district attorney (2011–present)
- Adam Schiff, U.S. Representative for California's 28th congressional district (running for re-election)

=== Republican Party ===
==== Advanced ====
- Nathan Hochman, former U.S. Assistant Attorney General

==== Eliminated ====
- Eric Early, candidate for attorney general in 2018, nominee for California's 28th congressional district in 2020

=== Green Party ===
==== Eliminated ====
- Dan Kapelovitz, candidate for governor in the 2021 recall election

=== No party preference ===
==== Eliminated ====
- Anne Marie Schubert, Sacramento County district attorney

== Endorsements ==
Rob Bonta (D)

Organizations

- California Correctional Peace Officers Association
- California Democratic Party
- California Teachers Association
- Democracy for America
- Giffords
- Stonewall Democrats
Nathan Hochman (R)

U.S. Representatives

- Michelle Steel, U.S. Representative for California's 48th congressional district (2021–present)
- David Valadao, U.S. Representative for California's 21st congressional district (2021–present)

Organizations

- California Republican Party
Dan Kapelovitz (G)

Organizations

- Green Party of California
- Peace and Freedom Party

== Primary election ==
=== Polling ===
Poll source	Date(s) administered	Sample size (Note: Key: A – all adults RV – registered voters LV – likely voters V – unclear)	Margin of error	Rob Bonta (D)	Eric Early (R)	Nathan Hochman (R)	Dan Kapelovitz (G)	Anne Marie Schubert (NPP)	Undecided
Berkeley IGS	May 24–31, 2022	3,438 (LV)	± 2.2%	46%	16%	12%	2%	6%	19%

=== Results ===
Results by county Bonta: 20–30%; 30–40%; 40–50%; 50–60%; 60–70%; 70–80%; Hochman: 30–40%; Early: 30–40%; 40–50%

Primary election results
Party	Candidate	Votes	%
Democratic	Rob Bonta (incumbent)	3,756,486	54.32%
Republican	Nathan Hochman	1,256,465	18.17%
Republican	Eric Early	1,142,747	16.52%
No party preference	Anne Marie Schubert	539,746	7.81%
Green	Dan Kapelovitz	219,912	3.18%
Total votes		6,915,356	100.0%

== General election ==
=== Predictions ===
Source	Ranking	As of
Sabato's Crystal Ball	Safe D	September 14, 2022
Elections Daily	Safe D	November 1, 2022

=== Polling ===
Poll source	Date(s) administered	Sample size	Margin of error	Rob Bonta (D)	Nathan Hochman (R)	Undecided
USC	October 30 – November 2, 2022	802 (RV)	± 3.5%	60%	40%	–

=== Results ===
2022 California Attorney General election
Party	Candidate	Votes	%	±%
Democratic	Rob Bonta (incumbent)	6,339,441	59.08%	−4.49%
Republican	Nathan Hochman	4,390,428	40.92%	+4.49%
Total votes		10,729,869	100.00%	N/A
Democratic hold				

==== By county ====
County	Rob Bonta Democratic		Nathan Hochman Republican		Margin		Total votes cast
County	#	%	#	%	#	%	Total votes cast
Alameda	375,961	78.25%	104,530	21.75%	271,431	56.49%	480,491
Alpine	362	59.44%	247	40.56%	115	18.88%	609
Amador	6,295	34.39%	12,008	65.61%	-5,713	-31.21%	18,303
Butte	32,130	45.64%	38,262	54.36%	-6,132	-8.71%	70,392
Calaveras	7,474	35.48%	13,592	64.52%	-6,118	-29.04%	21,066
Colusa	1,718	31.44%	3,746	68.56%	-2,028	-37.12%	5,464
Contra Costa	258,956	67.63%	123,969	32.37%	134,987	35.25%	382,925
Del Norte	3,335	40.47%	4,905	59.53%	-1,570	-19.05%	8,240
El Dorado	35,281	40.47%	51,900	59.53%	-16,619	-19.06%	87,181
Fresno	99,140	46.05%	116,137	53.95%	-16,997	-7.90%	215,277
Glenn	2,125	27.30%	5,660	72.70%	-3,535	-45.41%	7,785
Humboldt	29,902	63.14%	17,460	36.86%	12,442	26.27%	47,362
Imperial	16,794	56.65%	12,851	43.35%	3,943	13.30%	29,645
Inyo	3,349	45.87%	3,952	54.13%	-603	-8.26%	7,301
Kern	71,600	38.36%	115,065	61.64%	-43,465	-23.29%	186,665
Kings	9,780	36.78%	16,812	63.22%	-7,032	-26.44%	26,592
Lake	9,956	50.18%	9,883	49.82%	73	0.37%	19,839
Lassen	1,829	20.22%	7,216	79.78%	-5,387	-59.56%	9,045
Los Angeles	1,565,213	67.36%	758,529	32.64%	806,684	34.71%	2,323,742
Madera	13,450	36.86%	23,044	63.14%	-9,594	-26.29%	36,494
Marin	91,728	78.79%	24,696	21.21%	67,032	57.58%	116,424
Mariposa	3,020	38.89%	4,745	61.11%	-1,725	-22.22%	7,765
Mendocino	19,307	64.60%	10,579	35.40%	8,728	29.20%	29,886
Merced	25,847	47.42%	28,660	52.58%	-2,813	-5.16%	54,507
Modoc	782	23.34%	2,569	76.66%	-1,787	-53.33%	3,351
Mono	2,505	55.99%	1,969	44.01%	536	11.98%	4,474
Monterey	65,083	64.48%	35,851	35.52%	29,232	28.96%	100,934
Napa	31,919	64.93%	17,240	35.07%	14,679	29.86%	49,159
Nevada	27,111	54.09%	23,009	45.91%	4,102	8.18%	50,120
Orange	459,155	47.75%	502,408	52.25%	-43,253	-4.50%	961,563
Placer	73,946	41.57%	103,928	58.43%	-29,982	-16.86%	177,874
Plumas	3,288	38.85%	5,176	61.15%	-1,888	-22.31%	8,464
Riverside	274,884	47.78%	300,388	52.22%	-25,504	-4.43%	575,272
Sacramento	270,286	57.93%	196,326	42.07%	73,960	15.85%	466,612
San Benito	10,701	55.50%	8,581	44.50%	2,120	10.99%	19,282
San Bernardino	213,493	47.57%	235,265	52.43%	-21,772	-4.85%	448,758
San Diego	559,982	55.57%	447,711	44.43%	112,271	11.14%	1,007,693
San Francisco	246,762	83.49%	48,785	16.51%	197,977	66.99%	295,547
San Joaquin	88,236	50.25%	87,366	49.75%	870	0.50%	175,602
San Luis Obispo	60,975	51.86%	56,590	48.14%	4,385	3.73%	117,565
San Mateo	180,164	74.27%	62,431	25.73%	117,733	48.53%	242,595
Santa Barbara	78,520	60.10%	52,120	39.90%	26,400	20.21%	130,640
Santa Clara	366,414	68.90%	165,381	31.10%	201,033	37.80%	531,795
Santa Cruz	78,099	76.36%	24,182	23.64%	53,917	52.71%	102,281
Shasta	20,047	29.92%	46,959	70.08%	-26,912	-40.16%	67,006
Sierra	564	36.50%	981	63.50%	-417	-26.99%	1,545
Siskiyou	6,700	38.41%	10,745	61.59%	-4,045	-23.19%	17,445
Solano	78,952	60.97%	50,551	39.03%	28,401	21.93%	129,503
Sonoma	139,559	71.77%	54,882	28.23%	84,677	43.55%	194,441
Stanislaus	56,435	43.65%	72,858	56.35%	-16,423	-12.70%	129,293
Sutter	9,474	34.29%	18,155	65.71%	-8,681	-31.42%	27,629
Tehama	5,575	27.37%	14,791	72.63%	-9,216	-45.25%	20,366
Trinity	1,980	44.29%	2,491	55.71%	-511	-11.43%	4,471
Tulare	34,162	37.79%	56,240	62.21%	-22,078	-24.42%	90,402
Tuolumne	8,657	37.78%	14,255	62.22%	-5,598	-24.43%	22,912
Ventura	149,126	54.01%	126,958	45.99%	22,168	8.03%	276,084
Yolo	44,581	66.69%	22,270	33.31%	22,311	33.37%	66,851
Yuba	6,772	35.02%	12,568	64.98%	-5,796	-29.97%	19,340
Totals	6,339,441	59.08%	4,390,428	40.92%	1,949,013	18.16%	10,729,869

Counties that flipped from Democratic to Republican

- Fresno (largest municipality: Fresno)
- Merced (largest municipality: Merced)
- Orange (largest municipality: Anaheim)
- Riverside (largest municipality: Riverside)
- San Bernardino (largest municipality: San Bernardino)
- Stanislaus (largest municipality: Modesto)

==== By congressional district ====
Bonta won 38 of 52 congressional districts, with the remaining 14 going to Hochman, including two that elected Democrats.

District	Bonta	Hochman	Representative
1st	35%	65%	Doug LaMalfa
2nd	71%	29%	Jared Huffman
3rd	44%	56%	Kevin Kiley
4th	64%	36%	Mike Thompson
5th	39%	61%	Tom McClintock
6th	55%	45%	Ami Bera
7th	64%	36%	Doris Matsui
8th	74%	26%	John Garamendi
9th	49.5%	50.5%	Josh Harder
10th	64%	36%	Mark DeSaulnier
11th	84%	16%	Nancy Pelosi
12th	89%	11%	Barbara Lee
13th	47%	53%	John Duarte
14th	67%	33%	Eric Swalwell
15th	75%	25%	Jackie Speier (117th Congress)
15th	75%	25%	Kevin Mullin (118th Congress)
16th	71%	29%	Anna Eshoo
17th	69%	31%	Ro Khanna
18th	66%	34%	Zoe Lofgren
19th	65%	35%	Jimmy Panetta
20th	31%	69%	Kevin McCarthy
21st	52%	48%	Jim Costa
22nd	49.9%	50.1%	David Valadao
23rd	40%	60%	Jay Obernolte
24th	59%	41%	Salud Carbajal
25th	53%	47%	Raul Ruiz
26th	53%	47%	Julia Brownley
27th	49%	51%	Mike Garcia
28th	62%	38%	Judy Chu
29th	73%	27%	Tony Cárdenas
30th	75%	25%	Adam Schiff
31st	58%	42%	Grace Napolitano
32nd	65%	35%	Brad Sherman
33rd	55%	45%	Pete Aguilar
34th	81%	19%	Jimmy Gomez
35th	56%	44%	Norma Torres
36th	66%	34%	Ted Lieu
37th	85%	15%	Karen Bass (117th Congress)
37th	85%	15%	Sydney Kamlager-Dove (118th Congress)
38th	57%	43%	Linda Sánchez
39th	55%	45%	Mark Takano
40th	44%	56%	Young Kim
41st	45%	55%	Ken Calvert
42nd	67%	33%	Lucille Roybal-Allard (117th Congress)
42nd	67%	33%	Robert Garcia (118th Congress)
43rd	78%	22%	Maxine Waters
44th	70%	30%	Nanette Barragán
45th	48%	52%	Michelle Steel
46th	59%	41%	Lou Correa
47th	49%	51%	Katie Porter
48th	39%	61%	Darrell Issa
49th	50.1%	49.9%	Mike Levin
50th	60%	40%	Scott Peters
51st	59%	41%	Sara Jacobs
52nd	63%	37%	Juan Vargas

== See also ==
- 2022 United States attorney general elections
- 2022 California elections
