= Mesa Police Department =

- Abbreviation: MPD

Agency overview
- Employees: 1,364 (2022)
- Annual budget: $319 million (2025)

Jurisdictional structure
- Operations jurisdiction: Arizona, United States
- Population: 515,486 (2025)
- Legal jurisdiction: Mesa, AZ

Operational structure
- Agency executive: Dan Butler, Chief of Police

Website
- www.mesaaz.gov/residents/police

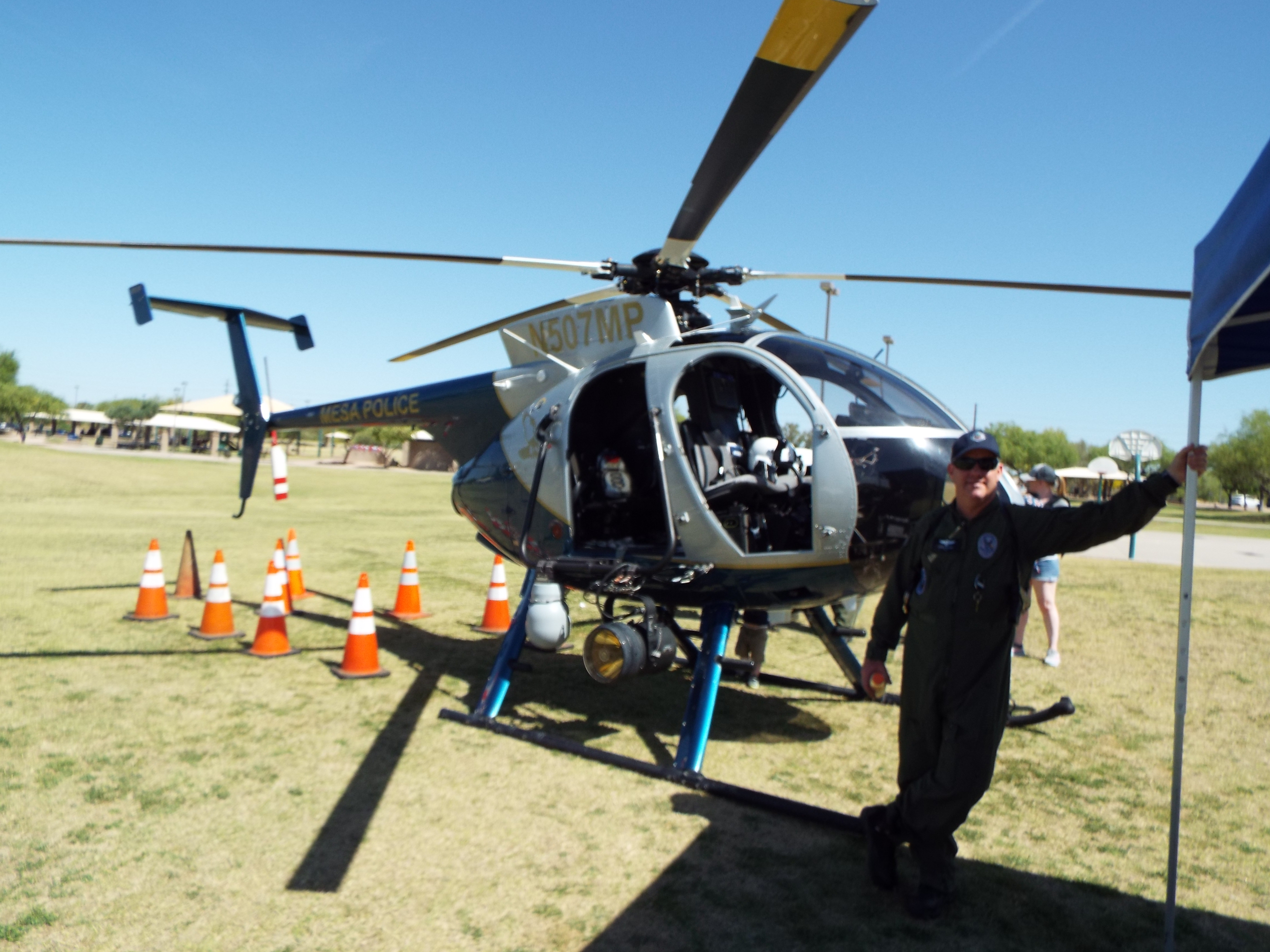
Mesa Police Department helicopter N507MP and pilot

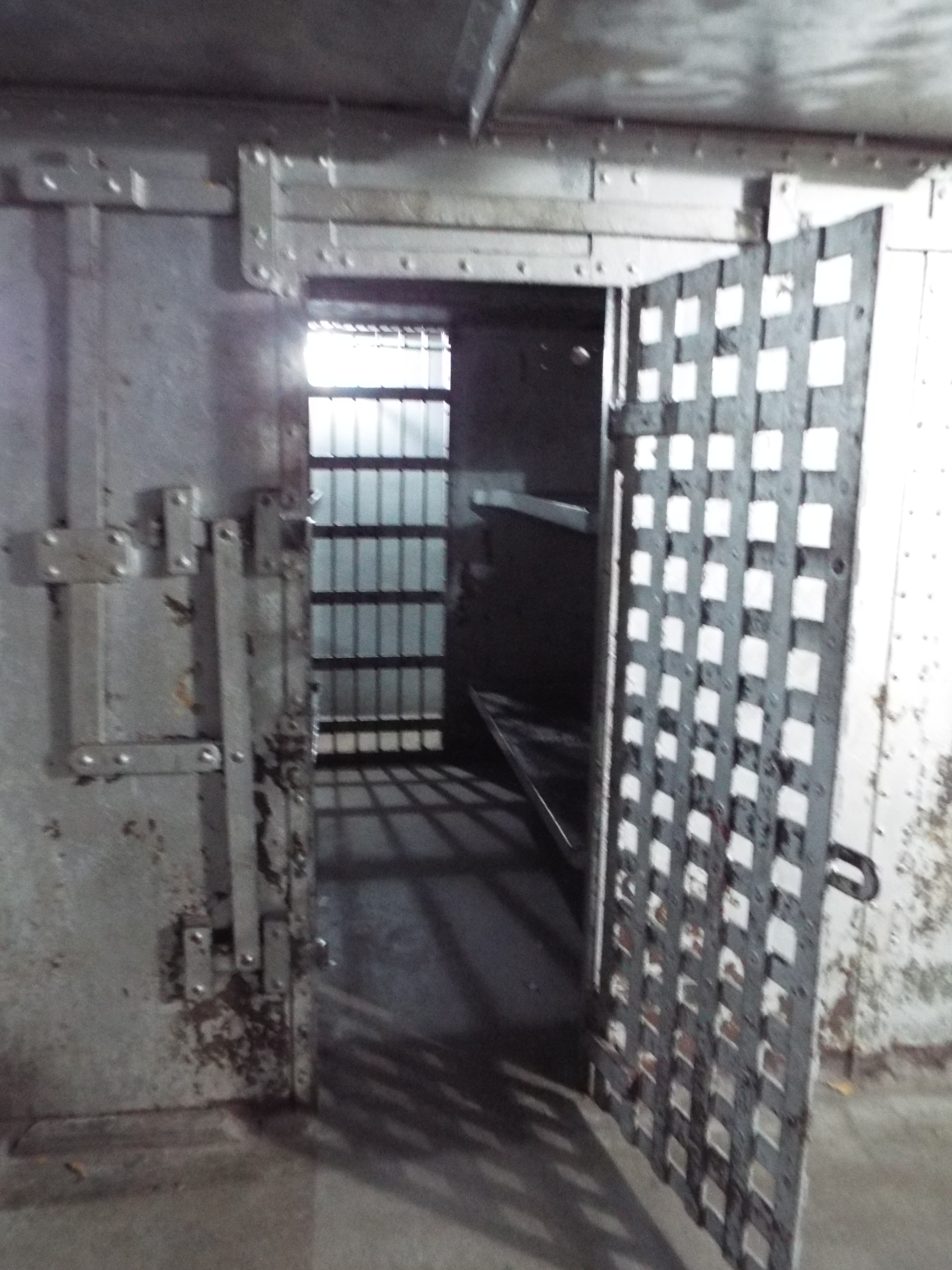
1884 Mesa Territorial Jail cell

The Mesa Police Department is the primary law enforcement agency in Mesa, Arizona. The department employs 832 sworn police officers and 532 professional staff. The department is headed by Chief Dan Butler.

== History ==
The Mesa police department has existed since 1880.

In 1991, local newspapers reported on a wide-ranging sex scandal in the department. Various police officers seem to have been involved in the molestation of children and using their wives as bait to blackmail other members of the department.

In 2016, a Mesa police officer, Philip Brailsford, shot Daniel Shaver five times and killed him in the hallway of a La Quinta Inn & Suites hotel in Mesa, while Shaver was on his hands and knees and following confusing and contradictory orders by the police. Brailsford was charged with second-degree murder and a lesser manslaughter charge, and found not guilty by a jury. Prosecutors argued the shooting was unjustified. Brailsford was reinstated in August 2018. Over a month later, he was granted retirement on medical grounds, as well as a pension of $2,500 per month.

Then-Chief Ramon Batista resigned suddenly in 2019 after an attempt at reforms in the police department policies and training.

A 2020 story by ABC News identified that "Mesa PD has a history of high-profile incidents involving excessive force" following the suspension of Officer Greg Clark. Assistant Chief Ed Wessing denied that problems existed in the force, while acknowledging that the public's trust was hurt.

== Organization ==
- Airport Unit operates at Phoenix-Mesa Gateway Airport
- Mesa PD Aviation Support Unit with two fixed-wing and three rotary-wing aircraft. The unit was established in 1986 and is based at Falcon Field Airport.
- Mesa PD Criminal Investigations Division
- Mesa PD SWAT/Tactical was established in 1975.

== Stations ==
The department currently operates out of four stations, with a fifth scheduled to open in the fall 2025:

- Headquarters and Central Division, 120 North Robson
- Fiesta Substation, 1010 West Grove Avenue
- Red Mountain Substation, 4333 East University Drive
- Superstition Substation, 2430 South Ellsworth Road
- Northeast Public Safety Facility, 1333 N Power Road (opens in fall 2025)
