= Los Angeles County Registrar-Recorder/County Clerk =

Agency overview
- Jurisdiction: Los Angeles County
- Headquarters: Norwalk, CA; 12400 Imperial Hwy. Norwalk, CA 90650
- Employees: Nearly 1,000 full-time employees
- Agency executive: Dean C. Logan, Registrar-Recorder/County Clerk
- Website: lavote.net

The Registrar-Recorder/County Clerk (RR/CC) is one of 37 departments in Los Angeles County, California which serves a population of over 10 million. The Registrar-Recorder/County Clerk is responsible for registering voters, maintaining voter files, administering federal, state, local and special elections and verifying initiatives, referendums and recall petitions. Los Angeles County is the largest and most complex county election jurisdiction in the country with over 500 political districts and 4.85 million registered voters. The Registrar-Recorder/County Clerk also records real property documents; maintains vital records of births, deaths and marriages; issues marriage licenses; performs civil marriage ceremonies; oversees countywide records management and archives programs and processes business filings and other documents.

== History ==
In January 1968, the Registrar of Voters and County Recorder were merged by the Los Angeles County Board of Supervisors. In 1991, 23 years later, the Los Angeles County Board of Supervisors decided to further merge the County Clerk with both the Registrar of Voters and the County Recorder. During this time, all three operations, and its 700 employees, were situated in separate facilities. It wasn't until June 1993, that the department merged all three operations to one single site, providing a permanent and secure headquarters for all the operations and documents.

== Registrar’s Office ==
The Los Angeles County Registrar's Office is responsible for the registration of voters, maintenance of voter files, conduct of federal, state, local and special elections and the verification of initiatives, referendums and recall petitions. Each year, the office participates in approximately 200 elections for schools, cities and special districts.

== Recorder’s Office ==
The Recorder's Office is responsible for recording legal documents that determine ownership of property, and maintaining birth, death, marriage and real estate records for Los Angeles County. All functions of the office are conducted under provisions of the State Constitution and State and County Codes. The recording operation in Los Angeles County serves the public and other County departments such as the Los Angeles County Assessor, Health Services, Public Social Services, and Regional Planning.

== County Clerk’s Office ==
On January 15, 1991, the Los Angeles County Board of Supervisors approved the transfer of the County Clerk title and functions that did not relate to judicial actions, procedures and records to the Registrar-Recorder. The major functions transferred include: marriage license issuance, the performance of civil marriage ceremonies, fictitious business name filings and indexing, qualification and registration of notaries, as well as miscellaneous statutory issuance of oaths and filings.

== Branch offices ==
- Norwalk (Headquarters)
- Van Nuys
- Lancaster
- Florence/Firestone
- East Los Angeles
- Beverly Hills
- LAX Courthouse
