= Jonathan Hatami =

American lawyer (born 1969)

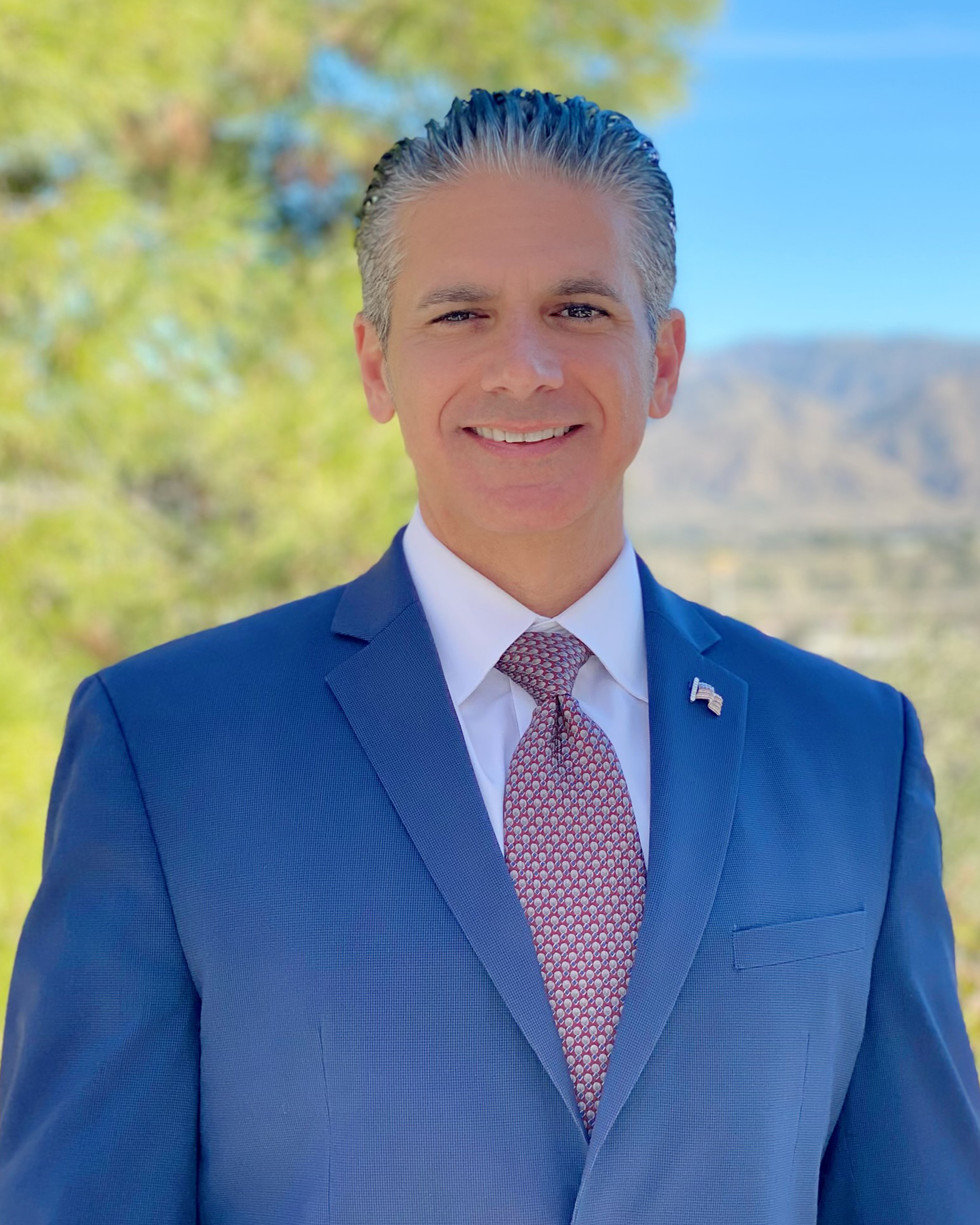

Personal details
- Born: Jonathan Amir Hatami; December 15, 1969 (age 56) New York City, New York, U.S.
- Party: Democratic
- Spouse: Roxanne
- Children: 2
- Education: Monterey Peninsula College (AS); California State University, Northridge (BA); University of Nebraska College of Law (JD)

Military service
- Allegiance: United States
- Branch/service: United States Army
- Years of service: 1989–1996
- Rank: Staff sergeant
- Unit: Infantry (11B); Military Police Corps (95B)

Jonathan "Jon" Amir Hatami (born December 15, 1969) is an American prosecutor who is a Deputy District Attorney in the Complex Child Abuse Section in the office of the Los Angeles County District Attorney. Hatami has prosecuted prominent child abuse cases, including the one depicted in the 2020 Netflix documentary The Trials of Gabriel Fernandez. On March 29, 2023, Hatami announced his 2024 campaign for Los Angeles County District Attorney in Whittier, California. On March 7, 2024, Hatami conceded that he had lost the district attorney's race after placing third in the primary election.

Hatami was born in Manhattan and raised in California. During that time, he was a victim of child abuse. After graduating from high school in 1989, he served in the United States Army for seven years, attaining the rank of staff sergeant. Hatami earned his Juris Doctor degree from the University of Nebraska College of Law. Hatami later returned to California to practice civil law and joined the Los Angeles County District Attorney's Office under District Attorney Steve Cooley.

== Early life and education ==
Jonathan Hatami was born on December 15, 1969, in New York City. His father was an immigrant from Iran, while his mother was born in Brooklyn, New York. While growing up, Hatami and his brother, Pete, suffered physical and verbal abuse at the hands of their father. Hatami's parents later separated and a custody battle ensued, with his mother initially granted temporary custody. Fearing that Hatami’s father would abduct the children and flee with them to Iran, Hatami’s mother flew them to Florida and left them in the care of a stranger, who also abused them. After approximately a month, their mother returned, and the family relocated to California. Hatami’s father searched extensively for the two children, contacting the NYPD, the FBI, among other organizations. Hatami and Pete were even listed as missing children in an edition of Ladies' Home Journal. The brothers' disappearance concluded in the early 1980s when they were recognized, leading to a reunion with their father.

Hatami graduated from Canyon High School in Santa Clarita, California.

== Career ==
=== Military service ===
After graduating from high school in 1989, Hatami enlisted in the United States Army as a private. He was honorably discharged in 1996. Hatami was in the infantry before transferring to the Military Police Corps, eventually attaining the rank of staff sergeant. He was largely stationed in South Korea but also served in Panama, Guantanamo Bay, during the 1991 Haitian refugee crisis, and Los Angeles during the 1992 Los Angeles riots.

=== Civil attorney ===
After completing his military service, Hatami returned to California and enrolled at the College of the Canyons, where he developed an interest in criminal justice. He transferred to California State University to complete his undergraduate degree. Hatami received a full scholarship to attend the University of Nebraska College of Law, graduating with a J.D. degree in 2002.

Following graduation, Hatami clerked for Judge Sievers of the Nebraska Court of Appeals for one year. He moved back to Los Angeles, California, to practice law as a civil attorney. When Hatami’s firm opened an office in New York, he practiced there for a year, then returned to California to continue his practice.

== Los Angeles County Deputy District Attorney ==
In 2006, after three years of practice as a civil attorney, Hatami applied for an opening in the Los Angeles County District Attorney’s office. He began working in East Los Angeles, then El Monte, and then Van Nuys before getting a permanent assignment in the Antelope Valley, Southern California. After working in the Antelope Valley, Hatami was transferred to the Complex Child Abuse Unit of the Family Violence Division in the District Attorney’s office in Downtown Los Angeles in 2016.

=== Murder of Gabriel Fernandez ===
On May 22, 2013, 8-year-old Gabriel Fernandez, covered in injuries, was rushed to Antelope Valley Hospital, then flown to Children’s Hospital Los Angeles. Two days later, he was declared brain dead and taken off life support. Gabriel’s mother, Pearl Fernandez, and her live-in boyfriend, Isauro Aguirre, were arrested and charged with Gabriel’s torture and murder.

In September 2017, the trials of Pearl Fernandez and Isauro Aguirre commenced, with Hatami and Deputy District Attorney Scott Yang leading the prosecution. After four months, Isauro Aguirre was found guilty of first-degree murder with a special circumstance of torture and was sentenced to death. Pearl Fernandez pleaded guilty to all charges and allegations, agreeing to waive all her appellate rights, in exchange for a sentence of life without the possibility of parole.

In April 2021, Pearl Fernandez applied to be re-sentenced under California Penal Code Section 1170.95. Pearl Fernandez’s petition was denied by Los Angeles Superior Court Judge George G. Lomeli in June 2021.

=== Murder of Anthony Avalos ===
In 2018, two weeks after the sentencing of Pearl Fernandez and Isauro Aguirre, Hatami received a call from an Antelope Valley Hospital nurse. The nurse told Hatami that what happened to Gabriel happened again to another boy. 10-year-old Anthony Avalos was found dead in the home of his mother, Heather Barron, and her live-in boyfriend, Kareem Leiva. Both Barron and Leiva were arrested and charged in the child’s torture and murder. Hatami described the case as "very disappointing, deflating, sad".

In 2023, Barron and Leiva were found guilty and sentenced to life imprisonment without the possibility of parole. Although the case originally qualified for the death penalty, the sentence was precluded by California governor Gavin Newsom's moratorium on capital punishment.

=== Death of Noah Cuatro ===
In 2019, four-year-old Noah Cuatro was found dead in his apartment. His parents claimed that he drowned in the pool of his apartment complex. Both Noah’s mother, Ursula Juarez, and father, Jose Cuatro, were arrested and charged with torturing, sexually assaulting, and murdering Noah. Hatami lead the prosecution of Juarez and Cuatro. The two were convicted and sentenced to 22 to life, and 32 to life, for Juarez and Cuarto respectively.

=== State law changes ===
As a Deputy District Attorney, Hatami helped change state law to provide increased restitution for victims of child sexual abuse in California through Hatami’s successful prosecution and conviction of Renoir Valenti in 2014.

==== California State Senate Bill 756 ====
In 2014, Renoir Valenti, an Antelope Valley youth soccer coach, was convicted of molesting 15 young boys over a period of 17 years. As a result of Valenti’s conviction in 2014, the 15 victims were awarded restitution by the court. In 2016, some of the victims were unable to receive restitution from the court due to a loophole in state law that does not allow child victims of sexual assault to receive restitution that would cover mental health services.

Hatami, along with the Los Angeles District Attorney and the Crime Victims Action Alliance, partnered with California State Senator Henry Stern to introduce a bill to change the law. California State Senate Bill 756 received support from law enforcement and district attorneys throughout the state of California. The bill also received unanimous approval from members of both the State Assembly and Senate. On July 21, 2017, Senate Bill 756 was signed into law by Governor Jerry Brown and took effect on January 1, 2018.

== Los Angeles County District Attorney ==
On March 29, 2023, Hatami announced his 2024 campaign for Los Angeles County District Attorney in Whittier, California. On March 7, 2024, Hatami conceded that he had lost the district attorney's race after placing third in the primary election.

== Personal life ==
Hatami is married to Roxanne, a sheriff’s detective in the Los Angeles County Sheriff’s Department, whom Hatami met in an Antelope Valley courtroom when Roxanne was a bailiff. They have two children and attend Lancaster Baptist Church.
