= Jackie Lacey =

American politician and Los Angeles County District Attorney (born 1957)

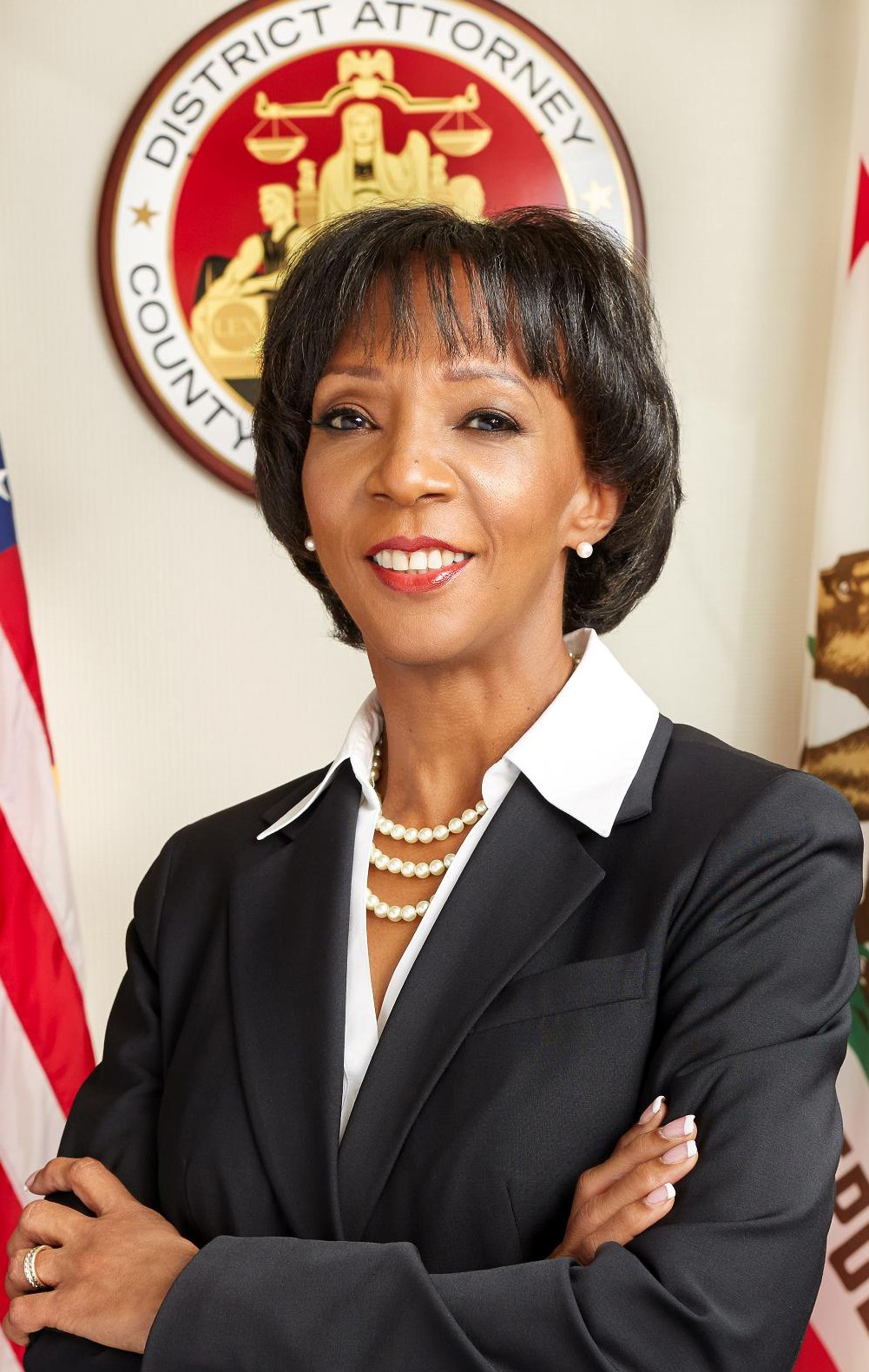

42nd District Attorney of Los Angeles County
- In office December 3, 2012 – December 7, 2020
- Preceded by: Steve Cooley
- Succeeded by: George Gascón

Personal details
- Born: Jacquelyn Phillips; February 27, 1957 (age 69) Los Angeles, California, U.S.
- Party: Democratic
- Spouse: David Lacey (m. 1980; died 2022)
- Children: 2
- Education: University of California, Irvine (BA); University of Southern California (JD)

Jacquelyn Phillips Lacey (born February 27, 1957) is an American politician who served as the District Attorney of Los Angeles County from December 3, 2012 to December 7, 2020. Lacey was the first woman, and first African-American, to serve as LA District Attorney since the office was created in 1850.

== Early life and education ==
Lacey was born in Los Angeles and raised in the Crenshaw neighborhood. Her father, Louis Phillips, was a City of Los Angeles Lot Cleaning employee, and her mother, Addie Phillips, was a garment factory worker. Lacey attended Dorsey High School, graduated from the University of California, Irvine with a degree in psychology in 1979, and graduated from the University of Southern California Law School in 1982.

== Professional career ==
Lacey joined the District Attorney's Office in 1986 as a deputy district attorney. Lacey prosecuted hundreds of criminal cases while serving as a deputy district attorney, including a successful prosecution of the first race-based hate crime murder in Los Angeles County. Lacey continued to move up through the ranks, taking on management and executive roles in the office in 2000. In 2011, she was named Chief Deputy District Attorney, the second-in-command to the District Attorney.

== Los Angeles County District Attorney ==
As LA county DA, Lacey has been described as "tough on crime". During her 2020 reelection campaign, that platform was contrasted with the criminal justice reform-minded platforms of her opponents. According to the New York Times, Lacey has "[resisted] efforts to more drastically reduce prison populations."

=== 2012 election ===
In June 2011, Lacey announced her candidacy for district attorney, hoping to succeed retiring incumbent Steve Cooley. In the June 2012 election, in what was considered a major upset, Lacey and criminal prosecutor Alan Jackson defeated Los Angeles City Attorney Carmen Trutanich, who was considered the favorite. Lacey and Jackson advanced to a November 2012 runoff election, which Lacey won with 55% of the vote.

Lacey was sworn in as district attorney on December 3, 2012 by outgoing attorney Steve Cooley, in a ceremony attended by former district attorneys Gil Garcetti, Robert Philibosian, and John Van de Kamp.

=== Industrial accidents and environmental crimes ===
In 2014, Lacey announced that she would implement a new program that sought to improve investigations of industrial accidents and environmental crimes to help the District Attorney's Office build a stronger case against potential violations of workplace and environmental safety laws. The program assembled a new unit consisting of more than a dozen members who are sent to the sites of accidents involving deaths, injuries and threats to the environment, immediately upon notification by first responders.

=== Launch of new units and office initiatives ===
In 2014, Lacey announced an alternative sentencing program aimed at diverting mentally ill, low-level offenders from jail into treatment. Those who complete the treatment and any court-imposed probation will have their pending criminal charges cleared from their records. The program was designed to reduce jail overcrowding and end a revolving door for offenders with mental illness who find themselves incarcerated for relatively minor crimes. In early 2019, Lacey launched the DA's first mental health division - the first for California and possibly United States - which seeks opportunities to expand treatment and other services for mentally ill inmates in the criminal justice system. The new division works with defendants who have been declared mentally incompetent to stand trial or who are seeking alternative sentences due to their mental illnesses. Jackie Lacey founded and serves as chair of the Criminal Justice Mental Health Project for Los Angeles County, leading a multidisciplinary working group devoted to diverting people who are mentally ill out of the criminal justice system for nonviolent offenses. The project secured $150 million in funding from LA County, ensured the opening of urgent care centers as an alternative to jail for certain arrestees, and helped create a new county office of diversion and re-entry.

In 2014, in partnership with the Rotary Club of Los Angeles, Lacey launched a campaign against scams targeting the elderly, in which volunteers would go to senior centers, nursing homes and other places seniors gather to give presentations about how to recognize and avoid scams, as well as pass out literature to home-bound seniors. Lacey also instituted the DA's bimonthly Fraud Alerts to educate the public about common fraud schemes targeting seniors, including counterfeit drug scams and Medicare rip-offs.

In 2015, Lacey announced the creation of the Conviction Review Unit, dedicated to pursuing the innocence claims of people imprisoned for serious felonies, if new evidence is discovered. When new evidence warrants it, a formal investigation is opened to review details of the case, and the case is presented to the Conviction Review Committee, who will decide whether they doubt the original conviction.

In 2017, Lacey launched the Notario Fraud Unit with the goal of prosecuting those involved in immigration service scams who pose as either attorneys, special agents, or government workers who could expedite the processing of legal documents. Since its inception, the Notario Fraud Unit has prosecuted eight major criminal cases.

=== Forgiveness of infractions ===
In April 2019, Lacey announced that Los Angeles County would collaborate with Code for America, a nonprofit tech organization, to identify decades-old court cases to reduce or expunge 50,000 marijuana convictions. The initiative is the result of Proposition 64, a 2016 measure that legalized marijuana possession in the state of California. As part of the measure, voters also approved erasing past marijuana-related convictions and authorizing re-sentencing for eligible offenders.

Additionally, in response to the homeless population being repeatedly ticketed and arrested for minor infractions, DA Jackie Lacey, City Attorney Mike Feuer, and LAPD Chief Michel Moore agreed to “unclog” the court system of more than 300,000 older warrants and citations. The plan, known as the Fugitive Misdemeanant Recovery Program, allows law enforcement and safety officials to focus on dangerous criminals instead of time on minor infractions involving the homeless.

=== Sexual abuse in the entertainment industry ===
Following multiple accusations of sexual abuse against high-profile entertainment figures, Lacey created a task force of prosecutors to deal with sexual abuse crimes in the entertainment industry. In January 2020, Lacey charged former film producer Harvey Weinstein with forcible rape, forcible oral copulation, sexual penetration by force, and sexual battery by restraint.

=== Capital punishment ===
Even after California Gov. Gavin Newsom announced a moratorium on capital punishment in California, Lacey pursued death penalty cases.

=== 2020 re-election ===
In June 2020, amid the George Floyd protests for criminal justice reform, Eric Garcetti, the incumbent Mayor of Los Angeles and Congressman Adam Schiff rescinded their prior endorsement of Lacey and endorsed her opponent George Gascón in the lead-up to the 2020 Los Angeles County District Attorney election. She lost to Gascón 53.53% to 46.47%.

== Criticism ==
=== Refusal to prosecute law enforcement ===
During her term, Lacey was heavily criticized by Black Lives Matter, the ACLU and others for failing to prosecute a single member of Los Angeles County law enforcement for murder. The criticism increased in March 2018 when Lacey refused to file charges against LAPD officer Clifford Proctor for shooting and killing Brendon Glenn three years earlier, despite LAPD Chief Charlie Beck recommending Lacey prosecute Proctor. In a statement after Lacey declined to file charges against Proctor, the ACLU of Southern California released a statement saying, in part:

Despite the hundreds of civilians that have been killed by police officers within Los Angeles during Lacey's tenure, not one officer has been charged with a crime. But even among this throng of victims, Brendon Glenn stands apart. If the evidence is clear enough for Chief Beck to take the extraordinary step of calling for prosecution of one of his own officers, what more does Lacey need? Her decision suggests that no matter how egregious an officer's conduct is, no matter the evidence she has before her, she does not intend to hold any officer accountable for unnecessarily and inexplicably shooting a member of the public.

=== Refusal to prosecute Ed Buck ===
Lacey was heavily criticized for refusing to prosecute Ed Buck, a wealthy Democratic Party donor, following the 2017 drug overdose death of a young Black man named Gemmel Moore in Buck's apartment. At the time, Los Angeles County Sheriff's deputies found "nearly two grams of methamphetamine, syringes and drug paraphernalia throughout the residence". Black and LGBTQ community activists and local attorneys called on Lacey to prosecute Buck, and Moore's family "provided authorities with substantial evidence, including the names of several other victims, that Buck engaged in a pattern of drugging, video-taping, and sexually assaulting black men."

Six months after Lacey declined to prosecute Ed Buck for Gemmel Moore's death, another Black man, Timothy Dean, was found dead of a drug overdose in Buck's apartment in January 2019. Activists renewed their calls to Lacey to prosecute Buck, but again she declined. In an October 2019 meeting of the Stonewall Democratic Club, a gay rights organization in Los Angeles, Lacey claimed that Sheriff's deputies' illegal search and seizure of evidence in Buck's residence at the time of Moore's death rendered the evidence inadmissible in court, and therefore "presented a challenge" to her efforts to prosecute. She did not respond to participants' criticism that deputies should not have taken legal advice from a coroner, as Lacey claimed they had.

Ed Buck was arrested in September 2019 following a 911 call by a young Black man who was experiencing an overdose of methamphetamine administered by Buck. The man was taken to a hospital and survived. Lacey's office then charged Buck with "one felony count each of battery causing serious injury, administering methamphetamine and maintaining a drug house."

In spite of Buck's eventual arrest and prosecution, Black and LGBTQ activists in Los Angeles have continued to protest Lacey, her office, and the lengthy delay in charging Buck. In February 2020, the Los Angeles New Frontier Democratic Club, “the oldest and largest African American Democratic club in the state of California”, declined to endorse Lacey's reelection. Rep. Maxine Waters of Los Angeles and California's junior U.S. Senator Kamala Harris, both Black women, endorsed Lacey's opponent, former San Francisco District Attorney George Gascón, in their November 2020 runoff, and Black Lives Matter activists have protested outside Lacey's home in March, June, and July 2020.

=== Celebrity cases ===
Lacey has been criticized for not charging Bikram Choudhury criminally: there is a "reluctance of the district attorney to go after powerful men" as described in Netflix's 2019 documentary film, Bikram: Yogi, Guru, Predator, despite numerous women coming forward with allegations of sexual assault and rape. Her office has refused to comment publicly on their lack of action on this matter. Choudhury fled the country after receiving an arrest warrant.

Lacey has similarly been criticized for inaction in the case of four women who report having been raped by actor Danny Masterson.

=== Campaign contributions from law enforcement unions ===
In June 2020, a group of high-profile prosecutors from California's most heavily populated counties, lobbied the California State Bar to prohibit District Attorneys from accepting donations from law enforcement unions, citing the possible conflicts of interest with respect to how district attorneys investigate, prosecute, or interact with police officers. Lacey has publicly opposed this proposed prohibition. During the 2020 Los Angeles County District Attorney primary election, law enforcement unions had contributed over 75% of the $2.2 million raised by Lacey. Lacey ultimately won a plurality of votes in the race, given broad financial support from these law enforcement unions, including Association for Los Angeles Deputy Sheriffs (ALADS) and Los Angeles Police Protective League (LAPPL).

== Personal life ==
Lacey lived in the Granada Hills neighborhood with her husband, David Lacey, until his death in 2022. They had two adult children, Kareem and April. Lacey's husband David wielded a gun on March 2, 2020, when protesters came to their home to call for her resignation and knocked on their door. He was subsequently charged with three counts of assault with a firearm by the California Attorney General's Office but the charge was dismissed after he completed a diversion program.

Legal offices
Preceded by Steve Cooley	District Attorney of Los Angeles; 2012–present	Incumbent
