= Killing of Kate Steinle =

2015 homicide in San Francisco

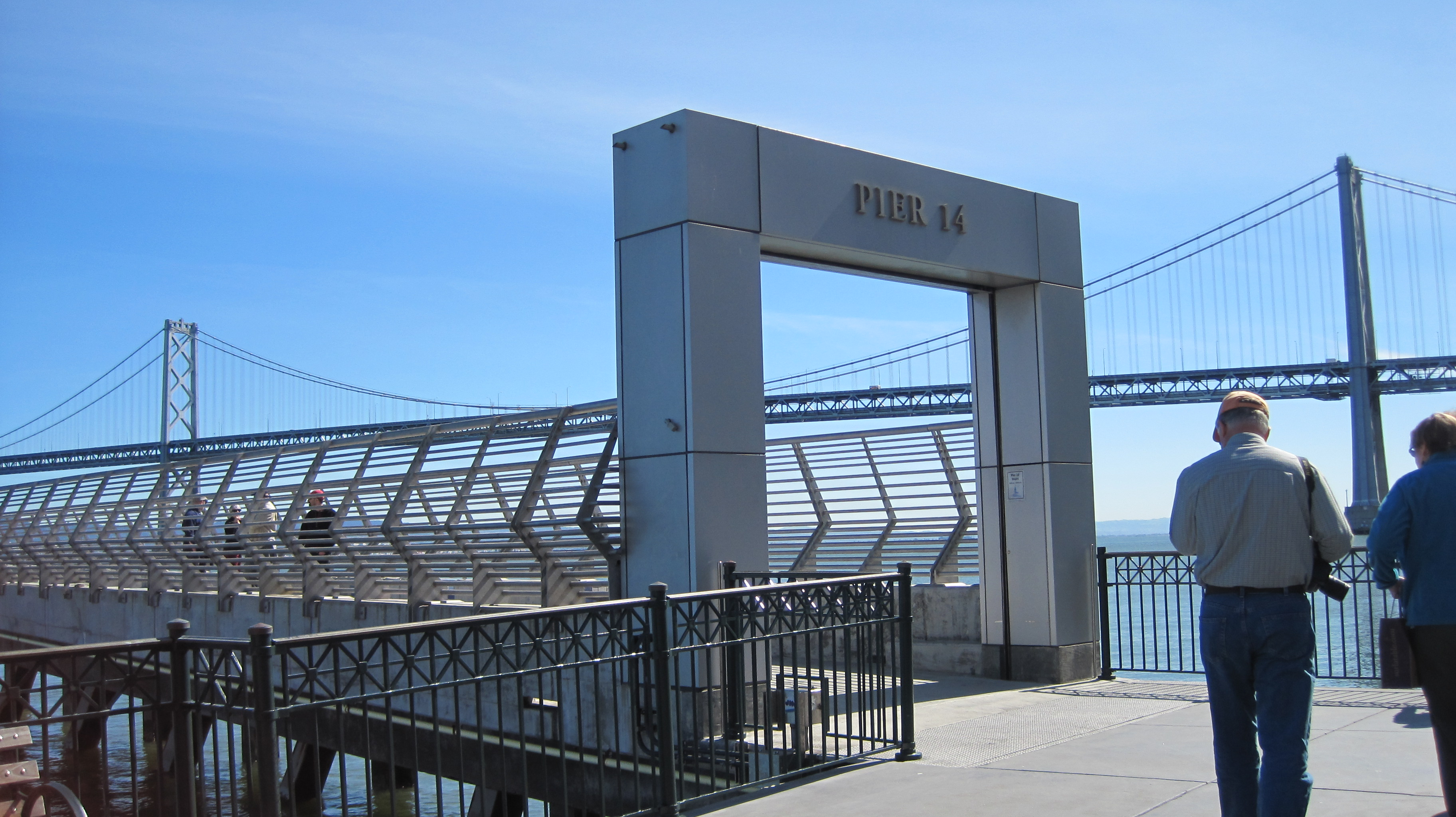
- Pier 14, site of the shooting

- Killing of Kate Steinle (San Francisco) Location of the incident
- Date: July 1, 2015
- Time: 6:30 p.m.
- Location: Pier 14, San Francisco, California, United States
- Type: Accidental homicide by shooting
- Deaths: Kathryn Michelle "Kate" Steinle, aged 32
- Accused: José Inez García Zárate (AKA Juan Francisco López-Sánchez)
- Charges: State charges: First-degree murder (dropped); Second-degree murder; Involuntary manslaughter; Being a felon in possession of a firearm; Federal charges: Involuntary manslaughter (dropped); Assault with a deadly weapon (dropped); Being a felon in possession of a firearm
- Verdict: State charges: Not guilty of second-degree murder and involuntary manslaughter; Guilty of being a felon in possession of a firearm (overturned); Federal charges: Pleaded guilty to being a felon in possession of a firearm
- Sentence: 7 years in jail
- Weapon: .40-caliber SIG Sauer P239 handgun

On July 1, 2015, 32-year-old Kathryn "Kate" Steinle was shot and killed while walking with her father and a friend along Pier 14 in the Embarcadero district of San Francisco. She was hit in the back by a single bullet. The man who fired the gun, José Inez García Zárate, said he had found it moments before, wrapped in cloth beneath a bench on which he was sitting, and that when he picked it up the weapon went off. The shot ricocheted off the concrete deck of the pier and struck the victim, who was about 90 feet (27 m) away. Steinle died two hours later in a hospital as a result of her injuries.

On November 30, 2017, after five days of deliberations, a jury acquitted García Zárate of all murder and manslaughter charges, and federal manslaughter and assault charges were dropped due to lack of evidence. He was convicted of being a felon in possession of a firearm, but that conviction was overturned on appeal on August 30, 2019.

García Zárate's immigration status made the shooting controversial and led to political discussion around San Francisco's status as a sanctuary city. García Zárate, an illegal immigrant, residing in the United States had previously been deported five times. Donald Trump, at the time a presidential candidate, cited García Zárate in support of his proposal to deport criminal illegal immigrants living in the United States, and mentioned Steinle during his acceptance speech at the 2016 Republican National Convention. Steinle's family has publicly requested that her death not be politicized.

== Killing ==
García Zárate told ABC station KGO-TV in a jailhouse interview that he started wandering on Pier 14, a tourist attraction area at the Embarcadero waterfront district, Wednesday July 1, 2015, after taking sleeping pills he found in a dumpster. He said he then picked up a gun that he found. García Zárate fired one shot from a .40-caliber SIG Sauer P239 handgun with a seven-cartridge magazine. One bullet struck Steinle in the back and pierced her aorta. She collapsed to the pavement while screaming to her father, who was accompanying her at the pier, for help. Her father and others performed CPR on Kathryn before paramedics arrived and took her to an ambulance. She died two hours later at San Francisco General Hospital.

García Zárate was arrested about an hour after the shooting at Pier 40, about one mile (1.6 km) south of Pier 14, and divers from the San Francisco Police Department Underwater Recovery Unit found the gun in the bay alongside Pier 14 the following day. On July 5, 2015, investigators returned to the pier and found a point 12–15 feet (3.7–4.6 m) from García Zárate's presumed location where a bullet had ricocheted off of the concrete. Following his arrest, García Zárate was booked into San Francisco County Jail on suspicion of murder.

The gun used by García Zárate had been stolen in downtown San Francisco from a Bureau of Land Management ranger's personal vehicle on June 27, 2015, according to the Bureau of Land Management. The ranger, John Woychowski, testified at trial that he had left the weapon holstered in a backpack under the front seat of his personal vehicle while he went to dinner with his family. The car's window had been broken.

== Victim ==
Kathryn Michelle "Kate" Steinle (December 13, 1982 – July 1, 2015) was originally from Pleasanton, California, grew up in Germany and graduated from Amador Valley High School. She earned a communications degree from California Polytechnic State University, San Luis Obispo. She was employed at Medtronic in San Francisco and was living on Beale Street, close to Pier 14, the site of the shooting. Her funeral was held at a winery in Pleasanton on July 9.

== Accused ==
José Inez García Zárate (or Juan Francisco López-Sánchez), of Guanajuato, Mexico, is an illegal immigrant who was deported from the U.S. a total of five times, most recently in 2009. He was on probation in Texas at the time of the shooting. He had seven non-violent felony convictions. When he was apprehended, discrepancies in García Zárate's age had him listed as 45 years old by police, but as 52 in jail records.

García Zárate arrived in the U.S. sometime before 1991, in the same year he would be convicted of his first drug charge in Arizona. He worked in Washington state in roofing and construction, and would also be convicted three times for felony heroin possession and manufacturing narcotics. Following another drug conviction and jail term in Oregon, the U.S. Immigration and Naturalization Service (INS) deported García Zárate in June 1994. However, García Zárate returned to the U.S. within two years and was convicted again of heroin possession in Washington state. He was subsequently deported for the second time in 1997.

On February 2, 1998, García Zárate was deported for the third time, after reentering the U.S. through Arizona. United States Border Patrol caught him six days later at a border crossing, and a federal court sentenced García Zárate to five years and three months in federal prison for unauthorized reentry. Immigration and Customs Enforcement (ICE), successor of the INS, deported García Zárate in 2003 for his fourth deportation. However, he reentered the U.S. through the Texas border and got another federal prison sentence for reentry before being deported for the fifth time in June 2009.

Less than three months after his fifth deportation, García Zárate was caught attempting to cross the border in Eagle Pass, Texas. He pleaded guilty to felony reentry; upon sentencing, a federal court recommended García Zárate be placed in "a federal medical facility as soon as possible".

On March 26, 2015, at the request of the San Francisco Sheriff's Department (SFSD), United States Bureau of Prisons (BOP) had turned García Zárate over to San Francisco authorities for an outstanding drug warrant. San Francisco officials transported García Zárate to San Francisco County Jail on March 26, 2015, to face a 20-year-old felony charge of selling and possessing marijuana after García Zárate completed his latest prison term in San Bernardino County for entering in the country without the proper documents.

U.S. Immigration and Customs Enforcement (ICE) had issued a detainer for García Zárate requesting that he be kept in custody until immigration authorities could pick him up. However, as a sanctuary city, San Francisco's "Due Process for All" ordinance restricted cooperation with ICE to only cases where the immigrant had both current violent felony charges and past violent felony convictions; therefore, San Francisco disregarded the detainer and released him. He was released from San Francisco County Jail on April 15, 2015, and had no outstanding warrants or judicial warrants, as confirmed by the San Francisco Sheriff's Department.

== Legal proceedings ==
García Zárate was formally charged with first-degree murder and possession of illegal narcotics on July 6. García Zárate admitted in a KGO-TV interview that he committed the shooting but said he found the gun wrapped in a T-shirt under a bench after taking sleeping pills he found from a trash can. He first claimed that he was aiming at sea lions, then that the gun had fired while he was picking up the wrapped package, and that Steinle's shooting was accidental. During a pretrial hearing, a judge disallowed the interview to be used as evidence. García Zárate pleaded not guilty to the charges, and was held on $5-million bail. García Zárate's attorney, Matt Gonzalez, stated in court that the shooting was likely accidental.

On July 28, prosecutors filed an additional charge against García Zárate: being a felon in possession of a firearm. On September 4, San Francisco Superior Court Judge Brendan Conroy stated that there was enough evidence to try García Zárate. Initially charged with first-degree murder, García Zárate was eventually tried for second-degree murder. If found guilty of the charges of second-degree murder, being a felon in possession of a firearm, and an enhancement of using a firearm, García Zárate could have faced life in prison without the possibility of parole. The jury also had the option of deciding if he was guilty of involuntary manslaughter (where the death occurs without intent but "through the negligent or reckless actions of the defendant").

In August, a judge set December 2 as the date to assign the case to a judge for trial. García Zárate's public defender said there were no discussions of a plea deal. However, the trial date set for December 2016 was postponed. García Zárate returned to court July 14, 2017. The trial was postponed again on July 25, but the defendant asserted his right to a speedy trial, meaning that the trial was required to begin within 60 days.

The trial began October 23, 2017, with opening statements and a brief testimony from Steinle's father. On subsequent days, jurors heard testimonies from eyewitnesses of the shooting, local investigators and the BLM ranger whose stolen gun was used in the crime. Police revealed how they had lied to García Zárate in order to motivate him to confess to the shooting by saying that they had more evidence than had actually been collected at the time. The prosecution contended he brought the stolen gun to the crime scene while the defense claimed the weapon was found under a Pier 14 seat.

The defense called its first witness, the crime lab supervisor, after the prosecution rested its case after two weeks of testimony. Their case was that the shooting was accidental and occurred when García Zárate picked up the newly found gun. Experts regarding video enhancement and Spanish translation were heard to bolster the claim of an accidental shooting and incomplete investigation.

A key point of contention was the ease with which the weapon could have been fired accidentally. A supervising criminologist at the San Francisco Police Department crime lab testified that the gun was in excellent condition and would not have fired without someone pulling the trigger. The defense emphasized that the Sig Sauer pistol has no external safety mechanism to prevent accidental firing, and pointed to a record of even police trained in the use of Sig Sauer pistols having made accidental discharges. As examined by the criminologist, it was placed in single-action mode (where the hammer is cocked), rather than double-action mode (where a single pull of the trigger both cocks and releases the hammer). While it is typical for a gun that has been fired to be in single-action mode, a gun in single-action mode also requires less trigger pressure to fire. The defense argued that this made it more plausible that García Zárate could have pulled the trigger accidentally while picking up or unwrapping the bundled gun. Woychowski, a BLM ranger, testified that he always left the pistol in double-action mode, but that he typically loaded it in single-action mode, and couldn't definitively say that he had returned it to double-action mode before it was stolen. The defense rested its case after four days.

Prior to closing arguments, Judge James Feng agreed to a request by the prosecutor Diana Garcia to instruct the jury in first-degree murder, second-degree murder, and involuntary manslaughter. "The jury will be instructed on multiple theories of homicide," said District Attorney's Office spokesman Alex Bastian.

Jury deliberations began after 12 days of testimony, dozens of witnesses and two days of closing arguments on November 21, 2017.

On November 30, 2017, after five days of deliberations, the jury acquitted García Zárate of all murder and manslaughter charges, but convicted him of being a felon in possession of a firearm.

The Department of Justice unsealed a federal arrest warrant for García Zárate following his trial. The charges include felon in possession of a firearm, involuntary manslaughter, and assault with a deadly weapon. There is an existing federal detainer for García Zárate to be transported to the Western District of Texas by U.S. Marshals.

On January 11, 2019, García Zárate filed an appeal of his felon in possession conviction in the First Appellate District of the California Court of Appeal.

On August 30, 2019, the California state 1st District Court of Appeals overturned the gun conviction saying "the judge failed to instruct the jury on one of his defenses".

On June 6, 2022, García Zárate was sentenced by California federal judge Vince Chhabria to the seven years he's already spent in jail, legally closing the case. Before sentencing, Chhabria stated, "If you return to this country again and you are back in front of me, I will not spare you. Let this be your last warning: do not return to this country." García Zárate will be sent to Texas, where in federal court he will undergo deportation proceedings.

=== Investigation ===
The gun used in the shooting was confirmed by forensic crime laboratory technicians to be the same one stolen from a federal agent's car. The .40-caliber handgun had been taken from a U.S. Bureau of Land Management (BLM) ranger's car that was parked in downtown San Francisco, on June 27, 2015. The ranger, John Woychowski, was in San Francisco for an official government business trip. He testified at trial that he had left the weapon holstered in a backpack under the front seat of his personal vehicle while he went to dinner with his family. Woychowski immediately reported the theft to San Francisco police, as well as the Federal Bureau of Investigation's National Crime Information Center. Police issued a citywide crime alert but did not call in CSI technicians to examine the scene.

Ballistics experts for both the prosecution and defense agreed with the investigators finding that, after García Zárate fired the gun, the bullet ricocheted off the pavement 12–15 feet (3.7–4.6 m) away from him before traveling another 78 feet (24 m) and striking Steinle.

=== Family lawsuit ===
In September 2015, the Steinle family announced their intention to file a lawsuit against the City of San Francisco, Immigration and Customs Enforcement, and the Bureau of Land Management, alleging complicity and negligence in the death of their daughter. On January 7, 2017, Magistrate Judge Joseph C. Spero dismissed the family's claims against San Francisco and former Sheriff Ross Mirkarimi. The magistrate also dismissed their claim against ICE, but he ruled that the lawsuit accusing the Bureau of Land Management of negligence could proceed.

In January 2020, the United States Court of Appeals for the Ninth Circuit ruled that Steinle's family could not sue the city of San Francisco.

== Reaction ==
The killing sparked fierce criticism and political debate over San Francisco's sanctuary city policy, which disallows local officials from questioning a resident's immigration status. Multiple Republican presidential candidates, including Donald Trump and Jeb Bush, made statements blaming the immigration policy for Steinle's death; Trump further called for the need for a secure border wall. White House Press Secretary Josh Earnest stated that the U.S. would be safer if Republican lawmakers had approved comprehensive immigration reform backed by President Barack Obama.

2016 U.S. presidential candidate Hillary Clinton joined California Senator and former San Francisco Mayor Dianne Feinstein, a Democrat, in condemning the policy. Clinton said, "The city made a mistake, not to deport someone that the federal government strongly felt should be deported ... So I have absolutely no support for a city that ignores the strong evidence that should be acted on." That same week, Feinstein penned a public letter to San Francisco Mayor Ed Lee that stated, "The tragic death of Ms. Steinle could have been avoided if the Sheriff's Department had notified ICE prior to the release of Mr. Zarate, which would have allowed ICE to remove him from the country."

=== Local and state reaction ===
San Francisco County Sheriff Ross Mirkarimi received criticism by anti-illegal immigration activist groups, including Californians for Population Stabilization, and a range of politicians, including San Francisco Mayor Ed Lee and California U.S. Senator Dianne Feinstein, for García Zárate's release from custody before the shooting. Lee stated the sanctuary city ordinance allows the sheriff to coordinate with federal immigration and ICE agents. On July 7, Feinstein stated that the San Francisco County Sheriff's Department should have notified ICE before García Zárate was released, so that he could be deported from the country. In a press conference held on July 10, Mirkarimi blamed federal prison and immigration officials for the series of events that led up to the release of García Zárate.

Ross Mirkarimi lost his bid for re-election to Vicki Hennessy on November 3, 2015, receiving 38% of the vote.

=== Political reactions ===
The Donald Trump presidential campaign for the 2016 election released the political advertisement "Act of Love", showing García Zárate and criticizing rival Jeb Bush's policy on illegal immigration. Later, when accepting the Republican nomination for president at the 2016 Republican National Convention, Trump mentioned Steinle's death as a rationale to deport illegal aliens in the United States. After the 2017 Presidential Inauguration, President Trump again mentioned Steinle and other victims of violent crime by illegal aliens when creating the Victims of Immigration Crime Engagement (VOICE) Office within ICE.

=== Kate's Law ===
In response to the controversy, U.S. Senator Ted Cruz from Texas and U.S. Representative Matt Salmon from Arizona introduced H.R. 3011, the Establishing Mandatory Minimums for Illegal Reentry Act of 2015, also known as Kate's Law. No vote was ever held. In July 2015, however, the House did pass the Enforce the Law for Sanctuary Cities Act (H.R. 3009), a related bill that is often confused with Kate's Law.

Members of Steinle's family did not want her to be in the middle of a political controversy, according to the San Francisco Chronicle. "I don’t know who coined 'Kate’s Law,'" Kate's father Jim Steinle told the paper. "It certainly wasn't us."

In July 2016, a Senate version of the law (S. 2193) was filibustered with the motion to invoke cloture receiving 55–42 votes mostly by Senate Republicans, therefore insufficient to defeat the filibuster. The Senate also voted on another bill often confused with Kate's Law, the Stop Dangerous Sanctuary Cities Act (S. 3100). The bill failed to proceed to a final vote in the Senate.

On June 23, 2017, U.S. Representative Bob Goodlatte from Virginia reintroduced two bills, Kate's Law (H.R. 3004) and No Sanctuary for Criminals, an anti-sanctuary city policy (H.R. 3003), into the House which passed on June 29 and proceeded to the Senate.

=== Deportation ===
On March 1, 2024, García Zárate was deported from the United States for the seventh time.
