= 2012 San Francisco Board of Supervisors election =

- November 6, 2012

The 2012 San Francisco Board of Supervisors elections occurred on November 6, 2012. Six of the eleven seats of the San Francisco Board of Supervisors were contested in this election. One incumbent was termed out of office, four ran for reelection, and one ran for initial election after being appointed to the seat.

Municipal elections in California are officially non-partisan, though most candidates in San Francisco do receive funding and support from various political parties. The election was held using ranked-choice voting.

== Results ==
=== District 1 ===

This district consists of the Richmond. Incumbent supervisor Eric Mar ran for reelection.

District 1 supervisorial election, 2012
Candidate	Votes	%
Eric Mar (incumbent)	15,266	53.50
David E. Lee	11,019	38.62
Sherman D. D'Silva	2,152	7.54
Write-in	96	0.34
Valid votes	28,533	92.86%
Invalid or blank votes	2,194	7.14
Total votes	30,727	100.00
Turnout	{{{votes}}}	70.43%

=== District 3 ===

District 3 consists of the northeastern corner of San Francisco, including Chinatown, the Financial District, Fisherman's Wharf, Nob Hill, North Beach, and Telegraph Hill. Incumbent supervisor David Chiu ran for reelection.

District 3 supervisorial election, 2012
Candidate	Votes	%
David Chiu (incumbent)	17,700	75.42
F. Joseph Butler	2,685	11.44
Marc Bruno	1,984	8.45
Wilma Pang	1,033	4.4
Valid votes	23,470	88.91%
Invalid or blank votes	2,926	11.09
Total votes	26,396	100.00
Turnout	{{{votes}}}	66.17%

=== District 5 ===

District 5 consists of the Fillmore, Haight-Ashbury, Hayes Valley, Japantown, UCSF, and the Western Addition. Incumbent supervisor Christina Olague ran for her first election after being appointed by Mayor Ed Lee in the wake of Ross Mirkarimi's resignation to be Sheriff of San Francisco.

District 5 supervisorial election, 2012
Candidate	Votes	%
London Breed	9,794	27.87
Christina Olague (incumbent)	6,939	19.75
John Rizzo	5,667	16.13
Julian Davis	5,318	15.14
Thea Selby	4,733	13.47
Daniel Everett	1,308	3.72
Andrew "Ellard" Resignato	777	2.21
Hope Johnson	486	1.38
Write-in	115	0.33
Valid votes	35,137	87.29%
Invalid or blank votes	5,116	12.71
Total votes	40,253	100.00
Turnout	{{{votes}}}	72.42%
Ranked choice voting — Pass 5
London Breed	14,945	56.16
Christina Olague (incumbent)	11,668	43.84
Eligible votes	26,613	66.11%
Exhausted votes	13,640	33.89%
Total votes	40,253	100.00

==== Ranked-choice vote distribution ====
Candidate	Pass 1	Pass 2	Pass 3	Pass 4	Pass 5
London Breed	9,842	10,378	11,671	13,122	14,945
Christina Olague	6,955	7,296	8,000	9,621	11,668
John Rizzo	5,683	6,080	7,333	9,005	
Julian Davis	5,342	5,751	6,494		
Thea Selby	4,738	5,191			
Daniel Everett	1,315				
Andrew "Ellard" Resignato	782				
Hope Johnson	490				
Eligible ballots	35,147	34,696	33,498	31,748	26,613
Exhausted ballots	5,106	5,557	6,755	8,505	13,640
Total	40,253	40,253	40,253	40,253	40,253

=== District 7 ===

District 7 consists of City College, Forest Hill, Lake Merced, Mount Davidson, Parkmerced, San Francisco State University, St. Francis Wood, and Twin Peaks. Incumbent supervisor Sean Elsbernd was termed out of office.

District 7 supervisorial election, 2012
Candidate	Votes	%
Norman Yee	9,142	29.18
F.X. Crowley	7,723	24.65
Mike Garcia	5,489	17.52
Joel Engardio	4,163	13.29
Robert J. Squeri	1,538	4.91
Julian Lagos	1,086	3.47
Andrew Bley	824	2.63
Lynn Gavin	716	2.29
Glenn Rogers	595	1.90
Write-in	58	0.19
Valid votes	31,334	88.64%
Invalid or blank votes	4,017	11.36
Total votes	35,351	100.00
Turnout	{{{votes}}}	74.90%
Ranked choice voting — Pass 6
Norman Yee	12,505	50.27
F.X. Crowley	12,373	49.73
Eligible votes	24,878	70.37%
Exhausted votes	10,473	29.63%
Total votes	35,351	100.0

==== Ranked-choice vote distribution ====
Candidate	Pass 1	Pass 2	Pass 3	Pass 4	Pass 5	Pass 6
Norman Yee	9,182	9,251	9,375	10,197	11,184	12,505
F.X. Crowley	7,746	7,807	7,883	8,624	9,709	12,373
Mike Garcia	5,512	5,556	5,642	6,296	7,473	
Joel Engardio	4,168	4,208	4,292	4,843		
Robert J. Squeri	1,545	1,592	1,624			
Julian Lagos	1,091	1,172	1,329			
Andrew Bley	825	925	1,072			
Lynn Gavin	719	803				
Glenn Rogers	597					
Eligible ballots	31,385	31,314	31,217	29,960	28,366	24,878
Exhausted ballots	3,966	4,037	4,134	5,391	6,985	10,473
Total	35,351	35,351	35,351	35,351	35,351	35,351

=== District 9 ===

District 9 consists of Bernal Heights, the Inner Mission, and the Portola. Incumbent supervisor David Campos ran for reelection.

District 9 supervisorial election, 2012
Candidate	Votes	%
David Campos (incumbent)	24,044	95.08
Bud Ryerson (write-in)	181	0.72
Other write-in	1,063	4.20
Valid votes	25,288	83.07%
Invalid or blank votes	5,153	16.93
Total votes	30,441	100.00
Turnout	{{{votes}}}	68.44%

=== District 11 ===

District 11 consists of Crocker-Amazon, the Excelsior, Ingleside, Oceanview, and the Outer Mission. Incumbent supervisor John Avalos ran for reelection unopposed.

District 11 supervisorial election, 2012
Candidate	Votes	%
John Avalos (incumbent)	17,748	94.25
Write-in	1,083	5.75
Valid votes	18,831	79.14%
Invalid or blank votes	4,964	20.86
Total votes	23,795	100.00
Turnout	{{{votes}}}	62.59%
