= Resolve to Stop Violence Project =

Resolve to Stop Violence Project is a program from the San Francisco Sheriff's Department in partnership with the nonprofit Community Works West that aims to help incarcerated prisoners recognize their violent attitudes and change them. Since 1997, it serves San Francisco County Jail inmates who agree that they are dangerous and wish to change. The program targets offenders, victims, and the community. The program has seen success in lowering recidivism, positively correlated to time spent in the program. It is seen as a model for using therapy and restorative practices to reduce rearrests.

== See also ==
- Rehabilitation (penology)
- Incarceration in the United States
- Violent crime in the United States
- Crime in San Francisco
