= Renee Hsia =

American emergency physician

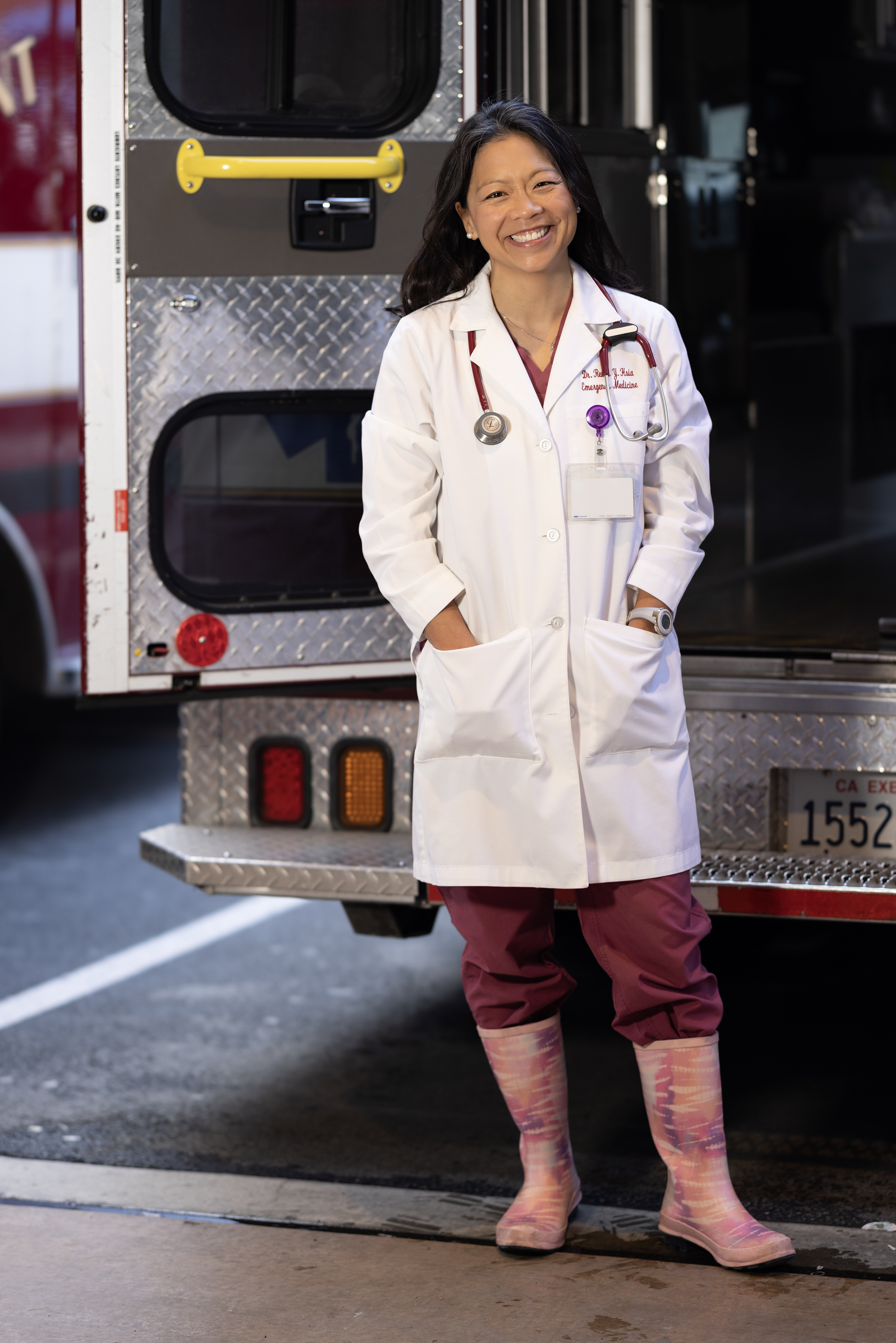
- Renee Hsia in 2022
- Born: Huntsville, Alabama, USA
- Occupation: Emergency physician

Academic background
- Education: BA, Princeton School of Public and International Affairs; MSc, London School of Economics / London School of Hygiene & Tropical Medicine; MD, Harvard Medical School

Academic work
- Institutions: University of California, San Francisco; Zuckerberg San Francisco General Hospital and Trauma Center

Renee Yuen-Jan Hsia is an American emergency physician. She is a professor of Emergency Medicine and Associate Chair of Health Services Research at the University of California, San Francisco, as well as an attending physician in the emergency department at the Zuckerberg San Francisco General Hospital and Trauma Center. She is also a core faculty member of the UCSF Philip R. Lee Institute for Health Policy Studies. Her research is aimed at studying how health services and regionalization of care impact access to emergency care.

== Education ==
Hsia was born in Huntsville, Alabama and grew up in Arlington, Texas. She graduated from Lamar High School as valedictorian. Hsia attended Princeton University and during her junior year received the George B. Wood Legacy Junior Prize for academic achievement. In her final year, she was named the co-recipient of the M. Taylor Pyne Prize, the highest honor conferred on a Princeton undergraduate. Upon completing her Bachelor of Arts degree in Public and International Affairs, Hsia received a Master's degree in Health Policy, Planning, and Financing from the London School of Economics/London School of Hygiene and Tropical Medicine before returning to the United States for her medical degree at Harvard Medical School.

== Career ==
Upon completing her residency at Stanford University, Hsia joined the faculty at the University of California, San Francisco (UCSF) in 2007. During her tenure at UCSF, she became the founder and director of The Policy Lab of Acute Care and Emergencies (The PLACE) and served as Associate Chair of Health Services Research in the Department of Emergency Medicine. As a result of her research, Hsia was elected a member of the American Society for Clinical Investigation. In 2021, Hsia was elected a member of the National Academy of Medicine "for expertise in health disparities of emergency care, integrating the disciplines of economics, health policy, and clinical investigation." Hsia has worked extensively abroad, including in Rwanda, Senegal, Uganda, South Sudan, Eritrea, China, Haiti, Honduras, and Mexico with various organizations. From 2019 to 2020, she spent one year as a Fulbright-Schuman Scholar in Spain, studying disparities in access to the Spanish healthcare system for undocumented migrants.

== Research ==
Hsia's research has focused on how organization of health services and regionalization of care impact access to the emergency care system. She studies disparities in access to emergency departments and trauma centers, the distribution of emergency care across low-income areas and minority communities, and how emergency services closures differentially impact patient outcomes for health disparity populations. Her research also focuses on healthcare costs and financing issues within the emergency care system and how this relates to inequities in the provision of critical services to patients. Specifically, her research has focused on patients with acute myocardial infarction, stroke, asthma/COPD, sepsis, and trauma. She has published on these issues in a broad range of journals, including the New England Journal of Medicine, the Journal of the American Medical Association, and Health Affairs. Hsia has written over 150 peer-reviewed manuscripts. She has received a Career Development Award from the UCSF Clinical and Translational Science Institute, as well as several private foundation grants, including the Robert Wood Johnson Foundation, the National Institutes of Health (National Heart, Lung, and Blood Institute), and the Agency for Healthcare Research and Quality. She has also served as Principal Investigator for several R01 research awards from the National Heart, Lung, and Blood Institute examining the impacts of cardiac care regionalization and percutaneous coronary intervention lab openings and closures.
