= Christina Olague =

American advocate (born 1961)

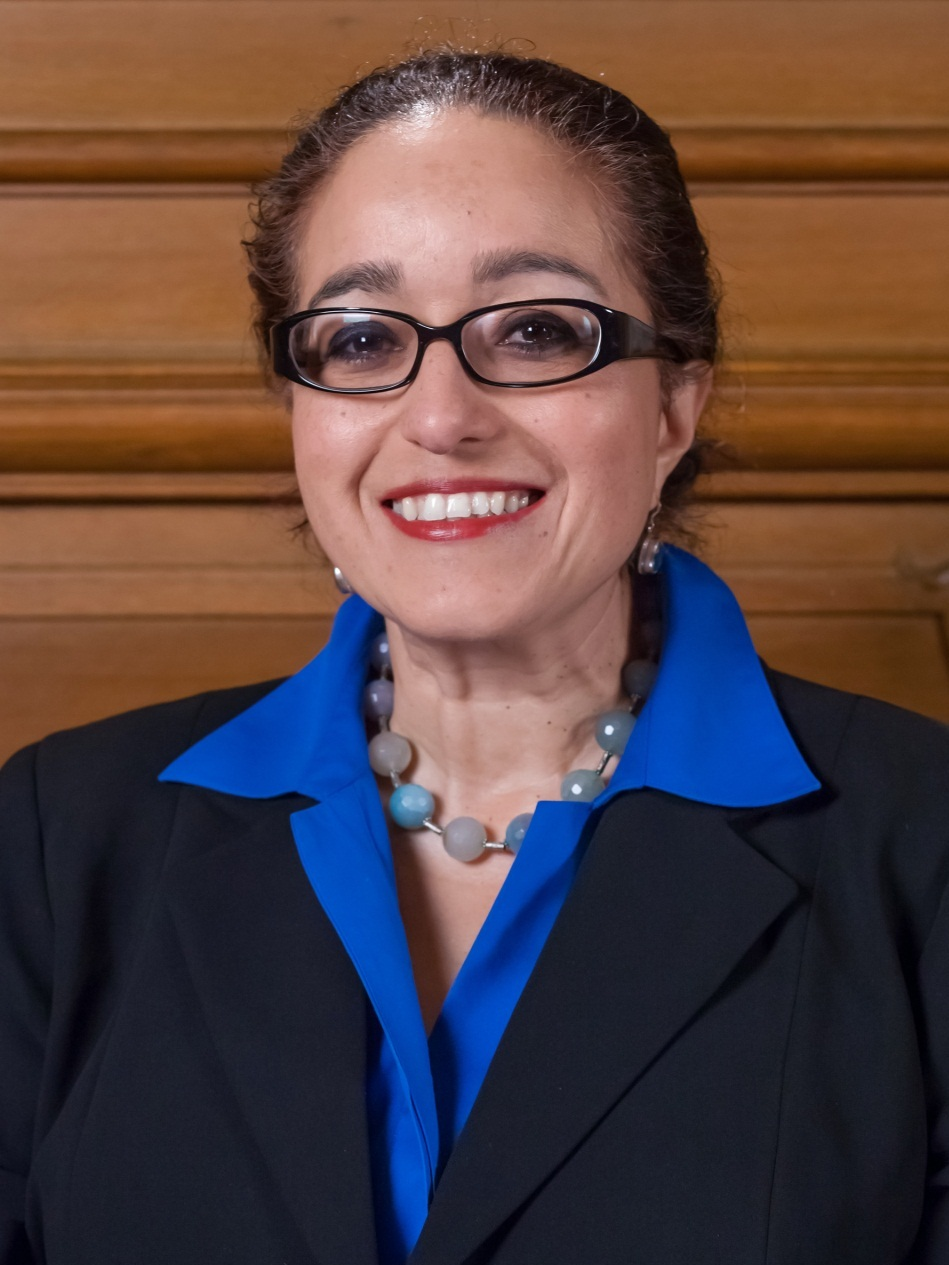
- Official portrait, 2012

Member of the San Francisco Board of Supervisors from the 5th district
- In office January 9, 2012 – January 8, 2013
- Mayor: Ed Lee
- Preceded by: Ross Mirkarimi
- Succeeded by: London Breed

Personal details
- Born: June 11, 1961 (age 65) Merced, California, U.S.
- Party: Democratic
- Education: California Institute of Integral Studies
- Occupation: Politician
- Profession: Community organizer
- Website: liga8et

Christina Olague /oʊˌlɑːˈɡi/ (born June 11, 1961) is an American senior and housing rights advocate and an American politician. She served on the San Francisco Board of Supervisors in 2012, representing District 5, which consists of Haight-Ashbury, part of Hayes Valley, the Inner Sunset, Japantown, and the Western Addition.

Olague was appointed to the post by mayor Ed Lee in the wake of her predecessor Ross Mirkarimi's election to be sheriff of San Francisco. However, she was defeated by challenger London Breed in the San Francisco Board of Supervisors elections, 2012. She was the first openly bisexual person to serve as a San Francisco Supervisor.

== Personal life ==
Olague grew up in a farm labor camp in California's Central Valley. The injustices she witnessed there drove her to participate in politics as a teenager, when she became involved in matters concerning immigrants, anti-war efforts, and opposition to nuclear energy.

Olague is openly bisexual. In 2014, the house in San Francisco where Olague lived caught fire and burned down, killing one of her roommates.

== Political career ==
Olague was active in the Mission Anti-Displacement Coalition in the late 1990s fighting for low income residents of the Mission. She then worked with Senior Action Network. She worked to defeat Proposition 98 the statewide measure that would have banned rent control.

Prior to her appointment to the Board of Supervisors, she served as the president of the San Francisco Planning Commission. As planning commissioner, she worked to pass laws that would stop owner move in evictions of seniors, the disabled or the terminally ill. She lost her seat as a supervisor of a progressive district to London Breed. Her loss was due primarily to her controversial vote to allow Sheriff Ross Mirkarimi to remain in office despite his pleading guilty to a domestic violence charge.

She also served on the board of LYRIC, the Lavender Youth Recreation and Information Center for LGBT youth in the Castro, and was a member of the Harvey Milk LGBT Democratic Club, and the Transit Riders Union. Olague switched from the Green Party to the Democratic Party with the election of Barack Obama.
