= Ross Mirkarimi =

American politician and sheriff

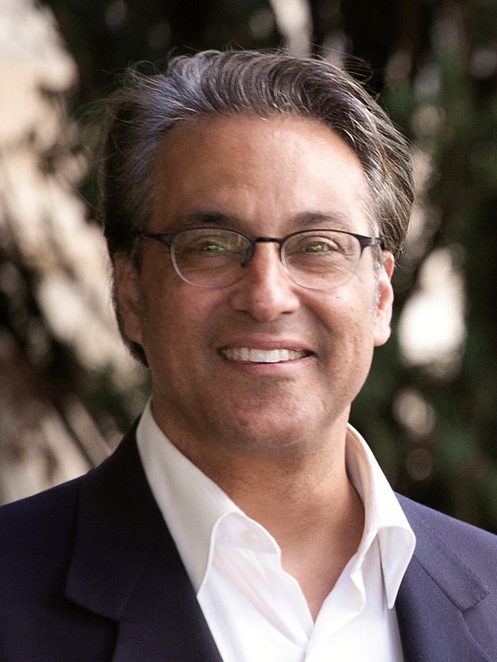
- Official portrait, 2014

Sheriff of San Francisco
- In office October 10, 2012 – January 7, 2016
- Mayor: Ed Lee
- Preceded by: Vicki Hennessy (Interim)
- Succeeded by: Vicki Hennessy
- In office January 7, 2012 – March 20, 2012
- Mayor: Ed Lee
- Preceded by: Michael Hennessey
- Succeeded by: Vicki Hennessy (Interim)

Member of the San Francisco Board of Supervisors from the 5th district
- In office January 8, 2005 – January 7, 2012
- Mayor: Gavin Newsom; Ed Lee
- Preceded by: Matt Gonzalez
- Succeeded by: Christina Olague

Personal details
- Born: 1961 (age 64–65) Chicago, Illinois
- Party: Democratic (since 2010)
- Other political affiliations: Green (founding non-member)
- Spouse: Eliana Lopez
- Children: Theo Mirkarimi
- Education: St. Louis University; Golden Gate University; University of San Francisco
- Occupation: Politician

Rostam Mirkarimi (born 1961) is an American politician and the former sheriff of San Francisco. Prior to being sheriff, he served on the San Francisco Board of Supervisors, where he represented District 5.

Mirkarimi is a co-founder of the Green Party of California. Elected as a supervisor, Mirkarimi received national attention in 2007 when he introduced the first legislation prohibiting the use of non-biodegradable plastic bags by large supermarkets and drugstores, making San Francisco the first city to do so.

In March 2010, Mirkarimi became a Democrat and he was elected sheriff in November 2011. He served from January to March 2012, at which time he was charged with domestic violence battery, child endangerment, and dissuading a witness in connection with a December 31, 2011 New Year's Eve altercation with his wife, and he was suspended from office pending an ethics investigation. Mirkarimi pleaded guilty to one count of misdemeanor false imprisonment, but was not removed from office. He lost his reelection bid to Vicki Hennessy in 2015. Mirkarimi became the first sheriff in San Francisco to lose their bid for reelection.

== Early life and education ==
Mirkarimi was born in Chicago to Nancy Kolman, who is of Russian Jewish descent, and Hamid Mirkarimi, an Iranian immigrant. His parents divorced when he was 5, and he moved with his mother to Jamestown, Rhode Island, in 1973. He graduated from the Catholic, all-male Bishop Hendricken High School.

He has a bachelor's degree in political science from St. Louis University, a master's degree in international economics and affairs from Golden Gate University, and a master of science degree in environmental science from the University of San Francisco. He has lived in San Francisco since 1984.

Mirkarimi is a graduate of the San Francisco Police Academy, where he was the president of his class. Before his election to office, he served in the San Francisco District Attorney's Office investigating white collar crime.

== Founding of California Green Party ==
"I totally credit my childhood in Jamestown for my green views," Mirkarimi said. "I'll never forget living near Fort Getty and exploring the unspoiled island with my dog Oscar when I was a boy."

Mirkarimi was a co-founder of the San Francisco Greens, and participated in founding the California's Green Party in 1990. He coordinated Ralph Nader's 2000 presidential campaign in California. He also managed local campaigns in San Francisco, including the 1989 Nuclear Free Zone initiative, the 1999 re-election campaign of DA Terence Hallinan, the 2001 campaign for public power and the March 2002 campaign to elect Harry Britt to the State Assembly. He was a press spokesperson and campaign aide in Matt Gonzalez's 2003 San Francisco mayoral campaign. Mirkarimi supported Democrat Barack Obama in the 2008 presidential election. While serving on the Board of Supervisors he changed his voter registration party affiliation to Democrat, acknowledging that he would be unable to advance in his political career as a registered Green.

He supported Green Party candidate Krissy Keefer over Nancy Pelosi in the 2006 congressional election. "Why," he asked in regard to supporting Pelosi, "do we decide to support the lesser of two evils or the evil of two lessers ... the level of mediocrity being dished out by the Republicans and Democrats?"

== San Francisco Board of Supervisors (2005–2012) ==
As a San Francisco County supervisor, Mirkarimi sponsored some 40 pieces of legislation in a wide range of areas, including medical marijuana, crime, making streets safer for pedestrians, improving efficiency of city departments, and the environment.

== Opposition to school closures ==
Mirkarimi, along with District 10 Supervisor Sophie Maxwell opposed a proposal to close two dozen public schools, predominantly in their districts. This proposal was ultimately scaled back dramatically.

=== Marijuana legalization ===
In April 2009, he proposed legislation that would make San Francisco the first city in the nation to sell and distribute marijuana. "We're spending much more money keeping marijuana underground, trying to hide a fact that is occurring all around us," he said. "Now is the time to take responsibility for something we've deflected to others and to test our ability to take responsibility."

On April 20, 2006 (4-20), the National Organization for the Reform of Marijuana Laws honored Mirkarimi with its Rufus King Award for outstanding leadership in the reform of marijuana laws. In a speech accepting the award, he said,

That particular logic (of being in favor of medicinal marijuana but not wanting dispensaries in the neighborhood in which you live), as complex as it is, was emblematic of what certainly concerned me, that we continue to drive back in the shadows the very idea of what we're all congregated here for, and that is to mainstream the issue so that marijuana should not be criminalized and medical cannabis should not be criminalized, and that we should do everything we can to build that kind of resiliency, to shore up even in the face of adversity, that while there's any attempt at pushback or blowback from our efforts to try to proliferate Prop 215 states throughout all fifty states of the United States, that we should not shrink at all with that ever particular kind of adversity once again.

=== Tobacco smoking ban on golf courses ===
Mirkarimi supported a measure by Supervisor Michela Alioto-Pier to ban smoking in city parks. He helped expand the ban to bus shelters and the city's public golf courses. Not extending the law to golf courses, Mirkarimi declared, "has this undertone of elitism."

=== Reentry Council ===
On September 9, 2008, the San Francisco Board of Supervisors passed Mirkarimi's legislation creating a Reentry Council to coordinate the disparate and disconnected city programs that help ex-offenders transition from incarceration back into society. Mirkarimi, in collaboration with Public Defender Jeff Adachi, District Attorney Kamala Harris and Sheriff Michael Hennessey, crafted the legislation to increase the effectiveness of City-wide efforts to reduce recidivism and violence, and promote safe and successful reentry into society for adults released from jails and prisons.

=== Environmental issues ===
In March 2007, Mirkarimi introduced legislation that prohibits large supermarkets and drugstores from providing customers with non-biodegradable plastic bags, making San Francisco the first city to regulate such bags. Since then other cities around the country and in Europe have taken up similar bans, and there is a move by the California legislature to do the same. Mirkarimi said, "Instead of waiting for the federal government to do something about this country's oil dependence, environmental degradation or contribution to global warming, local governments can step up and do their part. The plastic bag ban is one small part of that." Many supermarkets opposed such legislation. The bill passed 10-1 and became an ordinance. Although the ban was initially criticized as "cosmetic" by the SF Weekly, which asserted that the ban has led to an increase in the use of paper bags, a practice they claim is worse for the environment, the ban also requires stores to charge a ten-cent fee for each paper bag used, to encourage consumers to use reusable shopping bags. All revenues from the fee are kept by the stores. In 2012, the San Francisco Board of Supervisors unanimously passed an expansion of the ban to include to all retailers citywide.

In June 2008, Mirkarimi sponsored a one-year pilot program of a solar rebate program that provides $1.5 million to nonprofit organizations and lower-income residents for the installation of photovoltaic solar power on rooftops; the measure received initial approval from the Board of Supervisors. In July, he was one of several supervisors who, along with the mayor and various organizations, opposed a move to build fossil-fuel power plants in the low-income southeastern part of San Francisco.

Mirkarimi was the chief sponsor of a measure to require most employers to give pre-tax commuter checks to employees, with the intention of getting workers out of commuting via private car and into using public transportation; the measure is unlike many others involving regulation of businesses in that it was not opposed by the Chamber of Commerce.

=== Reparations bill ===
In 2008, Mirkarimi authored part of a reparations bill which would give descendants of those displaced by the San Francisco Redevelopment Agency from the Western Addition priority in obtaining affordable housing. During the 1960s the city tore down much of the historic Fillmore district, most of whose residents were permanently removed. Two-thirds of those displaced were African-American.

== San Francisco Sheriff's Department (2012–2016) ==
=== 2011 campaign for sheriff ===
In May 2011, scheduled to be termed out as supervisor, Mirkarimi announced he was running for sheriff of San Francisco in the November 2011 election.

Mirkarimi did not receive the endorsement of the San Francisco Deputy Sheriff's Association, the union representing sheriffs. In an endorsement election of members, Capt. Paul Miyamoto received 353 votes to Mirkarimi's 2 votes. "This was a very large turnout for us," said Don Wilson, president of the association. "Miyamoto is a very popular guy in our department. We want one of our own to be sheriff. We want someone with experience."

In an interview with the Public Affairs Alliance of Iranian Americans (PAAIA), Mirkarimi said about his candidacy:

The challenges of our campaign are that I am running citywide. I have opposition, but with my name recognition as an elected official, it's one of the first times that I'm seen as an automatic frontrunner, instead of the underdog posture that I'm more used to from my previous runs. The election is in November 2011, and it will be at the same time as the mayor and district attorney. Competing for resources and attention is always an inherent challenge with other high profile races.

Mirkarimi made combatting recidivism a centerpiece of his campaign:

We have to realize that what happens in the jail system directly affects public safety throughout all of San Francisco neighborhoods. That entwinement can't really be denied anymore, and the money we throw at the Police Department to just re-arrest the same people really sort of is counter-intuitive without asking the obvious question, "What can we do so that when somebody comes out they will not repeat their offense?" And there are tested programs already existing in the Sheriff's Department, ones that we could I think consider adopting and ones that deserve institutional support because most of the programs in the Sheriff's Department aren't general-fund-funded, they're grant-funded, and so they live and die by the vulnerability of those grants. That says San Francisco is not frontburnering the importance of what it means to stand towards the development and accountability of those programs, and that needs to change. I'll change it.

=== False imprisonment conviction ===
==== Charges ====
On January 13, 2012, Mirkarimi was charged with domestic violence battery, child endangerment, and dissuading a witness. The charges came five days after he was sworn in publicly as sheriff and resulted from an altercation Mirkarimi had with his wife, Eliana Lopez, before he became sheriff, on New Year's Eve. The domestic abuse complaint was lodged by Ivory Madison, a neighbor of Mirkarimi who had helped raise funds for his campaign for sheriff. According to a search warrant that police issued on Madison to obtain text messages that she exchanged with Lopez and a video that she took of Lopez's bruised arm, Madison called police after Lopez told her that she had been bruised in a New Year's Eve altercation with Mirkarimi. Madison videotaped the bruise at the request of Lopez, and the two discussed the incident via text messages. Madison also "indicated the alleged incident indicated a larger pattern of abuse." On the video, Lopez said, "This is the second time this is happening ... We need help and I'm going to use this just in case he wants to take Theo away from me because he did said [sic] that he is very powerful and can do it."

During the Ethics Commission hearings, significant portions of Madison's sworn statement were ruled inadmissible and Lopez testified that she realized she could not trust Madison after Madison suggested "calling Ross's political enemies" to help her bring him down. Lopez said that after she had clearly said that she didn't want police involvement, Madison called the police.

After his swearing-in ceremony, Mirkarimi suggested that the police probe was politically motivated, and called the incident "a private matter. A family matter." Mirkarimi's wife, Eliana Lopez, repudiated the charges against her husband.

On January 23, 2012, a second woman filed a police report claiming that Mirkarimi had abused her.

==== Plea ====
On January 20, Mirkarimi pleaded not guilty to the domestic violence, child endangerment, and dissuading a witness charges. The judge issued a stay-away order requiring Mirkarimi not to have any contact with his wife or two-year-old son. The judge said that based on an arrest warrant affidavit that contains "physical and emotional abuse," a stay-away order was necessary.

On March 13, Mirkarimi pleaded guilty to a misdemeanor charge of false imprisonment. The charges of domestic violence and two other misdemeanor counts were dropped. Under the plea agreement, Mirkarimi was sentenced to three years' probation, one year of weekly domestic violence batterers classes, parenting classes, a hundred hours of community service, and fines and court fees nearing $600.

Later, Mirkarimi said he agreed to the plea bargain because it did not require him to relinquish his firearm, which he needed to carry out his job as sheriff. He blamed a "runaway train of innuendo" in the news media for his legal travails.

On July 20, 2012, Judge Garrett Wong lifted the stay away order originally issued in January 2012 that barred Mirkarimi from contacting his wife.

=== Calls for resignation, suspension, and support ===
On March 20, San Francisco Mayor Ed Lee gave Mirkarimi a 24-hour ultimatum to resign from his post as sheriff. When Mirkarimi refused to resign, the Mayor appointed a temporary replacement, Vicki Hennessy, and ordered the city's Ethics Commission and Board of Supervisors to investigate Mirkarimi under misconduct charges. Mirkarimi was suspended without pay.

In late July 2012 the National Lawyers Guild of San Francisco issued a statement urging the Board of Supervisors to support Mirkarimi and calling for an end to the use of City resources to pursue the case. On October 8, former girlfriend Evelyn Nieves, spoke out in support of Mirkarimi, saying that he never made her feel unsafe in their 8 years together.

Several groups also created statements of support for Mirkarimi to remain in office since the domestic violence allegations surfaced, including the San Francisco Labor Council. the Bernal Heights Democratic Club, the Central City Democrats, the SF League of Pissed-off Voters and the San Francisco Green Party. Numerous Mirkarimi supporters spoke in his favor during Ethics Commission hearings. San Francisco Chronicle columnist Debra Saunders wrote in defense of Mirkarimi's case.

=== Ethics Commission and Board of Supervisor Hearings ===
On April 23, 2012, misconduct hearings commenced at the San Francisco Ethics Commission to decide whether to recommend removing Mirkarimi from the sheriff's office. Mirkarimi's lawyers attempted to prevent the video of Mirkarimi's wife crying and pointing to the bruise on her arm from being played at the hearings, but on May 14 a judge ruled that the video could be played. The Commission ruled significant portions of Ivory Madison's sworn statement inadmissible.

On August 16, the Commission ruled by 4 to 1 that Mirkarimi committed official misconduct by falsely imprisoning his wife, but delayed until September the decision to recommend whether he should be removed from office. Of the six charges brought by District Attorney George Gascón, five were overruled and not sustained, including the charge that Mirkarimi dissuaded witnesses and that he abused the power of his office. The San Francisco Commission on the Status of Women recommended by a vote of 5 to 2 that the Board of Supervisors remove Mirkarimi as sheriff.

According to one poll, nearly two-thirds of San Franciscans wanted Mirkarimi out of office for his behavior and uphold his removal. David Waggoner, Mirkarimi's attorney, criticized the poll as "twisted" and "biased," asking "leading questions," and objected to the fact that the poll was funded by individuals who opposed the sheriff. A San Francisco resident contacted by the robo-poll and later interviewed by the SF Bay Guardian about its content, Greg Kamin, described it as unusual because "there was just a barrage of negative information first, before they asked a single question," and said that the questions were structured so that, "there was no way to answer the question that didn't say you wanted him removed." The questions asked in the poll were not published.

To remove a public official for misconduct, the San Francisco City Charter requires that at least nine of the eleven supervisors vote for removal. On October 9, 2012, only seven supervisors voted to remove Mirkarimi as Sheriff, and he was duly reinstated. Those who voted to reinstate Mikarimi were Supervisors David Campos, John Avalos, Jane Kim, and Christina Olague. Olague subsequently lost her seat as a supervisor of a progressive district to London Breed, due primarily to her vote to allow Mirkarimi to remain in office despite his pleading guilty to a domestic violence charge. Campos lost a race in 2014 against fellow supervisor David Chiu for a seat in the State Assembly due in part to the Mirkarimi vote.

=== Attempt to expunge false imprisonment conviction ===
On April 20, 2015, Mirkarimi filed a motion for dismissal and expungement with San Francisco Superior Court to remove his misdemeanor false imprisonment conviction from his criminal record.

=== Death of missing woman in hospital stairwell ===
In November 2013, Sheriff Mirkarimi publicly apologized for his department's slow and incomplete search for Lynne Spalding, a San Francisco General Hospital patient whose body was found in a stairwell by a hospital engineer two weeks after she went missing from her hospital bed. The Sheriff's Department is responsible for securing the hospital and its patients. Mirkarimi said his department waited nine days after Lynne Spalding was reported missing to begin a hospital-wide search for the 57-year-old patient, and the search did not locate her. "She could have been anyone's loved one, which is why the gravity of the situation is not lost on any of us," the Sheriff said. "What happened to Miss Spalding Ford should not have happened to anyone." Mirkarimi did not say why deputies didn't check the stairwell where Spalding was found.

=== 2015 campaign for re-election ===
In June 2014, Mirkarimi filed papers to run for re-election in 2015. He didn't send out press releases to alert the press he was running. He ran against Vicki Hennessy, who served as interim sheriff when Mirkarimi was suspended from his post as Sheriff in 2012. In March 2015, Mirkarimi failed to receive the endorsement of the hundred-member San Francisco Sheriff's Managers and Supervisors Association, only seven of whom voted to endorse him. In an article titled "S.F. Sheriff Mirkarimi reeling from scandal over forced fights," the San Francisco Chronicle suggested that Mirkarimi would have difficulty being re-elected in light of recent scandals in the Sheriff's Department — an escaped prisoner and a report that deputies in San Francisco County Jail had forced prisoners to fight each other for the guards' amusement. Mirkarimi lost his bid for re-election to Hennessey on November 3, 2015, receiving 38% of the vote, while Hennessey received 62%.

During the campaign, Mirkarimi started wearing the brown official uniform of a San Francisco sheriff's deputy, about which Willie Brown wrote in his San Francisco Chronicle column, "And by the way, Ross, that uniform you’ve been wearing was last used by an actor portraying Haile Selassie in a grade-B movie."

== Law enforcement issues ==
=== Support of the San Francisco 8 ===
In 2008, Mirkarimi supported a controversial resolution by the San Francisco Board of Supervisors asking the state to drop charges against the San Francisco 8, eight professed members of the Black Liberation Army arrested for their involvement in the 1971 murder of Sgt. John V. Young at San Francisco's Ingleside Police station. The charges had been dismissed by the judge who discovered that their confessions had been extracted under torture. The San Francisco Chronicle opined, "A police officer slain in the line of duty is a disgrace that needs an answer. Instead, the shotgun slaying of Sgt. John Young is getting the political treatment from four San Francisco supervisors more interested in rhetoric than healing justice."

=== Police foot patrols ===
Mirkarimi sponsored legislation to require police foot patrols in high-crime neighborhoods. The Board of Supervisors approved this measure, but Mayor Gavin Newsom, citing objections by Police Chief Heather Fong, vetoed it. However, by a 9-2 vote, the Board overrode the veto; this was the first time that the Board of Supervisors had overridden a Newsom veto. As of 2010, the policy was not implemented. New San Francisco Police Chief George Gascón called foot patrols "laughable" and "simplistic." In 2010, San Francisco voters rejected Measure M, sponsored by Mirkarimi, which would have required the San Francisco Police Department to maintain a foot patrol presence from all its stations. Voters rejected the measure 54 to 46 percent.

=== Shooting range controversy ===
In 2015, Mirkarimi failed a firearms test at the mandated target ranges. Mirkarimi was banned from carrying a firearm, and by definition could no longer be Sheriff since he was not qualified at the range. He was also accused of re-assigning the range master, who questioned whether the sheriff was allowed to carry a gun while on probation.

=== Shooting of Kathryn Steinle ===
Mirkarimi figured in the sanctuary city lawsuit of the family of Kathryn Steinle against the Immigration and Customs Enforcement (ICE), the City of San Francisco and the Bureau of Land Management. On January 7, 2017, Magistrate Judge Joseph C. Spero dismissed the family's claims of negligence and complicity against ICE and San Francisco.

== Civic and community organizations ==
Mirkarimi has been involved in these civic and community service activities: Director for SF Nuclear Freeze Zone Coalition; San Francisco Greens/Green Party; union negotiator for DAI Association union; member of the IFPTE Local 2; member of the Harvey Milk Lesbian/Gay/Bisexual/Transgender Democratic Club; member of the Iranian-American Chamber of Commerce; environmental analyst for the Harvard Study Team (Iraq) Bayview Hunters Point, California Base Closures; and member of the National Organization for Women (NOW).

== Post-political career ==
After his political career, Mirkarimi focused his efforts on legalizing marijuana. As a representative of RMir Pro Civicus Consulting, his consulting firm, Mirkarimi advised the Uruguayan government how to legalize medical marijuana. On April 20, 2016, he spoke at "Burn One for Bernie," a marijuana-friendly fundraising event for presidential candidate Bernie Sanders. According to Dope magazine, Mirkarimi is an advisor to BASA, a marijuana dispensary in San Francisco.

== Personal life ==
Mikarimi and his wife, Eliana Lopez, have two sons, born in 2009 and 2017.

=== Driver license revoked ===
The San Francisco Chronicle reported on August 10, 2015, that Mirkarimi's driver license had been suspended since February as a result of his failure to report a traffic accident that occurred October 2, 2014. Under state law, drivers are required to file a damage report if a collision results in an injury or in damage exceeding $750. The other driver filed a report, but Mirkarimi did not, nor did he pay the $55 fee to regain his full driving privileges.

== See also ==
Political offices
Preceded by Matt Gonzalez	Member of the San Francisco Board of Supervisors; District 5; 2005-2012	Succeeded by Christina Olague
Preceded by Michael Hennessey	Sheriff of the City and County of San Francisco; January 7, 2012 – March 20, 2012	Succeeded by Vicki Hennessy (Interim)
Preceded by Vicki Hennessy (Interim)	Sheriff of the City and County of San Francisco; October 10, 2012 – January 7, 2016	Succeeded by Vicki Hennessy
