= Daniel Gallagher =

Daniel Gallagher may refer to:

- Daniel Gallagher (sheriff) (1896–1956), sheriff of the City and County of San Francisco
- Daniel J. Gallagher (1873–1953), American attorney and political figure in Massachusetts
- Daniel M. Gallagher (born 1972), Commissioner of the U.S. Securities and Exchange Commission
- Dan Gallagher (1957–2001), Canadian television presenter
- Dan Gallagher (footballer) (born 1997), English footballer, playing for Dorking Wanderers
