= Michael Hennessey =

Sheriff of San Francisco

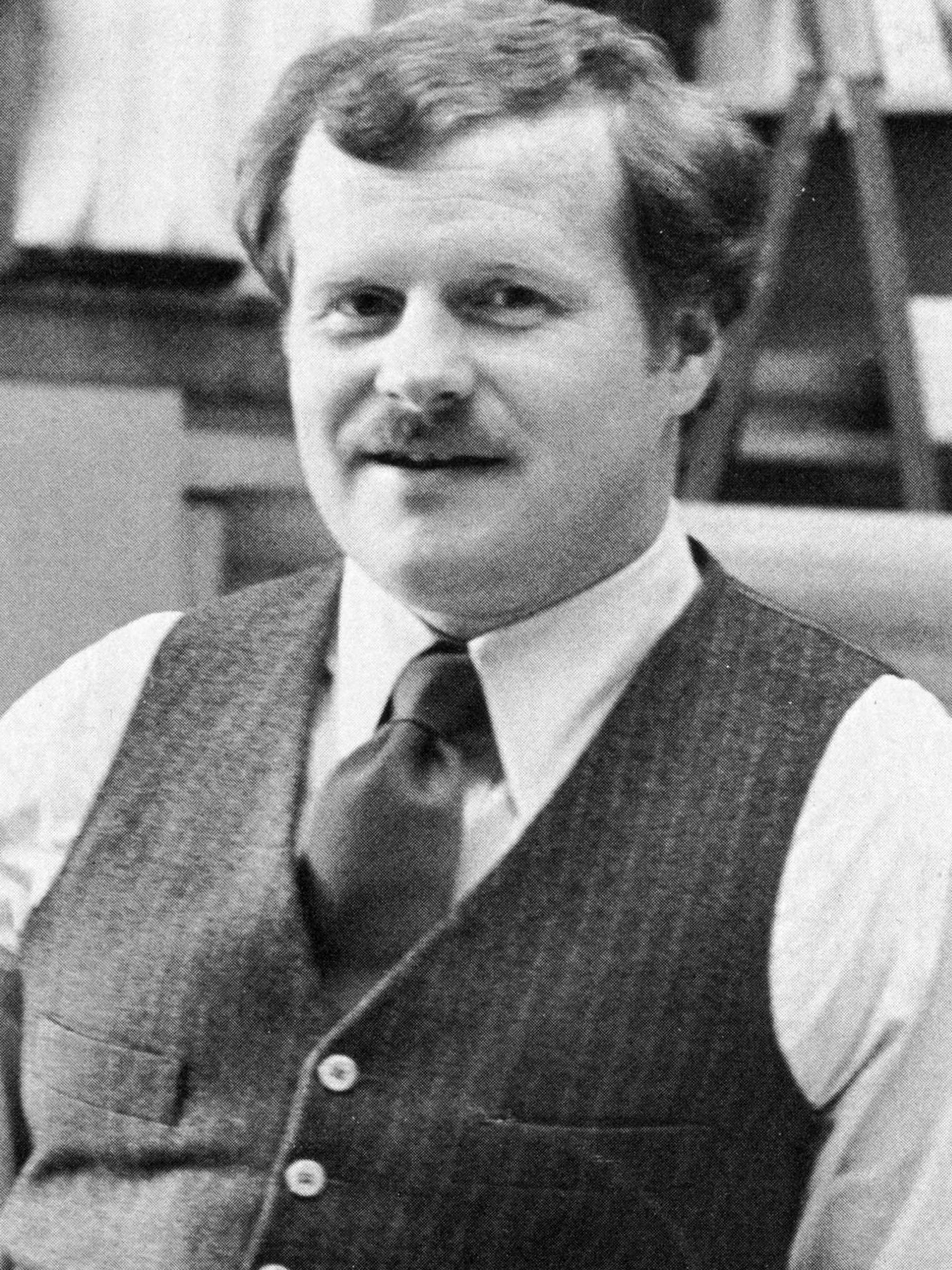
- Hennessey in 1983

Sheriff of San Francisco
- In office 1980–2012
- Preceded by: Eugene A. Brown
- Succeeded by: Ross Mirkarimi

Personal details
- Born: c. 1948 (age 77–78)
- Education: Saint John's University; University of San Francisco School of Law

Michael Hennessey (born c. 1948) is an American attorney and former Sheriff of San Francisco. Hennessey was elected in a run-off election in December 1979 and served until 2012, becoming the longest serving Sheriff in the history of San Francisco and was the longest tenured Sheriff in the State of California.

By the end of his final term (January 2012), he had served as San Francisco's Sheriff for 32 years and had received more than one million votes as Sheriff. No other San Francisco Sheriff has served for more than sixteen years.

On February 18, 2011, he announced he would not run for a ninth term of office.

His tenure was notable for the development of prisoner education and rehabilitation programs, by construction of three major jail facilities and by expansion of powers of the Office of Sheriff.

== Early life ==
Hennessey grew up in Manilla, Iowa, a town of 900 people in western Iowa. Hennessey graduated with a degree in history from St. John's University (Collegeville, Minnesota) in 1970 and then moved to San Francisco to attend law school. He graduated with Honors from the University of San Francisco School of Law in 1973, where he helped found the school rugby team and served as an editor of the Law Review.

Following graduation from law school, Hennessey took a temporary job in the San Francisco Sheriff's Department as Legal Counsel to Sheriff Richard Hongisto (December 1973 – June 1974) and then joined the newly created University Year for Action (UYA) program providing a variety of social services to prisoners in the San Francisco county jail. UYA was a Volunteers In Service to America program (VISTA), a domestic version of the Peace Corp. In this capacity, he created a legal services program for county jail inmates. After a year as a UYA participant, Hennessey attracted the support of the San Francisco Bar Association, who served as his sponsor for the next several years.

== Election as sheriff ==
Sheriff Hongisto was reelected for a second term in November 1975, but left the office midway through the term (December 1977) after Cleveland, Ohio Mayor Dennis Kucinich offered him the position of Chief of Police. In early February 1978, Mayor George Moscone appointed Eugene Brown to replace Hongisto.

With a non-elected Sheriff facing the voters in November 1979, Hennessey and five other challengers ran against Sheriff Brown. Hennessey garnered the most votes in the November election, but not the 50% required to win the post. In a December runoff election, he beat the incumbent and took office in January 1980.

Until 1986 there were no "qualifications" to run for the elected office of county sheriff. The fact that there were no limits on who could run for sheriff resulted in some challenges to sheriffs in the state, frequently from other elected officials and even the wives of prisoners. The California State Sheriff's Association lobbied heavily to create "qualifications" for eligibility standards to seek the office and in 1986 Governor George Deukmejian signed a bill into law limiting candidates to current and former peace officers. The law also grandfathered in "those already in office at the time this law goes into effect." Hennessey was the only person to whom this last provision applied.

== Sheriff of San Francisco ==
Six weeks after taking office, four federal bank robbers escaped from the city's oldest jail, although all were recaptured within 24 hours. A few weeks later the San Francisco jail suffered the largest jail break in City history. A gun was smuggled into the jail's high security unit and thirteen dangerous prisoners escaped from the downtown Hall of Justice. A year later, one of the department's own deputies helped a leader of the Hells Angels escape by hiding him in a laundry cart and pushing him out to freedom via the jail's freight elevator.

More controversy followed Hennessey when he hired an ex-offender to run the jail's rehabilitation programs. The ex-con, Michael Marcum, had been a UYA social worker when Hennessey was part of the UYA program. Marcum had served seven years in California prisons for the murder of his father in the 1960s. Hennessey and Marcum became lifelong friends and their friendship resulted in many controversies, including a vote of no confidence by the Deputy Sheriff's Association and a demonstration by deputies when, in 1993, Hennessey promoted Marcum to the position of Assistant Sheriff, the third highest position in the department.

Hennessey was regularly returned to office every election. He rarely faced serious opposition, twice running unopposed. His popularity is largely attributed to his progressive leadership in introducing innovative rehabilitation programs in the jails, aggressive hiring within San Francisco's minority communities, and improving the professionalism of the department.

However, Hennessey's attempts to bring more accountability to law enforcement were often stymied by local prosecutors. "In my 32 years as sheriff, I presented dozens of cases involving deputies accused of everything from sexual assault to smuggling contraband to falsifying time sheets to three different district attorneys — and not one case was ever charged," he told San Francisco columnists Matier and Ross.

Hennessey is considered a visionary in bringing rehabilitation and education programs into the jails. Most of the programs that Hennessey initiated were ahead of their time, but are now not uncommon in jails and prisons: substance abuse counseling, alternatives to incarceration, education and anti-violence counseling. This last effort resulted in a program called Resolve to Stop the Violence Program (RSVP) which received the national Innovations in Government Award from the Kennedy School of Government (2004). He was often asked to speak about his violence prevention program. He is a vocal critic of the federal Secure Communities deportation program.

Hennessey also was an early proponent of a new technique for jail management, called Direct Supervision in the jail, in the jail, located on San Francisco's watershed land in San Bruno. This method of creating a dialogue with prisoners in the jails was also accompanied by the construction of two new San Francisco jails that were designed to maximize visual supervision and to eliminate "blind spots" from staff observation. The result has been safer jails almost completely eliminating escapes, sexual assaults and other inmate misconduct.. Unfortunately all of San Francisco's current jails, all built under Michael Hennessy's watch have a fatal flaw. They were all built without any outdoor space for the prisoners. Prisoners in San Francisco's jails, are warehoused 24/7 under artificial lights. Current science shows that human beings require sunlight to set human circadian rhythm. Disruption of the human circadian rhythmn disrupts sleep and human sleep rhythms. Humans have a molecular clock in all metabolic tissues. And without the sun's rays on skin, humans' molecular clocks become misaligned and human metabolic tissues dysfunction so humans develop serious chronic illnesses including diabetes, cardiovascular disease, metabolic diseases, and cancers. In 2019, prisoners at the San Bruno Jail and the now closed 850 Bryant Jail filed a class action lawsuit alleging that the jail created a dangerous condition for them by denying all prisoners any access to sunlight.

California's Uniform Building Code has long required outdoor exercise yards for all inmates. See Title 24, Section 1231.2.10

Another controversial effort by Hennessey was to introduce AIDS education to both inmates and staff in the jails. Hennessey began this program very early in the AIDS crisis which hit San Francisco's large gay population especially hard. As a result of his efforts in this field, Law Enforcement News, a publication of the John Jay College of Criminal Justice in New York, named Hennessey "Law Enforcement Man of the Year". These and other efforts led to Hennessey being called "The Best Sheriff in America" by Salon.com.

Hennessey also expanded the duties of the San Francisco Sheriff's Department to include helping provide security for visiting dignitaries, including sitting Presidents, heads of state and Pope John Paul II. During Hennessey's tenure, the department also was tasked with providing building security in San Francisco's City Hall, in San Francisco General Hospital and several other public buildings.

Hennessey's other interests of note are researching and writing about the history of the San Francisco Sheriff's Department, riding a horse in local parades with a group called the San Francisco Sheriff's Mounted Posse, and a quirky interest in San Francisco's punk rock culture. He is widely quoted in a recent history of the local punk rock scene, Gimme Something Better, by Jack Boulware and Spike Tudor.

Among the rehabilitation programs started by Hennessey are:

- Prisoner Legal Services (1974)
- Eviction Assistance (1980)
- SWAP (Sheriff's Work Alternative Program) and other alternatives to incarceration (1984)
- SISTERS (A therapeutic community approach to substance abuse for women)
- Roads to Recovery (A therapeutic community substance abuse program for male prisoners)
- RSVP (A therapeutic community program for violent offenders)
- The Garden Project/Earth Stewards
- PREP (A Post Release Education and Employment Program)
- Medea Project (Rhodessa Jones) (A Women's theater/therapy program)
- Collaboration with Community Works, Arts Programs
- HIV/AIDS Training
- Condoms in jails
- New San Bruno Facility (Closed the oldest jail in California)
- Five Keys Charter School
- Women's Reentry Center
- RSVP Day with The Giants
- Veteran's Program (COVER)

Police appointments
Preceded by Eugene A. Brown	Sheriff of the City and County of San Francisco; 1980-2012	Succeeded by Ross Mirkarimi
