= Thomas F. Finn =

American politician

- Finn c. 1927

Sheriff of San Francisco
- In office January 8, 1916 – January 8, 1928
- Preceded by: Frederick Eggers
- Succeeded by: William J. Fitzgerald
- In office January 8, 1910 – January 8, 1912
- Preceded by: Lawrence J. Dolan
- Succeeded by: Frederick Eggers

Member of the California Senate
- In office January 4, 1909 – January 8, 1917
- Preceded by: Frank A. Markey
- Succeeded by: Walter A. McDonald
- Constituency: 17th district (1909–1913); 23rd district (1913–1917)

Member of the San Francisco Board of Supervisors
- In office January 8, 1904 – January 31, 1905
- Preceded by: Peter J. Curtis
- Succeeded by: James L. Gallagher

Member of the California State Assembly from the 29th district
- In office January 5, 1903 – January 6, 1904
- Preceded by: Jeremiah F. Collins
- Succeeded by: John A. Cullen
Appointed offices
Member of the San Francisco Board of Police Commissioners
In office March 26, 1907 – August 21, 1907
Appointed by	Eugene Schmitz
Preceded by	H. M. Alexander
Succeeded by	Hugo D. Keil
Undersheriff of San Francisco
In office January 8, 1906 – March 26, 1907
Appointed by	Thomas F. O'Neil
Preceded by	William D. Hynes
Succeeded by	Frank J. Burke
President of the San Francisco Board of Fire Commissioners
In office February 4, 1905 – January 8, 1906
Preceded by	J. George Boyne
Succeeded by	Henry M. Wreden
Member of the San Francisco Board of Fire Commissioners
In office February 4, 1905 – January 8, 1906
Appointed by	Eugene Schmitz
Preceded by	J. George Boyne
Succeeded by	Mario Bollo

Personal details
- Born: Thomas Francis Finn; November 23, 1873 San Francisco, California, U.S.
- Died: January 5, 1938 (aged 64) San Francisco, California, U.S.
- Resting place: Holy Cross Cemetery
- Party: Republican; Union Labor
- Other political affiliations: Democratic (1902–1905)
- Spouse(s): Catherine McGee (m. 1907; died 1932) Elizabeth McInnes (m. 1937)
- Occupation: Stableman, labor leader, clerk, politician, sheriff
- Nickname(s): "Tom" "Boss Finn"

Thomas Francis "Tom" Finn (November 23, 1873 – January 5, 1938) was an American labor leader and politician who served four non-consecutive terms as sheriff of San Francisco from 1910 to 1912 and again from 1916 to 1928. He also served in the California State Assembly from 1903 to 1904, the San Francisco Board of Supervisors from 1904 to 1905, and the California State Senate from 1909 to 1917, in addition to several appointed offices.

Born in South of Market, San Francisco to Irish immigrants, Finn joined the Stablemen’s Union and rose through the ranks of the Union Labor and Republican parties. Though he avoided the political scandals of the former, he nonetheless earned a reputation as a political power broker along with the nickname "Boss Finn."

== Sources ==
- "NEW COMMISSIONER IS CHOSEN AS PRESIDENT". San Francisco Examiner. San Francisco. February 5, 1905.
- "MAYOR MAKES ANNOUNCEMENT OF SOME NEW APPOINTMENTS". The San Francisco Call. San Francisco. December 29, 1905.
- "PLUMS FALL AT CITY HALL". The San Francisco Call. San Francisco. December 30, 1905.
- "FINN APPOINTED TO POLICE BOARD". San Francisco Examiner. San Francisco. March 27, 1907.
- "New Commission Takes Office, Dinan Resigns and Rule of Vice Ends". The San Francisco Call. San Francisco. August 23, 1907.
