= Paul Miyamoto =

American politician

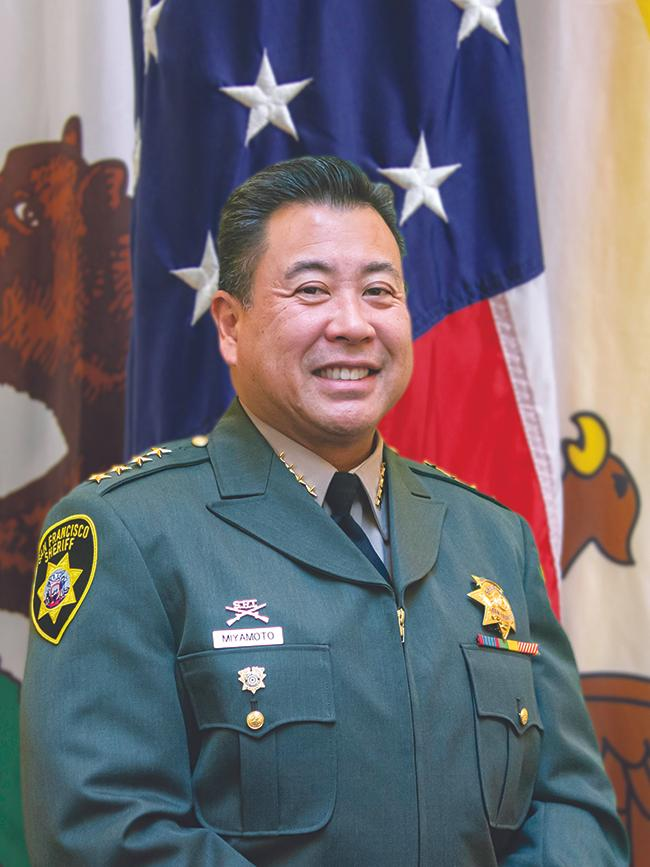
- Official portrait, 2020

Sheriff of San Francisco
- Incumbent
- Assumed office January 8, 2020
- Mayor: London Breed; Daniel Lurie
- Preceded by: Vicki Hennessy

Personal details
- Spouse: LeeAnn
- Education: University of California, Davis
- Police career
- Department: San Francisco Sheriff's Department
- Service years: 1996–present
- Rank: Sheriff (2020–present)

Paul Miyamoto is an American politician. He is the 37th sheriff of San Francisco, the second East Asian American sheriff in California history and the second from the department to be elected into office.

== Early life ==
Miyamoto is a native of San Francisco and a graduate of Lowell High School. His father was Philip Miyamoto, an appellate judge for the state of California of Japanese descent. His mother is of Chinese descent.

Miyamoto graduated from University of California, Davis in 1989.

== San Francisco Sheriff's Department ==
Miyamoto joined the San Francisco Sheriff's Department in 1996.

=== Sheriff ===
He first ran for sheriff in 2011, placing second against Ross Mirkarimi. Mirkarimi promoted him from Captain to Assistant Sheriff in February 2012.

Miyamoto was Chief Deputy when he ran for sheriff to succeed Vicki Hennessy in 2019. He ran unopposed after his opponent Ron Terry dropped out of the race. He was sworn in on January 8, 2020, as the city's 37th sheriff.

In March 2020, at the beginning of the COVID-19 pandemic in San Francisco, Miyamoto suspended county jail visits and programs to preemptively stop the spread of COVID-19. Non-contact visits with legal counsel were permitted.

In July 2025, Miyamoto endorsed the Republican Sheriff of Riverside County, Chad Bianco, for Governor of California in 2026.

== Personal life ==
Miyamoto's family was interned during WWII at Heart Mountain Relocation Center. His grand-uncles served in 442nd Infantry Regiment. He is married with five children.

Miyamoto said that films like The Choirboys (1977) and End of Watch (2012) and television show Hill Street Blues (1981–1987) depict an accurate portrayal of law enforcement.
