= Matthew Carberry =

American sheriff

Matthew C. Carberry
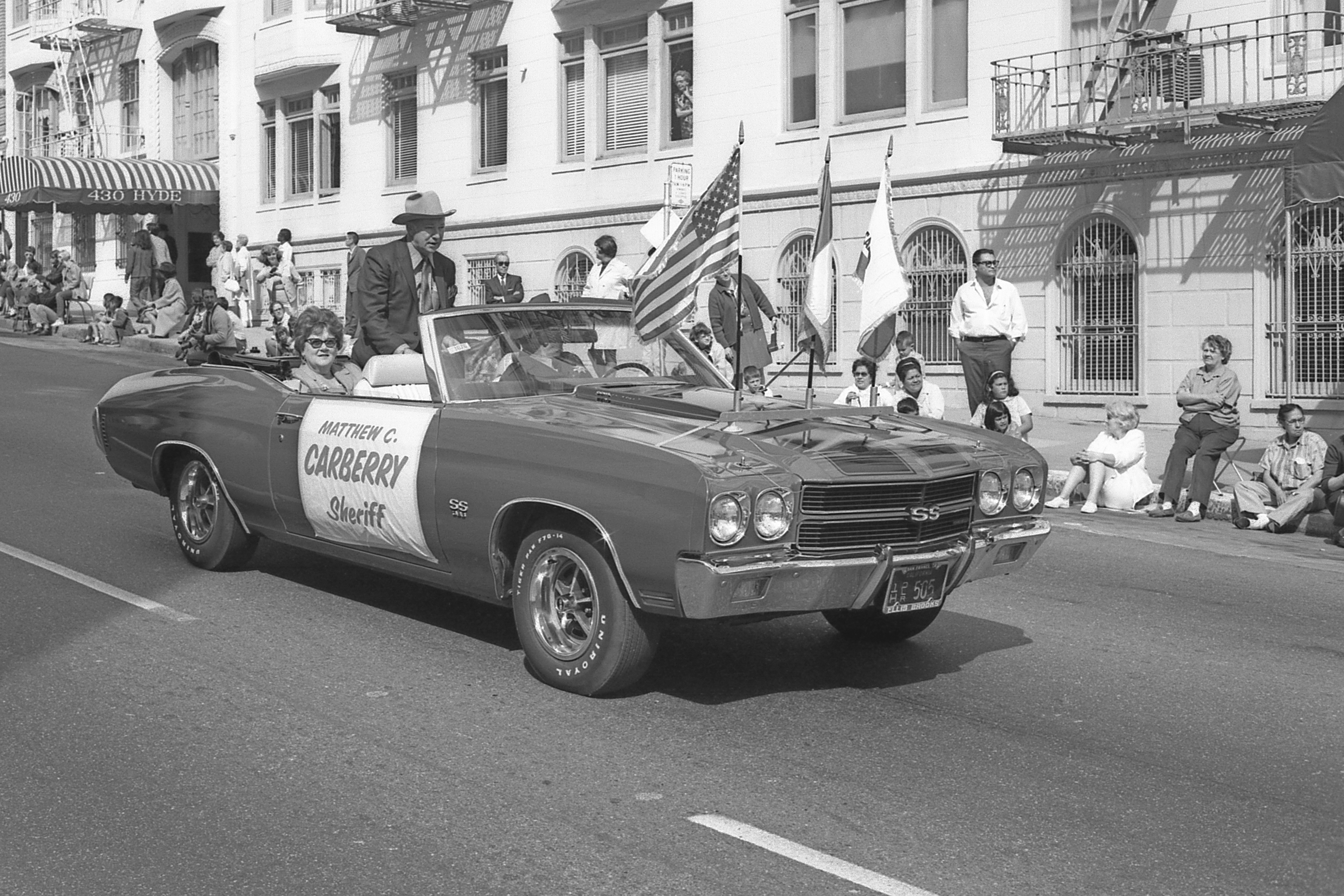
- Carberry in 1970

Sheriff of the City and County of San Francisco
- In office May 11, 1956 – January 8, 1972
- Preceded by: Daniel Gallagher
- Succeeded by: Richard Hongisto

Personal details
- Born: July 31, 1911
- Died: May 8, 1986 (aged 74)
- Party: Republican

Matthew C. Carberry (July 31, 1911 – May 8, 1986) was the Sheriff of the City and County of San Francisco from 1956 to 1972. He was appointed by Mayor George Christopher after the death of Sheriff Daniel Gallagher. A moderate conservative, he was defeated in his bid for a fifth term by the more liberal Richard Hongisto in the fall of 1971. Prior to being appointed Sheriff, he served on the San Francisco Board of Supervisors and was president of the fire commission.

Police appointments
Preceded by Daniel Gallagher	Sheriff of the City and County of San Francisco; 1956-1972	Succeeded by Richard Hongisto
