= Vicki Hennessy =

California sheriff

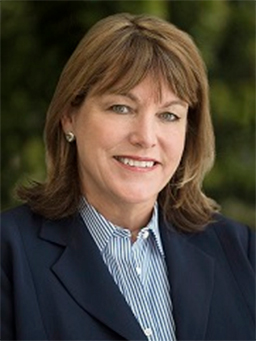

Sheriff of San Francisco
- In office January 8, 2016 – January 8, 2020
- Mayor: Ed Lee; Mark Farrell; London Breed
- Preceded by: Ross Mirkarimi
- Succeeded by: Paul Miyamoto
- In office March 21, 2012 – October 9, 2012 (Interim)
- Mayor: Ed Lee
- Preceded by: Ross Mirkarimi
- Succeeded by: Ross Mirkarimi

Vicki Hennessy was the sheriff of San Francisco and the city's first female sheriff. She was appointed interim sheriff by Mayor Ed Lee pending an ethics investigation of the elected sheriff, Ross Mirkarimi, who was charged with domestic violence battery and later agreed to a plea bargain in which he pleaded guilty to misdemeanor false imprisonment. She is not related to former San Francisco Sheriff Michael Hennessey.

Hennessy is a native of San Francisco and a graduate of Lowell High School. Her husband is a retired San Francisco police officer. She is the mother of two grown children.

== Career ==
In December 1975, Hennessy joined the San Francisco Sheriff's Department, reached the rank of captain in 1983 (becoming the youngest in California), and became chief deputy sheriff in 1997. In 2006, she became the deputy director of the San Francisco Department of Emergency Services and Homeland Security, and from 2008 to 2011 she was San Francisco's director of emergency management. She retired in 2011, but came out of retirement in 2012 to become interim sheriff during the six-month period in which Sheriff Ross Mirkarimi was suspended.

== 2015 campaign for sheriff ==
On November 17, 2014, Hennessy announced that she would run for sheriff of San Francisco. In March 2015, she received the endorsement of the one hundred members of the San Francisco Sheriff's Managers and Supervisors Association, 77 percent of whom voted to endorse Hennessy. Hennessy defeated incumbent Sheriff Ross Mirkarimi with 61 percent of the vote.
