= Rhodessa Jones =

Performing arts director, teacher, and activist (born 1948)

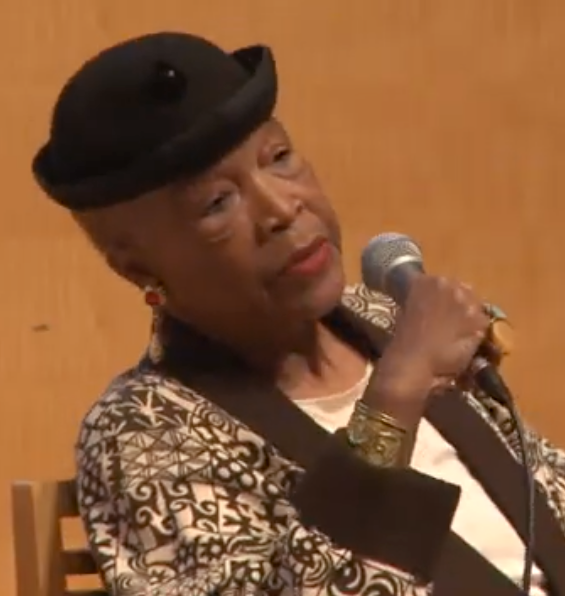
- In a panel discussion at the San Francisco Public Library in 2024
- Born: 1948 (age 77–78)
- Known for: Performing arts
- Awards: Otto Rene Castillo Award for Political Theater, GOLDIE Lifetime Achievement Award, Theatre Practitioner Award, Theatre Bay Legacy Award, Artistic Legacy Grant

Rhodessa Jones (born 1948) is a San Francisco-based director, teacher, writer, and political activist. She is the Co-Artistic Director of the San Francisco performance company Cultural Odyssey, and best known for her work as Founder and Artistic Director of the Medea Project: Theater for Incarcerated Women, a performance workshop designed to uplift incarcerated women and women living with HIV in the United States and South Africa. In 2015, she was appointed as a Visiting Professor at Saint Mary's College in Moraga, California. From 2017 to 2020, Jones served as the Frank H.T. Rhodes Class of 1956 Visiting professor at Cornell University.

== Career ==
Jones has been the Co-Artistic Director of Cultural Odyssey since 1979. In 1987, she began teaching aerobics to incarcerated women at the San Francisco County Jail and, inspired by the women who shared their personal stories during her classes, she founded the Medea Project: Theater for Incarcerated Women in 1989. The project, named after the Greek myth of Medea, seeks to empower women of color in jail by giving them the chance to tell their lived experience through performance pieces—from who they were before incarceration, to who they are now and the variety of circumstances that led to their time in jail. In 1992, Medea Project workshops took place at the San Bruno County Jail, which resulted in the performance piece Reality Is Just Outside the Window. Other early productions relating to the project are Food Taboos in the Land of the Dead (1993), A Taste of Somewhere Else: A Place at the Table (1994), Buried Fire (1996), and Requiem for a Dead Love (1998).

Some of her solo monologue pieces include Big Butt Girls, Hard Headed Women, which premiered in 1991 and received the Bessie Award in 1993, and The Blues Stories: Black Erotica About Letting Go, an autobiographical piece. Jones has also been involved in other productions, such as The Mother of Three Sons (1990), Perfect Courage (1991), and Raining Down Stars (1992).

Jones' work has been featured in the Japanese documentary film Talk Back Live directed by Kaori Sakagami, as well as various publications, including Let's Get It On: The Politics of Black Performance (1995), Colored Contradictions: An Anthology of Contemporary African American Plays (1996), Imagining Medea: Rhodessa Jones and Theater for Incarcerated Women (2001), Conversations with Great Teachers (2010), Solo/Black/Woman: Performing Global Traditions and Local Intervention (2013), Staging Migrations Toward an American West: From Ida B. Wells to Rhodessa Jones (2014), and A Beginner's Guide to Community-Based Arts (2017).

== Awards ==
Jones has received numerous awards for her work. In 2002, she was given the Otto Rene Castillo Award for Political Theater and the GOLDIE Lifetime Achievement Award in 2003. She received an honorary doctorate from the California College of the Arts in 2004, and was the recipient of the United States Artists Fellowship in 2007. In 2015, she was awarded the Theatre Practitioner Award by the Theater Communications Group, which recognizes an individual whose work has contributed significantly to the American Theatre and demonstrated exemplary achievement over time. In 2016, she received the Theatre Bay Legacy Award for her contributions to theater in the San Francisco Bay area. That same year, she was named the Montgomery Fellow at Dartmouth College. In 2020, Jones was the Pew Fellow in Residence. She was also the 2024 awardee of the Artistic Legacy Grant by the San Francisco Arts Commission.
