= Crime in San Francisco =

San Francisco
- Crime rates* (2019)

Violent crimes
- Homicide: 4.5
- Rape: 36.6
- Robbery: 344.8
- Aggravated assault: 283.7
- Total violent crime: 669.6

Property crimes
- Burglary: 524.1
- Larceny-theft: 4,501.8
- Motor vehicle theft: 479.6
- Arson: 31
- Total property crime: 5,505.6
- Note: Reported crimes per 100,000 population Source: FBI 2019 UCR data

As of 2023, San Francisco had lower-than-average rates of violent crime when compared with other major U.S. cities, while property crimes, such as theft and burglary, are higher than the national average.

== Crime ==
In 2023, crime dropped by 7%, and in 2024, violent crime and property crime decreased by 14% and 30% respectively, compared to the prior year. 2024 also saw 35 homicides in the city, which is a low not seen since 1961, giving the city a homicide rate of around 4 per 100,000 residents.

In 2011, 50 murders were reported, which is 6.1 per 100,000 people. This coincided with a period when California's homicide rate fell to a 44-year low. That rate, though, did rise again by the close of 2016. According to the San Francisco Police Department, there were 59 murders in the city in 2016, an annual total that marked a 13.5% increase in the number of homicides (52) from 2015.

In November 2021, San Francisco District Attorney Chesa Boudin’s office stated that about 2% of auto burglaries in San Francisco result in an arrest.

=== Gangs ===
The Sureños and Norteños are known to operate in the Mission District.

African-American street gangs familiar in other cities, including the Bloods, Crips and their sets, have struggled to establish footholds in San Francisco, while police and prosecutors have been accused of liberally labeling young African-American males as gang members. However, gangs founded in San Francisco with majority Black memberships have made their presence in the city. The gang Westmob, associated with Oakdale Mob and Sunnydale housing project gangs from the southeast area of the city, was involved in a gang war with Hunters Point-based Big Block from 1999 to the 2000s. They claim territory from West Point to Middle Point in the Hunters Point projects. In 2004, a Westmob member fatally shot a SFPD officer and wounded his partner; he was sentenced to life without parole in 2007.

Other criminal gangs, such as Triad groups such like the Wo Hop To, have been reported active in San Francisco. In 1977, an ongoing rivalry between two Chinese gangs led to a shooting attack at the Golden Dragon restaurant in Chinatown, which left 5 people dead and 11 wounded. None of the victims in this attack were gang members. Five members of the Joe Boys gang were arrested and convicted of the crime. In 1990, a gang-related shooting killed one man and wounded six others outside a nightclub near Chinatown. In 1998, six teenagers were shot and wounded at the Chinese Playground; a 16-year-old boy was subsequently arrested.

=== Shoplifting ===
As of 2024, San Francisco has received significant attention for shoplifting incidents, with videos of such occurrences gaining widespread attention on social media. While some reports suggest that shoplifting has contributed to store closures in the city, others state that the reports suggest that there's reason to doubt shoplifting as the reason for store closures. For example, Walgreens stated that it was closing stores in San Francisco due to shoplifting, however an analysis by the San Francisco Chronicle found that the data does not support Walgreens' explanation. The analysis also noted that the chain had announced a plan in 2017 to close 600 stores nationwide. San Francisco Supervisor Dean Preston said "Two things are true: Walgreens has experienced retail theft, and Walgreens has long planned to close stores. We do not know which factor or factors led to the decision to close 300 Gough and other San Francisco stores." On an earnings call in January, 2023, Walgreens CFO James Kehoe said "'Maybe we cried too much last year' about merchandise losses."

Brad Polumbo, a self-described "libertarian-conservative journalist" at the Foundation for Economic Education think-tank speculated, without data, that the rise in shoplifting is linked to a 2014 ballot initiative that reclassified thefts under $950 from a felony to a misdemeanor. However, the San Francisco Chronicle reported that "overall shoplifting incidents reported to the police are below their levels before the start of the pandemic," and that "shoplifting rates had been decreasing more or less steadily since the 1980s." Magnus Lofstrom, policy director at the Public Policy Institute of California, a non-profit research institution, noted that it's difficult to predict what will happen to the crime rates in the city, as the underlying causes vary from "population density to economic inequality".

== SFPD ==
As of August 2022 SFPD had 300 fewer sworn officers than the optimal level determined in a report commissioned by the San Francisco Police Commission and compiled by Matrix Consulting Group.

San Francisco 26.4 officers per 10,000 residents which results in "a disproportionately large police force compared with other cities its size." That figure doesn't include commuters and tourists. Similar sized cities such as Indianapolis, Charlotte, and Seattle have 18.6, 19.4, and 19.8 officers per 10,000 residents.

== Criminal justice system ==
By August 2024, the San Francisco County Superior Court was so overwhelmed with criminal cases that it had no choice but to dismiss 70 misdemeanor cases due to the unavailability of judges and courtrooms to hold speedy trials. One of the cases thus dismissed was a misdemeanor vehicular manslaughter case arising from a May 2022 crash which killed two Florida tourists.

== Perceptions of safety ==
In September 2022, the San Francisco Chronicle reported that a poll of 1,653 city residents found that over the past five years, 45% of San Francisco residents had been the victim of theft and 24% had either been threatened with violence or had been the victim of a violent crime. Over the next two years, property crime saw an uptick in San Francisco's western neighborhoods, including the Sunset District and the Richmond District, however the Richmond "remains one of the city’s safest and reported violent crime is down in the neighborhood so far this year compared with the same period in 2023."

On February 18, 2024, during the NBA All-Star Game, Charles Barkley harshly criticized San Francisco in on-air comments for its "homeless crooks" and for being a city so dangerous that one needed "a bulletproof vest and security" just to "walk around".

Traffic-related accidents have been a major concern in San Francisco and Bay Area at large; the March 16, 2024 West Portal, San Francisco car accident that killed 4 family members, including two infant boys, was a major outcry in the city for change of traffic-related infrastructure and enforcing more traffic laws on reckless or speeding drivers.

== See also ==
- Attempted assassination of Gerald Ford in San Francisco
- History of the San Francisco Police Department
- Resolve to Stop Violence Project
- San Francisco Committee of Vigilance
- San Francisco District Attorney's Office
