= Daniel Gallagher (sheriff) =

American politician

Member of the California State Assembly from the 23rd district
- In office January 2, 1939 – January 7, 1942
- Preceded by: William B. Hornblower
- Succeeded by: William Clifton Berry

Personal details
- Born: September 6, 1896
- Died: March 6, 1956 (aged 59)
- Party: Democratic

Daniel Gallagher (September 6, 1896 – May 6, 1956) was the Sheriff of the City and County of San Francisco from 1952–56. During his tenure he fought for prison reform and higher pay for women employees. Prior to being appointed Sheriff, he was a member of the San Francisco Board of Supervisors.

Gallagher also served as a member of the California State Assembly for the 23rd district from 1939 to 1942.

Police appointments
Preceded by Daniel C. Murphy	Sheriff of the City and County of San Francisco; 1952–1956	Succeeded by Matthew Carberry
