= San Francisco County Jails =

The San Francisco Hall of Justice Complex. County Jails #3 and #4 are on the 6th and 7th floors, and Jails #1 and #2 are in the undulating structure on the north side.

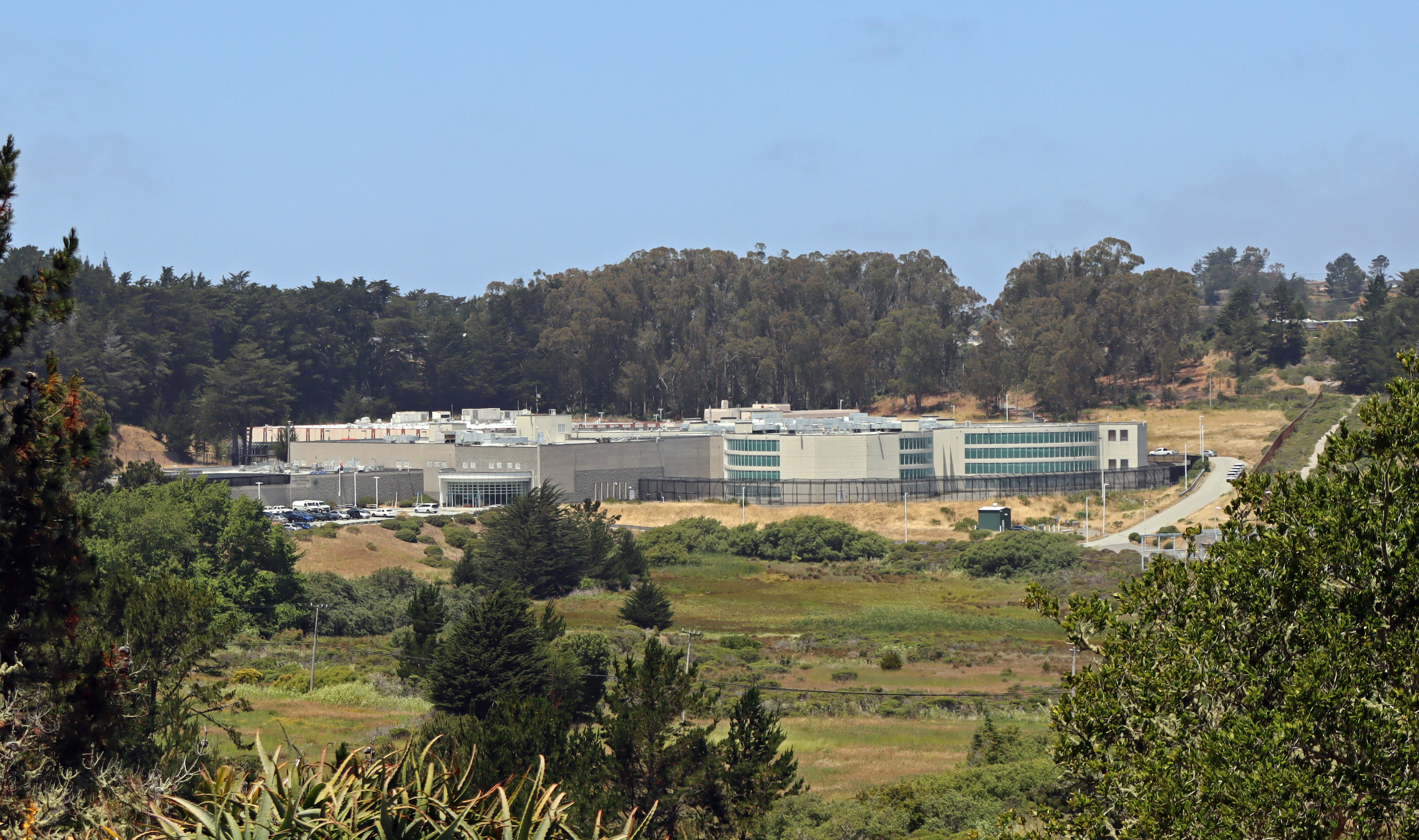
Current County Jail #3 (former County Jail #5), San Bruno.

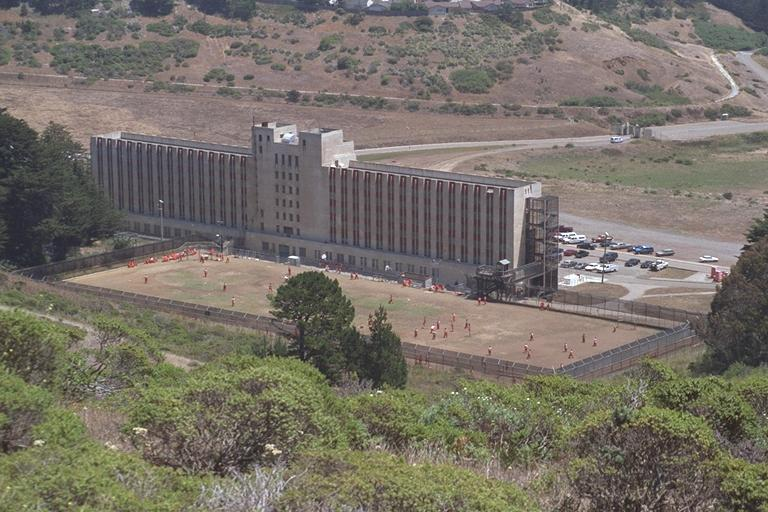
Former County Jail #3, San Bruno, 1934 - 2006. This jail was demolished in 2012.

San Francisco County Jails are operated by the Sheriff's Department Custody Division of the City and County of San Francisco. The system comprises eight jails, with approximately 55,000 annual bookings administered by 800 deputy sheriffs.

== Facilities ==
Two of these jails are located in the Hall of Justice on Bryant Street. One of the jails is located in ward 7D/7L in San Francisco General Hospital. Two jails are located at the San Bruno Complex Program Facility, located ten miles south of San Francisco.

The newest San Francisco jail complex is located near the Hall of Justice on Seventh Street. Opened in 1994, the complex is actually two jails. This main complex jail is a "direct supervision facility [that] has become a national model for program-oriented prisoner rehabilitation." The second, which acts as the main intake and release facility for the city, was praised by Pulitzer Prize-winning architecture critic Allan Temko as "a stunning victory for architectural freedom over bureaucratic stupidity."

The first jail established in San Francisco was demanded by the Alcalde, later first mayor, John W. Geary and set up in a beached brig, the Ephemia on the shore of Yerba Buena Cove. Later there was a jail on Broadway and jails within the two halls of justice on the east side of Portsmouth Square. The fourth floor of the post-earthquake Hall of Justice on Kearny Street served as a jail until 1961, when the present Hall of Justice at 850 Bryant Street opened.

The Ingleside Jail opened in 1872 on the present site of the City College of San Francisco. It served as the largest jail in the city. When the former County Jail 3 opened in San Bruno in 1934, the Ingleside Jail was demolished and the construction of City College commenced. The former County Jail #3 closed in 2006, after over 70 years of service, replaced by the modern direct-supervision facility, County Jail #5. The 1934 San Bruno jail was demolished in 2012. County Jail #5 was later renamed to County Jail #3.

Intake & Release

- County Jail 1 (425 7th Street)

Classification

- County Jail 2 (425 7th Street)

Housing

- County Jail 2 (425 7th Street)
- County Jail 3 (Hall of Justice, 850 Bryant Street, 6th Floor)
- County Jail 4 (Hall of Justice, 850 Bryant Street, 7th Floor)
- County Jail 5 (1 Moreland Drive, San Bruno) 37.627°N 122.46°W (New state-of-the-art facility opened in 2006)
- County Jail 6 (1 Moreland Drive, San Bruno)
- County Jail 7 (Ward 7D/7L of San Francisco General Hospital)

== Abuse ==
=== 2025 deputy sexual assaults ===
The San Francisco Sheriff's Office fired a county deputy sheriff in October 2025 for an instance of sexual assault of an incarcerated woman in County Jail 2. This led to formal charges against the deputy in July 2026, with the district attorney alleging that the deputy instructed the victim to perform oral sex in the jail’s restroom with a threat of retaliation. Another deputy sheriff at County Jail 2 was charged in July 2026 for an alleged groping of a woman in custody in the summer of 2025.

=== 2025 mass strip-search video recording ===
At least 19 women have accused San Francisco sheriff's deputies of subjecting them to a mass strip-search while male officers recorded with their body cameras inside the B-Pod of County Jail 2 on May 22, 2025. Many of the women involved have active lawsuits against the city. Over 30 community organizations demanded action to the mayor and board of supervisors including suspension of the deputies involved. As a result, the board of supervisors began investigating jail conditions, which included a public hearing on March 12, 2026. At that hearing, the Sheriff also stated that the deputies violated sheriff department policy and were reassigned but have otherwise received impunity.

== Resolve to Stop Violence Project ==
Violent inmates who are willing to change may participate in the Resolve to Stop Violence Project (RSVP), a partnership with Community Works West that aims to reduce community violence and recidivism.
