= Ed Lee =

43rd Mayor of San Francisco

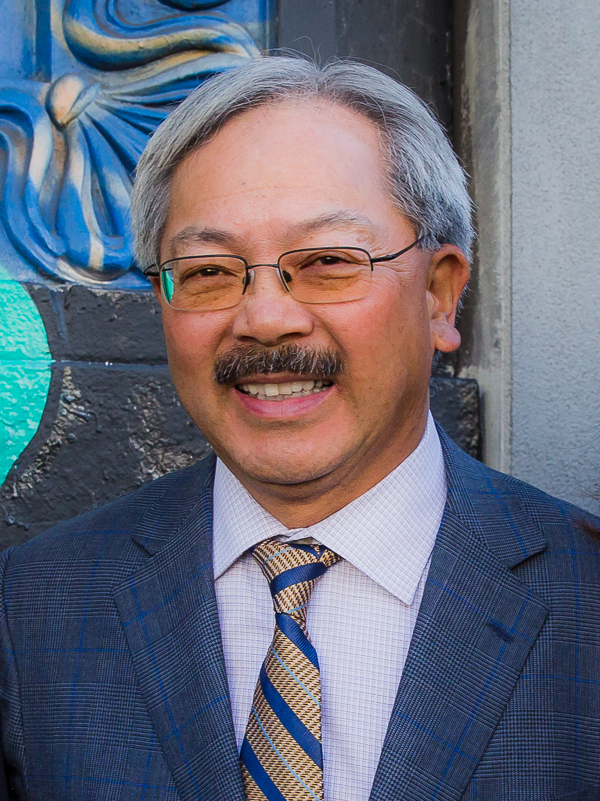
- Lee in 2013

43rd Mayor of San Francisco
- In office January 11, 2011 – December 12, 2017
- Preceded by: Gavin Newsom
- Succeeded by: London Breed

City Administrator of San Francisco
- In office June 22, 2005 – January 11, 2011
- Preceded by: William Lee
- Succeeded by: Naomi Kelly

Personal details
- Born: Edwin Mah Lee; May 5, 1952 Seattle, Washington, U.S.
- Died: December 12, 2017 (aged 65) San Francisco, California, U.S.
- Resting place: Cypress Lawn Memorial Park
- Party: Democratic
- Spouse: Anita Lee (m. 1980)
- Children: 2
- Education: Bowdoin College (BA); University of California, Berkeley (JD)

Ed Lee
- Traditional Chinese: 李孟賢
- Simplified Chinese: 李孟贤
Transcriptions
Standard Mandarin
- Hanyu Pinyin: Lǐ Mèngxián
- IPA: [lì mə̂ŋɕjɛ̌n]
Yue: Cantonese
- Yale Romanization: Léih Máahngyìhn
- Jyutping: lei5 maang5 jin4

Edwin Mah Lee (May 5, 1952 – December 12, 2017) was an American politician and attorney who served as the 43rd Mayor of San Francisco from 2011 until his death in 2017.

Born in Seattle to Chinese American parents, Lee was a member of the Democratic Party. He took office as San Francisco city administrator in 2005 and was appointed on January 11, 2011, by the Board of Supervisors to serve out the remaining term of former mayor Gavin Newsom after Newsom resigned to become Lieutenant Governor of California. On November 8, 2011, he won the election to serve a full term as mayor. He was reelected in 2015.

== Early life and career ==
Lee was born in 1952 in the Beacon Hill neighborhood of Seattle, Washington. His parents immigrated to the United States from Taishan, Guangdong, China, in the 1930s. Lee's father, Gok Suey Lee, fought in the Korean War, worked as a cook, and managed a restaurant in Seattle. He died when Lee was 15. His mother was a seamstress and waitress. Lee had five siblings. He attended Franklin High School, before graduating summa cum laude from Bowdoin College in Maine in 1974, completed a year overseas as a Watson Fellow, and then graduated from the University of California, Berkeley, School of Law in 1978.

== San Francisco government ==
After Lee completed law school and received his Juris Doctor degree from UC Berkeley School of Law, he worked as managing attorney for the San Francisco Asian Law Caucus, where he was an advocate for affordable housing and the rights of immigrants and renters. In 1989, Mayor Art Agnos appointed Lee to be the city's first investigator under the city's whistleblower ordinance. Agnos later appointed him deputy director of Human Relations. In 1991, he was hired as executive director of the San Francisco Human Rights Commission, serving in that capacity under Mayors Agnos, Frank Jordan, and Willie Brown. Brown appointed him director of city purchasing, where, among other responsibilities, he ran the city's first Minority/Women-Owned Business Enterprise program.

In 2000, he was appointed director of public works for the city, and in 2005 was appointed by Mayor Newsom to a five-year term as city administrator, to which he was reappointed in 2010. As city administrator, Lee oversaw the reduction of city government and implemented the city's first ever ten-year capital plan.

== Appointment as mayor ==
In 2010 a vacancy in the office of mayor was impending when incumbent Gavin Newsom was elected as Lieutenant Governor of California. Under the San Francisco City Charter, vacancies in the mayoral office are filled by a majority vote of the Board of Supervisors, in which each supervisor is barred from voting for themselves. Speculation about possible appointees and debate on whether or not the old board of supervisors should cast the vote for the new mayor soon followed Newsom's election as lieutenant governor. (Four old supervisors were term-limited and four new people were elected in the 2010 election to take their place.)

The board of supervisors nominated four people—former mayor Art Agnos, Sheriff Michael Hennessey, former board of supervisors president Aaron Peskin, and Lee. None of them captured the necessary six votes at a meeting of the board on January 4, 2011, but after debate, some supervisors expressed willingness to switch their support to Lee, and the meeting was recessed until January 7. At the January 7 meeting, the old board voted 10–1 to elect Lee as mayor, with outgoing Supervisor Chris Daly casting the lone "no" vote. At the time, Lee promised not to seek election if appointed, a statement that helped to gain support for his appointment. The board included people who aimed to run in the November 2011 mayoral elections, none of whom wished to give the mayoral position to someone who might be their competitor in those elections, which would give that person the significant political advantages of incumbency.

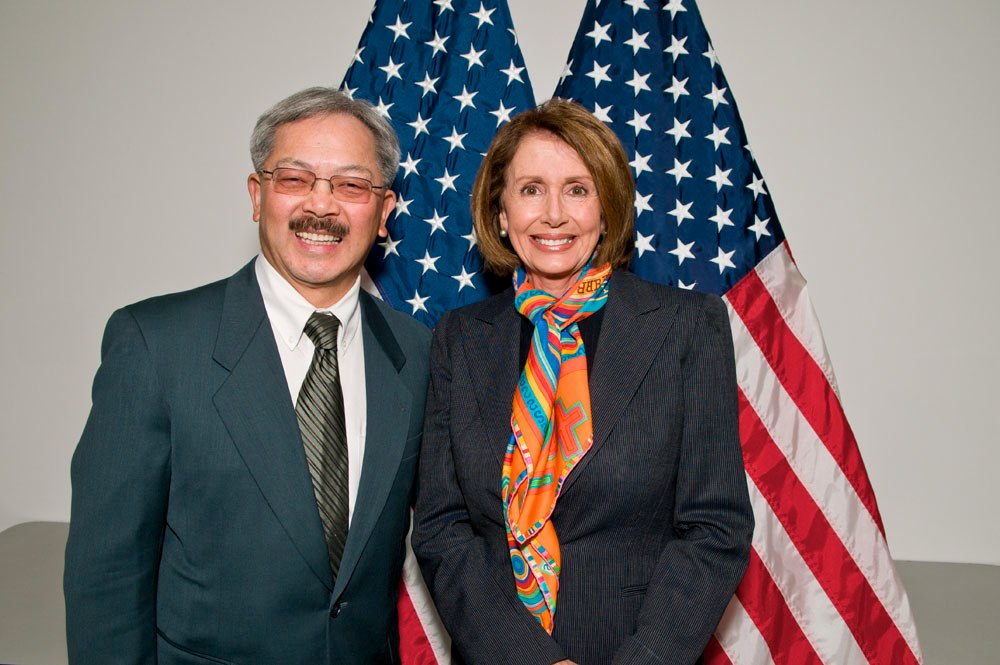
Lee with Democratic U.S. House Leader Nancy Pelosi

The vote was preliminary and non-binding, as Newsom had delayed his resignation until new members of the board took office. A final vote was taken on January 11 by the new board to confirm Lee, one day after Newsom's resignation. The board voted unanimously for Lee and he took office immediately thereafter.

== Mayoral elections ==
=== 2011 election ===
Lee's term expired in January 2012, when the winner of the November 2011 mayoral election would assume office. Lee originally pledged not to run in that election. However, some San Francisco political activists – including Rose Pak, consultant for the San Francisco Chinese Chamber of Commerce, Planning Commission President Christina Olague, Assistant District Attorney Victor Hwang, 'Progress for All' chief consultant, Enrique Pearce and Eddy Zheng – started a "Run Ed Run" campaign in June 2011 to encourage him to put his name on the ballot. By July 28, Lee stated that he had visited his daughters in Washington state and discussed with them the possibility of running, but had still not made up his mind. Senator Dianne Feinstein, herself a former appointee mayor who had gone on to win reelection for two terms, publicly supported a Lee candidacy. The San Francisco Chronicle wrote that unnamed city officials close to Lee told the media that Lee had "nearly finalized his decision" to run.

On August 7, 2011, Lee reneged on his promise to the San Francisco board of supervisors and formally announced his decision to seek election. He stated that the atmosphere of political cooperation during his months in office had inspired him to run. Lee won the November 2011 election, with John Avalos finishing second.

=== 2015 reelection ===
In an election where Lee had no challengers with substantial name recognition or experience in politics, he received 56% in the first round of instant-runoff voting. The candidate with the next most votes, local musician Francisco Herrera, received 14%.

== Mayoralty (2011–2017) ==
=== Mid-Market revitalization ===
Lee implemented a revitalization of Mid-Market, San Francisco, providing companies that moved into the area with a temporary exemption from paying San Francisco's 1.5 percent payroll tax. Twitter, which had threatened to move out of San Francisco into the San Francisco Peninsula without the tax break, moved into Mid-Market in 2011. In October 2013, Square, Inc. moved its headquarters to the mid-Market area, followed by Uber and Dolby Laboratories. In 2014, this exemption saved companies US$34 million. The plan drew controversy not only for the tax breaks given to corporations, but for the effects of gentrification on the nearby Tenderloin neighborhood.

=== Housing ===
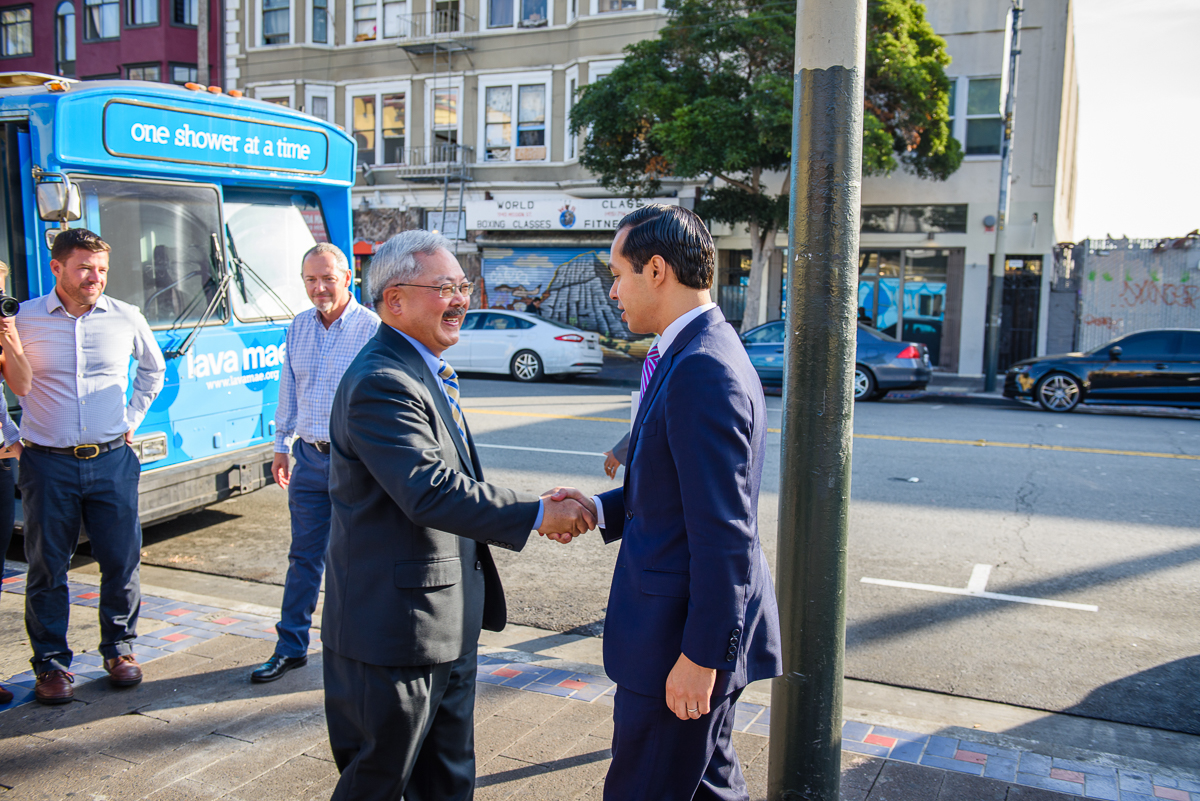
Lee with United States Secretary of Housing and Urban Development Julian Castro in 2015

In 2012, Lee proposed the creation of a Housing Trust Fund, which would generate between $20 million and $50 million of funding for affordable and middle class housing per year for thirty years. In 2014, Lee and David Chiu, the president of the board of supervisors, announced the creation of the Ellis Act Housing Preference Program, which would help people evicted from their homes by landlords using the Ellis Act. That year, Lee pledged to construct 30,000 new and rehabilitated homes throughout the city by 2020, with half available to low, working and middle income San Franciscans, and launched a small site acquisition program to fund the purchase and stabilization of multi-family rental buildings in neighborhoods that are susceptible to evictions and rising rents. Lee sponsored a $310 million bond measure to pay for housing for the November 2015 general election, which passed. In 2017, Lee approved a $44 million project to build affordable housing for teachers.

=== Minimum wage ===
In December 2013, Lee called for an increase to San Francisco's minimum wage. In 2014, the board of supervisors unanimously approved a measure to raise the city's minimum wage for the November 2014 ballot. In October 2014, Lee announced that the city's minimum wage of $10.74 per hour would be adjusted to $11.05 per hour, effective January 1, 2015.

In 2015, Lee co-chaired the minimum wage campaign with Oakland Mayor Libby Schaaf and worked with the Service Employees International Union-United Healthcare Workers West for a November ballot initiative to gradually increase California's minimum wage to $15 an hour. The California State Senate and State Assembly approved Senate Bill 3, raising the minimum wage to $15 an hour by 2022.

=== Suspension of Sheriff Ross Mirkarimi ===
On January 13, 2012, incumbent Sheriff Ross Mirkarimi was charged with domestic violence battery, child endangerment, and dissuading a witness in connection with a New Year's Eve altercation he had with his wife. On March 20, 2012, Mayor Ed Lee gave Sheriff Mirkarimi a 24-hour ultimatum to resign from his post. While jury selection was underway, Mirkarimi entered into a plea agreement with the district attorney and pled guilty to one count of misdemeanor false imprisonment. When Mirkarimi refused to resign, the mayor suspended him and appointed a temporary replacement, Vicki Hennessy. City Attorney Dennis Herrera crafted the formal complaint and sent it to the city's Ethics Commission and board of supervisors, who accepted it and then investigated Mirkarimi under misconduct charges as required by the city charter.

On August 16, the commission ruled by 4 to 1 that Mirkarimi committed official misconduct when he falsely imprisoned his wife. Six of the charges brought by the mayor matched District Attorney George Gascón's original criminal charges. Five of those were overruled, including the charge that Mirkarimi dissuaded witnesses and that he abused the power of his office. On October 9, 2012, four of the eleven San Francisco District Supervisors voted against Lee's removal of Mirkarimi as sheriff. The mayor would have needed the votes of nine board members to remove Mirkarimi.

== Personal life and death ==
Lee married his wife, Anita, in 1980. He had two daughters, Tania and Brianna. He was remembered by SFGate as "the city’s first Asian American mayor and the man who presided over San Francisco’s transformation during the recent tech boom."

At around 10:07 p.m. PST on December 11, 2017, Lee collapsed while shopping at a Safeway near his home. Lee was conscious and spoke to paramedics on the scene. He was taken to Zuckerberg San Francisco General Hospital, where he died at 1:11 a.m. on December 12, at the age of 65. His cause of death was found to be coronary artery disease, with hypertensive heart disease listed as a contributing factor. He had a history of heart disease in his family.

== Awards and honors ==
Lee graduated summa cum laude from Bowdoin College in 1974 and from University of California, Berkeley, School of Law, in 1978. In April 2011, he was awarded the inaugural Coro Community Catalyst award for "his longtime commitment to bringing together varied special interests and agendas to address the greater needs of the community".

On November 13, 2019, the International Terminal Departures Hall of San Francisco International Airport was named as "Mayor Edwin M. Lee International Terminal Departures Hall" to "honor the late Mayor Ed Lee and his contributions to the City of San Francisco and the San Francisco International Airport".

== See also ==
- History of Chinese Americans in San Francisco
- List of mayors of the 50 largest cities in the United States
- California Hall of Fame

Political offices
Preceded by Gavin Newsom	Mayor of San Francisco; 2011–2017	Succeeded by Mark Farrell
