= Gene Brown (basketball) =

American basketball player (1935–2020)

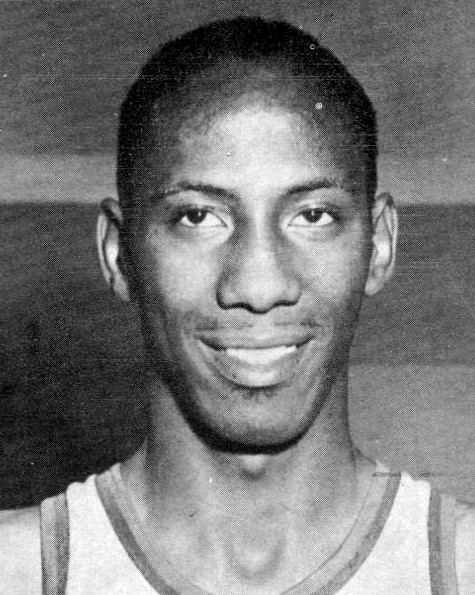
- Brown c. 1962

Personal information
- Born: November 13, 1935 San Francisco, California, U.S.
- Died: March 22, 2020 (aged 84)
- Listed height: 6 ft 3 in (1.91 m)

Career information
- High school: George Washington (San Francisco, California)
- College: San Francisco (1955–1958)
- NBA draft: 1958: 5th round, 39th overall pick
- Drafted by: Boston Celtics
- Position: Guard
- Number: 15

Career history
- 1961–1962: San Francisco Saints

Career highlights
- Third-team All-American – NABC (1958); NCAA champion (1956)
- Stats at Basketball Reference

Eugene Austin Brown (November 13, 1935 – March 22, 2020) was an American basketball player. He was an All-American at the University of San Francisco and was a player on their undefeated 1956 NCAA championship team.

== Career ==
Brown, a 6'3" guard from George Washington High School in San Francisco, played college basketball for coach Phil Woolpert at the University of San Francisco. Brown was a key reserve for the Dons' 1955–56 team, which went undefeated and won their second straight NCAA championship. Coming off the bench for most of the season, Brown was inserted into the starting lineup in the 1956 NCAA basketball tournament after star guard K. C. Jones was declared ineligible. Brown scored 16 points in the NCAA championship game against the Iowa Hawkeyes.

Brown started his last two years as the Dons returned to the 1957 Final Four, despite losing national player of the year Bill Russell. Brown led the team in scoring, averaging 15.1 points per game. He again led the team in scoring as a senior (14.2 per game) and was named a third team All-American by the National Association of Basketball Coaches and an honorable mention All-American by the Associated Press.

== Later years ==
After his basketball career ended, Brown went into careers working with young people in sports and law enforcement. He was San Francisco's first African American sheriff.

Brown died on March 22, 2020.
