= San Francisco Sheriff's Office =

Sheriff's office for the city and county of San Francisco

City and County of San Francisco Sheriff's Office
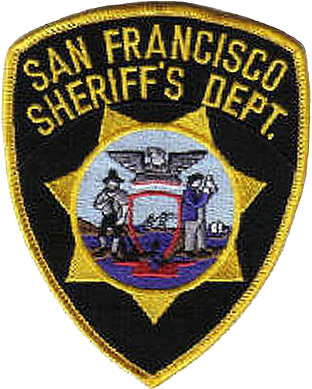
- Patch of the San Francisco Sheriff's Office

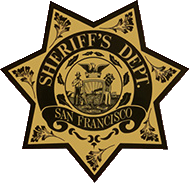
- Seal of the San Francisco Sheriff's Office

- Flag of the City and County of San Francisco
- Common name: San Francisco Sheriff's Office
- Abbreviation: SFSO

Agency overview
- Formed: 1850; 176 years ago
- Employees: 950

Jurisdictional structure
- Operations jurisdiction: City and County of San Francisco, California, United States
- Jurisdiction of San Francisco Sheriff's Department
- Legal jurisdiction: As per operations jurisdiction

Operational structure
- Deputies: 850
- Civilian employees: 100
- Sheriff responsible: Paul Miyamoto

Facilities
- Jails: 8

Website
- sfsheriff.com

The City and County of San Francisco Sheriff's Office, commonly known as the San Francisco Sheriff's Office (SFSO), is the sheriff's office for the City and County of San Francisco. The current sheriff is Paul Miyamoto. The department has 850 deputized personnel and support staff. The SFSO is a separate organization from the San Francisco Police Department. However, SFSO deputies and SFPD officers have all attended a POST-mandated police academy, and are duly sworn California peace officers.

The primary function of the SFSO is to operate the system of county jails where there is an average population of 2,200 inmates, and a number of individuals on supervised release programs.

The SFSO also provides security and law enforcement in the following locations in San Francisco: the civil and criminal court, City Hall, the Emergency Communications & Dispatch center, and the San Francisco General Hospital, Laguna Honda Hospital, and several public health clinics.

== History ==
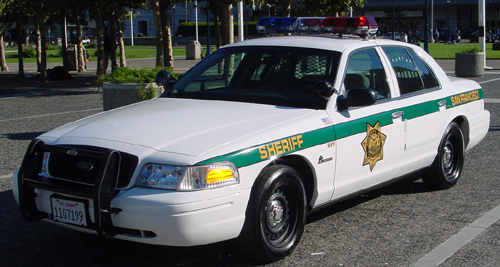
An SFSO Ford Crown Victoria Police Interceptor in October 2001.

Michael Hennessey was elected as sheriff in 1979.

Hennessey retired in 2011 as the city's longest serving sheriff. He endorsed Supervisor Ross Mirkarimi, who was elected to sheriff in the November 2011 election. In March 2012, Mayor Ed Lee appointed Vicki Hennessy as Interim Sheriff after Mirkarimi was suspended for official misconduct. With the appointment, Hennessy became the city's first female sheriff. Hennessy was elected to a full term in the November 2016 election.

Paul Miyamoto became the first Asian-American sheriff in California when he was elected in the 2019 election.

In September 2021, Supervisor Ahsha Safaí introduced legislation that would allow off-duty deputies to work as security guards at private businesses during overtime hours, like the San Francisco Police Department, amidst a rise in smash and grab retail theft. On December 7, 2021, the San Francisco Board of Supervisors voted 7–3 to approve the ordinance.

On June 8, 2023, the San Francisco Sheriff's Office unveiled plans to deploy an emergency unit of deputies at the end of June in the Tenderloin and SoMa to arrest drug dealers and compel people using drugs into treatment. The unit consists of 130 deputies who will work on overtime for six months.

=== List of Sheriffs ===
- John Coffee Hays (1850–1852)
- Thomas P. Johnson (1852–1853)
- William H. Gorham (1853–1854)
- David S. Scannell (1855–1856)
- Charles Doane (1857–1861)
- John S. Ellis (1862–1864)
- Henry L. Davis (1864–1867)
- Patrick J. White (1868–1871)
- James Adams (1872–1873)
- William McKibbin (1874–1875)
- Matthew Nunan (1876–1879)
- Thomas Desmond (1880–1881)
- John Sedgwick (1882)
- Patrick Connolly (1883–1884)
- Peter Hopkins (1885–1886)
- William McMann (1887–1888)
- Charles S. Laumeister (1889–1892)
- John J. McDade (1893–1894)
- Richard I. Whelan (1895–1898)
- Henry Martin (1899)
- John Lackmann (1900–1904)
- Peter J. Curtis (1904–1906)
- Thomas F. O'Neil (1906–1908)
- Lawrence J. Dolan (1908–1910)
- Thomas F. Finn (1910–1912)
- Frederick Eggers (1912–1916)
- Thomas F. Finn (1916–1928)
- William J. Fitzgerald (1928–1935)
- Daniel C. Murphy (1936–1951)
- Daniel Gallagher (1952–1956)
- Matthew Carberry (1956–1972)
- Richard Hongisto (1972–1978)
- Eugene A. Brown (1978–1980)
- Michael Hennessey (1980–2012)
- Ross Mirkarimi (2012)
- Vicki Hennessy (2012)
- Ross Mirkarimi (2012–2016)
- Vicki Hennessy (2016–2020)
- Paul Miyamoto (2020–present)

== County Jails ==
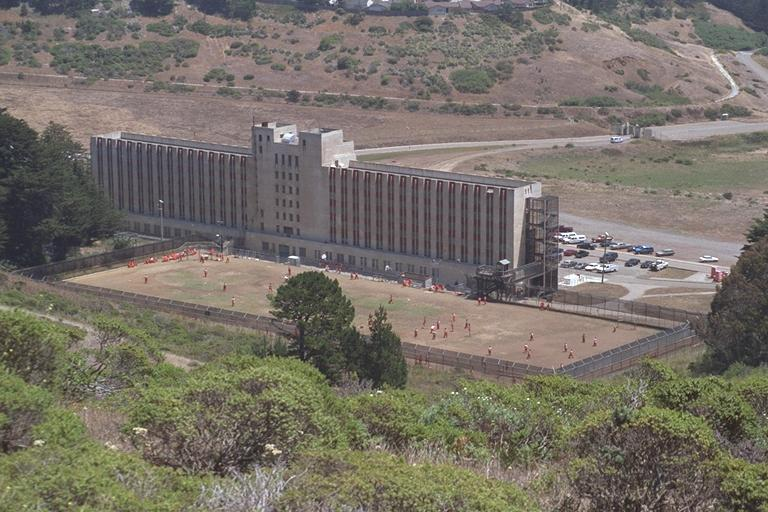
The 1934 San Bruno jail, which served the City and County for over 70 years, until its closure in 2006

The San Francisco Hall of Justice Complex. CJ#3 & #4 on 6th and 7th floors, respectively, and CJ#1 & #2 at 425 7th St., the rounded building to the rear.

San Francisco County operates eight jails, with approximately 55,000 people booked annually. Two of these jails are located in the Hall of Justice on Bryant Street. One of the jails is located in ward 7D/7L in San Francisco General Hospital. Two jails are located at the San Bruno Complex, located ten miles south of San Francisco.

The largest San Francisco jail complex is in an unincorporated part of San Mateo County between Pacifica and San Bruno. The San Bruno complex is home to County Jail 5, a modern direct-supervision facility which was opened in 2006.

The new County Jail 5 replaced the 1934 San Bruno Jail, which had been designated County Jail 3. Before its closure in 2006, the old San Bruno jail was the oldest operating county jail west of the Mississippi River. When opened in 1934, it replaced the outdated Ingleside jails, which dated from the late 1800s, and were located on the site of today's City College of San Francisco. West of County Jail 5 is County Jail 6, which opened in 1989.

The 1934 San Bruno jail closed in 2006 after the new jail opened. Demolition began in 2012.

Prior to the new facility opening, the most modern San Francisco Jail was the one located near the Hall of Justice on Seventh Street. Opened in 1994, the complex is actually two jails. This main complex jail is a "direct supervision facility [that] has become a national model for program-oriented prisoner rehabilitation." The second, which acts as the main intake and release facility for the city, was praised by architecture critic Allan Temko as "a stunning victory for architectural freedom over bureaucratic stupidity." While in custody, prisoners are afforded the opportunity to attend various classes that can earn credit towards a high school diploma.

=== Intake & Release ===
- County Jail #1 (425 7th Street, near Hall of Justice, San Francisco)

=== Classification ===
- County Jail #2 (425 7th Street, San Francisco)

=== Housing ===
- County Jail #2 (425 7th Street, San Francisco)
- County Jail #3 (1 Moreland Drive, San Bruno)
  - New state-of-the-art facility opened in 2006
  - Formerly Jail #5
- County Jail #7 (Ward 7D/7L of San Francisco General Hospital)

== See also ==
- List of law enforcement agencies in California
- Jails of San Francisco, California
- Sheriffs in the United States
- San Francisco Police Department
