= San Francisco General Hospital =

Hospital in California, United States

- San Francisco Department of Public Health

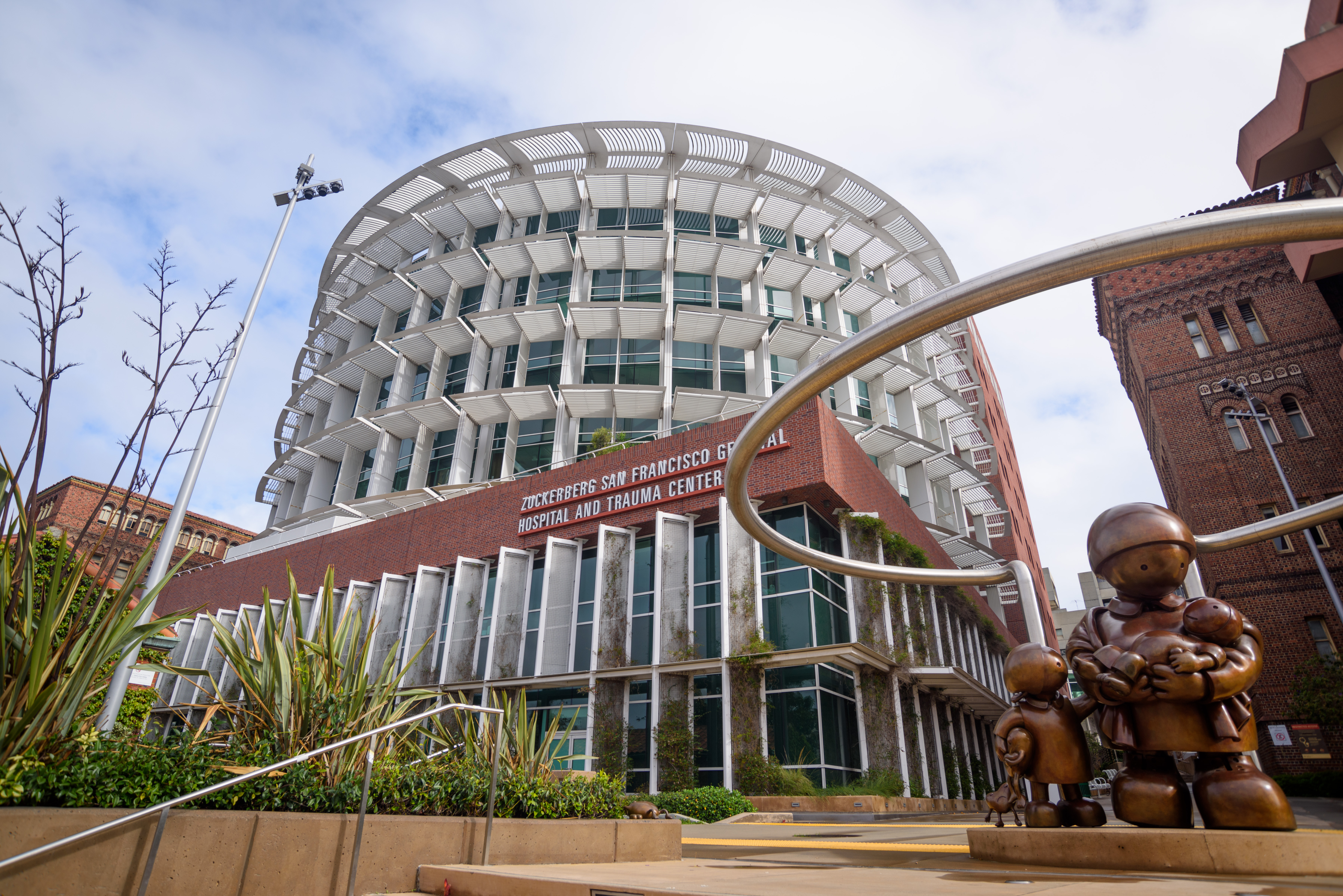
- The main building of the San Francisco General Hospital. At right is the sculpture Mother with Children with Hearts by Tom Otterness

Geography
- Location: 1001 Potrero Ave; San Francisco, California 94110, United States
- Coordinates: 37°45′20″N 122°24′18″W

Organization
- Care system: Medicaid, Medicare, Public
- Type: Teaching
- Affiliated university: University of California, San Francisco

Services
- Emergency department: Level I trauma center
- Beds: 403 General Acute Care; 22 Acute Psychiatric; 59 Skilled Nursing Mental Health; 30 Skilled Nursing Med/Surg

History
- Founded: 1850

Links
- Website: sfgh.org
- Lists: Hospitals in the United States

San Francisco General Hospital (officially known as the Zuckerberg San Francisco General Hospital and Trauma Center) is a public hospital in San Francisco, California, operated by the San Francisco Department of Public Health. It serves as the only Level I trauma center for the 1.5 million residents of San Francisco and northern San Mateo County.

It is the largest acute inpatient and rehabilitation hospital for psychiatric patients in the city. Additionally, it is the only acute hospital in San Francisco that provides 24-hour psychiatric emergency services.

In addition to the approximately 3,500 San Francisco municipal employees, the University of California, San Francisco (UCSF) provides approximately 1,500 employees (including physicians, nurses and ancillary personnel), and the SFGH serves as one of the teaching hospitals for the UCSF School of Medicine. The hospital, especially its Ward 86, was instrumental in treating and identifying early cases of AIDS. A new San Francisco General Hospital acute care building was completed in 2016 for a total approximate cost of $1.02 billion.

The hospital is a safety net hospital additionally serving poor, elderly people, uninsured working families, and immigrants. As of 2014, 92 percent of the patient population at SFGH either receives publicly funded health insurance (Medicare or Medi-Cal) or is uninsured. SFGH is rare in that its emergency rooms do not have agreements in place with private health care insurance providers. Until 2019, privately insured patients were often billed the balance of their care, which could be sizable. This practice was changed after media attention regarding the hospital's billing practices.

== History ==
In 1850, a California state bill appropriated $50,000 to build a State Marine Hospital in San Francisco.

In 1851, the United States Congress established the U.S. Marine Hospital, San Francisco at Rincon Point and relocated to the Presidio of San Francisco in 1875.

In 1855, the State Marine Hospital building was transitioned to the City and County Hospital of San Francisco, funded by every vessel that entered the port, paying inspection fees, to a public health officer.

By 1857, the City and County Hospital had located to the former North Beach School, at the southwest corner of Francisco and Stockton Streets. San Francisco opened its first permanent hospital in 1857.

In 1872, the-then City Hall housed the police prison, which included an infirmary, located in its basement. In 1877, the city changed the prison infirmary to a Receiving Hospital and charged the Department of Public Health.

A hospital has been at Potrero Avenue since 1872, when the city of San Francisco built a 400-bed hospital on Potrero, an all wood hospital.

The emergency hospital of the 1894 Midwinter Exposition was established in connection with a police station in Golden Gate Park.

Expansions to the Potrero Avenue site have been made in 1909 (Mission Emergency Hospital), 1915 (four main, distanced, ward buildings), 1924 (psychiatric ward), 1976 (Acute Care Hospital), and 2016.

By 1904, four emergency hospitals were built: Central, Harbor (Mission Street and East Street), Park and Potrero. In the 1930s, Alemany Emergency Hospital (at 35 Onondaga), Harbor Emergency Hospital (at Sacramento and Drumm Streets), Central Emergency (at the Department of Public Health Building on Grove Street), Park Emergency Aid Station (at Stanyan Street near Beulah Street, built in 1902), and Mission Emergency Hospital (at Potrero Avenue) were extant. In 1969, a new Harbor Emergency Hospital was built on top of the brand-new Broadway Tunnel.

In 1966, SFGH was designated as the city's trauma center, the second trauma center established in the United States after Cook County Hospital.

In 1977, a new inpatient facility consisting of clinic space, rooms for patients, a new born unit, and surgery facilities was established.

In February 2015, a US$75 million donation by Facebook founder Mark Zuckerberg and his wife Priscilla Chan covered approximately 7.35% of the overall cost. In recognition, the hospital was renamed after the couple.

SFGH provided $74,620,877 of services with unrecovered payments in year ending 2020-06-30.

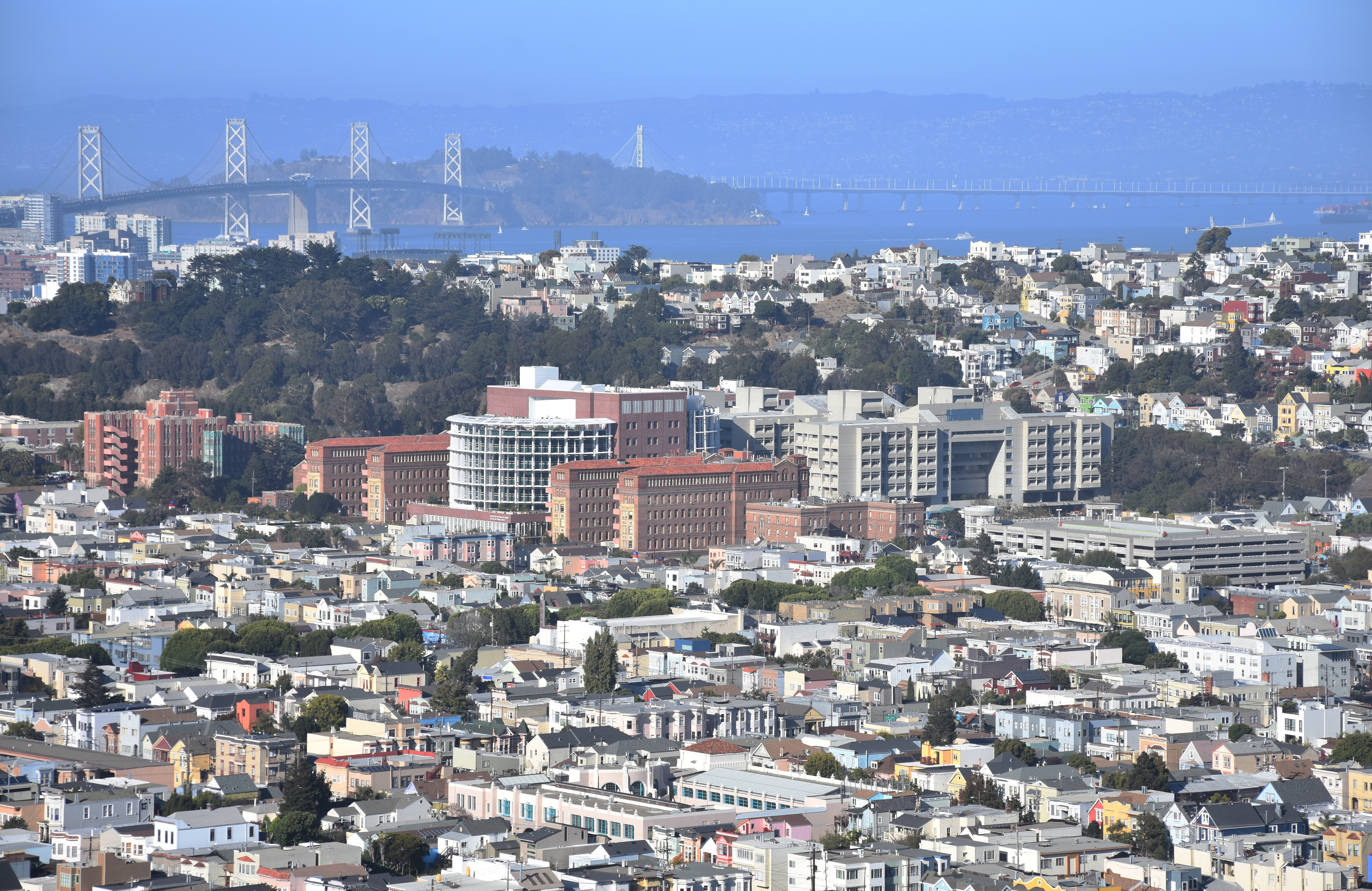
San Francisco General Hospital (seen against the backdrop of Potrero Hill and the Bay Bridge, and parts of the Mission District in the foreground)

== Chan Zuckerberg building ==
In November 2008, San Francisco voters approved an $887.4 million general obligation bond for the General Hospital rebuild, work began in 2009, and was expected to be finished in 2015.

In 2015, Facebook founder and CEO, Mark Zuckerberg, and his wife Priscilla Chan gave $75 million to help fund equipment and technology for the new hospital. In 2016, the new hospital building was completed. It is the first hospital building in San Francisco to be constructed with a base-isolated foundation, 30 inches in any direction for protection against earthquakes. Publicised improvements included expanding the Emergency Department from 27 to 58 beds, and Operating Rooms from 10 to 13. The number of general admission beds, the number of intensive care unit (ICU) beds increased. The previously separate surgical and medical units were combined into one ICU.

== Billing practices ==
Through early 2019, SFGH did not participate in any private health insurance networks and practiced balance billing. A Vox analysis (derived from a database of more than a thousand emergency room bills) characterized the hospital's billing practices as "aggressive" and "surprising": one privately insured patient arriving at the hospital after a bicycle accident was billed more than $20,000 for diagnostic scans and treatment for a broken arm; the bill was 12 times the Medicare billing rate. After media attention, SFGH changed its billing policy so that privately insured patients would be billed at rates consistent with their insurers' network rates, with an income-based maximum.

== Artwork ==
The hospital owns and displays two paintings by Frida Kahlo and Diego Rivera, donated to the hospital by Dr. Leo Eloesser. Eloesser interned at SFGH and was Kahlo's physician.

== Notable deaths ==
- Diane Whipple, American lacrosse player and coach, dog mauling victim.
- Kate Steinle, died from gunshot wounds.
- Ed Lee, attorney, politician and mayor of San Francisco, died from coronary artery disease, with hypertensive heart disease.
- Jack Palladino, investigator and attorney, died from a head injury.

== See also ==
- List of hospitals in California
- R. Beverly Cole
