= George Koob =

American academic

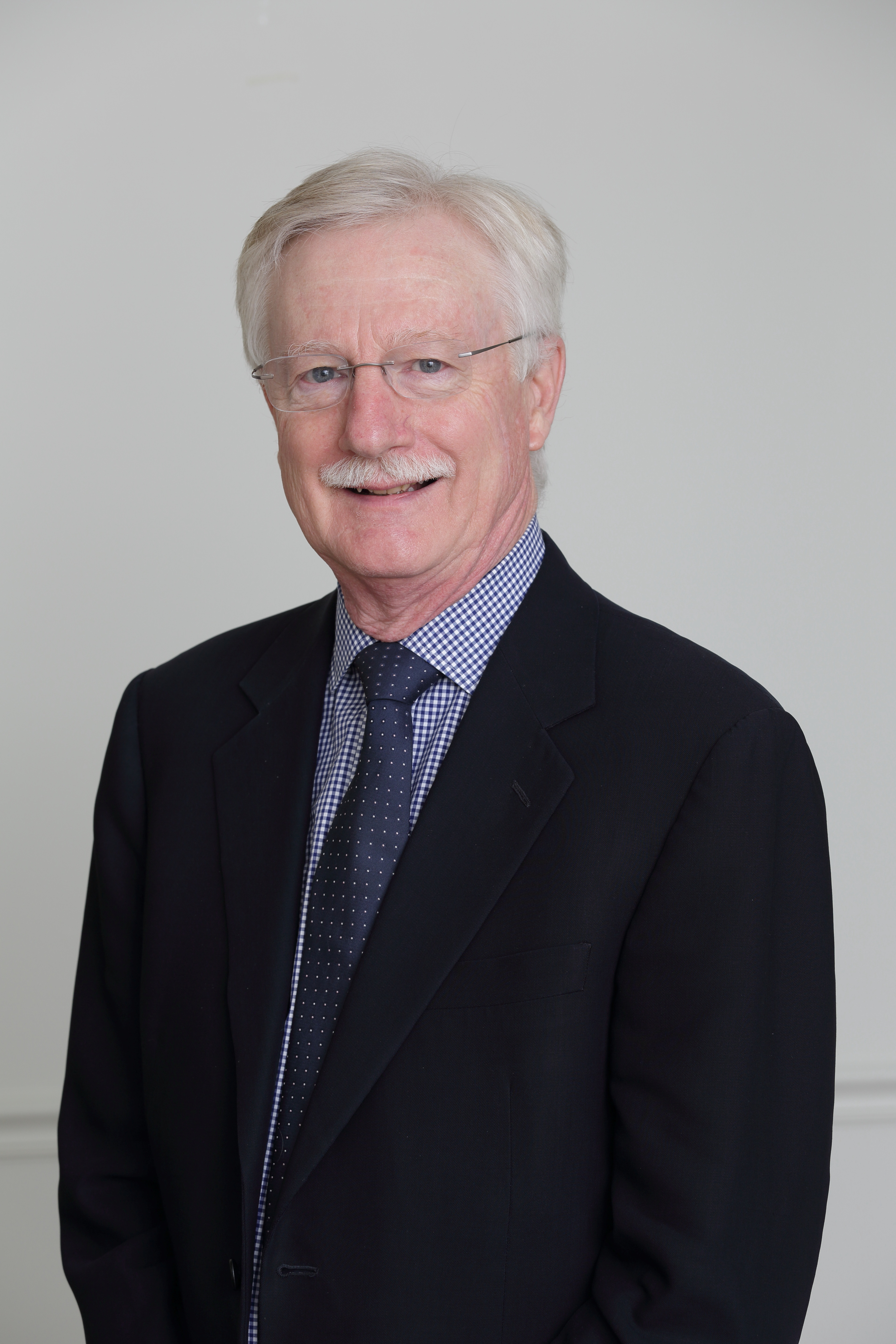
- Born: 1947 (age 78–79)
- Education: Pennsylvania State University (BS); Johns Hopkins University (MS, PhD)
- Occupation: Director of the National Institute on Alcohol Abuse and Alcoholism
- Awards: Legion of Honour
- Scientific career
- Fields: Neurobiology of drug addiction
- Workplaces: National Institute on Alcohol Abuse and Alcoholism; The Scripps Research Institute

George F. Koob (born 1947) is a professor and former chair of the Committee on the Neurobiology of Addictive Disorders at the Scripps Research Institute and adjunct professor of Psychology, Psychiatry, and Skaggs School of Pharmacy and Pharmaceutical Sciences at the University of California, San Diego. In 2014 he became the director of the National Institute on Alcohol Abuse and Alcoholism and continues to hold that position.

== Biography ==
Koob holds a B.S. in Zoology from Pennsylvania State University (1969) and a Ph.D. in Behavioral Physiology from the Johns Hopkins Bloomberg School of Public Health (1972). Subsequently he was a post-doctoral fellow at the University of Cambridge in the Department of Experimental Psychology and the MRC Neuropharmacology Unit.

An authority on addiction and stress, Koob has published over 750 scientific papers and has received continuous funding for his research from the National Institutes of Health, including the National Institute on Alcohol Abuse and Alcoholism (NIAAA) and the National Institute on Drug Abuse (NIDA). He was, until 2014, the director of the NIAAA Alcohol Research Center at the Scripps Research Institute, Consortium Coordinator for NIAAA's multi-center Integrative Neuroscience Initiative on Alcoholism, and co-director of the Pearson Center for Alcoholism and Addiction Research. He has trained 10 predoctoral and 64 postdoctoral fellows. Koob is the former editor-in-chief for the journal Pharmacology Biochemistry and Behavior and for the Journal of Addiction Medicine. He won the Daniel Efron Award for excellence in research from the American College of Neuropsychopharmacology, was honored as a highly cited researcher from the Institute for Scientific Information, was presented with the Distinguished Investigator Award from the Research Society on Alcoholism, and won the Mark Keller Award from NIAAA. He published a landmark book in 2006 with his colleague Michel Le Moal entitled: Neurobiology of Addiction (Academic Press-Elsevier, Amsterdam).

His research interests continue to be directed at the neurobiology of emotion, with a focus on the theoretical constructs of reward and stress with a specific interest in understanding the neuroanatomical connections comprising the emotional systems and neurochemistry of emotional function. Much of his work has been focused on the role of the extended amygdala (medial shell portion of the nucleus accumbens, bed nucleus of the stria terminalis, and central nucleus of the amygdala) in behavioral responses to stress, the neuroadaptations associated with drug dependence, and compulsive drug self-administration.

Koob's work on the neurobiology of stress has included the characterization of behavioral functions in the central nervous system for catecholamines, opioid peptides, and corticotropin-releasing factor. Corticotropin-releasing factor, in addition to its classical hormonal functions in the hypothalamic-pituitary-adrenal axis, is also located in extrahypothalamic brain structures and may play an important role in brain emotional function. Recent use of specific corticotropin-releasing factor receptor antagonists suggests that endogenous brain corticotropin-releasing factor may be involved in specific behavioral responses to stress, the psychopathology of anxiety and affective disorders, and drug addiction. He has also characterized functional roles for other stress-related neurotransmitters/neuroregulators, such as norepinephrine, vasopressin, hypocretin (orexin), neuropeptide Y, and neuroactive steroids.

In the domain of drug addiction, Koob's past work contributed significantly to our understanding of the neurocircuitry associated with the acute reinforcing effects of drugs of abuse. More recently, the focus has been on the neuroadaptations of these reward circuits and the recruitment of the brain stress systems during the transition to dependence. To this end, he has validated key animal models for dependence associated with drugs of abuse and has begun to explore a key role of anti-reward systems in the development of dependence. The neurotransmitter systems in the extended amygdala under current investigation include corticotropin-releasing factor, norepinephrine, dynorphin, orexin, neuropeptide Y, and the sigma receptor system.

Koob's contributions include scholarly treatises on the conceptual framework and theoretical bases for understanding the neurobiology of drug addiction. He has contributed key reviews on the “dark side of addiction” in very prominent journals in the field, including Annual Review of Psychology, Nature, Neuron, and Neuropsychopharmacology, and Nature Reviews Drug Discovery. He also, with colleagues, coined the term Hyperkatifeia which is used to describe the hypersensitivity to emotional distress in the context of opioid abuse.

=== Cancelled NIAAA Study ===
After reports broke that members of NIAAA staff had approached the alcohol industry for the purpose of funding a study into moderate drinking, an investigation was conducted that identified the conduct occurred prior to Koob's tenure. Koob expressed disapproval at the ethically-compromised study, and canceled it in June 2018, while the investigation exonerated him of wrongdoing.

== Professional training and positions ==
2014–present	Director, National Institute on Alcohol Abuse and Alcoholism
2006–2014	Professor and Chair, Committee on the Neurobiology of Addictive Disorders, The Scripps Research Institute.
1999–2003	Medical Advisory Counsel, ABMRF/The Foundation for Alcohol Research.
1995–Present	Director, Alcohol Research Center, The Scripps Research Institute.
1990-2006	Professor, Molecular and Integrative Neurosciences Department (formerly the Department of Neuropharmacology), The Scripps Research Institute.
1983-1989	Associate Member (with tenure), Division of Preclinical Neuroscience and Endocrinology, The Scripps Research Institute.
1983-1989	Associate Member (with tenure), Division of Preclinical Neuroscience and Endocrinology, The Scripps Research Institute.
1977-1983	Staff Scientist, Arthur Vining Davis Center for Behavioral Neurobiology, The Salk Institute for Biological Studies.
1975-1977	Postdoctoral Fellow with Susan D. Iversen, University of Cambridge, Department of Experimental Psychology, Medical Research Council, Neurochemical Pharmacology Unit. Studies in: catecholamines and behavior.
1972-1975	Staff Scientist, Department of Neurophysiology, Walter Reed Army Institute of Research. Studies in: brain lesions, brain stimulation, behavior, neurochemistry, psychopharmacology.
1969-1972	Predoctoral Fellow, Johns Hopkins University, Department of Environmental Medicine. Training in: physiology, behavior, neurochemistry, environmental physiology.
1965-1969	Undergraduate, Pennsylvania State University, Training in: zoology and psychology.

University Affiliation:

2006–present	Adjunct Professor, Skaggs School of Pharmacy and Pharmaceutical Sciences, University of California, San Diego.
1989–present	Adjunct Professor, Departments of Psychology and Psychiatry, University of California, San Diego.
1983-1989	Associate Adjunct Professor, Department of Psychology, University of California, San Diego.
1987-1989	Associate Adjunct Professor, Department of Psychiatry, University of California, San Diego.
1980-1983	Assistant Adjunct Professor, Department of Psychology, University of California, San Diego.

Journal Editor:

- Pharmacology Biochemistry and Behavior (Editor-in-Chief, 1994–present)
- Journal of Addiction Medicine (Senior Editor, 2007–present)
- Brain Research (Section Editor, 2008–present; Special Issue Guest Editor, Biomedical Alcohol Research, 2009, vol. 1305S)

Awards:

- Phi Sigma Society
- Alpha Zeta Fraternity
- Outstanding Faculty Teaching Award, Revelle College, University of California, San Diego (1988)
- Outstanding Faculty Teaching Award, Muir College, University of California, San Diego (1989)
- Outstanding Faculty Teaching Award, Warren College, University of California, San Diego (1992, 1993, 1995)
- Daniel H. Efron Award, Excellence in Research in Neuropsychopharmacology, American College of Neuropsychopharmacology (1991)
- Highly Cited Researcher, Institute for Scientific Information (2001)
- Distinguished Investigator Award, Research Society on Alcoholism (2002)
- ASAM Annual Award, American Society of Addiction Medicine (2002)
- Tharp Award, James H. Tharp Trust Committee, Research Society on Alcoholism (2002)
- Most Valuable Professor, Muir College, University of California, San Diego (2004)
- Mark Keller Award, National Institute on Alcohol Abuse and Alcoholism (2004)
- Faculty Excellence Award, Skaggs School of Pharmacy and Pharmaceutical Sciences, University of California, San Diego (2006)
- Honorary Doctorate of Science, Pennsylvania State University (2009)
- Outstanding UCSD Professor Award, Panhellenic Council, University of California, San Diego (2010)
- Honorary Doctorate of Science, University of Bordeaux (2013)
- Chevalier, Legion of Honour (France) (2016)

Lectureships:

- Commencement Speaker, Warren College, University of California, San Diego (1993)
- Boots Distinguished Neuroscientist, Louisiana State University Medical Center (1989)
- Grass Foundation Lecturer, Society for Neuroscience, Indianapolis Chapter (1990)
- Grass Foundation Lecturer, Society for Neuroscience, Central New York Chapter (1990)
- Grass Foundation Lecturer, Society for Neuroscience, South Carolina Chapter (1992)
- Grass Foundation Lecturer, Society for Neuroscience, West Virginia Chapter (1993)
- Grass Foundation Lecturer, Society for Neuroscience, Northern Rocky Mountain Chapter (1994)
- John C. Forbes Honors Lectureship, School of Basic Health Sciences, Virginia Commonwealth University (1991)
- Wendy and Stanley Marsh Endowed Lectureship, Texas Tech University Health Sciences Center, Amarillo (1999)
- Bowles Lectureship, Center for Alcohol Studies, University of North Carolina (2000)
- Jellinek Lectureship, Substance Abuse Treatment Unit, Yale University School of Medicine (2000)
- Mark Nickerson Memorial Lecture Award, Department of Pharmacology and Therapeutics, McGill University, Montreal, Canada (2006)
- Paul Stark Lecture, Department of Pharmacology and Physiology, University of Rochester Medical Center (2008)
- Louis S. Harris Sterling Drug Visiting Professor, Virginia Commonwealth University (2009).
- Lyon-Voorhees Lectureship, University of Colorado Denver (2010).
- Norman E. Zinberg Memorial Lecture, Department of Psychiatry, Division on Addictions, Cambridge Health Alliance, Harvard Medical School (2010).
