= Addiction medicine =

Medical specialty that deals with the treatment of addiction

Addiction Medicine Physician
Occupation
- Names: Addictionist/Addictionologist, Physician
- Occupation type: Specialty
- Activity sectors: Medicine

Description
- Education required: Doctor of Medicine (M.D.); Doctor of Osteopathic medicine (D.O.); Bachelor of Medicine, Bachelor of Surgery (M.B.B.S.); Bachelor of Medicine, Bachelor of Surgery (MBChB)
- Fields of employment: Hospitals, Clinics

Addiction medicine is a medical subspecialty that deals with the diagnosis, prevention, evaluation, treatment, and recovery of persons with addiction, of those with substance-related and addictive disorders, and of people who show unhealthy use of substances including alcohol, nicotine, prescription medicine and other illicit and licit drugs. The medical subspecialty often crosses over into other areas, since various aspects of addiction fall within the fields of public health, psychology, social work, mental health counseling, psychiatry, and internal medicine, among others. Incorporated within the specialty are the processes of detoxification, rehabilitation, harm reduction, abstinence-based treatment, individual and group therapies, oversight of halfway houses, treatment of withdrawal-related symptoms, acute intervention, and long-term therapies designed to reduce likelihood of relapse. Some specialists, primarily those who also have expertise in family medicine or internal medicine, also provide treatment for disease states commonly associated with substance use, such as hepatitis and HIV infection.

Physicians specializing in the field are in general agreement concerning applicability of treatment to those with addiction to drugs, such as alcohol and heroin, and often also to gambling, which has similar characteristics and has been well-described in the scientific literature. There is less agreement concerning definition or treatment of other so-called addictive behaviors such as sexual addiction and internet addiction, such behaviors not being marked generally by physiologic tolerance or withdrawal.

Over centuries, addiction has been recognized as an issue to be treated, and has been addressed with the creation of a multitude of organizations, the passage of certain acts, and the development of various drugs in the medical field all to help those who struggle with addiction.

Doctors focusing on addiction medicine are medical specialists who focus on addictive disease and have had special study and training focusing on the prevention and treatment of such diseases. There are two routes to specialization in the addiction field: one via a psychiatric pathway and one via other fields of medicine. The American Society of Addiction Medicine notes that approximately 40% of its members are psychiatrists (MD/DO) while the remainder have received primary medical training in other fields.

== History of Addiction Medicine ==
=== 1750s–early 1800s ===
Addiction first became well known and seen as a major issue between the 1750s and early 1800s with alcoholism running rampant and being the main contributor to this. Dr. Benjamin Rush first began to discern alcoholism as an illness to be addressed when he published his writing “Inquiry into the Effects of Ardent Spirits on the Human Mind and Body” in 1784. Because of his writing on alcoholism, the beginnings of the temperance movement came shortly after in the early 1800s.

=== 1800s ===
The first inebriate homes for alcoholics opened around the 1850s. These homes and asylums provided a segregated place for alcoholics to stay while they withdrew from the alcohol, along with integration into sobriety groups. In 1864, Dr. Joseph Edward Turner opened the New York State Inebriate Asylum, which was the first rehabilitation center for alcoholism. In the late 1800s, around 1890, alcoholics were sent to hospital wards and drunk tanks as inebriate homes began shutting down.

=== 1900–1950 ===
Throughout the first half of the 1900s, many hospitals and organizations opened to assist addicts, such as the Charles B. Towns substance abuse Hospital (1901), the Emmanuel Clinic/the Emmanuel movement (1906), morphine maintenance clinics (1919–1924), narcotics farms (1935), Alcoholics Anonymous (1935), etc. In addition to this, certain state laws were passed to try to sterilize disabled people, addicts, and people with mental disorders (1910). During this time, various drugs also came out to attempt to cure alcoholism like barbiturates, amphetamines, LSD, and disulfiram (1948–1950).

=== 1950–2000 ===
Within these years, multiple advancements were made, certain laws or acts were passed, and more organizations came about to help people with addiction. In 1957, treatment units for alcoholics were developed by the Veterans Administration. Shortly thereafter, a multitude of associations opened. These include but are not limited to the Halfway House Association (1958), the Betty Ford Clinic (1982), Cocaine Anonymous (1982), Secular Organizations for Sobriety and Rational Recovery (1985–1986), and SMART Recovery (1994). Along with that, drugs like methadone (1964), Narcan (1971), and naltrexone (1994) were developed to fight against opioid withdrawal and alcoholism. As for the legal side of things, the Controlled Substances Act passed in 1970, which classified all controlled substances into five classes, and the Drug Addiction Treatment Act passed in 1999, enforcing a stricter version of the Controlled Substances Act.

=== 2000–present day ===
In the past 25 years, further developments have been made in the field of addiction medicine such as the FDA approval of a treatment called buprenorphine for opioid use disorder, along with The Mental Health Parity and Addiction Equity Act (2008) and the Affordable Care Act (2010) being passed. The MHPAEA of 2008 made it mandatory for insurance organizations to give people coverage for the cost of substance-abuse-related treatments, while the ACA of 2010 further expanded the coverage offered for substance-abuse-related treatments through state health insurances.

== Accreditation ==
In several countries around the world, specialist bodies have been set up to ensure high quality practice in addiction medicine.

=== United States ===
In October 2015, the American Board of Medical Specialties (ABMS) officially recognized addiction medicine as a subspecialty. Within the United States, there are two accepted specialty examinations. One is a Board Certification in Addiction Psychiatry from the American Board of Psychiatry and Neurology. The other is a Board Certification in Addiction Medicine from the American Board of Preventive Medicine. The latter approach is available to all physicians with primary Board certification, while the former is available only to board-certified psychiatrists.

=== Australia and New Zealand ===
Within Australia, addiction medicine specialists are certified via the Chapter of Addiction Medicine, which is part of the Royal Australasian College of Physicians. They may alternatively be a member of the Section of Addiction Psychiatry, Royal Australian & New Zealand College of Psychiatrists.

=== Accreditation internationally ===
The International Society of Addiction Medicine also can provide certification of expertise.

== Medical societies ==
- American Society of Addiction Medicine (ASAM)
- American Academy of Addiction Psychiatry (AAAP)

== Medical journals ==
- Journal of Addiction Medicine (JAM)
- Journal of Addictions Nursing
- JAMA Neurology

== See also ==
- Addiction psychiatry
- American Academy of Addiction Psychiatry
- American Society of Addiction Medicine
- Narcology
