= Etoh =

Etoh may refer to:

- EtOH, shorthand often used for ethanol (e.g., EtOH withdrawal)
  - The ETOH database, an Alcohol and Alcohol Problems Science database, produced by the NIAAA (National Institute on Alcohol Abuse and Alcoholism)
- "Etoh", a song by The Avalanches from their 2001 album Since I Left You
