= Government of New York =

Government of New York may refer to:

- Government of New York (state)
- Government of New York City
