= The American Journal on Addictions =

- Discipline: Addiction medicine
- Language: English
- Edited by: Thomas R. Kosten

Publication details
- History: 1992-present
- Publisher: John Wiley & Sons on behalf of the American Academy of Addiction Psychiatry
- Frequency: Bimonthly
- Impact factor: 3.076 (2020)

Standard abbreviations
- ISO 4: Am. J. Addict.

Indexing
- CODEN: AJADEA
- ISSN: 1055-0496 (print); 1521-0391 (web)
- LCCN: 2008219020
- OCLC no.: 225097764

Links
- Journal homepage; Online access; Online archive

The American Journal on Addictions is a bimonthly peer-reviewed medical journal covering addiction medicine. It was established in 1992 and is published by John Wiley & Sons on behalf of the American Academy of Addiction Psychiatry, of which it is the official journal. The editor-in-chief is Thomas R. Kosten (Baylor College of Medicine). According to the Journal Citation Reports, the journal has a 2020 impact factor of 3.076, ranking it 17th out of 37 journals in the category "Substance Abuse".
