= Department of Health and Mental Hygiene =

A Department of Health and Mental Hygiene is an agency in some governments:

- Maryland Department of Health and Mental Hygiene, the former name of the Maryland Department of Health from 1969 to 2017
- New York City Department of Health and Mental Hygiene
- New York State Department of Mental Hygiene (disambiguation)
