= Kamil Kalina =

Czech psychiatrist

Kamil Kalina (born 5 July 1945 in Prague) is a Czech psychiatrist, university professor at the Faculty of Medicine at Charles University, a psychologist "addictologist", and politician of the Civic Democratic Party (ODS), and after the Velvet Revolution, was elected a Deputy chairman of the ODS and Member of the Federal Assembly for the Electoral District of Prague in 1992. In 1991 he co-founded the Foundation Filia which specializes in addictology. Since February 2007 he has worked as a National Drug Coordinator of the Office of Government. He has authored or co-authored numerous books and papers, amongst them are Czech Health Care System: Delivery & Finance (1998), Terapeutická komunita: obecný model a jeho aplikace v léčbě závislostí (2008) and Základy klinické adiktologie (2008).
