= NY Gov. =

NY Gov. may refer to:

- Government of New York (state)
- Governor of New York
