= Journal of Addiction Medicine =

- Discipline: Addiction medicine
- Language: English
- Edited by: Richard Saitz

Publication details
- History: 2007-present
- Publisher: Lippincott Williams & Wilkins on behalf of the American Society of Addiction Medicine
- Frequency: Bimonthly
- Impact factor: 2.406 (2017)

Standard abbreviations
- ISO 4: J. Addict. Med.

Indexing
- CODEN: JAMOCZ
- ISSN: 1932-0620 (print); 1935-3227 (web)
- LCCN: 2006214656
- OCLC no.: 69420533

Links
- Journal homepage; Online access; Online archive

The Journal of Addiction Medicine is a bimonthly peer-reviewed medical journal covering addiction medicine. It was established in 2007 and is published by Lippincott Williams & Wilkins on behalf of the American Society of Addiction Medicine, of which it is the official journal. The editor-in-chief is Richard Saitz (Boston University), who assumed this position on January 1, 2015. The previous editor-in-chief was George Koob. According to the Journal Citation Reports, the journal has a 2017 impact factor of 2.406.
