= Ernest Noble =

Alcoholism researcher (died 2017)

Ernest Pascal Noble (died October 17, 2017) was Pike Professor of Alcohol Studies, University of California, Los Angeles. He also served as the director of the National Institute on Alcohol Abuse and Alcoholism from 1976 to 1978.

With Sujata Tewari he demonstrated that chronic alcohol consumption inhibits protein metabolism in the brains of mice.

He was awarded a Guggenheim fellowship in 1974.
