= New York State Department of Mental Hygiene =

Department of the New York state government

The New York State Department of Mental Hygiene is a pro forma department of the New York state government that comprises several autonomous agencies:

- the Office of Addiction Services and Supports (OASAS)
- the Office of Mental Health (OMH)
- the Office for People With Developmental Disabilities (OPWDD)
