= New York State Office for People With Developmental Disabilities =

State agency in New York, United States

State agency overview
- Jurisdiction: New York State government
- Headquarters: 44 Holland Avenue, Albany, New York
- State agency executive: Willow Baer, Commissioner
- Parent department: New York State Department of Mental Hygiene
- Website: opwdd.ny.gov

The New York State Office for People With Developmental Disabilities (OPWDD) is an executive agency in the state of New York, whose mission is to provide services and conduct research for those with intellectual disabilities and developmental disabilities (I/DD). It is one of New York State's largest agencies, with a mandate to provide services and supports to more than 130,000 people with intellectual or developmental disabilities and leads a workforce of more than 22,000 direct support staff, clinicians, nurses, researchers and other professionals throughout the state. It operates 13 Developmental Disabilities Services Offices which operate group homes for the individuals with intellectual and developmental disabilities in its care. It is part of the pro forma Department of Mental Hygiene along with the Office of Mental Health (OMH) and Office of Addiction Services and Supports (OASAS).

The agency is based in Albany, New York at 44 Holland Avenue.

== History ==
The agency was established in response to the 1972 Willowbrook State School exposé, lawsuit, and subsequent Consent Decree of 1975.

The Department of Mental Hygiene was established in 1926–1927 as part of a restructuring of the state government, and was given responsibility for people diagnosed with intellectual disability, mental illness or epilepsy. In 1966–1967, the Community Hostel Facilities Act authorized the creation of community residential facilities or group homes. In 1977–1978, the Department of Mental Hygiene was reorganized into the autonomous Office of Mental Health, Office of Alcoholism and Substance Abuse, and the Office of Mental Retardation and Developmental Disabilities (OMRDD). In July 2010, the agency was renamed from the OMRDD to its current name. The Institute for Basic Research in Developmental Disabilities was established in 1958 for basic and clinical research into the causes and treatment of intellectual disabilities.

== Structure ==
OPWDD maintains five Developmental Disability Regional Offices that are responsible for coordinating and overseeing not-for-profit provider services, and managing the enrollment process.

Region	Area
1	Western New York & Finger Lakes
2	Central New York, Broome & Sunmount
3	Capital District, Taconic & Hudson Valley
4	Metro, Brooklyn, Staten Island & Queens
5	Long Island

== Eligibility ==
Eligibility to receive OPWDD services is determined based on review of an application and other supporting information. Developmental disabilities that may qualify an individual for OPWDD include intellectual disability, autism spectrum disorder, cerebral palsy, epilepsy, familial dysautonomia, Prader–Willi syndrome, and neurological impairments.

== Demographics ==
OPWDD serves approximately 130,000 New Yorkers with developmental disabilities. 65% of those served are male and 35% female. 59% of the population served are adults aged 21–64, 34% are children under the age of 21, and 7% are seniors aged 65 and over. 66.2% of the population served are white.

The primary two diagnoses of the population served are intellectual disabilities (53%) and autism (27%).

== Services and funding ==
In additional to eligibility, individuals have to demonstrate a need for each service sought. Most OPWDD services are provided through New York State's Medicaid program, which is jointly funded by the federal and state governments. Individuals requiring supports and services beyond 100% NY State funded services must enroll in OPWDD's HCBS 1915(c) Waiver program. As of 2023, OPWDD's annual Medicaid expenditures amount to $9 billion with an average expenditure of $70K per person.

Service	Description	Funding source
Family Support Services (FSS)	To provide support for a family whose loved one with a developmental disability lives at home. May include can include social skills training, crisis support, behavioral support, and family reimbursement.	New York State
Housing Subsidy (formerly ISS)	Help to pay rent for an individual's own home or community-based housing that offers supports to gain independent living skills.	New York State
Community Habilitation and Day Habilitation	To teach an individual skills to live as independently as possible.	HCBS 1915(c) Waiver
Respite	Provides relief to caregivers who have loved ones living at home with them.	HCBS 1915(c) Waiver
Assistive Technology	Assistive devices or modifications to your home or vehicle to support individuals to live at home.	HCBS 1915(c) Waiver
Employment Services	Help individuals obtain the skills necessary to get and keep a job.	HCBS 1915(c) Waiver
Behavioral Supports	Teaching individuals skills to cope with challenging behaviors and emotions.	HCBS 1915(c) Waiver
Clinic Services	To provide some rehabilitative support such as physical therapy, occupational therapy, and speech language pathology or diagnostic and evaluation services.	NY Medicaid State Plan (Non-Waiver) Services

Services may be provided directly by OPWDD or through not-for-profit service provider agencies.

== Public safety ==
This agency employs security officers to maintain order and protect patients, grounds, and building, which grants them very limited peace officer authority when on duty pursuant to New York State Criminal Procedure Law § 2.10(52), including the Mental Hygiene Law (section 7.25), Public Health Law (section 455) .OPWDD officers are prohibited by state law from carrying a firearm.

== List of commissioners ==
Name	Dates in Office	Governors Served	Comments
Thomas Coughlin III	1978 - 1980	Hugh Carey	First commissioner. Appointed Commissioner of the Department of Corrections in 1980.
James E Introne	1980 – 1982	Hugh Carey	
Zymond L. Slezak	1982 – 1983	Hugh Carey	
Arthur Y. Webb	1983 – January 1990	Mario Cuomo	Resigned to become Director of New York State Division of Substance Abuse Services.
Elin M. Howe	February 1990 – September 1993	Mario Cuomo	Appointed as Commissioner of the former Department of Mental Retardation (now Department of Developmental Services) in Massachusetts.
Thomas A. Maul	September 1993 – 2006	Mario Cuomo, George Pataki, Eliot Spitzer	
Diana Jones Ritter	March 2007 – July 2010	Eliot Spitzer, David Paterson	Resigned to become the Managing Director of the New York City Metropolitan Transit Authority.
Max Chmura	July 2010 – March 2011	David Paterson, Andrew Cuomo	Forced resignation.
Laurie A. Kelley	July 2013 – 2014	Andrew Cuomo	Acting. Resigned.
Kerry Delaney	2014 – 2019	Andrew Cuomo	Acting. Resigned.
Dr. Theodore Kastner	2019 – November 2021	Andrew Cuomo	Resigned.
Courtney Burke	April 2011 – July 2013	Andrew Cuomo	Resigned to become New York's new Deputy Secretary for Health.
Kerri E. Neifeld	November 2021 – June 2024	Kathy Hochul	Became acting commissioner in November 2021 and was confirmed as permanent in March 2022. Resigned.
Willow Baer	July 2021 – Present	Kathy Hochul	Acting.
