= New York State Office of Addiction Services and Supports =

Government organization in New York, United States

Agency overview
- Formed: 1992
- Preceding agencies: Division of Alcoholism and Alcohol Abuse; Division of Substance Abuse Services
- Type: State agency
- Jurisdiction: New York state government
- Headquarters: Albany, New York
- Agency executive: Chinazo Cunningham, Commissioner
- Parent department: New York State Department of Mental Hygiene
- Website: oasas.ny.gov

Footnotes
- Formerly the Office of Alcoholism and Substance Abuse Services (1992–2019).

The Office of Addiction Services and Supports (OASAS) is an agency of the New York state government overseeing addiction prevention, treatment, recovery, and harm reduction services across New York. It is part of the pro forma Department of Mental Hygiene along with the Office of Mental Health (OMH) and Office for People With Developmental Disabilities (OPWDD).

It regulates and funds a statewide network of certified providers, operates 12 state-run treatment centers, and serves over 700,000 individuals annually. OASAS sets standards for addiction care, distributes state and federal funding, and coordinates strategic initiatives to address substance use and problem gambling, including programs for underserved populations, harm reduction outreach, and peer-based recovery support.

== Treatment ==
OASAS oversees a comprehensive continuum of treatment programs for substance use and gambling disorders ranging from outpatient services to intensive residential care. OASAS itself directly operates 12 addiction treatment centers (ATCs) staffed by medical and clinical professionals, providing state-run inpatient and residential treatment for approximately 5,000 individuals each year. The vast majority of services, however, are delivered by community-based programs run by nonprofit agencies and hospitals under OASAS oversight. Within the certified treatment system alone, nearly 200,000 individuals receive substance use disorder (SUD) treatment in a given year.

OASAS certifies treatment programs aligned with the American Society of Addiction Medicine (ASAM) criteria. The level of care is determined by crisis/detox needs, risk factors, and resource factors and span:

- Outpatient services (ASAM levels 1–2.5, Part 822): standard clinics, opioid treatment programs (OTP), intensive outpatient services (IOS, IOP), and outpatient day rehabilitation (PHP).
- Residential services (ASAM levels 3.1–3.5, Part 820): stabilization, rehabilitation, and reintegration services, including state-operated ATCs.
- Inpatient services (ASAM levels 3.7–4, Part 816).

== Prevention ==
OASAS supports evidence-based programs in schools and communities targeting underage drinking, drug misuse, and gambling. It funds regional Prevention Resource Centers and community coalitions that deliver education, workshops, and training sessions, and helps coordinate local prevention activities and public awareness campaigns.

== Financing ==
New York explicitly excludes most residential and inpatient services from Medicaid managed care plan coverage because they are typically in institutions for mental disease (IMD) with more than 16 beds. New York could, but does not, because the United States would not pay for most of it. However, plans are required to pay for the first 28 consecutive days of treatment without prior authorization or utilization review if the provider notifies the plan within two business days of admission and submits an initial treatment plan. New York only does so because it gets federal Medicaid funding for this short-term treatment in IMDs by combining its Section 1115 SUD waiver (30 days/stay, 90 days/year) and managed-care "in lieu of" authority (≤15 days/month).

== Workforce development ==
OASAS oversees workforce development in the field: it establishes qualifications and administers professional credentialing for substance abuse counselors and prevention specialists, and provides training to improve the competence of the workforce. Professional credentialing includes Credentialed Alcoholism and Substance Abuse Counselors (CASACs), Credentialed Prevention Professionals (CPPs), Credentialed Prevention Specialists (CPSs), and Credentialed Problem Gambling Counselors (CPGCs). Within the Education Department, the State Board for Mental Health Practitioners licenses the mental health counselors (LMHCs) and the State Board for Social Work licenses the social workers (LMSWs, LCSWs) that are integral to addiction treatment and recovery support.

== Health information ==
The Client Data System (CDS) is the primary statewide information system for administrative and clinical data about individuals receiving treatment services, aligned with SAMHSA's TEDS reporting requirements. The collected data feed into dashboards, research, policy planning, and public information. Access is restricted and subject to federal/state privacy laws and OASAS security rules.

The Statewide Health Information Network for New York (SHIN-NY, pronounced "shiny") is the state health information exchange that allows healthcare providers to access and share patient data, and includes several regional health information organizations such as Hixny. Consent is required to allow a patient's providers to share and access their records.

== History ==
The Department of Narcotic Drug Control was created in 1918. The Department of Mental Hygiene was established in 1926–1927 as part of a restructuring of the state government, and was given responsibility for people diagnosed with mental illness, intellectual disability, or epilepsy. In 1961 a Division of Alcoholism was created by executive order within it. In 1962 the Metcalf–Volker Act provided for the civil commitment of narcotics addicts. By 1966, between Robinson v. California and Powell v. Texas, New York City no longer enforced its public intoxication statutes. By 1967, public intoxication had been reduced to a violation without the possibility to commit to an inebriate colony like the City Farm. In 1966 the Narcotic Addition Control Commission (NACC) was established within the Department of Mental Hygiene to oversee a statewide program for the compulsory treatment, prevention, and research of drug addiction, including court-ordered rehabilitation in state-run facilities and community-based outpatient clinics. In 1973, NACC was renamed the Drug Abuse Control Commission (DACC), expanding its authority to include other dangerous drugs while shifting outpatient supervision to probation departments. In 1975 it was further renamed the Office of Drug Abuse Services. By 1976, public alcohol intoxication was decriminalized and replaced with short-term protective custody in health facilities.

In 1978, the Department of Mental Hygiene was reorganized into the autonomous Office of Mental Health (OMH), Office of Alcoholism and Substance Abuse (OASA), and the Office of Mental Retardation and Developmental Disabilities (OMRDD). In 1989 the Statewide Anti-Drug Abuse Council was created by executive order. In 1992, the Division of Alcoholism and Alcohol Abuse (DAAA) and Division of Substance Abuse Services (DSAS) were merged into the Office of Alcoholism and Substance Abuse Services (OASAS). In 2012, the Justice Center for the Protection of People with Special Needs was established to create uniform safeguards for people with special needs served in residential facilities and day programs by provider agencies that are operated, licensed, or certified by a multitude of state agencies, including the OMH, OASAS, and OPWDD. In 2019, OASAS was renamed the Office of Addiction Services and Supports (OASAS). The Clinical and Research Institute on Addictions was established in affiliation with the University at Buffalo in 1970 for the conduct of biological, psychological, and social research on the etiology, prevention, and treatment of alcoholic disorders.

== List of commissioners ==
- 1990 (1992), Marguerite Saunders (initially as Director of the Division of Alcoholism and Alcohol Abuse)
- 1996, Jean Somers Miller
- 2004, William Gorman
- 2007, Karen Carpenter-Palumbo
- 2011, Arlene González-Sánchez
- 2021, Chinazo Cunningham

== See also ==
- New York State Department of Health
- New York City Department of Health and Mental Hygiene
- US Substance Abuse and Mental Health Services Administration
