= New York City Department of Veterans' Services =

Municipal veterans' affairs agency in New York City

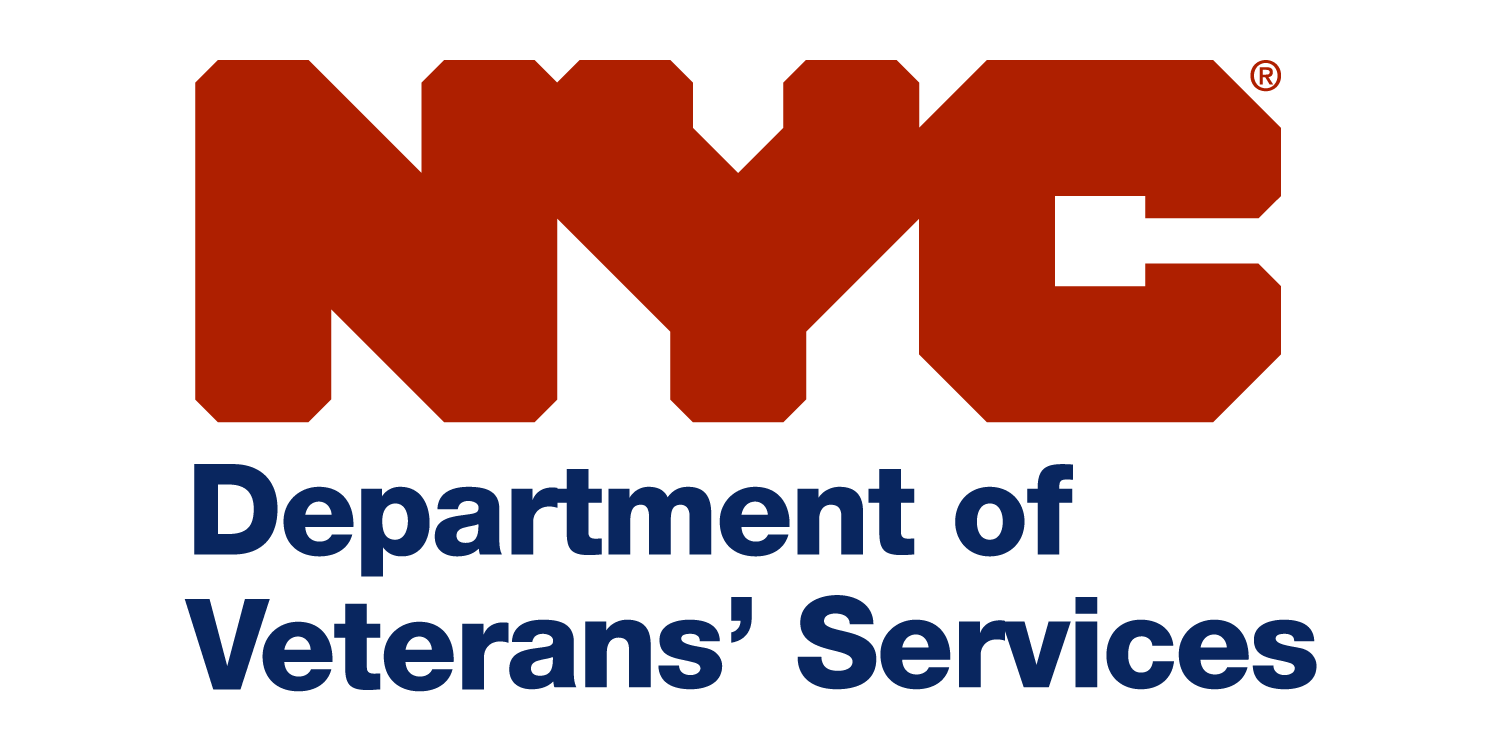

Department overview
- Formed: 2016
- Preceding Department: Mayor's Office of Veterans' Affairs
- Jurisdiction: New York City
- Headquarters: 1 Centre Street, Suite 2208, Manhattan, New York City, New York, U.S.
- Employees: Just under 40 full-time staff
- Annual budget: Approximately US$5 million (FY 2024)
- Department executive: Yesenia Mata, Commissioner
- Website: Official website

The New York City Department of Veterans' Services (DVS) is a municipal agency of New York City responsible for connecting United States military veterans, service members, and their families with housing, health care, benefits, education, and employment services. The department was formally established in 2016, replacing the Mayor's Office of Veterans' Affairs, after the New York City Council passed legislation sponsored by Council Member Eric Ulrich and following sustained advocacy from veterans' organizations such as Iraq and Afghanistan Veterans of America (IAVA).

DVS is one of the city's smallest agencies, with a staff of fewer than 40 and a budget of about US$5 million in the mid-2020s, but it has drawn national attention as one of the first stand-alone municipal departments in the United States dedicated solely to veterans and their families. The founding commissioner was Loree Sutton, a retired U.S. Army brigadier general and psychiatrist; she was succeeded in 2019 by James Hendon, who was reappointed by Mayor Eric Adams in 2022.

== History ==
=== Creation of the department ===
New York City's veterans' affairs functions were historically housed in the Mayor's Office of Veterans' Affairs (MOVA), a small mayoral office that advocates and service organizations criticized as under-resourced. In 2014, Council Member Eric Ulrich, then chair of the City Council's Committee on Veterans, introduced legislation to elevate the office to a full department with its own commissioner and expanded mandate.

On November 10, 2015, the Council announced that it would vote on Introduction 314-A, sponsored by Ulrich, to create the New York City Department of Veterans' Services as a separate agency and to transfer MOVA's duties and staff to the new department. This was a significant expansion of the city's veterans' infrastructure, making New York one of the first major U.S. cities to establish a cabinet-level department for veterans. The bill was signed into law by Mayor Bill de Blasio in December 2015 and took effect in 2016.

Veterans advocacy organizations, including IAVA, supported the change and argued that a stand-alone department with a commissioner would improve coordination with federal and state agencies and give veterans a stronger voice in city government. The New York State Department of Veterans' Services later accredited the city department to assist veterans with federal benefits claims, placing it alongside county and nonprofit partners in the state's veterans' services network.

=== Leadership ===
Retired U.S. Army brigadier general Loree K. Sutton, a psychiatrist and former director of the Defense Centers of Excellence for Psychological Health and Traumatic Brain Injury, was appointed as the founding commissioner of DVS under Mayor de Blasio. Sutton led DVS through its initial build-out, including opening veteran resource centers in multiple boroughs and launching several initiatives, before stepping down in 2019 to pursue a mayoral bid.

In October 2019, de Blasio announced that Sutton would be succeeded by James Hendon, a U.S. Army Reserve officer and former director of the New York University Veterans Future Lab, as commissioner of DVS. Hendon took office at the end of 2019 and was reappointed by Mayor Eric Adams in 2022. He focused on "purpose-driven lives" for veterans and on expanding partnerships with community-based organizations and private employers.

== Organization and mandate ==
DVS is a charter agency within New York City government. Its mandate, as codified in local law, is to inform veterans and their families about available federal, state, and city services; assist them in accessing benefits; and coordinate city policy on housing, health, education, and employment for veterans.

The department's headquarters is located in the David N. Dinkins Municipal Building at 1 Centre Street, and it maintains veteran resource centers in each of the five boroughs. DVS emphasizes a "navigation" model rather than direct provision of most services, referring clients to city agencies, the U.S. Department of Veterans Affairs, state veterans' agencies, and nonprofit partners while providing housing support, benefits navigation, and follow-up.

DVS programs and communications are organized around six "pillars": housing, health and wellness, benefits and claims, education, employment, and community engagement and culture. The agency reports performance indicators such as client contacts, placements into permanent housing, benefits claims filed, and outreach events in the mayor's Management Report.

== Programs and services ==
=== Housing and homelessness ===
New York City has been cited as an example of a "Housing First"-style approach to ending veteran homelessness. An analysis in Gotham Gazette credited DVS and its predecessor efforts with making permanent housing for homeless veterans a top priority, using landlord incentives, peer coordinators and after-care services, and noted that since 2015 the city has maintained veteran homelessness at "functionally zero" by securing permanent housing within 90 days for most veterans entering the shelter system.

DVS operates housing support services that include assessment, housing preparation, documentation support, permanent housing placement, and after-care, as well as eviction prevention and rapid rehousing assistance, often in partnership with the Department of Homeless Services and nonprofit housing providers.

=== Referral and navigation: VetConnectNYC ===
To coordinate referrals among city agencies and community-based organizations, DVS helped launch VetConnectNYC, a centralized, web- and phone-based referral system that connects New York City veterans, service members, and their families with housing, health, legal, and social services. External partners, including colleges and nonprofit organizations, describe VetConnectNYC as the primary intake pathway for city veteran services, with referrals routed to DVS staff and a network of vetted providers.

The New York City Comptroller has found that users cannot log in to the VetConnectNYC portal consistently.

=== Employment tools: VetConnectPro ===
In 2021, Mayor de Blasio and DVS announced the launch of VetConnectPro, an online employment platform designed to connect New York City veterans, military spouses, and members of the Guard and Reserve with job openings, mentoring, and professional networking opportunities. News coverage quoted Commissioner Hendon describing VetConnectPro as a way to "make it easy for veterans to connect with purpose-driven careers" and emphasized the city's partnership with private employers and workforce organizations.

=== Mental health and outreach programs ===
DVS collaborates with New York Cares and the New York Health Foundation (NYHealth) on Mission: VetCheck, a peer-based outreach program that conducts wellness check-in calls, screens for suicide risk, and connects veterans to behavioral health, benefits, and housing resources. NYHealth has described Mission: VetCheck as reaching thousands of veterans and building "a robust referral network" for mental health and social support services.

The department also runs or co-sponsors programs such as Veterans on Campus, which works with colleges and universities to support student veterans; veteran resource centers in each borough; and periodic citywide veterans summits and cultural events.

=== Events and memorial initiatives ===
DVS participates in citywide commemorative events and initiatives related to veterans. In 2024 the department worked with the Department of Cultural Affairs and partner organizations on the design of a "Flames of Honor" memorial honor service members killed in post-9/11 conflicts. In 2025 Commissioner Hendon was quoted in coverage of a planned "Homecoming of Heroes" ticker-tape parade to honor Iraq and Afghanistan veterans, highlighting the thousands of service members killed or injured in those conflicts and the tens of thousands lost to suicide.

== Evaluation and oversight ==
In 2024 the New York City Council's Compliance Division released its first agency report cards, including an in-depth assessment of DVS. The report found that DVS had created multiple support channels and partnerships for veterans but concluded that the department "needs to rebuild trust" with the veteran community and "must do better" at leveraging other city agencies to expand its reach. The department received overall grades of C in pillars such as leadership, service delivery, relationships, and workforce development, and B grades in digital government and measurement and knowledge management.

The Council subsequently held an oversight hearing on implementing the report card's recommendations, at which Hendon and other DVS officials testified about efforts to improve transparency, outreach, and strategic planning.

NYHealth, in testimony submitted to the Council, described a "high-performing City Department of Veterans' Services" as "essential" to meeting veterans' health needs and recommended continued support for proactive outreach programs such as Mission: VetCheck, as well as stronger cross-agency collaboration to prevent suicide and "deaths of despair" among veterans.

== See also ==
- New York State Department of Veterans' Services
- United States Department of Veterans Affairs
- Government of New York City
- Homeless veterans in the United States
