= Richard Hongisto =

American politician

Richard D. Hongisto
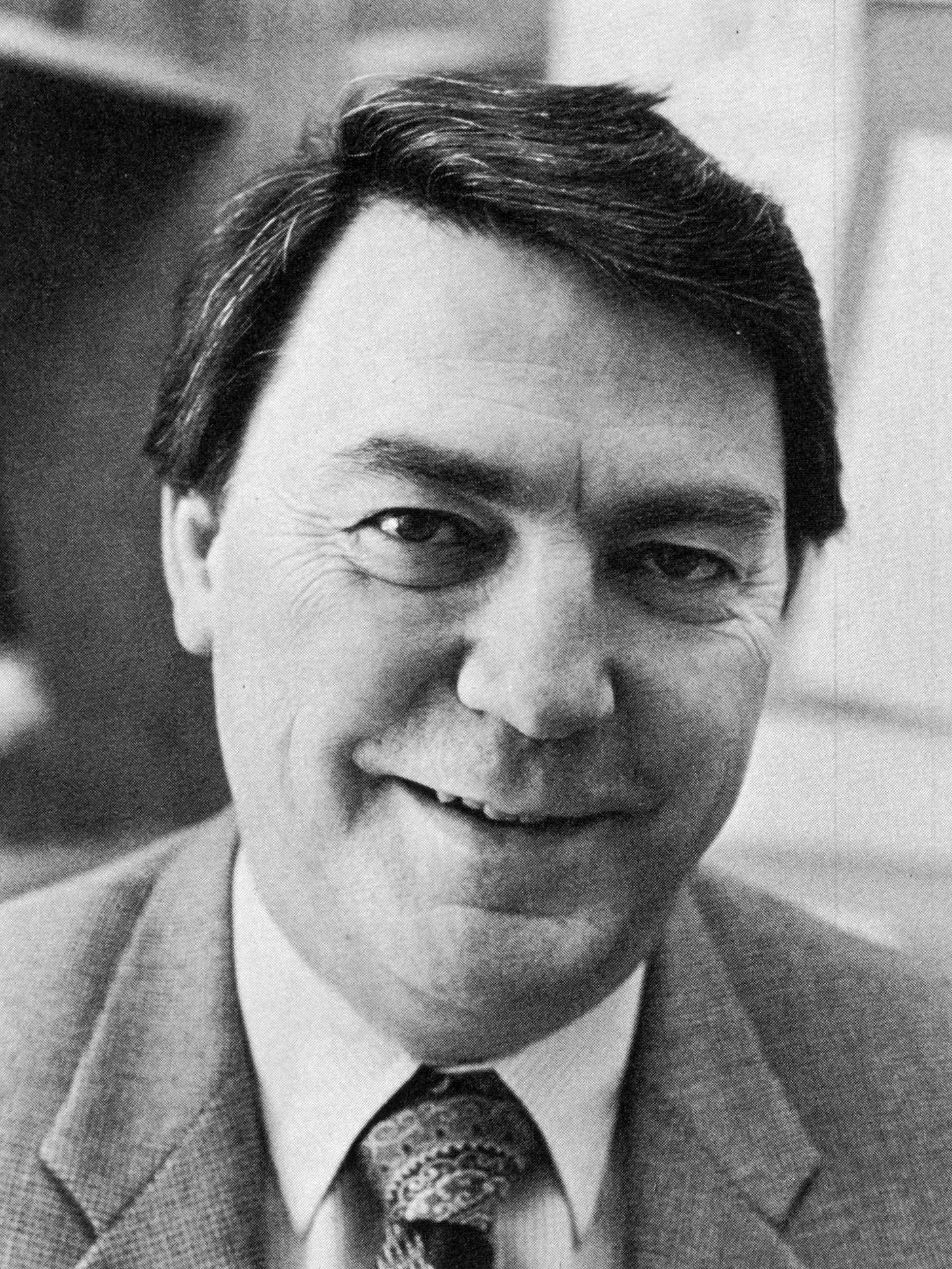
- Hongisto in 1983

Chief of the San Francisco Police Department
- In office April 1, 1992 – May 15, 1992
- Mayor: Frank Jordan
- Preceded by: William Casey
- Succeeded by: Anthony Ribera

Assessor-Recorder of San Francisco
- In office January 8, 1991 – April 1, 1992
- Preceded by: Sam Duca
- Succeeded by: Doris M. Ward

Member of the San Francisco Board of Supervisors for the at-large district
- In office January 8, 1981 – January 8, 1991
- Preceded by: District established
- Succeeded by: Kevin Shelley

Acting Commissioner of the New York Department of Corrections
- In office 1978–1979
- Governor: Hugh Carey
- Preceded by: Benjamin Ward
- Succeeded by: Thomas Coughlin III

Chief of the Cleveland Division of Police
- In office December 14, 1977 – March 24, 1978
- Mayor: Dennis Kucinich
- Preceded by: Michael Aherns
- Succeeded by: Jeffrey Fox

31st Sheriff of San Francisco
- In office January 8, 1972 – December 11, 1977
- Preceded by: Matthew C. Carberry
- Succeeded by: Eugene A. Brown

Personal details
- Born: Richard Duane Hongisto; December 16, 1936 Bovey, Minnesota, U.S.
- Died: November 4, 2004 (aged 67) San Francisco, California, U.S.
- Spouse: Susan Chavez (m. 1993; died 1994)
- Police career
- Department: San Francisco Sheriff's Department; Cleveland Division of Police; San Francisco Police Department
- Service years: San Francisco: 1958–1977; Cleveland: 1977–1978; San Francisco: 1992
- Rank: Sheriff; Chief

Richard Duane Hongisto (December 16, 1936 – November 4, 2004) was a businessman, politician, sheriff, and police chief of San Francisco, California, and Cleveland, Ohio.

== Early life and education ==
Of Finnish descent, Hongisto was the son of Gladys Longrie and Raymond Hongisto. In 1942, Dick moved to San Francisco with his parents and brother Don.

"Hongisto grew up in the city's Richmond and Fillmore districts, and his parents ran a grocery store in the Sunnydale neighborhood."

Dick graduated from George Washington High School. He later attended San Francisco City College. While completing a bachelor's degree at San Francisco State University, Hongisto became an officer of the San Francisco Police Department (SFPD).

== Career ==
=== Early career ===
Hongisto was a co-founder of Officers for Justice, an organization of officers who were primarily racial minorities or gay.

Hongisto ran for sheriff in 1971, defeating the incumbent, Matthew Carberry, who had been a four-term sheriff.

He was the first sheriff to hire gay and lesbian deputies, and later became embroiled in controversy when he deliberately delayed the eviction of residents from the International Hotel, a residential hotel in Manilatown, San Francisco, next to Chinatown, San Francisco.

After a long period where he refused to order the eviction, which included time spent in the San Mateo County jail on contempt of court charges, Hongisto eventually carried out the mass eviction.

=== Cleveland ===
After serving as the sheriff in San Francisco, Hongisto briefly moved to Cleveland, Ohio in 1977, where he served as police chief under Mayor Dennis Kucinich. His penchant for controversy, and conflicts with Kucinich, eventually led to his being fired by the mayor on live local television. In Cleveland his firing sparked a recall drive to remove Kucinich from office.

=== New York State ===
The Governor of the State of New York then invited Hongisto to manage that state's prison system. Permanent appointment to this position required confirmation by the state senate, which was not forthcoming. Hongisto therefore returned to San Francisco to run for supervisor in 1980.

=== Return to San Francisco ===
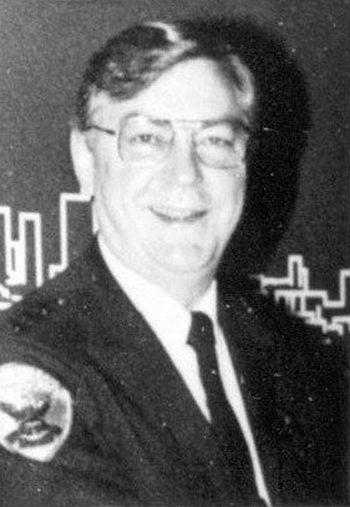
Hongisto as Chief of the San Francisco Police Department in 1992.

Upon his return to San Francisco, Hongisto was elected to the San Francisco Board of Supervisors, where he helped to place Proposition M, a measure which would limit construction of high rise commercial buildings, on the public ballot.

With the endorsement of then-Mayor Art Agnos, Hongisto later ran for the office of Assessor.

In 1991, he ran for mayor but did not make the run-off, coming in fourth. After declining to endorse Agnos for re-election as mayor, in a race won by police chief Frank Jordan, Hongisto was appointed in 1992 by Jordan to be San Francisco's police chief.

Hongisto's tenure as police chief lasted only six weeks, and was punctuated by controversy over his handling of demonstrations and riots which occurred in the wake of the Rodney King police brutality trial in Los Angeles. Hongisto cordoned off an entire neighborhood in the Mission district on a Saturday afternoon, establishing a net that saw the arrests of all people on the street, demonstrators and ordinary citizens alike. Hongisto had rented city buses to transport the arrested citizens, and they were processed at a warehouse on San Francisco's wharfs. Instead of merely citing and releasing those arrested, Hongisto ordered that they be arrested and processed at the Santa Rita jail in Dublin (Alameda County), rather than in San Francisco County. This enraged progressive activists and civil libertarians as well as the San Francisco Board of Supervisors, which ordered Hongisto to release the citizens he had arrested. On the following Saturday, Hongisto ordered police to disrupt another demonstration and arrested demonstrators with no order to disperse. Both incidences were later the targets of class action suits against the city of San Francisco, although the former, undertaken by the Lawyer's Guild, would not be resolved for nearly a decade.

Soon thereafter, a gay and lesbian community newspaper, the San Francisco Bay Times, published a cover graphic of Hongisto's head pasted on the body of a lesbian activist. The activist, dressed in a police uniform, held a giant baton with one end protruding from the groin area as if it were an erect penis. The headline screamed, "Dick's Cool New Tool: Martial Law", in reference to the police actions. What happened afterwards is subject to dispute. Hongisto claimed that he had asked members of the police union to gather copies of the paper to show members of the rank and file what he was enduring in the activist press, in reaction to their criticism of his supposedly failing to properly defend their conduct of the arrests during the King riots. Around 2,000 copies of the free papers were taken from news racks by three officers and later found stored at the Mission District police station. Hongisto was publicly accused of ordering the confiscation of the papers in attempt at censorship, a charge he continued to deny up to his death. After a hearing, the San Francisco Police Commission found him culpable, and Mayor Jordan dismissed him. One of those three officers, Gary Delagnes, later became president of the San Francisco Police Officers Association.

== Personal life ==
In 1993, Hongisto married Susan Chavez, who was 23 years his junior. On September 24, 1994, Chavez Hongisto died of an asthma attack brought on by smoking crack cocaine.

Hongisto left public life to become a full-time businessman and real estate investor, apart from an unsuccessful run for County Supervisor in 2000.

Hongisto died of a heart attack on November 4, 2004, at the age of 67, leaving behind a son and daughter. He married four times, and was living with a 31-year-old girlfriend at the time of his death.

== Electoral history ==
Richard Hongisto electoral history

San Francisco sheriff election, 1971
Party	Candidate	Votes	%
Nonpartisan	Richard Hongisto	81,403	36.33%
Nonpartisan	Matthew Carberry (incumbent)	59,848	26.71%
Nonpartisan	Matthew O'Connor	49,802	22.23%
Nonpartisan	William Bigarani	33,015	14.73%
Total votes		224,068	100.00%
Democratic gain from Republican			

San Francisco sheriff election, 1975
Party	Candidate	Votes	%
Nonpartisan	Richard Hongisto (incumbent)	96,009	49.62%
Nonpartisan	Michael Nevin	30,861	15.95%
Nonpartisan	Eugene Pratt	27,126	14.02%
Nonpartisan	William Bigarani	23,436	12.11%
Nonpartisan	Walter Rabenorth	8,343	4.31%
Nonpartisan	Bob Geary	7,723	3.99%
Total votes		193,498	100.00%
Democratic hold			

San Francisco Board of Supervisors election, 1980
Party	Candidate	Votes	%

San Francisco Board of Supervisors election, 1982
Party	Candidate	Votes	%

San Francisco Board of Supervisors election, 1986
Party	Candidate	Votes	%

San Francisco assessor-recorder election, 1990
Party	Candidate	Votes	%

San Francisco mayoral primary election, 1991
Party	Candidate	Votes	%
Nonpartisan	Frank Jordan	59,928	31.88%
Nonpartisan	Art Agnos (incumbent)	51,714	27.51%
Nonpartisan	Angela Alioto	34,910	18.57%
Nonpartisan	Tom Hsieh	18,241	9.70%
Nonpartisan	Richard Hongisto	17,663	9.40%
Nonpartisan	Gloria La Riva	2,552	1.36%
Nonpartisan	Joni Jacobs	1,397	0.74%
Nonpartisan	Cesar Ascarrunz	724	0.39%
Nonpartisan	Ellis Keyes	337	0.18%
Nonpartisan	Dehnert Queen	310	0.17%
Nonpartisan	Peter Planteen	214	0.11%
Total votes		187,990	100.00%
Democratic hold			

San Francisco Board of Supervisors election, 1992
Party	Candidate	Votes	%

San Francisco Board of Supervisors primary election (district 5), 2000
Party	Candidate	Votes	%
Nonpartisan	Matt Gonzalez	12,743	42.30%
Nonpartisan	Juanita Owens	8,589	28.51%
Nonpartisan	Agar Jaicks	3,621	12.02%
Nonpartisan	Holman Turner, Jr.	1,273	4.23%
Nonpartisan	Richard Hongisto	1,210	4.02%
Nonpartisan	Joe Konopka	789	2.62%
Nonpartisan	Jay Bagi	743	2.47%
Nonpartisan	Nicholas Gaffney	504	1.67%
Nonpartisan	Demian Barrett	324	1.08%
Nonpartisan	John Palmer	163	0.54%
Nonpartisan	Rob Anderson	106	0.35%
Nonpartisan	Write-in votes	60	0.20%
Invalid or blank votes		5,990	16.59%
Total votes		36,115	100.00%

San Francisco assessor-recorder primary election, 2002
Party	Candidate	Votes	%
Nonpartisan	Mabel Teng	39,648	30.62%
Nonpartisan	Doris M. Ward (incumbent)	29,414	22.71%
Nonpartisan	Ronald Chun	24,346	18.80%
Nonpartisan	John Farrell	18,784	14.51%
Nonpartisan	Richard Hongisto	11,446	8.84%
Nonpartisan	Jim Rodriguez	5,714	4.41%
Nonpartisan	Write-in votes	141	0.11%
Total votes		129,493	100.00%

Police appointments
Preceded by Matthew C. Carberry	Sheriff of San Francisco	Succeeded by Eugene A. Brown
Preceded by Michael Aherns	Chief of the Cleveland Division of Police	Succeeded by Jeffrey Fox
Preceded by William Casey	Chief of the San Francisco Police Department	Succeeded by Anthony Ribera
Political offices
Preceded by Benjamin Ward	Acting Commissioner of the New York Department of Corrections; Acting	Succeeded by Thomas Coughlin III
Preceded by District-based elections	Member of the San Francisco Board of Supervisors from the at-large district (seat 2)	Succeeded by Kevin Shelley
Preceded by Sam Duca	Assessor-Recorder of San Francisco	Succeeded by Doris M. Ward
