= Narcology =

Branch of medicine

Narcologist
Occupation
- Names: Addictionist/addictionologist, Physician
- Occupation type: Specialty
- Activity sectors: Medicine

Description
- Education required: Doctor of Medicine (M.D.); Doctor of Osteopathic medicine (D.O.); Bachelor of Medicine, Bachelor of Surgery (M.B.B.S.); Bachelor of Medicine, Bachelor of Surgery (MBChB)
- Fields of employment: Hospitals, clinics

Narcology (Russian: наркология: narkológija), from Russian нарко- (narco-, pertaining to narcotics, illicit drugs) + -логия (-logy, "branch of study") is a subspecialty of psychiatry dealing with the prevention, treatment, diagnosis, social care and recovery of drug-dependent persons. The study and science of phenomena of "narcomania", (Note: '"Narcomania"' (наркомания: narkománija: from "narcotic" + "μανία" [madness]) is a Russian narcological term for "drug addiction" or "drug abuse" (the term usually refers to illicit, forbidden by law drugs).) "toxicomania", (Note: '"Toxicomania'" (токсикомания: toksikománija: from "toxic" + "μανία" [madness]) is narcological term for "inhalant abuser", "volatile substances", "benzine", "glue", etc. (related to only non-forbidden drugs)) chronic alcoholism, and its ætiology, pathogenesis, and clinical aspects. The term for a practitioner of narcology is narcologist. In the United States, the comparable terms are "addiction medicine" and "addictionist".

Narcology was introduced as a separated medical specialty in the Soviet Union during the early 1960s through the 1970s. The term "narcology" is used especially in the countries of the former Soviet Union, including Russia.

== Human right violations in Russia ==
United Nations bodies and human rights organizations have documented human rights violations against people who use drugs in Russia, including the absolute prohibition on opioid substitution therapy and methadone maintenance treatment, the use of unscientific methods in the treatment of addictive disorders, the absence of drug dependence treatment for people with serious medical conditions.

== See also ==
- Addiction psychiatry
- Addiction medicine

== Further literature ==
- Stoimenov, Y. A.; Stoimenova, M. Y.; Koeva, P. Y. (2003). Психиатрический энциклопедический словарь [Psychiatric Encyclopaedic Dictionary] (in Russian). Киев: МАУП. p. 565. ISBN 966-608-306-X.
- Elovich, Richard; Drucker, Ernest (2008). "On drug treatment and social control: Russian narcology's great leap backwards". Harm Reduction Journal. 5 (1): 23. doi:10.1186/1477-7517-5-23. ISSN 1477-7517. PMC 2474597. PMID 18577225.
