= Loree Sutton =

American psychiatrist and retired military officer

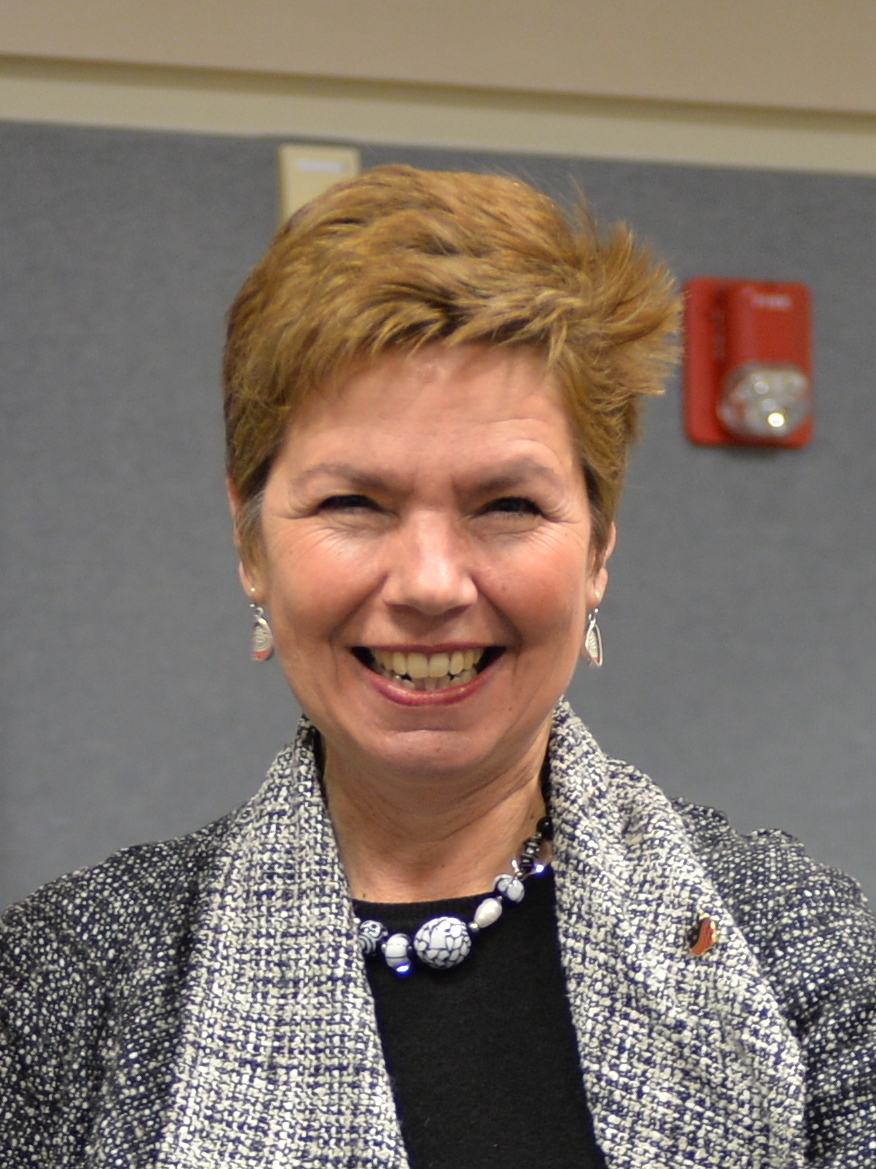

Commissioner of the New York City Department of Veterans' Services
- In office July 2016 – November 2019
- Appointed by: Bill de Blasio
- Succeeded by: James Hendon

Personal details
- Born: July 15, 1959 (age 67) Loma Linda, California, U.S.
- Party: Democratic
- Spouse: Laurie Leitch (m. 2015)
- Education: Pacific Union College (BS); Loma Linda University (MD); National War College (MS)

Military service
- Allegiance: United States
- Branch/service: United States Army
- Rank: Brigadier General
- Commands: DeWitt Army Community Hospital; Carl R. Darnall Army Medical Center
- Battles/wars: Gulf War
- Awards: Legion of Merit; Bronze Star

Loree K. Sutton (born July 15, 1959) is an American psychiatrist and retired military officer who served as a brigadier general in the United States Army.

Sutton served for over twenty years and was awarded a Bronze Star. From 2007 to 2010, She was the Army's highest-ranking psychiatrist.

In 2014, New York City Mayor Bill de Blasio appointed Sutton as Commissioner of the New York City Department of Veterans' Services. Sutton was a candidate in the 2021 New York City Democratic mayoral primary.

== Early life and education ==
Sutton was born and raised in Loma Linda, California. Her mother, Lavaun Sutton, was a former cardiac intensive care nurse.

Sutton graduated from Pacific Union College with a Bachelor of Science in business administration in 1981. Sutton graduated from medical school at Loma Linda University in 1985, and completed her internship and residency in psychiatry at Letterman Army Medical Center. She is also a graduate of the U.S. Army Command and General Staff College, with an M.S. in national security strategic studies, and the National War College.

== Career ==
=== Military service ===
Sutton served in the United States military for over 20 years. She was deployed to Saudi Arabia, Iraq, Kuwait, and Egypt in support of the first Gulf War and other missions.

Sutton was commander of the Carl R. Darnall Army Medical Center in Fort Hood, Texas, beginning in 2005, commander of the DeWitt Army Community Hospital, Deputy Commander for clinical services at the General Leonard Wood Army Community Hospital, and a special assistant to the Surgeon General of the United States Army.

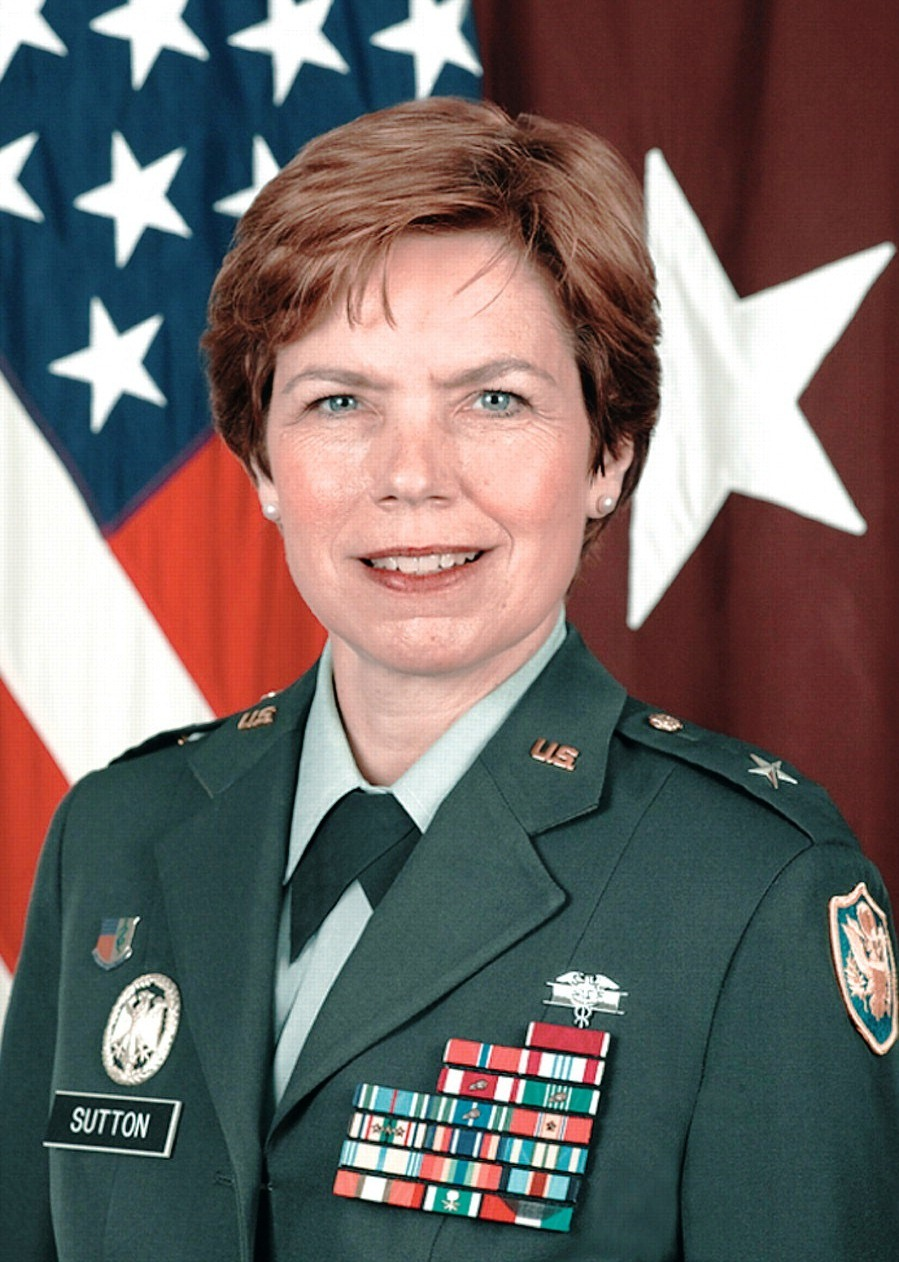
Sutton in 2008

Sutton was the founding director of the Defense Centers of Excellence for Psychological Health and Traumatic Brain Injury in 2007, and was a special assistant to the Assistant Secretary of Defense for Health Affairs. She was the United States Army's highest-ranking psychiatrist from 2007 to 2010.

During her career, Sutton received many awards, including the Legion of Merit, Bronze Star Medal, Defense Meritorious Service Medal, and Order of Military Medical Merit. She was one of only 15 female generals out of the 1.3 million soldiers serving in the Army. She retired from the military in 2010.

=== Politics ===
In 2014, New York City Mayor Bill de Blasio appointed Sutton as Commissioner of the Mayor's Office of Veterans’ Affairs, and from 2017 to 2019, was the Commissioner of the newly formed New York City Department of Veterans’ Services. She resigned in October 2019 to launch her campaign for Mayor of New York City. She struggled to raise money and never polled higher than 2%, resulting in her dropping out on March 10, 2021.

== Personal life ==
At the NYC Pride March in 2015, Sutton proposed to her lesbian partner Laurie Leitch.
