= New York State Department of Veterans' Services =

State agency for veterans' benefits in New York

Agency overview
- Formed: April 1, 2023; 3 years ago
- Preceding agency: New York State Division of Veterans' Services
- Jurisdiction: New York State government
- Headquarters: 2 Empire State Plaza, Albany, New York
- Agency executive: Viviana DeCohen, Commissioner of Veterans' Services
- Website: veterans.ny.gov

The New York State Department of Veterans' Services (DVS) is a cabinet-level agency of the State of New York that serves as the state's primary advocacy and assistance office for military veterans, service members, and their families. The department provides free benefits-advising and representation to help claimants access federal, state, local, and private veterans' benefits, and works with other public agencies and community partners on issues such as health care, housing, education, and employment.

The department was formally established on April 1, 2023, when the long-standing New York State Division of Veterans' Services—created in 1945—was elevated to a standalone department under a new Veterans' Services Law. According to the state budget office and contemporary news coverage, the creation of the department marked the first time in more than fifty years that New York established a new state agency, the last being the Department of Environmental Conservation in 1970.

The department is led by the New York State commissioner of veterans' services, a position that must be held by a veteran and is appointed by the governor. As of 2023, the commissioner is Viviana DeCohen, a United States Marine Corps veteran who previously directed the Division of Veterans' Services.

== History ==
=== Division of Veterans' Services (1945–2023) ===
New York established the Division of Veterans' Services in 1945 as part of the Executive Department, making it the state's central advocacy office for veterans returning from the Second World War. Over subsequent decades, the division's responsibilities expanded through amendments to state law, including duties related to counseling and claims assistance, property tax exemptions, supplemental burial allowances, annuities for certain disabled veterans and their survivors, and support for county and city veterans' service agencies.

In 2019, the Restoration of Honor Act (A8097/S45B) authorized the division to review certain "other-than-honorable" or general discharges and issue advisory determinations restoring access to state veterans' benefits for veterans whose discharge status was related to post-traumatic stress disorder, traumatic brain injury, military sexual trauma, or discrimination based on sexual orientation or gender identity. News coverage described the law as making New York one of the first states to restore eligibility for state benefits to LGBTQ+ veterans and others whose discharge was tied to these conditions. Legislation in this period also required the agency to issue a report every three years with statistics on veteran homelessness, unemployment, suicide, and related indicators to help guide state policy.

=== Elevation to a department ===
Beginning in the late 2010s, state policymakers and outside researchers examined New York's veterans' services system and recommended elevating the division to cabinet level to strengthen coordination with other agencies, increase funding, and modernize service delivery. A report commissioned by the New York Health Foundation compared New York with higher-performing state veterans' agencies and urged establishing a well-funded, independent veterans department with a strong role in statewide coordination.

In 2021, legislation was introduced in the New York State Legislature to create a new Veterans' Services Law, transfer provisions from the Executive Law, and establish a Department of Veterans' Services headed by a commissioner. The Veterans' Services Law provides that "there is hereby created a department of veterans' services" and specifies that the department is led by the New York State commissioner of veterans' services, who must be a veteran appointed by the governor. The restructuring, implemented in connection with the state budget, took effect on April 1, 2023, at which point the former division's personnel, programs, and duties were transferred to the new department. Spectrum News described the change as creating New York's first new state agency in more than fifty years, noting that the last such creation was the Department of Environmental Conservation in 1970.

Under the new framework, a statewide Veterans' Services Commission was created to advise on policy and provide additional oversight of the department's work, including its reporting on key indicators such as veteran homelessness and suicide. Subsequent reporting noted that the transition initially caused some confusion for veterans and local partners as state officials worked to explain the shift from a division to a full cabinet-level department.

=== Proposed renaming ===
In 2025, legislation was introduced in the Assembly and Senate that would rename the Veterans' Services Law as the Veterans and Military Families Law and change the department's name to the Department of Veterans and Military Families, while retaining its core functions and leadership structure. As of November 2025, the proposal remained under consideration, and the agency continued to operate under the title Department of Veterans' Services.

== Responsibilities and services ==
=== Advocacy and benefits counseling ===
The department's stated mission is to advocate on behalf of New York's veterans and their families so that they receive benefits to which they are entitled based on service in the United States armed forces. DVS provides free benefits advising through a statewide network of field offices staffed by Veterans Benefits Advisors, who are themselves veterans. Advisors assist veterans, spouses, dependents, and survivors in completing applications, gathering supporting documentation, and filing claims and appeals for a wide range of benefits, including those administered by the United States Department of Veterans Affairs and by New York State.

DVS works closely with federal, state, local, and private agencies to connect clients to services involving health care, mental health, home care, rehabilitation, employment, housing, education, and tax exemptions. The department maintains a toll-free telephone line and online appointment system, and it partners with other state agencies to publicize programs and coordinate outreach.

=== State-level programs ===
Through provisions carried over from the Executive Law and subsequent amendments, the department administers or helps implement several state veterans' benefits and programs, including:

- advisory determinations under the Restoration of Honor Act, which can restore access to state veterans' benefits for certain veterans with less-than-honorable discharges;
- New York State supplemental burial allowances for eligible veterans and their families;
- annuities for qualifying blind veterans and, in some circumstances, their surviving spouses;
- support and guidance for county and city veterans' service agencies, which operate local offices across the state;
- assistance related to state property tax exemptions and other state-authorized tax relief for veterans and their survivors;
- collaboration on initiatives such as Operation Recognition, which awards high school diplomas to certain veterans who left school to serve in wartime.

The department also participates in mandated reporting and data collection on veteran homelessness, employment, and mental health outcomes to guide state policy and budget decisions.

== Organization ==
The Department of Veterans' Services is created by statute as an executive-branch department of the State of New York. Its head, the New York State commissioner of veterans' services, must be a veteran and is appointed by the governor to serve at the governor's pleasure. The commissioner's duties include overseeing the department's programs, coordinating with other state and federal agencies, advising the governor and legislature on issues affecting veterans, and appointing staff as authorized by law and the state budget.

DVS is headquartered at Empire State Plaza in Albany, New York, and operates a network of field offices and satellite locations throughout the state, including offices co-located with federal Department of Veterans Affairs facilities and other state agencies. The department's Veterans Benefits Advisors provide in-person and virtual services, and partner agencies such as the New York State Department of Labor and local veterans' service agencies refer clients to DVS for benefits counseling.

A statewide Veterans' Services Commission, created in conjunction with the department, advises the commissioner and reviews the department's performance on key indicators such as access to benefits, homelessness, and suicide prevention efforts among veterans.

== See also ==
- Government of New York (state)
- New York City Department of Veterans' Services
- New York State Division of Military and Naval Affairs
- United States Department of Veterans Affairs
