= Newspaper theft =

Removal or destruction of newspapers

Newspaper theft is a crime where significant portion of a newspaper print or other publication is stolen or destroyed in order to prevent others from reading its content, including those publications that are available for free. It is most commonly undertaken by individuals, organization, or governments and is considered a form of censorship.

== Overview ==
The motivation for newspaper theft is usually to suppress circulation of a story, item, or advertisement that is viewed as unfavorable or offensive by an individual or group. In some cases, the action is motivated by a generalized animus toward the editorial slant of the publication. The actors involved in newspaper thefts vary; they include political groups, fraternities and sororities, college athletic teams, as well as politicians or public officials, who may order police or other government agents to remove copies of the publication.

The Student Press Law Center (SPLC) has tracked college newspaper thefts since 2000. Total newspaper thefts reported to the SPLC peaked in 2002 with 94,000 copies being stolen in that year in 33 separate instances of theft.

== Laws concerning newspaper theft ==
=== Legal definition ===
Theft is defined in the Encyclopædia Britannica as, "the physical removal of an object that is capable of being stolen without the consent of the owner and with the intention of depriving the owner of it permanently". The unpaid taking of newspapers which are for sale constitutes a theft, as does unauthorized taking of newspapers that have been delivered to subscribers or have yet to be distributed. People's right to distribute and consume the content contained in newspapers is not only protected by individual rights to property, but also protected against government seizure under First Amendment rights which prevent the government from limiting the freedom of expression, although the right of private individuals or organizations to do so varies by state and local law.

=== Laws relating to free newspapers ===
In response to high-profile incidents, laws specifically against newspaper theft, including the theft of large numbers of free newspapers, which does not constitute theft under U.S. federal law, have been passed in the states of Maryland, Colorado, and California and the cities of San Francisco and Berkeley, California. However, in July 2012 a commission that reviews laws recommended that Colorado's law making the theft of free newspapers a crime be repealed, the Colorado legislator then repealed the law and the theft of free newspapers is no longer a crime in Colorado as of July 2013. The Maryland law makes it a misdemeanor offense when "A person ... knowingly or willfully obtain[s] or exert[s] control that is unauthorized over newspapers with the intent to prevent another from reading the newspapers." These laws are based on a logic that newspapers, especially less powerful local papers with smaller print runs, serve a valuable expression of speech that must be protected from censorship which cannon otherwise be prosecuted as a theft.

=== Purchase with the intent to block distribution ===
A related and less common phenomenon is the clandestine purchase of a large portion of the print run of a newspaper. While this does not normally violate any law, the United States Court of Appeals for the Third Circuit ruled in the 2004 case Rossignol v. Voorhaar that public officials who purchase a large portion of the print run of a newspaper with the intention of keeping a story out of the view of the public are acting in violation of the First Amendment and are liable for civil damages. This decision was later upheld by Supreme Court without hearing. The decision was made on the basis that these officials were in violation of both 42 U.S.C. § 1983 and Md. Code, Criminal Law § 7- 106(b).

== Government engaging in newspaper theft ==
There have been various instances where governments or private individuals, directly related to their role or conduct within government or as a government official, will use newspaper theft as a tool to censure newspapers and other publications. This action is generally undertaken to limit the spread of information that is viewed as unsavory by the thief. The following are specific examples of instances of censorship through the use newspaper theft by government officials.

=== Rossignol v. Voorhaar ===
A summary of the facts of the case area as follows: Kenneth Rossignol is the owner of the St. Mary's Today newspaper, a weekly newspaper in St. Mary's County, Maryland that was known for being critical of local officials, including Richard Voorhaar, the county sheriff. Voorhaar anticipated that the November 1998 election day print of the St. Mary's Today would be especially critical of Voorhaar and other candidates supported by Voorhaar, including his close friend and candidate for St. Mary's County State's Attorney, Richard Fritz. As a result, deputies in the Sheriff's Office devised a plan to buy out all the copies of the St. Mary's Today that were being sold around the county in order to limit the spread of the information that it contained and "to piss [Rossignol] off", with $500 each being committed to the plan by Voorhaar and Fritz. The headline for that day's issue of the St. Mary's Today was "Fritz Guilty of Rape", referencing a case that involved Fritz dating from 1965. The issue also included various other articles that were critical of Fritz and Voorhaar and place them in a negative light, including an instance where Voorhaar poorly handled a case of sexual harassment in the Sheriff's Office. Of the 6,000 copies of the St. Mary's Today that were issued on election day, at least 1,600 of the copies were either purchased or seized before 7:00 am by deputies, making them very difficult to find around the town. Richard Voorhaar won his bid for reelection as Sheriff and Richard Fritz was elected to his first term as State's Attorney. In November 1999 Rossignol sued Voorhaar, Fritz, and the deputies that were involved. In January 2003 Chief Judge Wilkinson of the U.S. Court of Appeals for the fourth circuit decided in favor of Rossignol. Rossignol later received a settlement of $435,000 in April 2005.

=== Coming Up v. City and County of San Francisco ===
Richard Hongisto was the Police Chief of San Francisco for 44 days ending on March 15, 1992, a period which overlapped with the verdict in the Rodney King case. On March 8, 1992 the Bay Times, a free local biweekly gay newspaper, published a front-page story that was critical of the way that Hongisto handled demonstrators in San Francisco following the results of the case. Reportedly, Hongisto directed a sergeant to remove access to the papers from the public, ultimately resulting in police inspector Jerry Golz and officer Tom Yuen confiscating the papers from free newsstands on the morning of May 8, 1992. During that morning, the Bay Times estimated that between 2,000 and 4,000 copies of the newspaper were confiscated by Hongisto's officers. Hongisto maintained that he never had any intention of confiscating the papers and that the papers had been taken by the officers after he suggested that the days copy of the paper be distributed among the San Francisco police officers. The San Francisco Police Commission investigated the issue and, on May 15, 1992, decided by a unanimous vote to discharge from the police force due to the fact that, as commission Chairman Harry Low stated, Hongisto had, "exercised poor judgment and abused his power in this incident".

== Newspaper theft on university campuses ==
Newspaper theft on college campuses poses a complicated legal issue because many student run papers are made available for free, as a result pursuing legal action against individuals that take many copies of the paper with the intent to censure or destroy them can often be very difficult, if not impossible. As a result of these difficulties, SPLC recommends that student papers include language in their advertisements that states that while the first copy of the paper is free for students, subsequent copies must be purchased at some predefined price. By giving a price to all the copies taken after the first one, free student run newspapers can pursue legal actions against those that engage in newspaper theft using the common theft laws in states where there are no specific laws protecting free newspapers from attempts to censure them. Even when the paper has no listed sales price, free papers can seek monetary damages as the result of costs or lost revenues associated with printing cost, other production costs, delivery costs, and revenue that is needed to refund advertisers. As of December 2018, Maryland and California have laws specifically prohibiting taking large amounts of free newspapers.

=== Student government ===
There have been various instances of student government officials taking part in newspaper theft as a means to censure stories run by student run newspapers or as an act of retaliation against stories published or research being conducted by these organizations. Of the instances of newspaper theft that have been reported to the SPLC as of 2010, 31 of them have been reportedly conducted by thieves that were associated with student government organizations.

One instance of newspaper theft on a college campus occurred by student government officials at the University of Wisconsin-Milwaukee after the UWM Post published a story that was critical of an event that was put on by student government to introduce freshman students to the area surrounding campus. Reportedly, the president, Alex Kostal, SA office manager, Andrew Hapka, and Rules and the Rules and Oversight Committee Chairman, David Sidhu, were all involved in this instance of newspaper theft, although Sidhu and Kostal deny having any involvement in the theft. The UWM Post reported that Kostal had directed Hapka to steal the newspapers in order to limit the amount of criticism that reached the student government officials who had organized the event. Surveillance footage dated on October 31, 2011 then showed Hapka stealing the papers, after which Hapka admitted that he took the papers to Sidhu's car where they drove to dispose of the papers in the trash. The UWM Post estimated that 800 of copies of the paper were stolen and disposed of by the student government officials. Kostal, Hapka, and Sidhu all resigned from their posts within student government. The UWM Post decided to civilly sue Kostal and Sidhu as representatives of the state, after consulting the SPLC, for violation of the paper's first amendment rights.

In many cases the culprits of newspaper theft on college campuses go unpunished because no official investigation is conducted due to the fact that the papers are free or because there is simply not enough evidence to point to a specific suspect or group of suspects. On April 20, 2009 the Highlander, a student run newspaper at the University of California at Riverside published an article critical of a $5000 expense by then student president Roxanna Sanchez to fly herself and her intern out to a conference that was not approved by the school. The morning that the story was published between 1,200 and 2,000 copies of the paper were stolen from the racks where they were being distributed. Ultimately, the theft was not investigated by the University or the University of California Police Department because the papers were available for free and there were no limits on how many copies each student could take. Likewise, after the Technician, North Carolina State University's student-run newspaper, published a story that leaked the real name of a candidate that was running anonymously as "The Pirate Captain", 5000 copies of the paper were stolen across campus. No evidence was discovered that implicated an individual in the crime, and because the paper had no value it was initially not investigated by the University's police department. Newspaper theft against free newspapers in an attempt to censure their content may not be investigated, as demonstrated in the two cases above, because no monetary value can be given to an item that is available free of charge.

=== Fraternities and sororities ===
Greek organizations may engage in newspaper theft as a way to limit the dissemination of negative stories that are published on the organizations, such as sexual assault, hazing, or poor living conditions. Of the instances of newspaper theft that have been reported to the SPLC as of 2010, 41 of the cases of theft were associated with articles published on fraternities or sororities.

The Tulane Hullabaloo, a student run newspaper at Tulane University, reported in February 2013 on a story regarding a drug bust in which two members of the Kappa Sigma fraternity bought ecstasy from an undercover police officer. The story was published on February 28, 2013 and that day staff of the Hullabaloo found the paper in the trash and later saw two men throwing the papers away in the trash. The witness took an image of these two men and they were later identified to be Jason Polsky and Alexander Montiel, both pledges of Kappa Sigma who admitted to having stolen the newspapers. Roughly 2,000 copies of the paper were stolen and because the paper assigned a value of $1 for every paper after 2 taken, the Kappa Sigma pledges were required to compensate The Tulane Hullabaloo for the copies that they had stolen.

In October 2006, the Reporter, a student-run paper at the Stetson University, ran a story on the University temporarily relocating members of the Zeta Tau Alpha sorority due to their house being in poor condition, including having evidence of mold. Later on the day that the paper was distributed, staff members of the Reporter were made aware that copies of the day's paper had disappeared from distribution points all across campus. One member of the staff even saw a sorority member stuffing copies of the paper into her backpack. The sorority claimed that the actions were done by a single individual, not organized by the sorority as a whole, but still agreed to pay the Reporter $1,200 so that they could reprint the issue.

On February 24, 2016, the Chanticleer, the student run newspaper for Coastal Carolina University (CCU), published an article on the student government associated race that included a reference to the CCU chapter of the Kappa Sigma fraternity being suspended from the University as the result of sexual assault and a hazing allegations. In reality, the fraternity had not been suspended as the result of hazing allegations and the Chanticleer issued a correction that same day that corrected the mistake that had been made on the article. On February 24, 2016 4,500 copies of the student newspaper went missing, including copies of the previous edition as the newspaper has a weekly circulation of only 3,300.

== In popular culture ==
In the film Absence of Malice, the character Teresa Perrone attempts unsuccessfully to destroy a run of newspapers that has a story exposing her abortion, before she commits suicide. In an episode of King of the Hill, Hank removes an embarrassing photograph from all his neighbor's local newspapers before they woke up that morning. In an episode of Better Call Saul, Chuck McGill stole a newspaper from a neighbor's house to see what his brother, Jimmy, was hiding from him.
