= Sujata Tewari =

Indian-American neuroscientist

Sujata Tewari (1938–2000) was an Indian-American neuroscientist known for her work with Ernest Noble that demonstrated that chronic alcohol consumption inhibits protein metabolism in the brains of mice.

== Early life and education ==
Tewari was born and raised in Murshidabad, West Bengal, and began her higher education in India. She earned a bachelor's degree in chemistry at Agra University, graduating in 1955, and a master's degree in biochemistry from Lucknow University in 1957. She received a Ph.D. in biochemistry from McGill University in 1962 and a Psy.D. from the American Behavioral Studies Institute in 1996.

== Career and research ==
After working for a time at a Veterans Administration hospital in California, Tewari received an appointment at the University of California, Irvine. Here she discovered the effects of ethanol on protein metabolism, and researched fetal alcohol syndrome, alcoholism, and the effects of ethanol on the development of fetal astrocytes. She founded the Alcohol Research Center at UC Irvine with Louis A. Gottschalk, and was its director.
