= International Society of Addiction Medicine =

- Formation: 1999
- Type: Professional association
- Website: www.isaddictionmedicine.org

International Society of Addiction Medicine (ISAM), created in 1999, is an organization constituted of professional medical practitioners, physicians, and clinicians from 93 countries.

== Mission ==
ISAM as its mission has developed activities to bridge evidence with International practice. ISAM organizes various conferences across the world related to addiction medicine.

The International Society of Addiction Medicine aims in transmitting knowledge of addiction that it is a treatable disease, enhancing the credibility of physicians involved in treatment and to develop educational activities and consensus guidelines.
