= Thomas Coughlin III =

Thomas A. Coughlin III

New York State Commissioner of Correctional Services
- In office 1979–1994
- Preceded by: Richard Hongisto
- Succeeded by: John A. Lyons

New York State Commissioner of Mental Retardation and Developmental Disabilities
- In office 1975–1979
- Preceded by: Position established
- Succeeded by: James E. Introne

Personal details
- Born: February 12, 1938 Brooklyn, New York, U.S.
- Died: August 23, 2001 (aged 63) Syracuse, New York, U.S.
- Education: Goddard College

Thomas Coughlin III (February 12, 1938 – August 23, 2001) was the first commissioner of the New York State Office of Mental Retardation and Developmental Disabilities (now Office for People with Developmental Disabilities) and later served as the second longest commissioner of the New York State Department of Correctional Services. He was originally appointed by former Governor Hugh Carey as deputy commissioner for mental retardation in the New York State Department of Mental Hygiene in 1975.

== Early life ==
Born in Brooklyn on February 12, 1938, the son of a firefighter, he grew up in Flatbush and attended Midwood High School. He volunteered for the Air Force and was stationed in Watertown, N.Y., where he married and later resided and served as a New York state trooper. He graduated from Goddard College in Vermont in 1972, and briefly studied law at Syracuse University.

== People with Developmental Disabilities ==
The Coughlins' third daughter was born with developmental disabilities, and in 1964 he founded the Jefferson County Association for Retarded Children to press for better state facilities for people with intellectual disabilities. After joining the Department of Mental Hygiene, Coughlin became instrumental in implementing the Willowbrook Consent Decree which committed New York state to improving community placement for all developmentally disabled.

== Corrections and Community Supervision ==
Mr. Coughlin took over the Department of Corrections when State Senate Republicans blocked the selection of Governor Carey's original nominee for the job, Richard Hongisto. He continued to serve in the post under Governor Mario Cuomo, where Mr. Coughlin presided over the rapid growth of the prison system. There were about 21,000 inmates when he took over in 1979 and almost 67,000 when he retired after 15 years.

== Stock Car Racing ==
Coughlin enjoyed driving stock cars, competing for several years at the Watertown Speedway. In 1972 he joined the race track's promotional team, and in 1975 Coughlin and his partners purchased the Can-Am Speedway in nearby LaFargeville, N.Y. Coughlin, along with fellow area promoters Howard Rowe, Doug Atkinson and Bob Thurston were honored in 1996 by the Northeast Dirt Modified Hall of Fame for their contributions.
