= National Institute on Alcohol Abuse and Alcoholism =

U.S. health institute

Coordinates: 39.0481°N 77.1206°W

National Institute on Alcohol Abuse and Alcoholism (NIAAA)
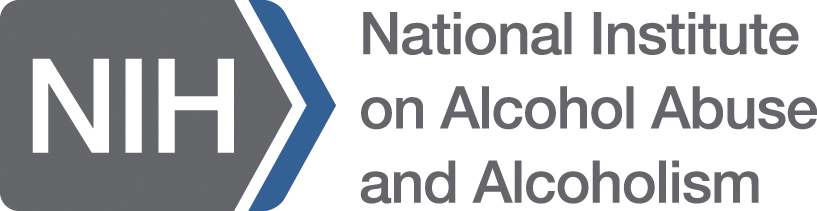

Agency overview
- Formed: December 31, 1970; 55 years ago
- Jurisdiction: Federal Government of the United States
- Agency executive: Dr. George F. Koob, Director
- Parent department: Department of Health and Human Services
- Parent agency: National Institutes of Health
- Website: www.niaaa.nih.gov

Former logo

The National Institute on Alcohol Abuse and Alcoholism (NIAAA), as part of the U.S. National Institutes of Health, supports and conducts biomedical and behavioural research on the causes, consequences, treatment, and prevention of alcoholism and alcohol-related problems. The NIAAA functions both as a funding agency that supports research by external research institutions and as a research institution itself, where alcohol research is carried out in‐house. It funds approximately 90% of all such research in the United States. The NIAAA publishes the academic journal Alcohol Research: Current Reviews.

== Past directors ==
Past directors from 1972–present

No.	Portrait	Director	Took office	Left office	Refs.
1		Morris E. Chafetz	1972	September 1, 1975	
2		Ernest Noble	February 1976	April 1978	
acting		Loran Archer	April 1978	April 1979	
3		John R. DeLuca	May 1979	October 1981	
acting		Loran Archer	November 1981	July 1982	
acting		William E. Mayer	August 1982	July 1983	
4		Robert G. Niven	August 1983	December 1985	
acting		Loran Archer	January 1986	October 1986	
5		Enoch Gordis	November 1986	January 2002	
acting		Raynard S. Kington	January 2002	November 2002	
6		Ting-Kai Li	November 2002	October 2008	
acting		Kenneth R. Warren	November 2008	January 2014	
7		George Koob	January 27, 2014	Present	

== Mission ==
The mission of the National Institute on Alcohol Abuse and Alcoholism is to generate and disseminate fundamental knowledge about the effects of alcohol on health and well-being, and apply that knowledge to improve diagnosis, prevention, and treatment of alcohol-related problems, including alcohol use disorder, across the lifespan.

NIAAA provides leadership in the national effort to reduce alcohol-related problems by:

- Conducting and supporting alcohol-related research in a wide range of scientific areas including genetics, neuroscience, epidemiology, prevention, and treatment.
- Coordinating and collaborating with other research institutes and Federal Programs on alcohol-related issues.
- Collaborating with international, national, state, and local institutions, organizations, agencies, and programs engaged in alcohol-related work.
- Translating and disseminating research findings to health care providers, researchers, policymakers, and the public.

== Extramural research ==
Extramural research is research conducted by organizations outside the NIH with NIH support through grants, contracts, or cooperative agreements. NIAAA’s extramural research includes both clinical and basic science research.

Clinical research comprises more than 30 percent of NIAAA’s extramural research and includes programs in:

- Prevention (Neo-prohibitionism)
- Treatment
- Health Services

The laboratories and researchers housed within NIAAA seek to unravel the biological basis of alcohol use disorders and related problems and to develop new strategies to prevent and treat these disorders.

== See also ==
- Project MATCH, an initialism for: Matching Alcoholism Treatments to Client Heterogeneity
