= ABMRF/The Foundation for Alcohol Research =

Non-profit organization

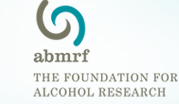
- Founded: 1982
- Purpose: Alcohol Research, Moderate Drinking, Biomedical, Behavioral and Social, Public Health, Young Investigators
- Location: Baltimore, Maryland
- Region served: Research on the Effects of Alcohol on Health and Behavior
- Method: Grantmaking
- Website: www.abmrf.org

ABMRF/The Foundation for Alcohol Research is a private, non-profit foundation supporting young investigators researching the effects of alcohol on health and behavior. The Foundation's mission is "To achieve a better understanding of the effects of alcohol on the health and behavior of individuals; To provide the scientific basis for the prevention, treatment and future cure of alcohol-use disorders; To fund innovative, high quality research; To support promising new investigators; To share information with the research community and other interested parties." Innovative studies on the effects of alcohol consumption are approved annually by independent advisory committees, with grants being awarded to institutions in the United States, Canada and South Africa. Over 260 institutions and more than 570 grantees in the United States, Canada and South Africa have been awarded grants since ABMRF's founding in 1982, amounting to nearly $43 million in grant funding. The Foundation encourages open communication of research through peer-reviewed scientific journals and research conferences without any foundation review or approval, aiming for quality and independence in science. To date, ABMRF grantees have amassed more than 2,350 articles, book chapters or scientific presentations based upon Foundation-funded research.

== History ==
ABMRF was founded in 1982 as the Alcoholic Beverage Medical Research Foundation (ABMRF). Prior to its founding, ABMRF's predecessor organization was the Medical Advisory Group (MAG). Formed in 1969 under the administrative auspices of Johns Hopkins University School of Medicine, the MAG was created to provide independent medical information on the health effects of alcoholic beverages and prevention of alcohol abuse to members of the brewing industry. The MAG was an esteemed council of physicians from the Johns Hopkins School of Medicine, Harvard University, Yale University and Dartmouth College. The MAG merged with a similar group in Canada, the Health Advisory Group. At this point, the Foundation became independent of Johns Hopkins and the Alcoholic Beverage Medical Research Foundation was formed,aiming to ensure independence from its financial contributors. Evaluating and recommending applications for research grants became the primary focus. Emphasis was placed on prevention rather than treatment, concentrating on short- and long-term effects of moderate drinking, why a minority of drinkers move beyond moderate to excessive intake, and prevention of alcohol misuse. These effects could be not only medical but also social and behavioral, so two advisory committees were born: the Medical and Biomedical Advisory Council and the Behavioral and Social Advisory Council. All grant applications were to be peer-reviewed by a team of highly respected individuals serving on these councils.

== Leadership ==
Currently, the Foundation is led by Dr. Mack C. Mitchell Jr., who was selected to serve as president in 1989 and also serves as Vice Chairman of Internal Medicine at University of Texas Southwestern Medical School. The board of trustees is chaired by Bruce M. Ambler, M.B.A., retired president and chief executive officer of Constellation Holdings.

The Medical and Biomedical Advisory Council (MBAC) reviews applications in the biological, physiological and clinical sciences. The chair of the Medical and Biomedical Advisory Council is Dr. Laura E. Nagy, professor of molecular medicine at Cleveland Clinic and former ABMRF grantee. The Behavioral and Social Advisory Council (BSAC) reviews applications in the behavioral and social sciences. The BSAC is led by Dr. Kim Fromme, professor of psychology and director of Studies on Alcohol, Health and Risky Activities Lab at University of Texas at Austin and former ABMRF grantee. A team of leaders in the alcohol research community serve along with the chairs of the advisory councils to select investigators from academic and scientific institutions for an ABMRF grant award.

Prior to Dr. Mitchell's tenure, Dr. Thomas B. Turner, ABMRF's founder, served as president from 1982 - 1989. The first chairman of the Behavioral and Social Advisory Council was Dr. Alex Richman, chairman and professor of psychiatry and preventive medicine at Dalhousie University, and Dr. Brian MacMahon, professor and head of the department of epidemiology at the Harvard School of Public Health, chaired the Medical and Biomedical Advisory Council.

== Grants Program ==
The Foundation for Alcohol Research supports scientific studies on the use and prevention of alcohol abuse. Promising young investigators at institutions in the United States, Canada and South Africa are eligible for funding. Young investigators should be independent, faculty members, who are either new to the field or a trained researcher beginning a new line of research. Nearly 75% of the grant awards go to researchers in instructor or assistant professor positions.

The Foundation accepts applications for grants to conduct research on important aspects of alcohol consumption and its effects. Of greatest importance to the Foundation are the transitions in drinking patterns and behavior; health effects of moderate alcohol use; behavioral and biomedical effects of alcohol, and biobehavioral studies on the etiology of alcohol misuse.

Grant awards are a maximum of $75,000 for each of two years, for a total of $150,000 for the two-year project.

== Criticism ==
ABMRF has faced some criticism for its ties to the alcohol industry and possible conflicts of interest, as the organization receives funding from American and Canadian brewing companies. Addiction researcher Thomas F. Babor writes that this organization "attempts specifically to fund research on ‘industry-favorable’ topics such as the health benefits of moderate drinking." While the ABMRF does work to separate funding sources from influencing grantees, researchers who receive industry funding are known to be substantially more likely to reach positive results about the effects of alcohol on human health.
