= Coerced abstinence =

Drug rehabilitation technique

Coerced abstinence is a drug rehabilitation strategy which uses frequent monitoring and immediate punishment to reduce drug use among participants. This strategy can dramatically reduce recidivism rates among chronic drug users, especially those on probation and parole. Most probation agreements mandate drug treatment, but a coerced abstinence program mandates only abstinence which is enforced through regular, predictable drug testing. Under this system, failed tests swiftly result in a brief period of incarceration – usually for a few days. This policy option is advocated by a crime policy expert Mark A. R. Kleiman.

== Theory ==
Currently, most drug courts require defendants to attend drug treatment and to return to court periodically and report progress to a judge. The extent of progress influences later sentencing. These programs are often not available to serious offenders. Drug court programs place as much emphasis on program attendance as they do on abstinence. Because these programs have limited resources and the focus is treatment rather than abstinence, many in treatment can merely estimate the likelihood of being tested and then choose to take the risk of continued use. Although the penalty for getting caught is quite high, the chances of being tested are usually quite low.

Behavior in the face of risks tends to follow what is known in psychology as prospect theory; People tend to be more averse to harms which are certain than more severe harms which are merely probable. According to Prospect Theory, coerced abstinence is effective at getting people off drugs because the frequency and certainty of a sentence is a much more significant deterrent than severity of the sentence. In other words, if virtually every time probationers fail a drug test, they go immediately to jail (even for just a few days) probationers will use less drugs than if they are only occasionally caught even if the penalty is significantly higher.

One problem with implementing a coerced abstinence program is that initially the scope of the program must be sufficiently small to track down those who do not show up for tests. Probation officers are already overworked and police do not make warrant service a high priority. Designing a good program is quite difficult since sanctions must be swift and sure. Another problem with coerced abstinence is the political feasibility. Because the program ascribes neither to the disease model of addiction (which requires drug treatment) nor to a morality-based model (which mandates long and hard sentencing), it may simply be too ideologically neutral to be a successful part of a political platform.

== Programs using coerced abstinence ==
The Hawaii State Judiciary has implemented a probation program which relies on the theory of coerced abstinence called H.O.P.E. (Hawaii's Opportunity Probation with Enforcement). The program has achieved promising results among paroles with a history of methamphetamine use and inspired other pilot programs in the United States. Evaluations of H.O.P.E. indicate that participants spend on average 130 fewer days in prison than participants in traditional community supervision programs.

== See also ==
- Sober Coach
- Sober living environment
- Drug policy of the Soviet Union
- Psychology
