= American Academy of Addiction Psychiatry =

Accredited Continuing Medical Education and organization

The American Academy for Addiction Psychiatry (AAAP) is a professional organization and an accredited Continuing Medical Education (CME) provider, based in East Providence, Rhode Island, USA. Its members are specialists in addiction psychiatry and other health care professionals who treat patients with addictions. AAAP provides medical education programs in the field of addiction psychiatry.

== History ==
The AAAP was founded in 1985. It was originally called the American Academy of Psychiatrists in Alcoholism and Addiction; the name was changed in 1996.

=== Activities ===
As well as its educational programs, the organization provides information about treatment and support organizations and rehabilitation programs to families and individuals dealing with addiction. It also works with government organizations and sponsors addiction treatment programs. The organization's official peer-reviewed journal, The American Journal on Addictions, is published bimonthly by John Wiley & Sons.

The AAAP conducts and reports studies related to substance abuse. The organization also advocates for funding for addiction treatment and research programs.

AAAP holds an annual meeting at which presentations and poster sessions are held.

=== Special Projects ===
AAAP administers two three-year grants funded by the Substance Abuse and Mental Health Services Administration. One funds a training and mentoring project which educates health professionals about the use and misuse of opioids for treatment of chronic pain and about opioid dependence treatment. It is operated by a group of stakeholder organizations, including AAAP.

The second grant funds the Providers' Clinical Support System for Medically Assisted Treatment (PCSS-MAT), a project led by AAAP in conjunction with other healthcare professional organizations. It provides training and resources to help prescribers and health care providers keep up to date with information about medication-assisted treatment of opioid addiction.

AAAP also directs a grant from the Agency for Healthcare Research and Quality (AHRQ) which uses social media platforms to inform and assist physicians who are completing their Maintenance of Certification (MOC) Performance in Practice.
