= Pharmacology Biochemistry and Behavior =

- Discipline: Behavioral pharmacology
- Language: English
- Edited by: Guy Griebel

Publication details
- History: 1973-present
- Publisher: Elsevier
- Frequency: Monthly
- Impact factor: 2.781 (2014)

Standard abbreviations
- ISO 4: Pharmacol. Biochem. Behav.

Indexing
- CODEN: PBBHAU
- ISSN: 0091-3057
- LCCN: 73644949
- OCLC no.: 848182005

Links
- Journal homepage; Online archive

Pharmacology Biochemistry and Behavior is a monthly peer-reviewed scientific journal covering behavioral pharmacology. It was established in 1973 and is published by Elsevier. The editor-in-chief is Guy Griebel (Sanofi).

== Abstracting and indexing ==
The journal is abstracted and indexed in:

- BIOSIS Previews
- Current Contents/Life Sciences
- EMBASE
- ETOH
- Elsevier BIOBASE
- PubMed/MEDLINE
- Science Citation Index
- Scopus

According to the Journal Citation Reports, the journal has a 2014 impact factor of 2.781.
