= Government of New York (state) =

Government of the U.S. state of New York

- Logo of the New York government Great Seal of the State of New York
- Polity type: Presidential republic Federated state
- Constitution: Constitution of New York

Legislative branch
- Name: New York State Legislature
- Type: Bicameral
- Meeting place: New York State Capitol
- Upper house
- Name: Senate
- Presiding officer: Antonio Delgado, President
- Lower house
- Name: Assembly
- Presiding officer: Carl Heastie, Speaker

Executive branch
- Head of state and government
- Title: Governor
- Currently: Kathy Hochul
- Appointer: Election
- Cabinet
- Name: Cabinet
- Leader: Governor
- Deputy leader: Lieutenant Governor
- Headquarters: New York State Capitol

Judicial branch
- Name: New York State Unified Court System
- Courts: Courts of New York
- New York Court of Appeals
- Chief judge: Rowan Wilson
- Seat: New York Court of Appeals Building, Albany

The government of the State of New York, headquartered at the New York State Capitol in Albany, encompasses the administrative structure of the US state of New York, as established by the state's constitution. Analogously to the US federal government, it is composed of three branches: executive, legislative, and judicial. The head of the executive is the governor. The legislature consists of the Senate and the Assembly. The Unified Court System consists of the Court of Appeals and lower courts. The state is also divided into counties, cities, towns, and villages, which are all municipal corporations with their own government.

== Executive ==
The elected executive officers are:

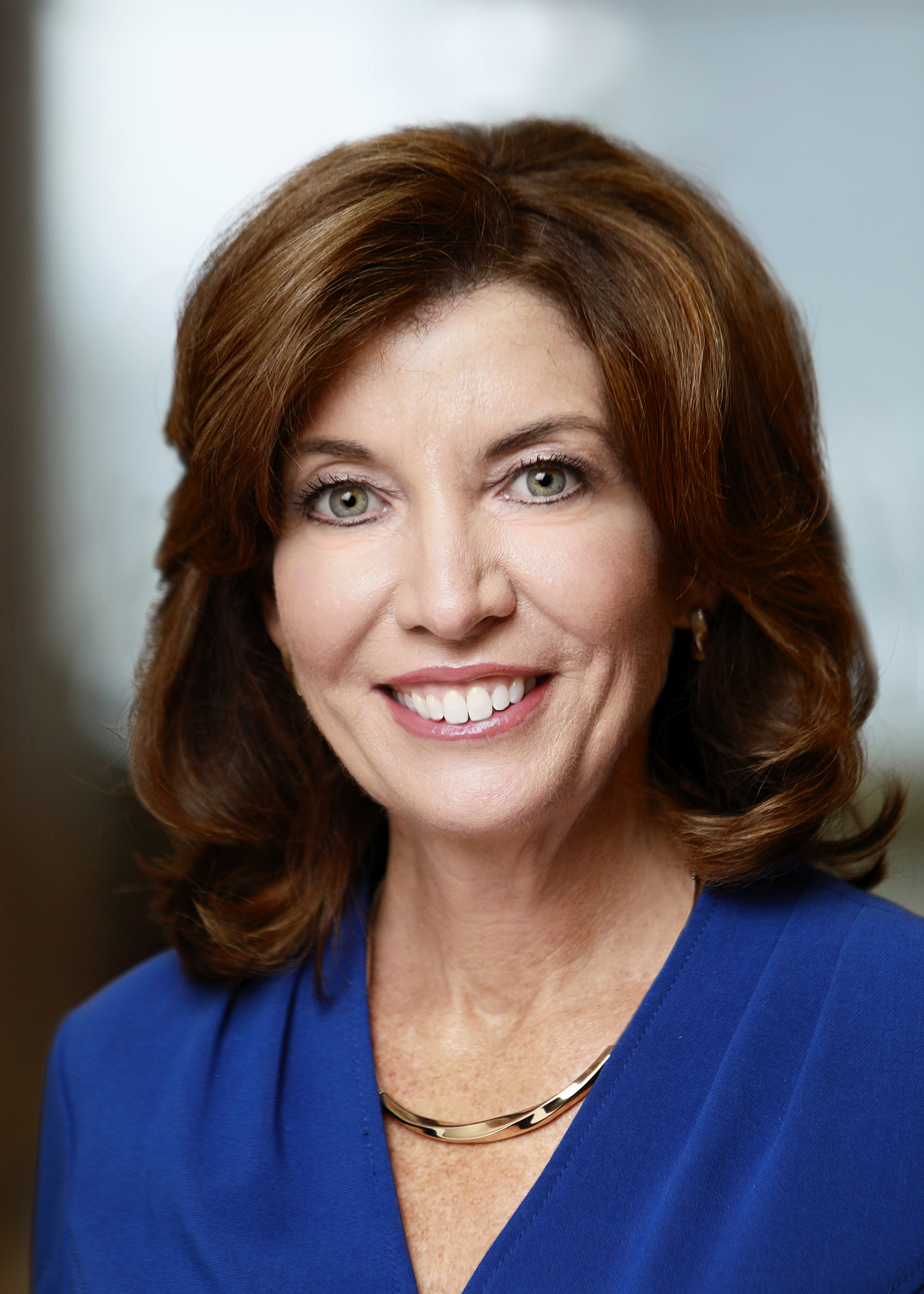
Kathy Hochul (D)
Governor

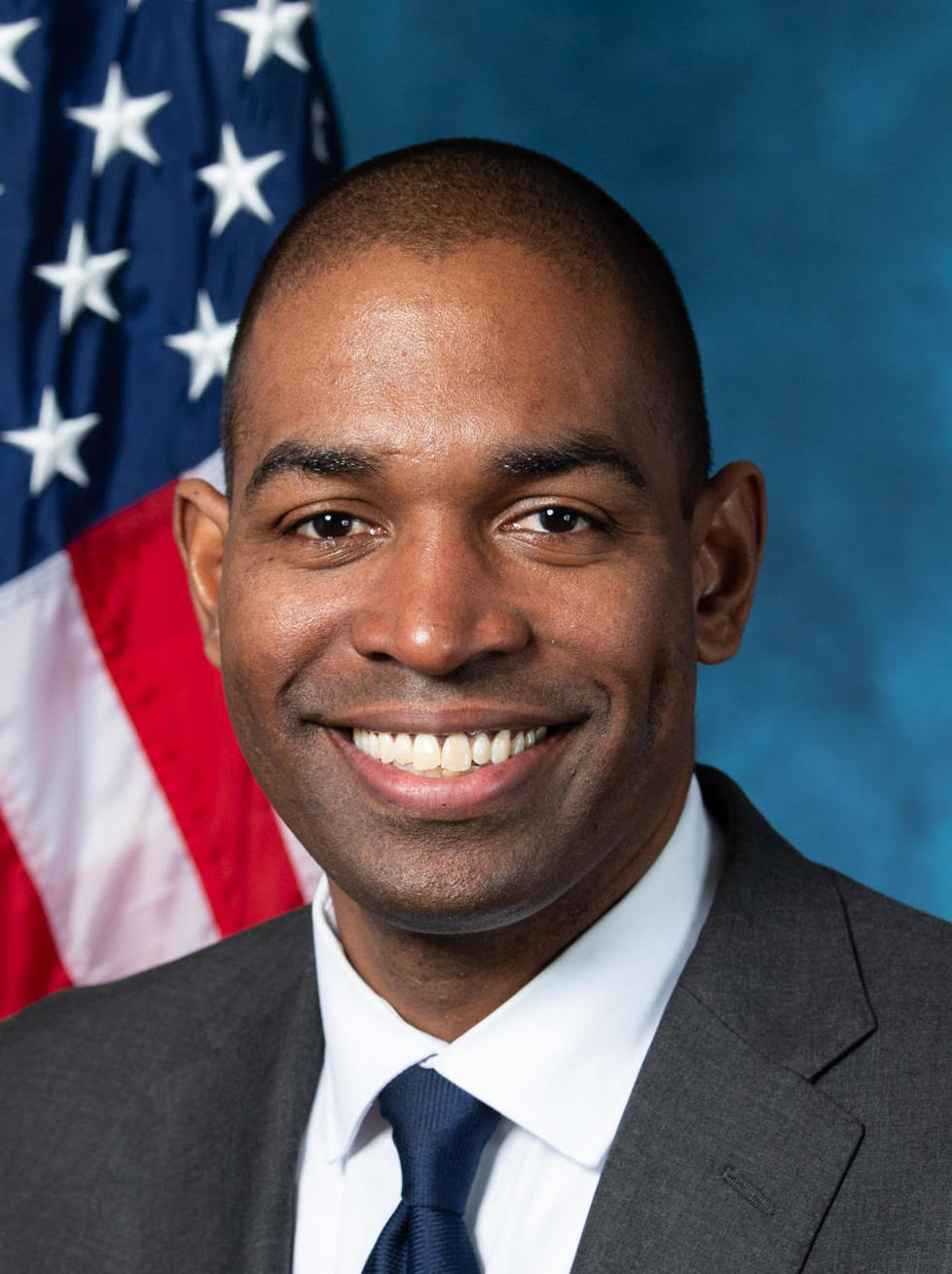
Antonio Delgado (D)
Lieutenant Governor

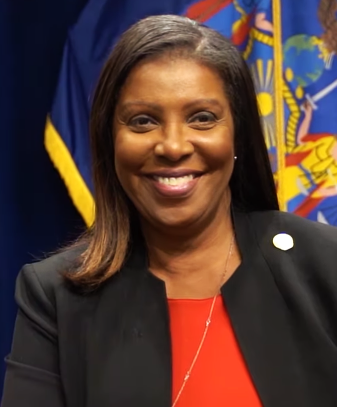
Letitia James (D)
Attorney General

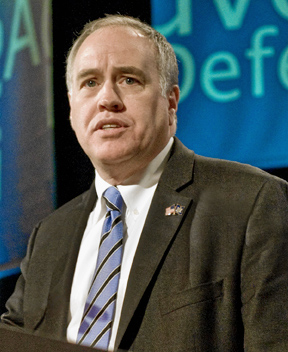
Tom DiNapoli (D)
Comptroller

There are several (limited to twenty) state government departments:

- Department of Agriculture and Markets
- Department of Audit and Control
- Department of Civil Service
- Department of Corrections and Community Supervision
- Department of Economic Development
- Education Department
- Department of Environmental Conservation
- Executive Department
- Department of Family Assistance
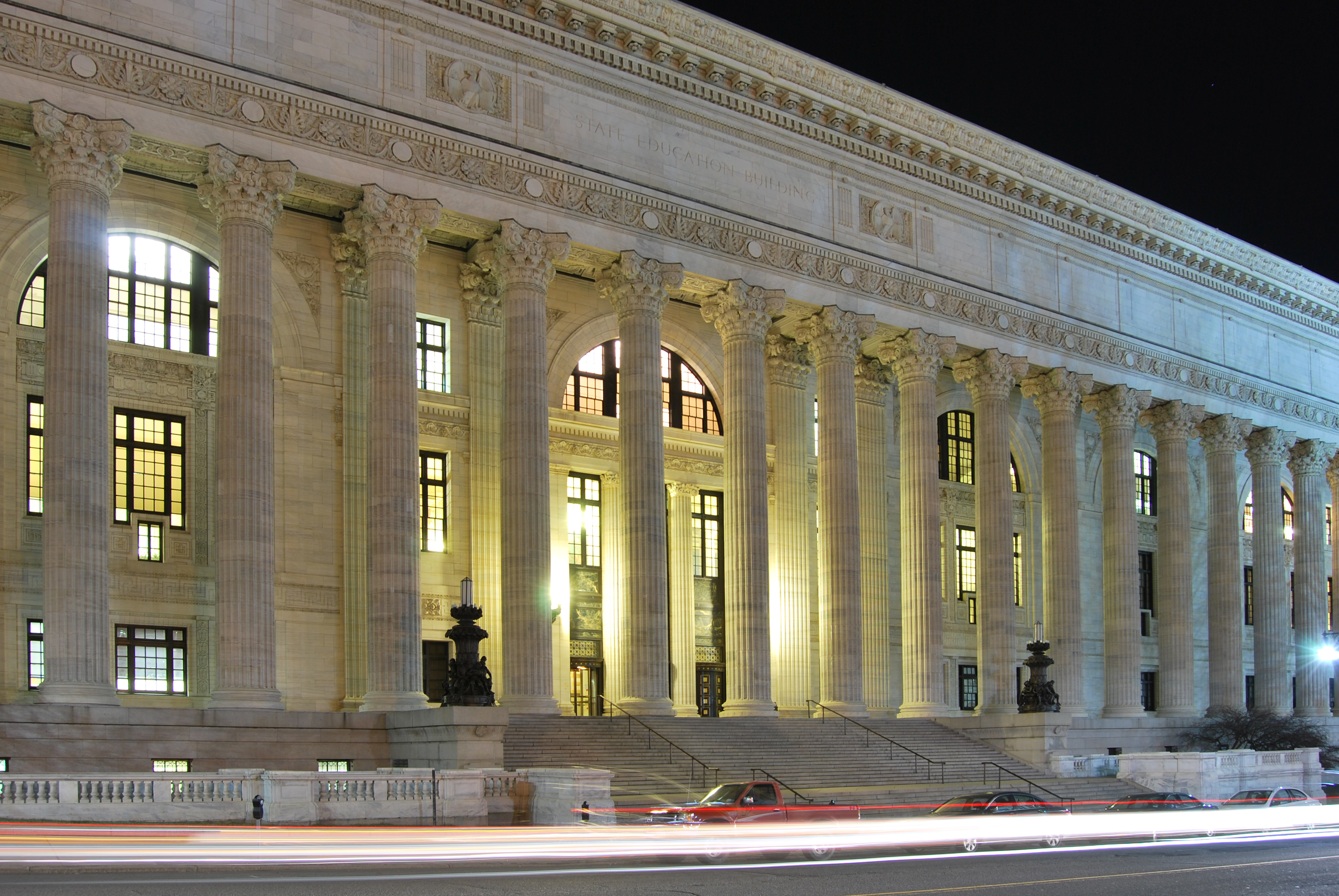
  The State Education Building in Albany
  - Office of Children and Family Services
  - Office of Temporary and Disability Assistance
- Department of Financial Services
- Department of Health
- Department of Labor
- Department of Law
- Department of Mental Hygiene
  - Office of Addiction Services and Supports
  - Office of Mental Health
  - Office for People With Developmental Disabilities
- Department of Motor Vehicles
- Department of Public Service
- Department of State
- Department of Taxation and Finance
- Department of Transportation
- Department of Veterans' Services

Regulations are promulgated and published in the New York State Register and compiled in the New York Codes, Rules and Regulations (NYCRR). There are also numerous decisions, opinions, and rulings of state agencies.

== Legislature ==
The New York State Legislature is bicameral and consists of the New York State Senate and the New York State Assembly. The Assembly consists of 150 members; the Senate varies in its number of members, but currently has 63. The Assembly is headed by the speaker; the Senate is headed by the president, a post held ex officio by the lieutenant governor, who only has a tie-breaking "casting vote", but more often it is presided over by the temporary president or by a senator of the majority leader's choosing.

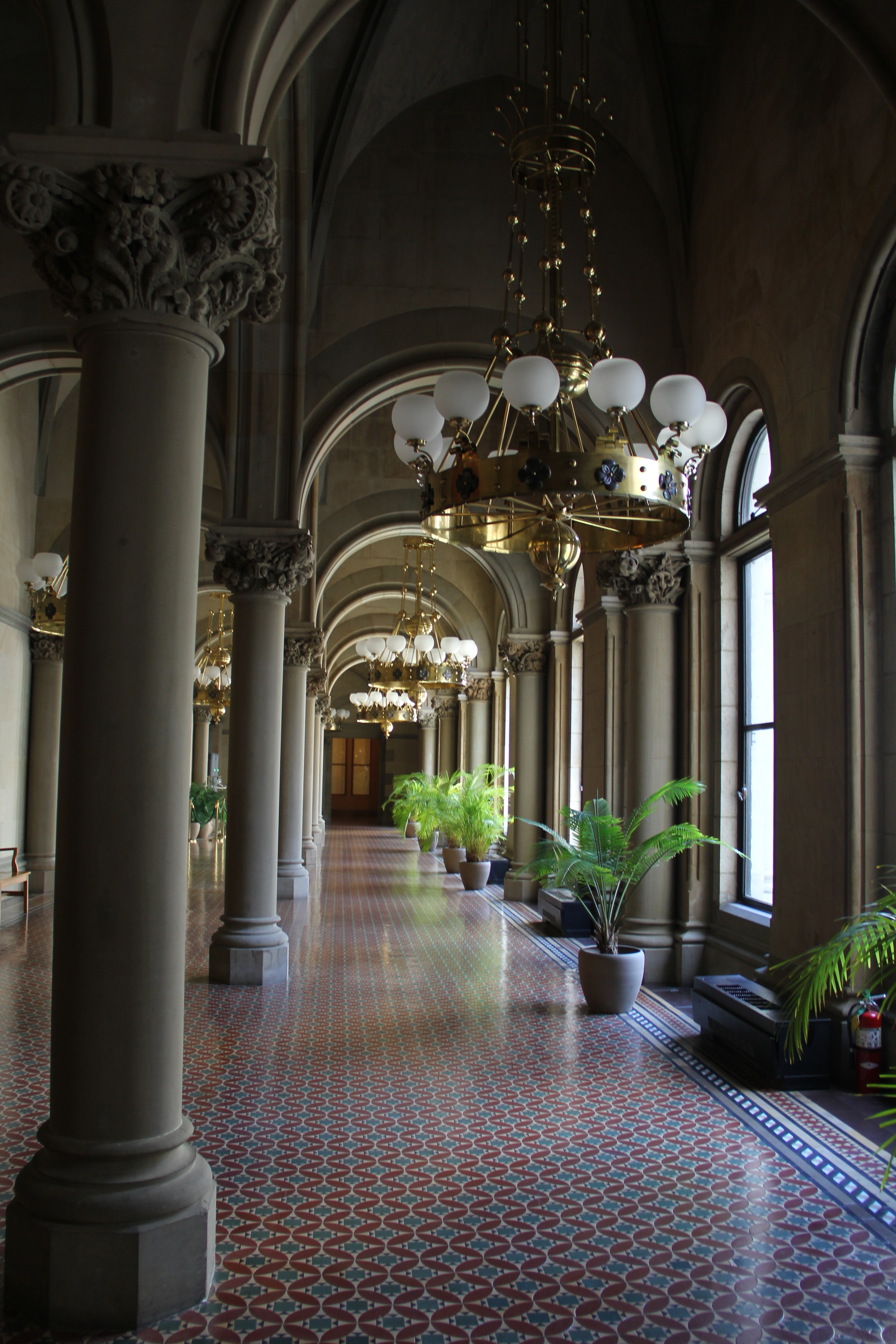
A hallway alongside the upper floor of the New York State Senate chamber, where public viewing galleries are accessible

The Legislature is empowered to make laws, subject to the governor's power to veto a bill. However, the veto may be overridden by the Legislature if there is a two-thirds majority in favor of overriding in each House. Furthermore, it has the power to propose amendments to the New York Constitution by a majority vote and then another majority vote following an election. If so proposed, the amendment becomes valid if agreed to by the voters at a referendum. The session laws are published in the official Laws of New York. The permanent laws of a general nature are codified in the Consolidated Laws of New York.

=== Session ===
The New York State Assembly Legislative session is a cycle that takes place from the first month of the year up until a budget has been published by both houses. According to the New York State Legislative Calendar, session convenes January 9th throughout June 19th. Budget deadline is the last week of March, but historically it has dragged on 'til the month of August and can even surpass that if the Senate and the Assembly fails to compromise. During session both houses work both together and independently to introduce bills and propose changes or support for the governor's executive budget.

During the legislative session for both houses (Senate and Assembly):

1. Bills are introduced and voted on to become law or not
2. Resolutions/Proclamations are adopted
3. Changes to the governor's Executive Budget are proclaimed

== Judiciary ==
The New York State Unified Court System interprets and applies the law of New York, ensures equal justice under law, and provides a mechanism for dispute resolution. The court system in New York tends to produce mild confusion for outsiders. In general, the judicial system is composed of the trial courts, consisting of the superior courts and the local courts, and the appellate courts.

The appellate courts are the:

- Court of Appeals
- Appellate Division of the Supreme Court
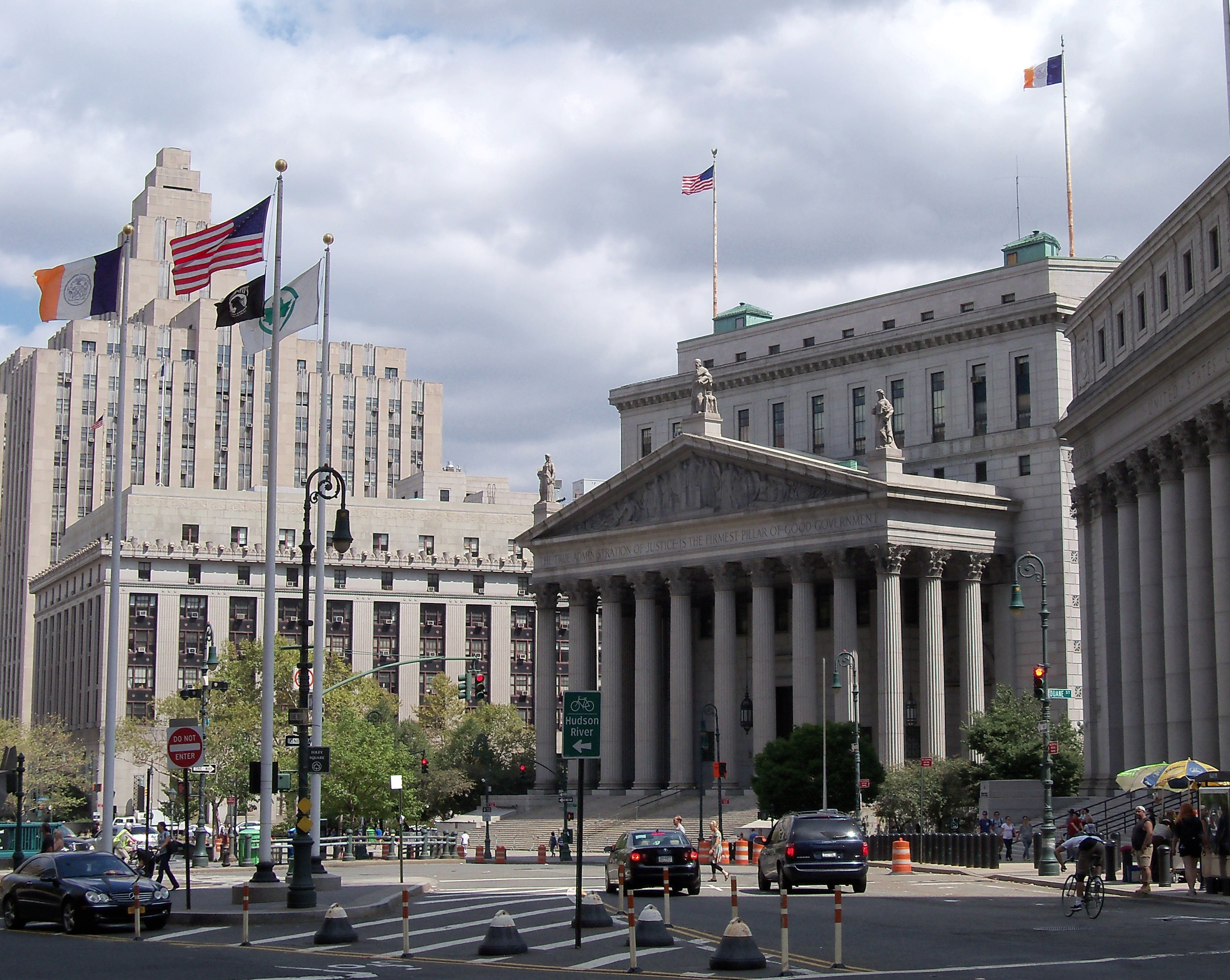
  The New York County Courthouse in Manhattan
- appellate terms of the Supreme Court
- appellate sessions of the County Court

The superior courts are the:

- Supreme Court
- County Court
- Family Court
- Surrogate's Court
- Court of Claims

And the local courts:

- NYC Criminal Court and NYC Civil Court
- District Court outside New York City
- City courts outside New York City
- justice courts (town and village courts)

The highest court of appeal is the Court of Appeals (instead of the "Supreme Court") whereas the primary felony trial court is the County Court (or the Supreme Court in New York City). The Supreme Court also acts as the intermediate appellate court for many cases, and the local courts handle a variety of other matters and are the starting point for all criminal cases. The New York City courts make up the largest local court system. The system is administered by the chief judge of the Court of Appeals, also known as the chief judge of New York, the chief administrative judge, the Office of Court Administration and other agencies.

== Local government ==
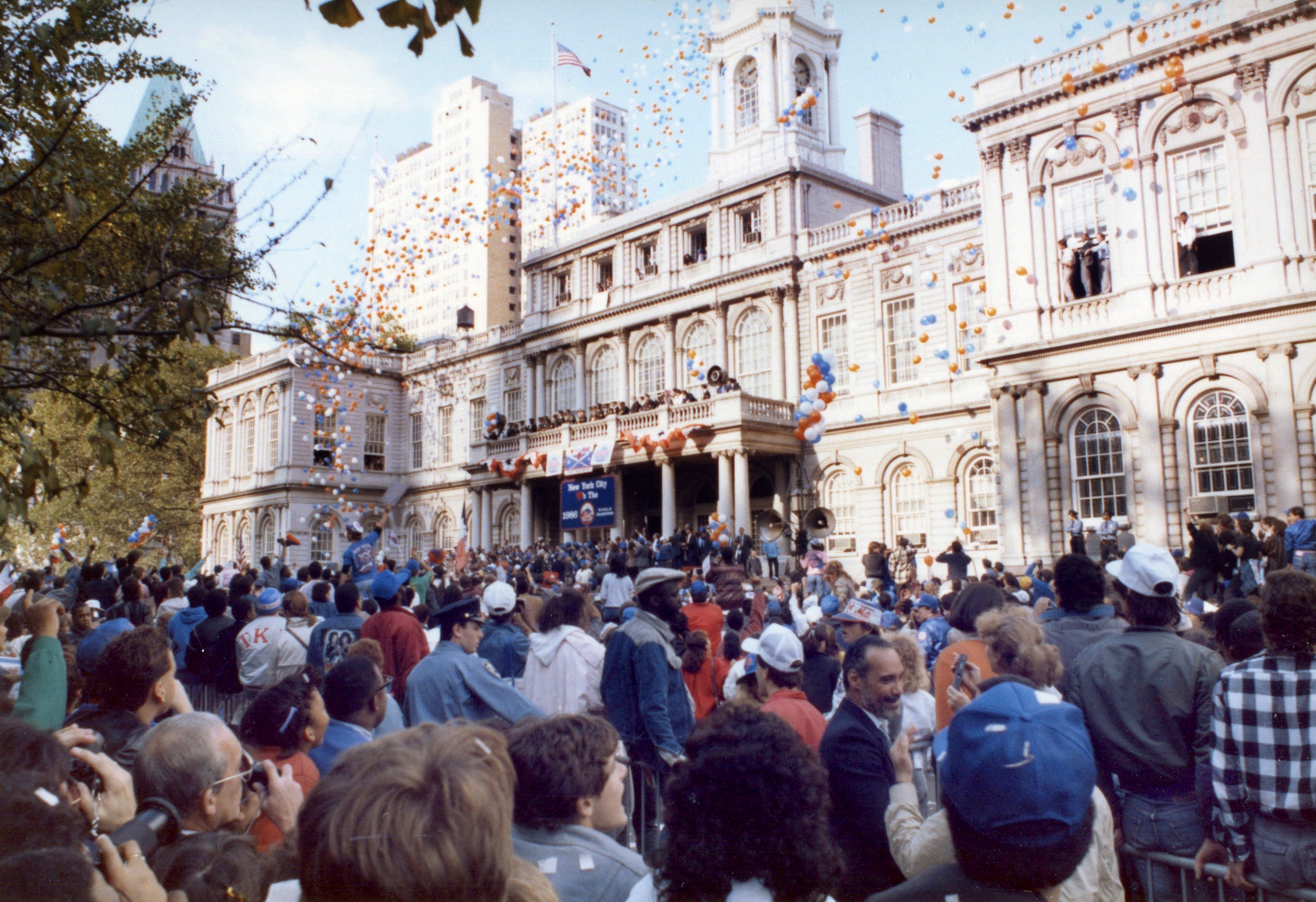
An event outside New York City Hall in Manhattan

The state is divided into counties, cities, towns, and villages, which are all municipal corporations with their own government that provide most local government services. Whether a municipality is defined as a city, town, or village is not dependent on population or land area, but rather by the form of government selected by the residents and approved by the New York State Legislature. Each such government is granted varying home rule powers as provided by the New York Constitution, and a local law has a status equivalent with a law enacted by the Legislature (subject to certain exceptions and restrictions). New York also has various corporate entities that serve single purposes that are also local governments, such as school and fire districts as well as New York state public-benefit corporations, frequently known as authorities or development corporations. New York has 62 counties, which are subdivided into 932 towns and 62 cities; it also has 10 Indian reservations. In total, the state has over 3400 active local governments and over 4200 taxing jurisdictions.

In 1898, when New York City was consolidated into its present form, all previous town and county governments within it were abolished in favor of the present five boroughs and unified, centralized city government (the New York City government).

== Other governments ==
=== Tribal government ===
Native Americans' governments are significantly independent of the state and its local governments. New York cannot interfere with tribal self-government, but may regulate conduct on tribal territory concerning non-Native Americans. For example, federal law forbids states and local authorities to tax Indian lands; however, the state can and does tax sales of cigarettes to non-tribe members on tribal territory.

== See also ==
- Politics of New York (state)
- Elections in New York
- Law of New York
- New York State Common Retirement

== General and cited references ==
- Local Government Handbook (PDF) (6th ed.). New York State Department of State. 2009. Archived from the original (PDF) on January 13, 2016.
- Gibson, Ellen M.; Manz, William H. (2004). Gibson's New York Legal Research Guide (PDF) (3rd ed.). Wm. S. Hein Publishing. ISBN 1-57588-728-2. LCCN 2004042477. OCLC 54455036.
