= American Society of Addiction Medicine =

Professional medical society

American Society of Addiction Medicine (ASAM)
- Formation: 1954
- Type: Professional association
- Legal status: 501(c)(3)
- Headquarters: Rockville, Maryland
- Location: United States
- Members: 8,000
- President: Stephen M. Taylor
- Executive Vice President and Chief Executive Officer: Julia L. Chang: CEO/Executive Vice President
- Website: www.asam.org

The American Society of Addiction Medicine (ASAM), founded in 1954, is a professional medical society representing over 8,000 physicians, clinicians, and associated professionals in the field of addiction medicine. ASAM is dedicated to increasing access and improving the quality of addiction treatment, educating physicians and the public, supporting research and prevention, and promoting the appropriate role of physicians in the care of patients with addiction.

== ASAM Criteria ==
ASAM publishes recommendations and standards for the assessment, placement, and treatment of substance use disorders. They look at six dimensions:

1. Intoxication, Withdrawal, and Addiction Medicines
2. Biomedical Conditions
3. Psychiatric and Cognitive Conditions
4. Substance Use Related Risks (formerly "Relapse Potential")
5. Recovery Environment Interactions
6. Person-Centered Considerations

== Continuum of Care ==
ASAM defines a continuum of care with multiple levels where someone could receive treatment. The continuum of care is intended to be bi-directional and person-centered rather than program-centered, so someone could theoretically stay for a given length of time at level 3.7 and then drop down to level 1.0; they could then freely go back up or down as needed, according to their own multidimensional concerns. This is in contrast to historically program-driven treatment, where patients would be expected to complete a set number of days and then step down to the next level and complete that as well, regardless of their personal needs or severity of symptoms.

The current levels of care range from: Level 1 - Outpatient; Level 2- IOP/HIOP; Level 3 - Residential; Level 4 - Inpatient.

== Recognition ==
ASAM is currently used to inform public policy of addiction medicine in 45 US states.

== See also ==
- New York State Office of Addiction Services and Supports
