= Charles Lawrence (mathematician) =

American mathematician

- Education: Rensselaer Polytechnic Institute; Cornell University
- Known for: Bayesian Statistics; Computational Molecular Biology; Statistical Inferences in discrete high-D spaces
- Scientific career
- Fields: Bioinformatics; Applied mathematics
- Workplaces: Wadsworth Center; Brown University

Charles "Chip" Lawrence is an American bioinformatician and mathematician, and pioneer in developing novel statistical approaches to biological sequence analysis.

After his PhD graduation, Lawrence was Assistant Professor at the Rensselaer Polytechnic Institute, a consultant to the Ministry of Maternal and Child Health in the Dominican Republic, Director of Operations Research and Statistics in Epidemiology at the New York State Department of Health, Chief of the Bioinformatics Laboratory at the Wadsworth Center, and Research Professor at the Rensselaer Polytechnic Institute.

He currently is Professor of Applied Mathematics and Center for computational Molecular Biology, at Brown University. From 2004 to 2006, he was the director of the Center for Computational Biology, and is now the director of the Statistical Molecular Biology Group (SMBG) at Brown University.

Lawrence's key scientific works to date are focusing on algorithmic approaches to biological sequence analysis. He was one of the first to recognize that the inherent statistical nature of genomic processes and the immense data resulting from genomic sequencing projects could only be fully analyzed by using statistical algorithms.

== Early life and education ==
Lawrence got his bachelor's degree in 1967, at the Rensselaer Polytechnic Institute, majoring in physics. After graduation, he pursued further education at Cornell University and moved to another research field: Applied Operation Research and Statistics in Environmental Engineering. He finished his PhD in 1971. His dissertation topic is population dynamics. Lawrence switched to bioinformatics after he finished his PhD study.

== Research interests and contributions ==
Since the 1980s, Lawrence has been a pioneer in the field of computational biology, developing novel statistical and algorithmic approaches to biological sequence analysis.

=== Gibbs sampling in motif finding ===
Lawrence has particular contributions in the development of sequence alignment algorithms, which is approaching the motif finding problem by employing Bayesian statistics and the Gibbs sampling strategy. Lawrence collaborated with others to develop Bayesian statistical approaches to RNA secondary structure prediction, employing a full ensemble of probable structures that an RNA molecule may adopt.

Generally, Lawrence researches the application of Bayesian algorithms, specifically in the statistical approaches for the understanding of biological problems, with particular interest in transcription regulation and identification of regulatory motifs in sequences, antisense oligonucleotide and siRNA design, comparative genomics, the composition of nucleotide sequences and detailed analyses of several protein families.

=== Software and platforms ===
In the past several years, based on the statistical algorithm development by Lawrence and his collaborators, several programs have also been publicly available and widely used, such as the Gibbs Motif Sampler, the Bayes aligner, Sfold, BALSA, Gibbs Gaussian Clustering, and Bayesian Motif Clustering. His work in Bayesian Statistics won the Mitchell Prize for outstanding applied Bayesian statistics paper in 2000.

=== Chip Lawrence Lab ===
Lawrence became the director of Chip Lawrence Lab at Brown University. Their work is more focused on the applications of high-D inferences in biological problems such as the finding regulatory motifs, RNA secondary-structure prediction, and genome-wide studies of epigenetics. His research interests include the geoscience areas of change-point estimators of paleoclimate records and probabilistic alignment of geological stratigraphic sequences. The application models of stochastic grammars are also studied in Chip Lawrence Lab.

== Teaching and traineeship ==
Lawrence has also devoted time to education.

He developed a tutorial on Bayesian statistics and Gibbs sampling, as well as the introduction courses in Bayesian statistics at Brown University.

Lawrence has mentored several young investigators before he took the job at Brown University. From 1981 to 2003, he worked as the Chief in Wadsworth Center for Laboratories and Research, New York State Department of Health, many young bioinformaticians were trained by him.

== Career summary ==
- 1971–1975: Assistant Professor, Systems Engineering and Operations Research and Statistics, Rensselaer Polytechnic Institute.
- 1971–1975: Consultant to the Ministry of Maternal and Child Health, Dominican Republic.
- 1975–1981: Director of Operations Research and Statistics, Division of Epidemiology, New York State Department of Health.
- 1981–2003: Chief of the Biometrics/Bioinformatics Laboratory, Wadsworth Center for Laboratories and Research, New York State Department of Health.
- 1985–1992: Statistical Consultant, Harrison Radiator Division General Motors Corp.
- 1992–1996: Visiting Scientist, National Center for Biotechnology Information, NLM-NIH.
- 2000–2003: Research Professor, Computer Science Department, Rensselaer Polytechnic Institute (one day per week).
- 2004–2006: Director of the Center for Computational Molecular Biology, and Professor of Applied Mathematics, Brown University.
- 2004–present: Professor of Applied Mathematics and Center for Computational Molecular Biology, Brown University.
