= Lauren Hersch Nicholas =

American health economist

Academic background
- Education: BS, Policy Analysis and Management, 2002, Cornell University; MPP, Public Policy, 2004, George Washington University; MPhil, PhD, Social Policy and Policy Analysis, 2008, Columbia University
- Thesis: Medicare advantage?: the effects of managed care on Medicare quality, costs, and enrollment (2008)

Lauren Hersch Nicholas is an American health economist. She is a professor at the University of Colorado Anschutz Medical Campus and an adjunct associate professor in the Department of Health Policy and Management at Johns Hopkins Bloomberg School of Public Health.

== Early life and education ==
Hersch Nicholas earned her Bachelor of Science degree from Cornell University in 2002 before enrolling at George Washington University for her Master of Public Policy degree in 2004. As a graduate student, she co-published The cost of privatization: extra payments to Medicare Advantage plans with Brian Biles and Barbara S. Cooper. Their study found that people with private Medicare plans will pay 8.4% more on average than fee-for-service costs. Upon receiving her degree, Hersch Nicholas earned a Master of Philosophy and PhD at Columbia University in Social Policy and Policy Analysis in 2008. Her completed dissertation Medicare Advantage? Managed Care and Medicare Quality, Cost and Enrollment won the 2009 Heinz Dissertation Award from the National Academy of Social Insurance. Hersch Nicholas completed her National Institute on Aging postdoctoral fellowship at the University of Michigan.

== Career ==
Upon completing her postdoctoral fellowship, Hersch Nicholas stayed at the University of Michigan (UMich) as a faculty affiliate in the Survey Research Center at their Institute for Social Research. In this role, she led a study which found that patients who had completed advance directives were less likely to die in a hospital. In 2013, Hersch Nicholas left UMich to become an assistant professor at Johns Hopkins School of Medicine.

As an assistant professor at Johns Hopkins, Hersch Nicholas led multiple studies on the benefits and consequences of Medicare. She was the lead author of a research paper which indicated that the number of minority patients with Medicare receiving bariatric surgery were declining after the Medicare Center of Excellence Policy was implemented. It was found that the policy unintentionally discriminated against non-white patients. She received the Healthcare Cost and Utilization Project's 2013 Outstanding Article of the Year Award for her research. The following year, Hersch Nicholas led a study on the quality of care given to elderly Medicare beneficiaries in nursing homes, long-term care facilities, or living at home. Her research team found that elderly patients living on their own, or with family members, who were cognitively impaired were treated more aggressively compared to their counterparts in living facilities. The findings were believed to be the first to "estimate the prevalence of cognitive impairment and dementia at the end-of-life and examine the associated healthcare costs and utilization for community dwellers." In a similar fashion, she worked alongside Justin B. Dimick to lead various studies on quality and care in hospitals. One of such studies worked with an initiative called the National Surgical Quality Improvement Program (ACS-NSQIP) to conclude that quality reporting in hospitals were not accurate enough to improve their quality of surgical safety or save costs. The study examined 263 hospitals and analyzed data from over 1,000 seniors enrolled in Medicare who had a major operation at those hospitals.

Another main research area Hersch Nicholas focused on as an assistant professor was on Medicare fraud and out-of-pocket costs. In 2016, Hersch Nicholas co-led a survey-based study on beneficiaries of Medicare who developed cancer and paid out-of-pocket expenditures for their treatments. Her team found that some cancer patients paid as high as 63% out-of-pocket for their treatments. This developed into her later research which focused on Medicare fraud and the reasons behind it. Her team analyzed demographics of patients seen by excluded and non-excluded providers, and found that those excluded were more likely to be minorities, disabled, and dually-enrolled in Medicaid to supplement financial assistance for health care. As a result, these vulnerable populations were more likely to commit Medicare fraud due to their marginalization. In the same year, Hersch Nicholas collaborated with researchers at Temple University to suggest that medical marijuana laws could lead to the overall improvement older adult's health.

In February 2020, Hersch Nicholas was promoted to associate professor in the Department of Health Policy and Management. In 2023, Hersch Nicholas joined the faculty at the University of Colorado.
