= Antonia Novello =

14th Surgeon General of the United States

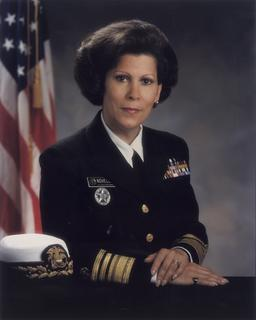

Commissioner of the New York State Department of Health
- In office June 1999 – December 31, 2006
- Governor: George Pataki
- Preceded by: Dennis P. Whalen (Acting)
- Succeeded by: Richard F. Daines

14th Surgeon General of the United States
- In office March 9, 1990 – June 30, 1993
- President: George H. W. Bush; Bill Clinton
- Preceded by: James Mason (Acting)
- Succeeded by: Robert Whitney (Acting)

Personal details
- Born: August 23, 1944 (age 82) Fajardo, Puerto Rico
- Party: Republican
- Education: University of Puerto Rico, Río Piedras (BS); University of Puerto Rico School of Medicine (MD); Johns Hopkins University (MPH)

Military service
- Allegiance: United States
- Rank: Vice admiral
- Unit: USPHS Commissioned Corps

Antonia Coello Novello (born August 23, 1944) is a Puerto Rican physician and public health administrator. She was a vice admiral in the Public Health Service Commissioned Corps and served as 14th Surgeon General of the United States from 1990 to 1993. Novello was the first woman and first Hispanic person to serve as Surgeon General. Novello also served as Commissioner of Health for the State of New York from 1999 to 2006. Novello has received numerous awards including more than fifty honorary degrees, was elected to the National Academy of Medicine in 2000, and has been inducted into the National Women's Hall of Fame. Her memoir, Duty Calls: Lessons Learned from an Unexpected Life of Service, was published in English and in Spanish in 2024.

== Early life ==
Antonia Coello was born on August 23, 1944, in Fajardo, Puerto Rico, to Antonio Coello, who died when she was young, and Ana Delia Flores Coello, who worked as a school teacher and principal. Her mother emphasized the importance of education, hard work, and respect and care for others, all lessons that Novello took to heart. She was the older of two children; she also had a half-brother. After her divorce, her mother, Ana Delia Flores, remarried. Novello did not know her father. At birth, Novello was diagnosed with congenital megacolon, a condition that required Novello to spend two weeks every summer in the hospital. Although Novello was told at eight years old that she should have surgery to correct her problem, it would take another ten years before such an operation would happen. Nevertheless, Novello managed to excel in her study to become a doctor. Her experience with that disease left such an impact on her that she vowed to become a doctor so that "no other person is going to wait 18 years for surgery."

== Education ==
At an early age, Novello's mother, a school teacher and later high school principal, stressed the importance of an education. Novello excelled in her education and graduated from high school at the age of 15. She attended the University of Puerto Rico in Rio Piedras, where she received her Bachelor of Science degree in 1965. She went on to the University of Puerto Rico School of Medicine in San Juan, where she received her Doctor of Medicine degree in 1970. That same year, she married Joseph R. Novello and they both moved to Ann Arbor, Michigan where she continued her medical studies. Novello began a pediatric internship at University of Michigan Medical School. She became the first woman to receive the "University of Michigan Pediatrics Department Intern of the Year" award. In 1973, Novello and her husband moved to Washington D.C. to begin her residency in pediatric nephrology at Georgetown University School of Medicine Hospital until 1976. She earned her Masters in Public Health from Johns Hopkins University in 1982 and her Doctorate in Public Health also from Johns Hopkins in 2000.

== Career ==
=== Pediatric nephrologist ===
In 1976, Novello opened her own private practice in Springfield, Virginia, where she worked as a pediatrician. However, she soon realized that she lacked adequate emotional detachment for her work so she terminated her practice. Novello stated in an interview, "When the pediatrician cries as much as the parents do, then you know it's time to get out."

=== Public Health Service ===
In 1979, Novello joined the Public Health Service and received a commission in the Public Health Service Commissioned Corps (PHSCC). Her first assignment was as a project officer at the National Institute of Arthritis, Metabolism and Digestive Diseases of the National Institutes of Health (NIH). From 1976, she also held a clinical appointment in pediatrics at Georgetown University School of Medicine. During her years at NIH, Novello worked on an MPH degree from the Johns Hopkins School of Hygiene and Public Health, receiving the degree in 1982.

Novello held various positions at NIH before being appointed to Assistant Surgeon General grade in the PHSCC and assignment as the deputy director of the National Institute of Child Health and Human Development (NICHD) in 1986. She also served as Coordinator for AIDS Research for NICHD from September 1987. In this role, she developed a particular interest in pediatric AIDS, which caught the attention of the White House.

Novello made major contributions to the drafting and enactment of the Organ Transplantation Procurement Act of 1984 while assigned to the United States Senate Committee on Labor and Human Resources, working with the staff of committee chairman Orrin Hatch.

=== Surgeon General ===
Novello was appointed Surgeon General by President George H. W. Bush, beginning her tenure on March 9, 1990, and was appointed to the temporary rank of vice admiral in the regular corps while the Surgeon General. She was the first woman and the first Hispanic to hold the position.

During her tenure as Surgeon General, Novello focused her attention on the health of women, children and minorities, as well as on underage drinking, smoking, and AIDS. She played an important role in launching the Healthy Children Ready to Learn Initiative. She was actively involved in working with other organizations to promote immunization of children and childhood injury prevention efforts. She spoke out often and forcefully about illegal underage drinking, and called upon the United States Department of Health and Human Services Inspector General to issue a series of reports on the subject.

Novello also worked to discourage illegal tobacco use by young people, and repeatedly criticized the tobacco industry for appealing to the youth market through the use of cartoon characters such as Joe Camel. A workshop that she convened led to the emergence of a National Hispanic/Latino Health Initiative.

Novello was controversial among abortion rights advocates due to her support of a policy prohibiting family planning program workers who received federal financing from discussing abortion with their patients.

Novello left the post of Surgeon General on June 30, 1993, with the administration of President Bill Clinton praising her for her "vigor and talent."

=== Later years ===
After leaving the position of Surgeon General, Novello remained in the regular corps of the Public Health Service. She was assigned to the United Nations Children's Fund (UNICEF) as Special Representative for Health and Nutrition from 1993 to 1996 reverting to her permanent two-star rank of rear admiral. In 1996, she became visiting professor of health policy and management at the Johns Hopkins School of Hygiene and Public Health. She retired from the Public Health Service and the PHSCC shortly after with the grade of vice admiral.

In 1999, Governor of New York George Pataki appointed Novello as Commissioner of the New York State Department of Health. She served until 2006.

From 2008 to 2014, Novello was vice president of Women and Children Health and Policy Affairs at Disney Children's Hospital at Florida Hospital in Orlando, Florida.

On June 26, 2009, in a plea deal with prosecutors, Novello pleaded guilty to one felony count of filing a false instrument involving a worker's duties. Her guilty plea was accepted by the court on August 13, 2009. She was sentenced to pay $22,500 in restitution, a $5,000 fine, and spend 250 hours doing community service at a medical clinic for uninsured patients. Outside the court immediately after the sentencing, her lawyer called the crime an "administrative processing offense – nothing else." On March 31, 2022, by order of the Albany County Court, Judge Roger D. McDonough, the records were sealed.

As of December 31, 2014, Novello retired from her position as an executive director of public health policy at Florida Hospital - Orlando.

== Awards ==
Selected awards and honors include:

- Public Health Service Commendation Medal, 1983
- Public Health Service Citation Medal, 1984
- Public Health Service Regular Corps Ribbon, 1987
- Public Health Service Outstanding Service Medal, 1988
- Public Health Service Unit Commendation, 1988, 1990, 1992, 1994
- Surgeon General's Exemplary Service Medal, 1989
- Public Health Service Outstanding Unit Citation, 1989
- Public Health Service Meritorious Service Medal, 1990
- Public Health Service National Emergency Preparedness Award, 1990
- Public Health Service Foreign Duty Award, 1990
- United States Coast Guard Meritorious Service Medal, 1992
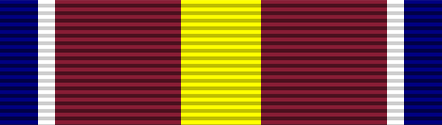
- Public Health Service Distinguished Service Medal, 1992
- Civilian Award for Humanitarian Service, 2018
- Commissioned Officers Association Ribbon
- Association of Military Surgeons of the United States Ribbon
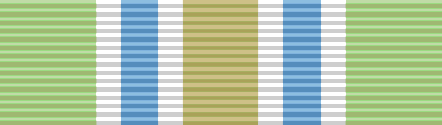
- Environmental Protection Agency Bronze Medal for Commendable Service, 1993
- Reserve Officers Association Ribbon
- Navy Distinguished Public Service Award, 1993
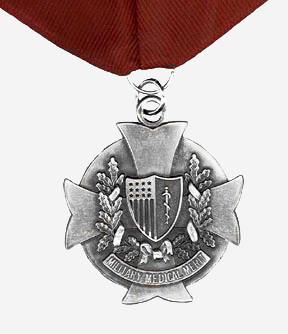
- Order of Military Medical Merit
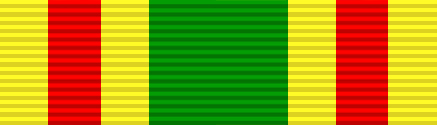
- Puerto Rico Merit Cross 2023
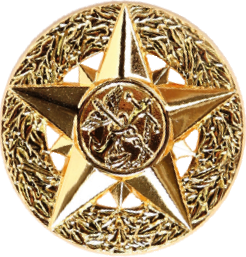
- Surgeon General Badge
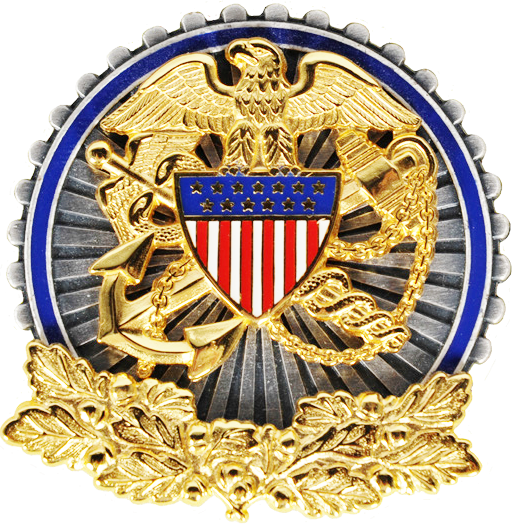
- Office of the Secretary of Health and Human Services Badge

- 1988, 1992, American Men and Women of Science
- 1990, Life Achievement Award, the National Puerto Rican Coalition
- 1990, Lillian D. Wald Award
- 1991, Living Legacy Award, Women's International Center
- 1991, Medical Achievement Award, American Liver Foundation
- 1991, Congressional Hispanic Caucus Medal
- 1991, Simon Bolivar, National Award Recipient
- 1991, The Elizabeth Blackwell Medal, Hobart and William Smith Colleges
- 1992, The Washington Times Freedom Award
- 1992, Elizabeth Ann Seton Award, National Catholic Education Association
- 1992, Order of Military Medical Merit, US Army
- 1993, La Leche League International Award of Recognition
- 1993 Ellis Island Congressional Medal of Honor, Ellis Island
- 1993, American Medical Association, Nathan David Award
- 1993, Department of Defense, Legion of Merit Medal, United States Army
- 1993, Bronze Medal for Commendable Service, U.S. Environmental Protection Agency
- 1994, Induction, National Women's Hall of Fame.
- 1995, Ronald McDonald Children's Charities Award of Excellence
- 1995, Veterans of Foreign Wars, James E. Van Zandt Citizenship Award
- 1996, Miami Children's Hospital International Pediatric Hall of Fame
- 1996, Hispanic Hero Award, U.S. Hispanic Leadership Conference
- 1999, Hispanic Heritage Foundation - Leadership Award
- 2000, elected to the National Academy of Medicine
- 2000, YWCA Racial Justice Award
- 2001, American Cancer Society Humanitarian Award
- 2002, University Medal of Honor, State University of New York at Stony Brook
- 2002, American Medical Women's Association, International Women in Medicine Hall of Fame
- 2002, Smithsonian Institution, The James Smithson Bicentennial Medal
- 2002, The National Medical Fellowships Lifetime Achievement Award
- 2003, The Distinguished Service to the Nation's Public Health Award
- 2003, Homeland Security Award, National Foundation for Women Legislators
- 2005, National Governor's Association, Distinguished Service to State Government Award
- 2006, Women of the Américas Award, Unión de Mujeres de Las Américas
- 2008, Legacy Award for Sciences, Smithsonian Institution Latino Center
- 2011, El Quixote Award for Lifetime Achievement
- 2017, Government of Puerto Rico Recognition Award for Services Rendered During Hurricane Maria
- 2018, Jones Act Centennial Medal of U.S. Citizenship, Government of Puerto Rico
- 2018, Dolores C. Huerta Woman of Courage Medallion, United States Hispanic Leadership Institute
- 2018, Impact Leader for Advocacy, Change Maker Impact Awards, United Way
- 2018, Special Recognition Award, Teachers Association of Puerto Rico
- 2019, Meritorious Public Service Medal for Exceptional Service during the Recovery Operations in Puerto Rico during Hurricane Maria, U.S. Army
- 2020, USA Today, 100 Women of the Century
- 2020, Lifetime Achievement Award, Latina Style Magazine
- 2021, Premio a la Excelencia del Servicio al Projimo, Sister Isolina Ferré Award
- 2023, Puerto Rico National Guard, Merit Cross Medal
- 2025, Induction, Puerto Rico Hall of Fame of Medicine

Novello has been awarded more than 50 honorary doctorates.

== Personal life ==
Novello was married to former US Navy flight surgeon and psychiatrist, Joseph R. Novello. She is the sister-in-law of comedian and actor Don Novello, creator of the character Father Guido Sarducci.

== See also ==
- List of Puerto Ricans
- Puerto Rican scientists and inventors
- History of women in Puerto Rico

Military offices
Preceded by James Mason; Acting	Surgeon General of the United States; 1990–1993	Succeeded by Robert Whitney; Acting
