= Definitive Healthcare =

American healthcare data and analytics company

- Industry: Healthcare
- Founded: 2011; 15 years ago
- Headquarters: Framingham, Massachusetts, U.S.
- Website: www.definitivehc.com

Definitive Healthcare, Corp. is a publicly traded healthcare data and analytics company headquartered in Framingham, Massachusetts, United States. The company operates subscription-based products and solutions with data on healthcare organizations, providers, services, medical and scientific experts, claims, and consumers.

Definitive Healthcare supports life sciences, healthcare providers, software and IT, consulting, financial services, and other organizations operating within the healthcare market.

== History ==
Definitive Healthcare was founded in 2011 by Jason Krantz. The company initially offered reference and affiliation data on U.S. healthcare organizations and providers. Through its Monocl, Populi, and Carevoyance acquisitions, Definitive Healthcare expanded its data offerings for biopharmaceutical companies, medical device companies, and provider organizations.

In 2015, Spectrum Equity acquired a minority stake in Definitive Healthcare. In 2019, Advent International acquired a majority stake in the parent company of Definitive Healthcare, alongside existing investors and the founder.

The company became publicly listed on the Nasdaq under the ticker symbol DH in September 2021, raising approximately US$420 million.

== Products and services ==
Definitive Healthcare aggregates data across the healthcare ecosystem. Categories of data include:

- Healthcare organizations, including hospitals and health systems, long-term care facilities, ambulatory surgery centers, imaging centers, rehabilitation facilities, behavioral health facilities, and physician groups.
- Healthcare professionals, including physicians, clinical researchers, key opinion leaders, allied health professionals, nurses, and executives.
- Healthcare reference and affiliations, including people and organization-based affiliations, technology installations, quality metrics, financials, and therapeutic areas.
- Medical and prescription claims from Medicare and all-payer claims data.
- Consumer health information, including social determinants of health (SDoH).

Definitive Healthcare offers product suites, each with sub-products:

- View Suite provides data and insights for healthcare organizations (HCOs) and professionals (HCPs), including affiliations, financials, quality, clinical activity and volumes, and other key attributes.
- Monocl Expert Suite focuses on medical and scientific expert data, including key opinion leaders (KOLs), clinical activity, publications, clinical trials, grants, and industry collaborations.
- Populi Suite offers insights into healthcare utilization, market needs, and therapeutic area growth across market intelligence, network intelligence, and population intelligence.
- Carevoyance Suite enables healthcare organizations, health tech companies, and life sciences by aggregating relevant clinical and operational insights on healthcare professionals and organizations used for medical device sales, product commercialization, and business development.

== Acquisitions ==
#	Date	Company	Description	Reference
1	January 2019	HIMSS Analytics data products	HIMSS Analytics’ Logic, Predict, and Analyze data assets	
2	October 2020	Monocl	Provider of medical and scientific expert data	
3	February 2022	Analytical Wizards	Healthcare analytics company	
4	July 2023	Populi	Healthcare data and analytics company	
5	January 2024	Carevoyance	Platform providing data on healthcare providers and markets	

== Locations ==
Definitive Healthcare is headquartered in Framingham, Massachusetts, United States. The company also maintains a presence in Gothenburg, Sweden, and in Bengaluru, Karnataka, India.

== Recognitions ==
Definitive Healthcare appeared on The Boston Globe’s “Top Places to Work” list in 2017 through 2022. In 2024, Definitive Healthcare was named the Databricks Healthcare and Life Sciences Partner of the Year. In 2025, it was listed among Built In's “Best Midsize Places to Work in Boston.”
