= David Axelrod (disambiguation) =

David Axelrod is an American political consultant.

The name may also refer to:

- David Axelrod (musician) (1931–2017), American composer, arranger and producer
- David Axelrod (physician) (1935–1994), American physician and bureaucrat

== See also ==
- David Ha'ivri (born Jason David Axelrod, 1967), Israeli independent political strategist
