= New York State Department of Health =

Agency in the US state of New York

- Seal

- Logo

Department overview
- Formed: February 19, 1901
- Jurisdiction: New York
- Headquarters: Albany, NY
- Department executive: James V. McDonald M.D., M.P.H., Commissioner (Appointed June 9, 2023)
- Key document: Public Health Law
- Website: www.health.ny.gov

The New York State Department of Health is the department of the New York state government responsible for public health. It promotes the prevention and control of disease, environmental health, healthy lifestyles, and emergency preparedness and response; supervises local health boards; oversees reporting and vital records; conducts surveillance of hospitals; does research at the Wadsworth Center; and administers several other health insurance programs and institutions. Its regulations are compiled in title 10 of the New York Codes, Rules and Regulations.

== Infrastructure ==
New York State relies on a county-based system for delivery of public health services. 58 local health departments offer core services including assessing community health, disease control and prevention, family health, and health education; 37 localities provide environmental health services, while the other 21 rely on the state's Department of Health.

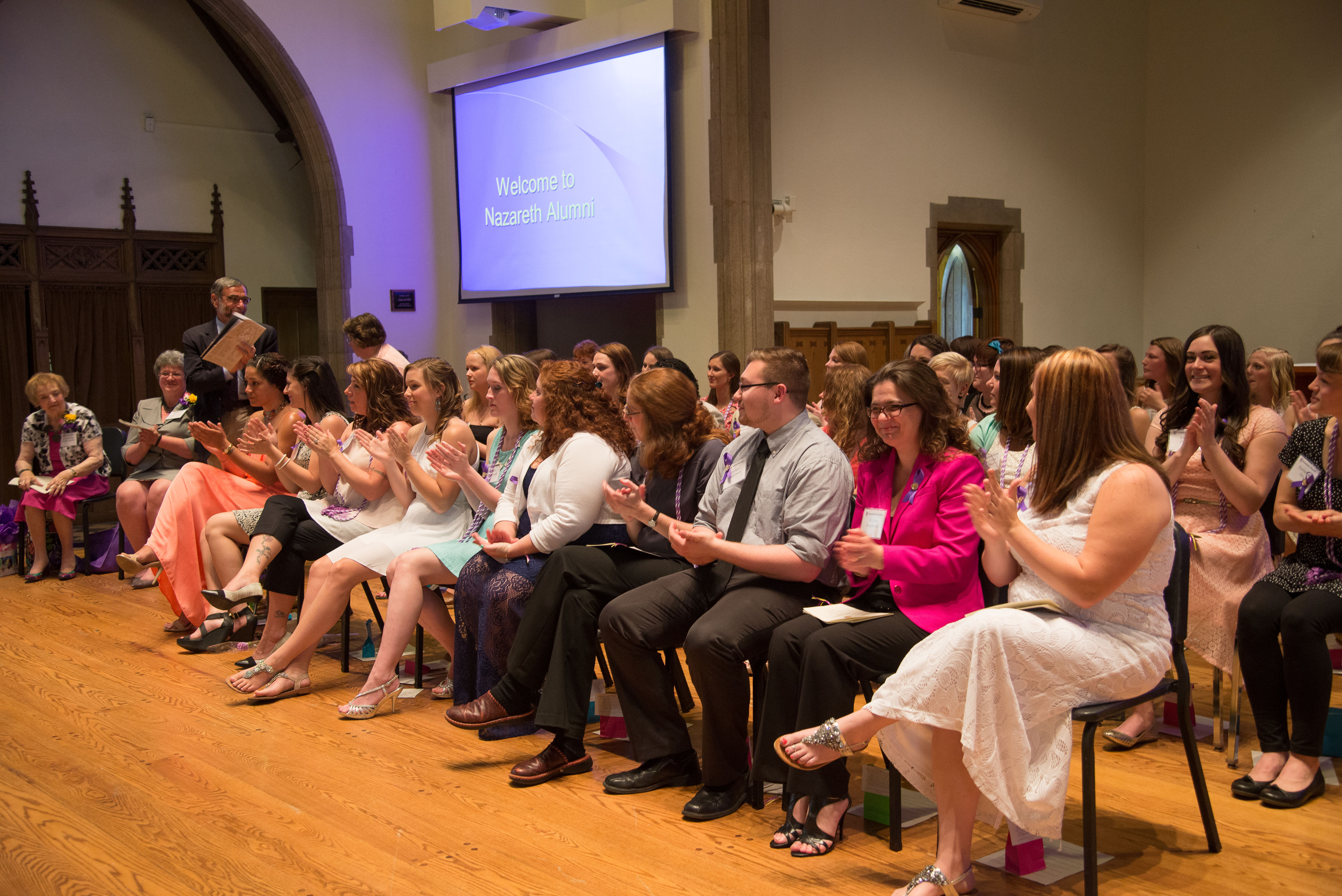
A nurse pinning ceremony at Nazareth College. Nurses represent a majority of rural public health workers.

At the local level, public health workers are found not only in local health agencies but also in private and nonprofit organizations concerned with the public's health. The most common professional disciplines are physicians, nurses, environmental specialists, laboratorians, health educators, disease investigators, outreach workers, and managers, as well as other allied health professions. Nurses represented 22% of the localities' workforce (and 42% of full-time equivalent workers in rural localities), scientific/investigative staff represented 22%–27% of the workforce, support staff represented 28%, education/outreach staff represented 10%, and physicians represented 1%. In 2018 the Department of Health had over 3300 personnel in its central office, three regional offices, three field offices and nine district health offices, and an additional 1,400 personnel in its five healthcare institutions.

== Public health ==
The New York State Department of Health, through the Public Health Law and State Sanitary Code, supervises and enforces statewide standards for communicable disease control, nuisance abatement, sanitation, and emergency response, exercising reserve police powers and regulatory authority while overseeing local health officers and coordinating with federal agencies to preserve and protect public health.

== Facility regulation ==
The commissioner is the executive enforcement authority over Article 28 healthcare facilities—conducting inspections, determining Medicaid necessity/appropriateness, administering patient-rights and public reporting systems, promulgating specified regulations, and imposing penalties and other compliance actions. Subject to the commissioner's approval, the Public Health and Health Planning Council (PHHPC) is a quasi-legislative and quasi-judicial authority that adopts and amends the State Sanitary Code, promulgates Article 28 regulations establishing operating-certificate standards, reporting and accounting systems, hospital classification and cost-finding methodologies, reimbursement and rate-setting frameworks, and penalty systems for residential health care facilities, and also exercises authority over the certificate of need process.

The certificate of need (CON) process is a regulatory mechanism used to oversee the establishment, construction, renovation, and major equipment acquisition of healthcare facilities. The CON process aims to control health care costs and prevent duplicative services by ensuring new investments meet a community need. New York's CON requirements are among the most extensive in the nation, covering all six major categories of health services: hospital beds, non-hospital beds, medical equipment, new facilities, new services, and even emergency medical transport, and New York is unique in applying CON laws to dentists' offices.

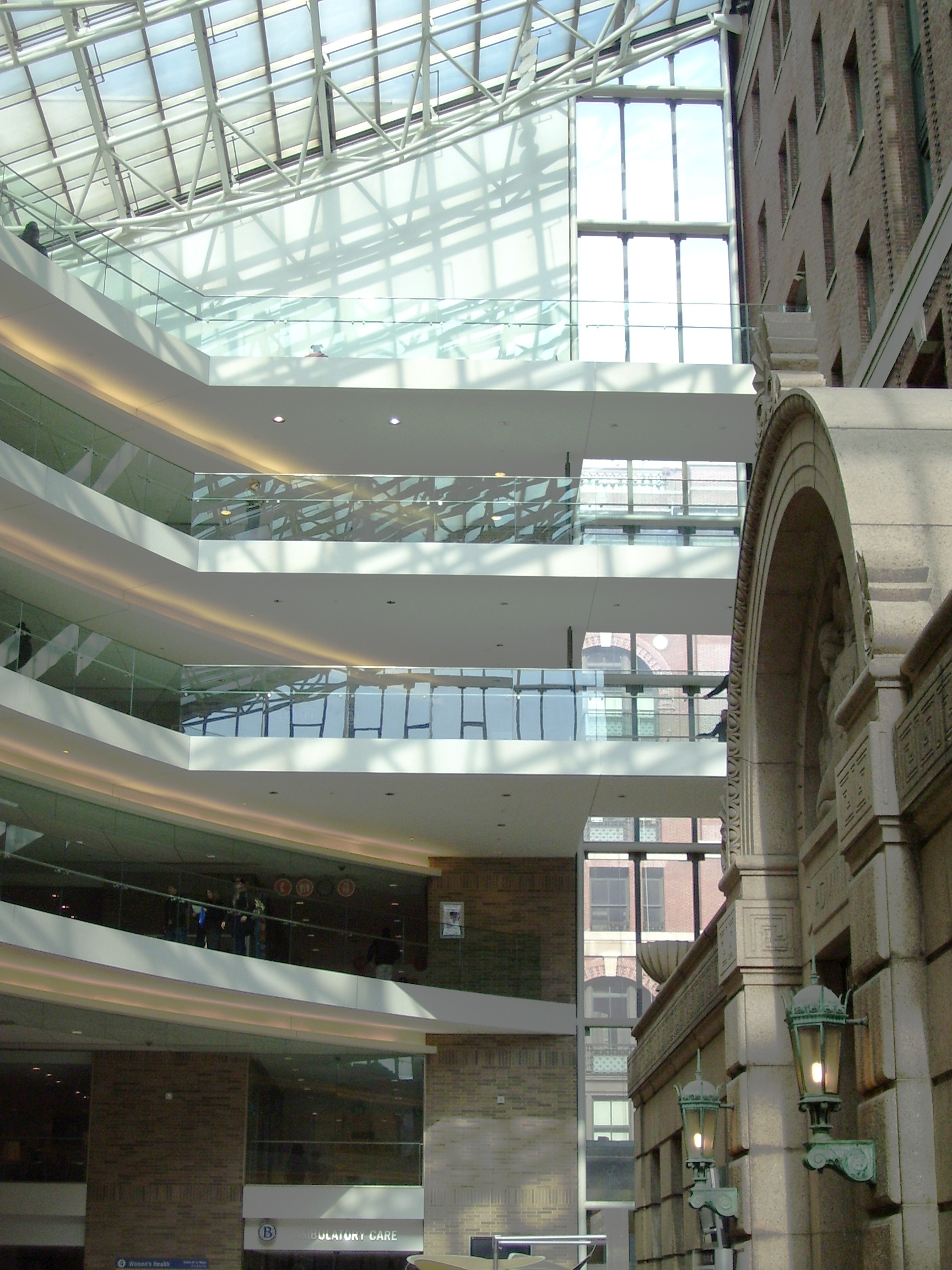
The Bellevue Hospital atrium. NYC Health + Hospitals is the largest safety-net hospital system in the US.

The department enforces nurse staffing transparency and planning by requiring Article 28 hospitals and nursing homes to disclose unit-level staffing and nursing-sensitive outcome metrics on request, while general hospitals must maintain nurse-led clinical-staffing committees that annually file and implement unit- and shift-specific staffing plans, incorporating acuity, skill-mix and service-specific minimums (e.g., ICU/CCU, OR, perinatal, burn, PICU, transplant), including a 1:2 RN-to-patient minimum in ICU/critical care.

In 1995, after a series of inspections by the Department the largest sperm bank in New York State was ordered to close (and no longer operate semen banks and blood banks), over the objections of its owner the Daxor Corporation and its president, CEO, and majority shareholder Joseph Feldschuh, by New York State Supreme Court Justice Harold Tompkins. The Justice found that Daxor had repeatedly endangered the public health over several years. A 1993 inspection had documented 517 violations by the sperm bank, including its failure to screen sperm donors properly for sexually transmitted diseases. Rather, the inspections by the Department showed that Daxor had, in fact, made available semen from men who had tested positive for hepatitis, chlamydia, and gonorrhea. Daxor employees told government investigators that Feldschuh had instructed them to make false entries on business records and to lie to investigators. Feldschuh claimed New York State Health Department officials were conspiring to shut down his business, sued them three times, appealed three times, and lost each of the six times.

== Workforce development ==
The Health Department's State Board for Professional Medical Conduct and Office of Professional Medical Conduct are responsible for investigating and adjudicating complaints against physicians, physician assistants, and specialist assistants. The Education Department's State Board for Medicine advises on licensing, practice standards, and professional conduct for physicians and physician assistants. The Health Department licenses the practice of radiography, radiation therapy, and nuclear medicine technology. It also certifies first responders, EMTs, advanced EMTs, and ambulance services. And it licenses the manufacture, distribution, import, export, institutional dispensing, institutional dispensing limited, conducting of research, instructional activities, or chemical analysis of or with controlled substances. Other unlicensed assistive personnel such as certified nurse aides, feeding assistants, personal care aides, and home health aides are not licensed but are governed through department–approved training, competency evaluation, and registry frameworks. The Education Department and its boards regulate the other allied health professions.

New York funds graduate medical education (GME) through the department with hospital rate add-ons, HCRA-based GME and professional education pool supplemental payments, and administering programs like Empire Clinical Research Investigator Program (ECRIP) and Doctors Across New York (DANY). New York accounted for nearly half of the nation's total state Medicaid GME spending—$1.82 billion of the total $3.87 billion in 2012—and more than 10 times any other state.

== Health information ==
The Statewide Health Information Network for New York (SHIN-NY, pronounced "shiny") is a health information exchange that allows healthcare providers to access and share patient data, managed by the nonprofit New York eHealth Collaborative. There are several regional health information organizations such as Hixny.

The Statewide Planning and Research Cooperative System (SPARCS) is the statewide hospital discharge and encounter database. SPARCS collects patient-level data on hospital inpatient stays and outpatient encounters—including emergency department and ambulatory surgery visits—covering patient characteristics, diagnoses, procedures, services, and charges, as well as similar services provided at hospital extension clinics and licensed diagnostic and treatment centers. The All-Payer Database (APD) is the state all-payer claims database administered by the department.

The Health Commerce System (HCS) is the web portal that serves as the primary communications, reporting, and credentialing platform between the department and health facilities, providers, and local public health authorities. It includes a number of applications, such as the Health Emergency Response Data System (HERDS) for emergency and routine data collection, the Integrated Health Alerting and Notification System (IHANS) for urgent alerts and guidelines, the New York State Immunization Information System (NYSIIS) for vaccine records, and eCLEP for Wadsworth Center lab reporting. eMedNY is New York's Medicaid Management Information System (MMIS).

== History ==
In 1866, the state legislature passed the Metropolitan Health Law and established the NYC Metropolitan Board of Health, and in 1870 the legislature replaced it with the NYC Department of Health. The State Board of Health was created 18 May 1880 by the 103rd Legislature. The State Department of Health and its commissioner were created by an act of 19 February 1901 of the 124th Legislature, superseding the board.

The earliest New York state laws regarding public health were quarantine laws for the port of New York, first passed by the New York General Assembly in 1758. The 1793 Philadelphia yellow fever epidemic precipitated the 1799–1800 creation of the New York Marine Hospital, and in 1801 its resident physician and the health officers of the port were constituted as the New York City board of health. The 1826–1837 cholera pandemic precipitated further legislation. In 1847 a law mandated civil registration of vital events (births, marriages, and deaths). The 1881–1896 cholera pandemic further caused an expansion of its powers to compel reporting and to perform the duties of local boards of health.

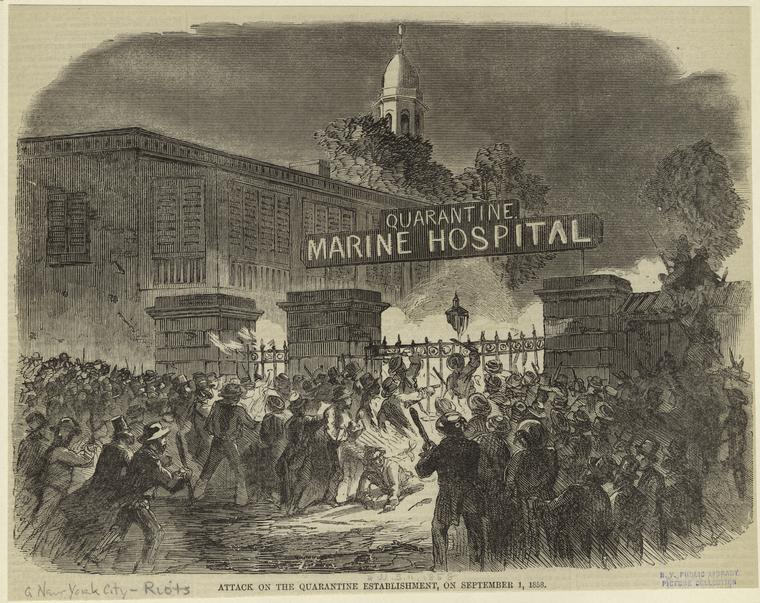
The 1858 Staten Island Quarantine War was a series of attacks on the New York Marine Hospital in Staten Island

The certificate of need (CON) requirement was created by New York in 1964. In 1965 the department was given central responsibility over hospitals and related facilities. 2010 state budget legislation abolished the Public Health Council and the State Hospital Review and Planning Council and consolidated their functions into the newly created Public Health and Health Planning Council (PHHPC). The Nursing Care Quality Protection Act was amended in 2021 requiring general hospitals to establish clinical staffing committees to develop and oversee clinical staffing plans, to include specific nurse-to-patient ratios for each unit and work shift.

The state implemented Medicaid in 1966 and designated the state Department of Social Services (DSS) as the "single state agency" but required it to contract with the Health Department. The Social Services Department and local social districts were responsible for eligibility determinations and paying claims, while the Health Department and local health districts were responsible for settings standards (including fees schedules) and supervising and surveilling providers. Oversight of adult homes, enriched housing programs, residences for adults, assisted living programs, and public homes (other than shelters for adults) were transferred from DSS by the Welfare Reform Act of 1997. In 2012, the Health Department started assuming administrative responsibilities for Medicaid from the counties.

By 1970 the state began to regulate health insurance reimbursement rates, in 1983 began all-payer rate setting, and by 1986-1988 had moved to a case-based system. In 1982–1983 the state overhauled the hospital reimbursement system by imposing revenue caps, creating regional bad debt and charity care pools, and shifting all payors into a uniform prospective payment methodology (NYPHRM I). In 1987 the New York State Council on Graduate Medical Education was created by executive order. In 1988 the state established a mandatory DRG-based case payment system for all payors, continued bad debt and charity pools through payor add-ons and revenue assessments, provided direct and indirect cost reimbursements for graduate medical education, added quality protections and HMO negotiation authority, and aimed to curb hospital cost growth (NYPHRM III). In 1996 these were replaced by the current Health Care Reform Act (HCRA), allowing negotiated reimbursement rates and establishing tax funding for public goods like graduate medical education, charity care, and public health. The Health Care Reform Act of 2000 (HCRA 2000) was a major extension and modification that made significant changes to how New York State funded hospitals, subsidized care for the uninsured, and managed health insurance programs. In 2006 the Hospital Financial Assistance Law (HFAL or Manny's Law) was enacted requiring hospitals to adopt and publicize uniform financial assistance policies, including income-based limits on charges, sliding-scale discounts, reasonable payment terms, and restrictions on aggressive collections, as a condition for receiving ICP payments.

In 1998 the department was given authority over the health insurance external appeals process.

== List of commissioners ==
| Name | Dates in Office | Governors Served | Comments |
|---|---|---|---|
| Daniel Lewis | March 6, 1901 – Early 1905 | Benjamin B. Odell, Jr. | Previously was President of the State Board of Health, which became the Department of Health, and served out full term |
| Eugene H. Porter | May 1905 – Early 1914 | Frank W. Higgins, Charles Evans Hughes, Horace White, John Alden Dix, William Sulzer, Martin H. Glynn | Served out his term |
| Hermann M. Biggs | January 19, 1914 – June 28, 1923 | Martin H. Glynn, Charles S. Whitman, Alfred E. Smith, Nathan L. Miller | Died while serving |
| Matthias Nicoll Jr. | July 12, 1923 – January 11, 1930 | Alfred E. Smith, Franklin D. Roosevelt | Resigned to become Commissioner of the Westchester County (New York) Department of Health |
| Thomas J. Parran, Jr. | March 5, 1930 – May 6, 1936 | Franklin D. Roosevelt, Herbert Lehman | Resigned to become Surgeon General of the United States Public Health Service |
| Edward S. Godfrey | April 21, 1936 – May 1, 1947 | Herbert Lehman, Charles Poletti, Thomas E. Dewey | Retired |
| Herman E. Hilleboe | July 1, 1947 – January 7, 1963 | Thomas E. Dewey, W. Averell Harriman, Nelson A. Rockefeller | Became head of the Division of Public Health Practice at the Columbia University School of Public Health |
| Hollis S. Ingraham | January 7, 1963? – January 2, 1975 | Nelson A. Rockefeller | Served out full term |
| Robert P. Whalen | January 2, 1975 – April 29, 1975 (acting); April 29, 1975 – December 31,1978 | Hugh Carey | Resigned to become Vice chairman of the New York State Health Planning Commission |
| David Axelrod | January 1, 1979 – May 12, 1991 | Hugh Carey, Mario M. Cuomo | Resigned after a severe stroke |
| Lorna McBarnette | February 25, 1991 – June 9, 1992 | Mario M. Cuomo | Acting |
| Mark R. Chassin | June 9, 1992 – December 31, 1994 | Mario M. Cuomo | Served out full term |
| Barbara Ann DeBuono | Early February 1995 – November 1, 1998 | George E. Pataki | Resigned to become an executive in the NewYork-Presbyterian Healthcare System |
| Dennis P. Whalen | November 1, 1998 – June 15, 1999 | George E. Pataki | Acting |
| Antonia C. Novello | June 15, 1999 – December 31, 2006 | George E. Pataki | Served out full term |
| Richard F. Daines | February 2007 – December 31, 2010 | Eliot Spitzer, David Paterson | Served out full term |
| Nirav R. Shah | January 24, 2011 – May 4, 2014 | Andrew Cuomo | Resigned to become chief operating officer at Kaiser Permanente in Southern California |
| Howard A. Zucker | May 4, 2014 – May 5, 2015 (acting); May 5, 2015 – December 1, 2021 | Andrew Cuomo, Kathy Hochul | Part of Governor Cuomo and Hochul's COVID-19 task force during the pandemic |
| Mary T. Bassett | December 1, 2021 – January 1, 2023 | Kathy Hochul | Part of Governor Hochul's COVID-19 task force during the pandemic |
| James V. McDonald | January 1, 2023 – June 9, 2023 (acting); June 9, 2023 – current | Kathy Hochul | Current commissioner |

== See also ==
- New York State Office of Addiction Services and Supports (OASAS)
- New York State Office of Mental Health (OMH)
- New York State Office for People With Developmental Disabilities (OPWDD)
- New York City Department of Health and Mental Hygiene
- Wadsworth Center, the research-intensive public health laboratory of the New York State Department of Health
