= Lorna McBarnette =

Dr. Lorna Scott McBarnette (June 13, 1939 - March 17, 2009) was the Acting Commissioner of the New York State Department of Health from February 25, 1991 until June 9, 1992 (and eight years as deputy executive commissioner), dean of the School of Health Technology and Management at the State University at Stony Brook and Vice President for Institutional Development and Vice Provost for Health Professions at the American University of Antigua School of Nursing.

== Education ==
McBarnette earned a Bachelor of Arts degree from the College at Old Westbury, a Master of Science in Health Policy and Management from Harvard University, a Doctor of Education from LaSalle University, a Doctor of Science from American International School of Medicine and received a Certificate in Public Administration from Long Island University, C.W. Post College. She also earned a Ph.D. in public administration from the State University at Albany.
