= Metropolitan Health Bill =

1866 bill in New York, US

The Metropolitan Health Bill was the first bill in the New York state which put legal grounds for comprehensive control of sanitary conditions in the cities. It was signed into the law on February 26, 1866. It was the basis of the Metropolitan Health Law, and the success of its implementation and its thoroughness had made it the example for similar laws all over the United States.

== History ==
One of the active proponents of the Health Bill, Stephen Smith, in his book The City that Was outlined the history of the passage of the Health Bill, from his perspective. Stephen Smith recalls the case when a certain tenement building in New York City was identified as a major source of epidemic diseases, but it turned out there was no law or ordinance under which the City Government could force the owner to remedy the situation. Eventually the owner was forced to fix the building after a threat of public shame as a court. This incident was a trigger event in the growing sentiment towards health regulations reform, and soon the Sanitary Association was organized, which for several years introduced annually the Health Bill, which was routinely defeated by the City Inspector.

When in early 1860s the Citizen's Association of New York was formed, the Sanitary Association's cause was met with sympathy, and two committees were formed within the Citizen's association: one on health and another on law. In this new setting, it was decided to create a pilot Health Bill to introduce as the 1864 Legislature to test the objections. The City Inspector denied the alleged unsanitary conditions, and the Bill failed. Upon learning the obstacles, the two-pronged strategy was adopted.

The first line of attack was to prepare a solid proof of the unsanitary conditions. To this end, a thorough sanitary inspection of the city was carried out. The inspection resulted in a 20-volume study of sanitation in the entire city, and its summary was published as Report of the Council of Hygiene and Public Health of the Citizens' Association of New York (known as Citizen's Association Report on the Sanitary Condition of the City):

We, the citizens of Lower East Manhattan, declare that this city is unsuitable for human development, child development and moral development. We, citizens of all classes, have suffered from deadly diseases such as cholera, tuberculosis, small pox and pneumonia at the hands of public officials who scoff at our sufferings. We believe that housing, politics, morals and health are all intertwined and without one, we would be quite at a loss.

The second line of attack was a political one: it was decided to bypass the Democratic machine of Mayor Tweed and introduce the bill on the state level dominated by the republicans, arguing that the health of the New York City was interdependent with the health of its surroundings and that the Metropolitan Health District was to be created, coincident with the Metropolitan Police District.

In April 1865 the Bill passed the Senate, but was defeated in the Assembly. However, by the end of the year the Republicans gained power in both houses, the Bill was reintroduced, and on February 19, 1866, the Bill passed the New York senate, 22–2, and the assembly, 74–28, and was signed into law by Governor Reuben Fenton on February 26.

Stephen Smith writes that in fact the Metropolitan Health Bill was instrumental in shifting power from Democrats to Republicans in the state Legislature: the Bill became a prominent issue during the elections and caused the defeat of the 17 Democrats who voted against it.

The Bill was the ground for the passage of the Metropolitan Health Law in 1866 for the formation of the Metropolitan Board of Health.
