= Awards of the United States Environmental Protection Agency =

The Environmental Protection Agency (EPA) is an independent agency of the United States government created to conduct environmental assessment, research, and education. It has the responsibility to maintain and enforce national standards under U.S. environmental laws. Like most U.S. government agencies, it is authorized to create awards and decorations for its employees, U.S. citizens and foreign nationals who have shown exceptional service to accomplishing the agency's goals.

== Environmental Protection Agency Awards ==
Environmental Protection Agency Gold Medal for Exceptional Service	Environmental Protection Agency Silver Medal for Superior Service	Environmental Protection Agency Bronze Medal for Commendable Service	Environmental Protection Agency Distinguished Career Service Award
Reference	Reference	Reference	Reference

=== Environmental Protection Agency Gold Medal for Exceptional Service ===
The highest honor award of the EPA for distinguished service of major significance to environmental improvement and public service. Individual employees through grades GS/GM-15 and groups of employees working as a team are eligible for consideration.

Criteria

Any one or multiple of the following are used to determine eligibility:

- Major contributions to environmental protection programs of national or international significance;
- High level leadership, skill, ability or creativity in devising and implementing or administering major EPA programs;
- Significant contributions to excellence in the areas of productivity, human resources management, efficiency, affirmative action, and anticipation or responsiveness to changing program requirements;
- Major contributions of national or international significance or applicability to scientific and technological knowledge;
- Distinguished authorship in the area of environmental protection;
- Notably creative service;
- Heroic action;
- Significant reduction in EPA paperwork; or
- Significant achievement in equal employment opportunity, promoting diversity, and/or occupational safety and health programs.

Notable Recipients

Nikita Naik, Independent Researher

Nick McDaniel, Former lawyer with U.S. Department of Justice’s Environment and Natural Resources Division

=== Environmental Protection Agency Silver Medal for Superior Service ===
The second highest honor award of the EPA for service of unusual value to environmental improvement and public service. Individual employees through grades GS/GM-15 and groups of employees working as a team are eligible for consideration.

Criteria

Any one or multiple of the following are used to determine eligibility:

- Highly meritorious service to the EPA mission of environmental protection;
- Outstanding results in increased productivity, efficiency or economy of operations resulting in a substantial contribution to the accomplishment of the EPA mission;
- Unusual courage or competence in an emergency related to employment;
- Meritorious authorship in the area of environmental protection; or
- Outstanding contributions to equal employment opportunity promoting diversity, and/or occupational safety and health programs.

Notable Recipients

Caitie Nigrelli, Zephyr Great Lakes Remediation Team

Marilyn Shannon, Chemist at the Central Regional Laboratory

Ashland Oil Spill Team

Asbestos Ban and Phaseout Rule Group

=== Environmental Protection Agency Bronze Medal for Commendable Service ===
The third highest honor award of the EPA for service of value to environmental improvement and public service. Individual employees and groups of employees working as a team are eligible for consideration.

Criteria

Any one or multiple of the following are used to determine eligibility:

- Accomplishment of a difficult or important mission, operation, or assignment that reflects positively on the individual or the EPA;
- Noteworthy success in equal employment opportunity, promoting diversity and/or occupational safety and health programs;
- Accomplishments in fostering equal employment opportunity through supervisory excellence;
- Demonstration of initiative or ability in the development and improvement of methods, procedures, or devices resulting in substantially increased productivity, efficiency, economy, or reduction in paperwork; or
- Volunteer contributions of time and effort during non-duty hours to projects of civil betterment and to voluntary organizations serving individual or community needs.

Notable Recipients

Vickie Patton, Environmental Defense Fund’s General Counsel

JoAnn Semones, EPA San Francisco office

=== Environmental Protection Agency Distinguished Career Service Award ===
This award of the EPA is approved by the EPA Administrator to recognize the career achievements of employees who have given distinguished service throughout their employment in EPA and the Federal service. It is usually presented to awardees at the completion of service in EPA (at retirement). It consists of a gold medal, a lapel pin and a certificate. While this award is unranked among EPA Honor Awards; the gold medal is indicative of its importance.

Criteria

There should be evidence of the employee's contribution to EPA. Normally, individuals recommended for this award will have received other recognition during their careers. A Gold Medal Award or nomination by the EPA for high level awards outside the EPA are types of recognition that would justify recommending an employee for this award. The employee's accomplishments should have had impact upon a major organizational segment or a major program. Professional, scientific, or administrative achievements receiving widespread recognition outside EPA are also a basis for nominating an employee for this award.

=== Environmental Protection Agency Paul G. Keough Award for Administrative Excellence ===
This award of the EPA was established in 1994 in honor of Paul G. Keough, former Deputy Regional Administrator and Acting Regional Administrator for Region 1.

Criteria

This award may be given to employees working in clerical, administrative or technical support positions (usually GS-1 through GS-10 and Wage Grade equivalents) who have made contributions to the mission of the EPA that they deserve recognition.

Any one or multiple of the following are used to determine eligibility:

- Use of leadership skills, abilities, or resourcefulness in implementing innovative approaches that resulted in significant improvements to the efficiency of office operations; or organizing, planning, or facilitating activities that promoted EPA special emphasis programs
- Personal diligence or initiative by accepting responsibility for special projects or workload involving difficulties that went well beyond assigned duties and responsibilities.
- Technical expertise and competence in dealing with critical job-related situations.
