= Richard F. Daines =

Commissioner of Health of the State of New York
- In office 2007–2010
- Governor: Eliot Spitzer, David Paterson
- Preceded by: Antonia Novello
- Succeeded by: Nirav R. Shah

Personal details
- Born: February 17, 1951 Preston, Idaho
- Died: February 26, 2011 (aged 60) Dutchess County, New York
- Cause of death: sudden cardiovascular event
- Children: 3
- Education: Cornell University Medical College
- Occupation: Medical administrator
- Profession: physician

Richard Frederick Daines (February 17, 1951 – February 26, 2011) was an American physician and served as the commissioner of the New York State Department of Health from 2007 through 2010. Afterward, he was a visiting scholar at the New York Academy of Medicine, focusing on policies that promote obesity prevention.

Richard Daines was born in Preston, Idaho, and grew up in Logan, Utah. Daines graduated from Utah State University in 1974 and served as a missionary for the Church of Jesus Christ of Latter-day Saints in Bolivia from 1970 to 1972. He then attended medical school at Cornell University Medical College and graduated in 1978. He completed his residency in internal medicine at New York Hospital. He was board certified in internal medicine.

He worked as a physician in New York City for over 25 years. At St. Barnabas Hospital in the Bronx, where he began practicing in 1978, his skills and compassion coupled with his ability to speak fluent Spanish made him a valued member of the staff and a favorite among his patients. In 1994 he became the hospital's senior vice president for professional affairs and medical director.

In 2000, he became medical director at St. Luke's-Roosevelt Hospital Center in Manhattan, and served as president and CEO there from 2002 to 2007. He often worked shifts in the emergency department there to observe first hand the care patients received.

As New York's State Health Commissioner, Daines managed a budget of more than $50 billion and a staff of 6,000. He was a proponent of key state policies to increase coverage for uninsured New Yorkers, improve the safety and quality of health care, and achieve a high-performing health care system. Daines focused national attention on childhood obesity as a public health issue and oversaw implementation of the recommendations of the Commission on Health Care Facilities in the 21st Century, also known as the Berger Commission, which restructured institutional health care. He promoted the development of primary care and patient-centered medical homes and hailed the Adirondack Medical Home initiative in the Adirondacks of northern New York as a national model. He established a new office in the State Health Department to focus on the development and implementation of electronic health records and other health information technology to improve health care delivery in the state.

In 2009, Daines criticized nutritionist and activist Gary Null for his remarks as a keynote speaker at a political rally against mandatory vaccination of health care workers against H1N1 influenza at the New York State Capitol in Albany, New York. Daines said, "Like any number of things he’s wrong about, he’s wrong about that."

A former Scoutmaster who was an Eagle Scout, Daines conducted physicals for scouts and promoted youth health throughout his life. During his tenure as State Health Commissioner, he traveled to all 62 counties of New York State to promote New York's Prevention Agenda toward the Healthiest State and highlight local public health activities, often accompanied by his father, Newell. These activities included dropping rabies vaccine baits from a helicopter over northern New York; hunting disease-carrying mosquitoes in Cicero Swamp near Syracuse; tragging for ticks to highlight the prevention of Lyme disease; promoting pet rabies clinics; highlighting low-fat, nutritious foods served in restaurants; supporting smoke-free outdoor community areas and parks; highlighting fresh fruits and vegetables available through community gardens and local farms; showcasing community efforts to promote physical activity, and encouraging New Yorkers to drink water and low-fat milk in place of high-calorie sugary beverages to prevent overweight and obesity. He was featured in several YouTube videos promoting obesity prevention.

In a farewell message to employees of the New York State Department of Health in December 2010, Daines quoted Hippocrates: "Art (of medicine) is long. Life is short, opportunity fleeting, experiment perilous, judgment difficult."

Daines died at age 60 on February 26, 2011, of a sudden cardiovascular event while working at his farm in Dutchess County, New York. He and his wife of 36 years, Linda, also shared an apartment in Manhattan. He was the father of three children, William, Katherine and Andrew.

Preceded by Antonia Novello	New York's Commissioner of Health; March 21, 2007 – January 24, 2010;	Succeeded by Nirav R. Shah, M.D., M.P.H.
