= Robert A. Whitney =

Surgeon general of the United States

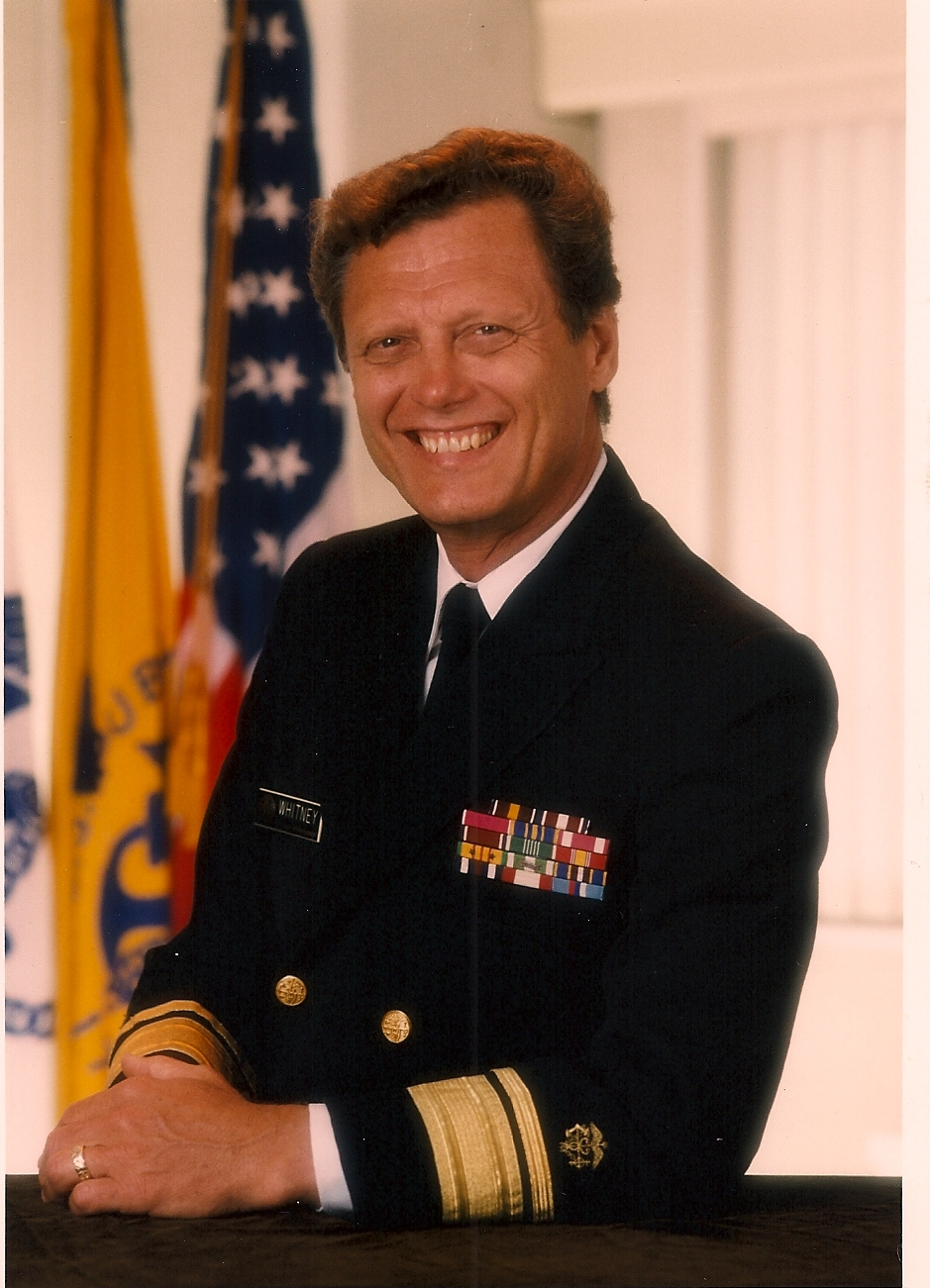

Surgeon General of the United States Acting
- In office July 1, 1993 – September 8, 1993
- President: Bill Clinton
- Preceded by: Antonia Novello
- Succeeded by: Joycelyn Elders

Personal details
- Born: July 27, 1935 (age 90) Oklahoma City, Oklahoma, U.S.

Robert Arthur Whitney Jr. (born July 27, 1935) is an American veterinarian and public health administrator. He served as acting surgeon general of the United States from July to September 1993.

== Biography ==
Whitney was born in Oklahoma City, Oklahoma. He received his Doctor of Veterinary Medicine degree from Oklahoma State University in 1959 and his master's in pharmacology from Ohio State University in 1965.

A career United States Public Health Service officer, Whitney was appointed deputy surgeon general on September 1, 1992. Since 1971, he held a number of positions of increasing responsibility in the National Institutes of Health. From 1989 to 1992, he was director of the NIH National Center for Research Resources.

Prior to joining the PHS, Whitney was director of the U.S. Army training program in laboratory animal medicine and served a year in South Vietnam (1970) as commander of a veterinary medical detachment.

He retired from the USPHS in 1994, and co-founded "Earthspan", a non-profit organization dedicated to advanced technologies to conserve biodiversity, ecosystems, and environmental health. Whitney served as president of Earthspan, until his retirement in 2008.

Whitney is a diplomate of the American College of Laboratory Animal Medicine and served as chief veterinary officer of the Public Health Service from 1985 to 1989. His awards include the U.S. Public Health Service Distinguished Service Medal and the Legion of Merit for his US Army service.
