= Stephen Smith (surgeon) =

American surgeon and public health advocate (1823–1922)

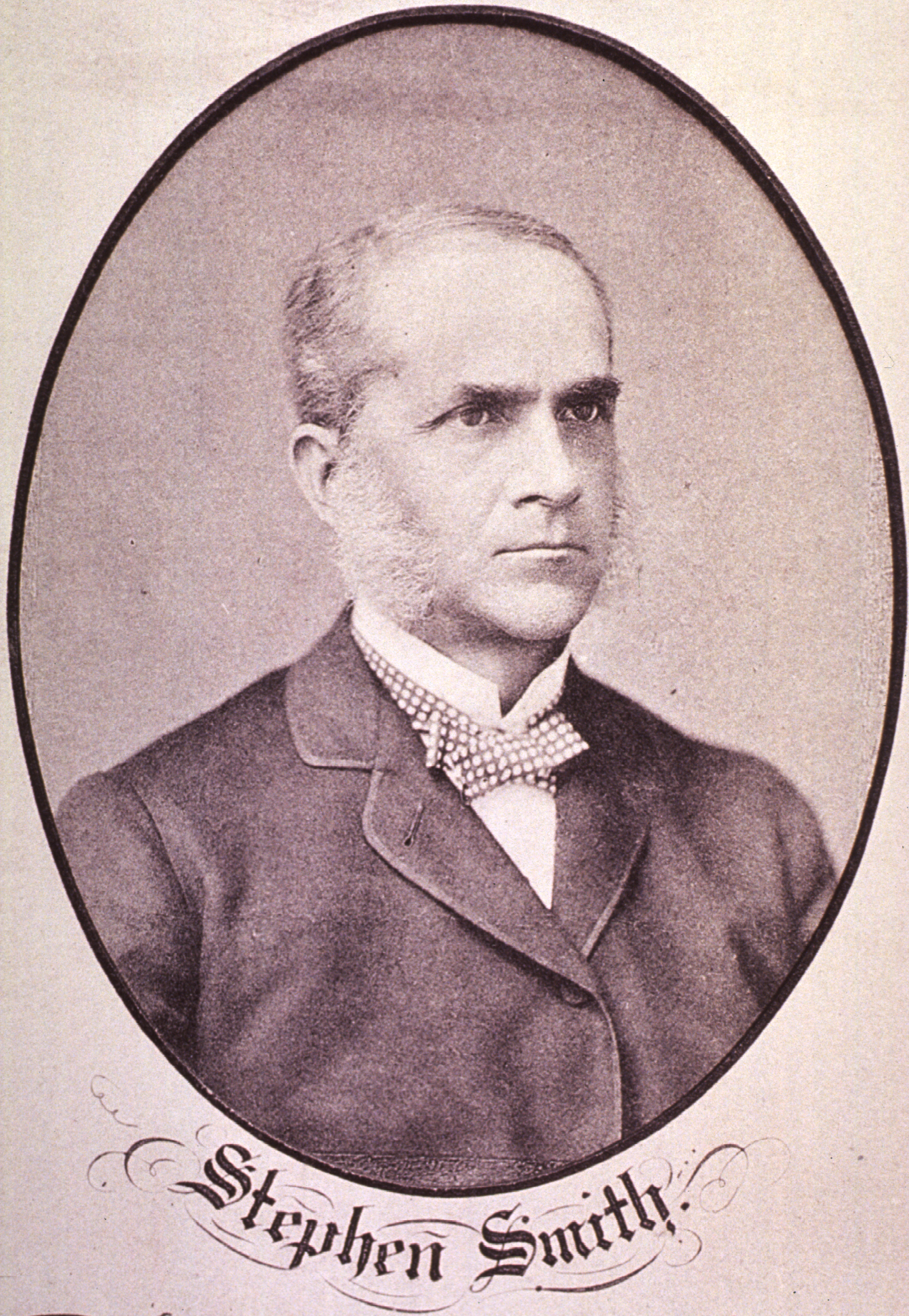
Stephen Smith as first president of the American Public Health Association, 1872–1875

Stephen Smith (February 19, 1823 – August 26, 1922) was a New York City surgeon and civic leader who made important contributions to medical education, nursing education, public health, housing improvement, mental health reform, charity oversight, and urban environmentalism. Smith maintained an active medical practice, was an attending physician at Bellevue Hospital for thirty-seven years, and authored three surgical texts, but he was best known for his public service. Three mayors, seven governors, and two U.S. presidents appointed Smith to almost fifty years of public responsibilities. Shortly before Smith's death in 1922, Columbia University President Nicholas Murray Butler awarded him the school's highest honor and pronounced Smith, “the most interesting figure in American medicine and in American public service today.” The New York Academy of Medicine initiated the annual Stephen Smith Medal for lifetime achievement in public health in 2005.

== Family history, early life, and education ==
Stephen Smith was raised in Spafford, New York, a central New York State farming village, but he was influenced by the social dynamism of the surrounding Burned-over District. His paternal grandfather, Job, was a Continental Army officer during the Revolutionary War. Job moved from Connecticut to New York after the war and settled on lot 74 of central New York's newly created Military Tract in 1806. His son, Lewis, (born in 1786 or 1787) served in the New York militia during the War of 1812. Lewis taught school in Skaneateles, marrying one of his students, Chloe Benson, in 1813. They built a log house next to Job, and Lewis served as a county supervisor, justice of the peace, and sheriff. He was also elected to the New York legislature for three terms. He and Chloe had five children who were born on the family farm near Spafford: Sidney in 1815, Mary in 1816, William in 1819, Stephen in 1823, and Job Lewis in 1827.

Lewis Smith died in 1829 when Stephen was six years old, most likely from typhoid fever and Chloe raised the family with the help of the Thorn Hill Baptist Church and the local common school. These conservative institutions reflected their New England roots; however, Smith was surrounded by the religious upheaval of the Second Great Awakening, the economic and transportation revolutions spawned by the nearby Erie Canal (1825), and the social energies of the abolitionist movement. Smith later recalled that many of his childhood friends left Spafford to become successful politicians, ministers, and teachers. Smith used the Spafford library to teach himself mathematics, geometry, surveying, some trigonometry, then Latin and Greek.

Smith saw Frederick Douglass on a visit to Thorn Hill and joined the anti-slavery Liberty Party in 1844, running for the office of Inspector of Elections. He received two votes, which settled him on politics and rural life: "I left the farm and town soon after and the popular cry, 'Back to the farm,' finds no favorable response on my part."

He took his first steps off the farm in 1845–1846, at age twenty-two, traveling twenty miles south to attend two winter terms at Cortland Academy (later Homer Academy) in Homer, New York. There he met Cortland's young physician lecturer on anatomy and physiology, Caleb Green.

== Medical education and training ==
Smith had a more thorough medical education than the typical apprenticeship and (sometimes) two four-month sessions at a medical college. The reason he usually gave for his career choice, as late as age ninety-five, was that he was too sickly as a youth to do the work of a farmer, making medicine the only option. An alternative explanation from a contemporary was that his elder brother Sidney encouraged him to pursue medicine.

Smith asked Caleb Green to tutor him in medicine in December, 1846, and he enrolled in the Medical Institute of Geneva College in the fall of 1847, where one of his fellow students was Elizabeth Blackwell, the first woman admitted to a regular (allopathic) medical college. Smith did not return to Geneva the following fall. He followed Geneva's charismatic surgery professor, Frank Hastings Hamilton to his office in Buffalo and the new (1846) Buffalo Medical College.

Smith spent the four-month winter term at Buffalo Medical College in 1848–1849, where Hamilton was Professor of Surgery and Austin Flint was Dean and Professor of Medicine. Both men were data-collectors and well-acquainted with the work of French physician Pierre Louis and his numerical method. Smith followed their examples in his surgical and civic work. During the summer cholera epidemic of 1849, Smith and Hamilton cared for patients at Buffalo's Sisters of Charity Hospital.

Smith went to Manhattan in the fall of 1849 for a third four-month academic session at The College of Physicians and Surgeons (now Columbia University Vagelos College of Physicians and Surgeons), listing Hamilton as his preceptor and receiving his diploma in 1850. Shortly afterward, he obtained a house officer position at Bellevue Hospital. During his time at Bellevue, Smith began his seventy-year literary career by publishing a review of seventy-eight cases of urinary bladder rupture.

== Surgical and academic career ==
Smith became a successful New York City surgeon and medical educator. He finished his Bellevue house officer duties in 1852 and was appointed attending surgeon at Bellevue Hospital in 1854, a position he held until 1891. The Boston Medical and Surgical Journal (now The New England Journal of Medicine) pronounced him one of New York's up and coming young physicians in 1858.

Smith did not enlist during the Civil War, but in 1862 he published his 279-page, pocket-sized Hand-book of Surgical Operations, which became the Union Army's surgical field manual and likely contributed to the now recognized improvements in Civil War medical outcomes. That same year, he traveled to the Virginia swamps during the Peninsula Campaign of 1862, where he was appalled by the military's dismal sanitation and the reckless surgery of many Northern volunteer surgeons. Smith also volunteered at the Union Army's Central Park Hospital, where he developed a lower extremity amputation procedure that became the surgical standard in the United States and England for the next fifty years.

Smith helped start Bellevue Medical College (now NYU Grossman School of Medicine), in 1861, receiving his first academic appointment as the school's professor of the principles of surgery. He served as the Medical College's professor of anatomy from 1863 to 1872 and developed a respected teaching approach that discouraged memorization and encouraged students to visualize the body as a machine they should construct from scratch.

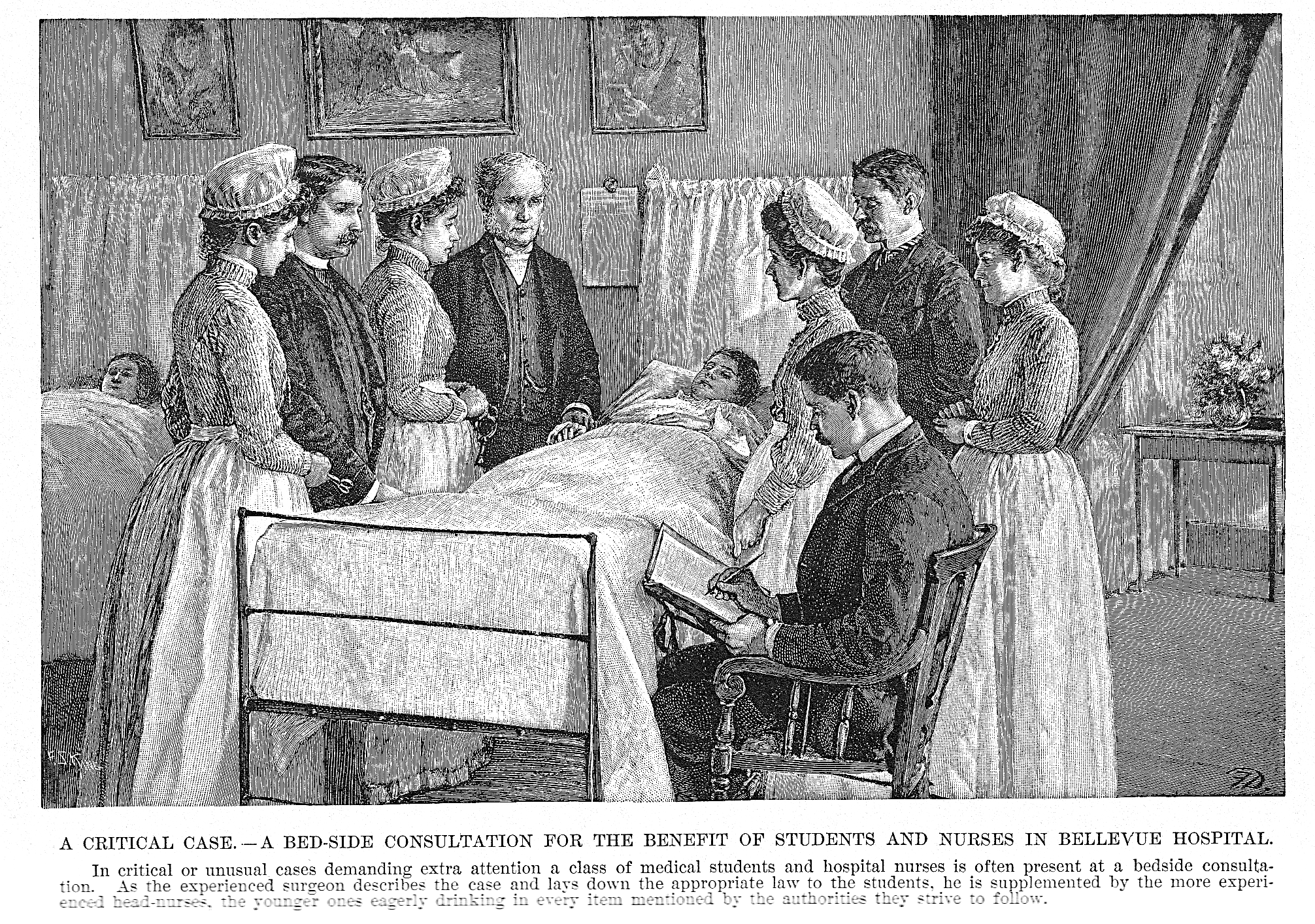
Stephen Smith (center) age 72 at patient's bedside in Bellevue

According to Smith, but also Walsh, Smith was the first to use antisepsis and asepsis at Bellevue Hospital in 1875–1876. Harris argues that Smith was the one who taught Joseph Lister's antiseptic techniques to a young William Halsted, later one of the pioneers of modern American surgery.

Smith maintained a busy medical life into his eighties despite his civic obligations. He was professor of orthopedic surgery at the Medical Department of the University of the City of New York (also now NYU Grossman School of Medicine) from 1874 to 1882 and clinical professor of surgery there from 1874 to 1894. He was a consulting surgeon to St. Vincent's, Bellevue, and Columbus Hospitals until 1911. Medical historian and U.S. Army physician Fielding Garrison named Smith the “Nestor of American Surgeons” in 1917. Smith said in 1918, reflecting on his many other achievements, "My steadfast aim and purpose has been to succeed as a practiser [sic] and teacher of the science and art of surgery."

=== Support for women physicians ===
Smith was a lifelong advocate for women physicians, often helping behind the scenes. Being raised by a woman may have made him more tolerant than other physicians, but Smith came of age in a time and place that was home to the American Woman's Rights movement, which was closely tied to the abolitionist movement he favored. When Elizabeth Blackwell arrived at his medical college in 1847, he quickly accepted her, and Blackwell added his reminiscences to her 1895 autobiography.

Blackwell's medical school success settled the question of women in medicine for Smith. He editorialized in February 1861 that, "public opinion, of course, sets strongly in favor of the medical education of females", and that Blackwell's example should force the American Medical Association to amend its code of ethics to, "recognize properly educated female physicians as practitioners in good and lawful standing."

Smith supported Blackwell's efforts to open a woman's medical college in Manhattan in 1868 by serving as one of its examiners. After Elizabeth left for England in 1869, he continued to serve as an examiner for her sister Emily for almost twenty years. He argued strongly for women physicians in his first Lunacy Commissioner report in 1882 and proudly announced that New York's Willard Asylum had added a female physician to its staff in 1885.

=== Support for women nurses ===
Smith was also a supporter of women nurses, who, like women physicians, were often opposed by male doctors. He editorialized several times on behalf of women nurses during the Civil War, citing the women-led Sisters of Charity Hospital in Buffalo as one that, "has no equal in this country." He helped Louisa Lee Schuyler start the country's first nursing school at Bellevue Hospital in 1872 and was an examiner for the Bellevue School of Nursing. Smith assured Bellevue's nursing graduates in 1903 that the introduction of trained nurses was the greatest advance he had witnessed in medicine.

=== Hospital design ===
Smith was a respected voice in mid-century hospital design. He encouraged sanitary principles and plain buildings based on the pavilion system during the Civil War, citing Florence Nightingale's hospital experience in Crimea. The United States Sanitary Commission asked Smith to inspect Union Army hospitals in the District of Columbia in 1862. The trustees of Roosevelt Hospital (now Mount Sinai West) sought his counsel on their hospital's construction in 1865. The Roosevelt trustees placed a copy of his recommendations in the new hospital's cornerstone in 1869.

The trustees of the Johns Hopkins Hospital asked Smith and four others to offer suggestions for their proposed hospital in 1875. The Boston Medical and Surgical Journal reviewed the final reports and found that Smith brought, "a ripeness of experience and a breadth of research which make his paper exceedingly instructive to the sanitary student." The Hopkins trustees ultimately chose John Shaw Billings to advise them, but Billings was not satisfied with his own work and incorporated ideas from Smith and the others in his final design.

== Public health ==
Smith became one of the seminal leaders of nineteenth-century American public health while still pursuing his medical career. He was a frequent critic of New York City's corrupt and inefficient sanitation efforts before the Civil War, but reformers brought him into the daily business of public health in 1864. Smith managed a landmark block-by-block sanitary survey of Manhattan for the Citizens’ Association, the results of which encouraged the New York legislature to remove health department responsibilities from New York City and create a four-county Metropolitan Board of Health in 1866.

Governor Reuben Fenton appointed Smith to the Metropolitan Board of Health in 1868, Smith's first public appointment. The legislature returned local health department control to New York City in 1870, and Mayor Oakey Hall appointed Smith a City Health Board sanitary commissioner. Smith remained a New York City health commissioner until 1875.

Smith called a small meeting of sanitarians in his office in 1872 to discuss a national organization that could support his and others’ public health efforts. This led to the formation of the American Public Health Association later that year, which named Smith its first president. Smith and Association secretary, Elisha Harris, launched the organization's journal in 1875 with $1,000 of their own money.

Smith left the city health department and his American Public Health Association presidential post in 1875, but re-engaged with public health in 1878 by drafting a bill to create a national board of health. Congress approved a National Board of Health in 1879 and President Rutheford Hayes appointed Smith a member. However, the National Board was weaker than Smith had wanted, and its leaders were prone to battling with other government entities. Congress ceased funding it in 1883.

At the National Board's urging, Smith worked to create a New York State Board of Health in 1879. Smith helped draft enabling legislation, encouraged physicians to get behind the law, and lobbied legislators. This led to formation of a state health board in 1880 (now the New York State Department of Health).

Smith spoke and consulted on public health for the next fifteen years, although he was busy with other civic work during much of this time. President Grover Cleveland named Smith a delegate to the 1894 Ninth International Sanitary Conference in Paris, which Smith considered, “the final act of my service in the field of public health.”

Smith wrote The City That Was in 1911 to give a first-hand account of the establishment of the Metropolitan Board of Health in 1866 and show twentieth-century readers how far public health had come. He remained disappointed that the American Public Health Association, despite his multiple urgings, never supported a strong national health department.

=== Housing reform ===
Smith worked to make housing reform a part of public health's mandate, providing momentum for changes that occurred later in the century. He editorialized in American Medical Times that the 1863 draft riots, “proceeded from those districts of the city notorious for their filthy and unpoliced streets, and wretched and uninhabitable tenement houses,” concluding, “The great and patent prevention for riots like that which we have witnessed is radical reform of the homes of the poor.”

As a health commissioner, Smith sought to convince the City Health Department to issue tighter building standards and to facilitate the construction of new housing for the poor using public and philanthropic funds. He also encouraged relocation of the poor by providing cheap public transit. These steps, which were later enacted, were far more than the Tenement House Act of 1867 and the Tenement House Act of 1879 provided.

== Mental health ==
Smith served as State Commissioner in Lunacy from 1882 to 1888, then addressed New York's systemic mental health problems in 1889–1890 by helping create its state hospital system. His organizational and data-gathering skills proved to be a good fit for New York's dire mental health needs.

William Pryor Letchworth, the State Board of Charities president, toured European asylums in 1880 and concluded, "In this age of high-pressure living, there is perhaps no subject of more general or more urgent interest than that of insanity and its relations to the State." Governor Alonzo Cornell appointed Smith to Letchworth's State Board of Charities in 1881 (renamed the State Board of Social Welfare in 1929), a semi-official volunteer organization that oversaw all of New York's publicly supported institutions except prisons. Cornell named Smith State Commissioner in Lunacy in 1882, a salaried position reporting to the Board that was charged with inspecting all facilities incarcerating New York's insane persons and adjudicating inmate complaints. At the time, New York had 10 percent of the country's population but housed 20 percent of the nation's institutionalized insane.

Smith made sixty-seven unannounced visits to thirty-nine separate institutions in his first seven months as Lunacy Commissioner. He collected data during his tenure, described what he found, and made recommendations, but he avoided a heavy bureaucratic hand. He wrote in his 1884 annual report: "Reforms affected by persuasion and appeals to the humanity, and especially the good sense of keepers, [are] more effective and more lasting than when enforced by the arbitrary power of law." The country's alienists (psychiatrists), who supervised its asylums, made him an honorary member of their national association in 1885. The editor of The Medico-Legal Journal wrote about Smith's first three Lunacy Commissioner reports that, "They now furnish by far the most reliable data as to the actual condition of the insane in public and private institutions that we can have access to in the State of New York." The Journal's biggest concern, after the poor state of insanity care, was that Smith's job was too much for one person.

Smith pointed to successes in 1888: mechanical restraints had virtually disappeared, mental patients had more liberty, state asylums had schools for patients and training for attendants, there was finally a female physician in the state system, and many patients who were seen early in their disease were being returned to society. Former American Psychiatric Association president Edward Brush, who walked the Utica Asylum (now Utica Psychiatric Center) grounds with Smith as a young alienist, acknowledged in 1922 that the internal changes Smith put in place between 1882 and 1888 were the administrative backbone of New York's state hospital system.

Smith wanted to make indigent mentally ill persons wards of the state and, where possible, transfer them to the newer and more professionally-run state asylums. He led a group of reformers that passed laws creating a three-person State Lunacy Commission in 1889 (now the New York State Hospital Commission) and the State Care Act of 1890, which transferred all publicly financed mental health care to the state. The State Care Act proved to be a pivotal national event. Johns Hopkins psychiatry professor Henry Hurd wrote in 1916 that New York's actions, "unquestionably gave great impetus to the [state care] movement, which has since spread to other states with comparative rapidity."

Smith wrote Who Is Insane in 1916 as a look back on his time as Lunacy Commissioner, a reflection of how he felt mental illness should be managed, and a commentary on how things had gone. He maintained that institutional care could return many mentally ill and disabled persons to society, but this had not happened because managers had abandoned inexpensive individualized dwellings for ever-larger centralized facilities, "thus reducing the entire population to the common level of a custodial institution." Smith rejected the rising tide of eugenics. He stated that forced sterilization for preventing mental illness and disability was a procedure that, "is naturally shocking to the moral sense and must be attended with serious difficulties."

== Charity oversight ==
Governor Roswell Flower re-appointed Smith to the State Board of Charities in 1893, which became Smith's organizational home for the next twenty-five years. Much of Smith's daily Board of Charities work was personally inspecting or managing inspections of facilities that cared for delinquent, blind, epileptic, consumptive, or mentally defective state inmates; however, his more lasting contribution was in helping organize New York's public medical care delivery system.

Smith directed the Board's work on medical charities and hospitals. The medical charity issue hit the headlines in 1894 when George Shrady, launched a magazine attack against free hospitals and dispensaries because they deprived hard-working doctors of a fair income. The Board agreed with Shrady that some charitable dispensaries were providing care to persons who could otherwise afford to pay, and asked Smith to investigate in 1896.

Smith was less concerned with physician income than social science arguments that poorly-designed charities could lead to chronic pauperism. He advised the Board that English experience showed that free medical care could lead to permanent dependency and the solution was more control of dispensaries. The state legislature passed a law granting the Board of Charities licensing power over dispensaries in 1899, which Smith implemented. He moved cautiously, collecting and supplying data while enforcing the new rules and seeking to avoid embarrassment. Smith was satisfied by 1903 that the licensing law was working because dispensary use was no longer increasing faster than population growth, and he stopped worrying about the issue. Practicing doctors saw it differently and continued complaining that charitable dispensaries were stealing their paying patients for the next two decades.

Smith brought hospitals under the Board's purview, establishing a precedent for New York's first in the country certificate of need law in 1964. The Board had authority to approve and inspect hospitals that treated charity patients, but it had not used this power before Smith's arrival. Smith organized a Board hospital committee in 1895 and began inspecting the state's hospitals. His major conclusion was that New York's general hospitals served valuable social and medical purposes, but their quality and viability were threatened because there were too many hospitals for the existing need. Smith wrote: "whenever application is made for its approval of the certificate of incorporation of a new hospital, careful personal inquiry should be made by the Commissioner to whom the reference is made to determine the need of a hospital in the proposed locality and the qualifications of its projectors to organize and manage it." Smith used the Board's authority to deny two New York City hospitals in 1899.

Smith developed a comprehensive plan to re-organize New York City's disjointed public hospital system in 1907. He wanted a single Department of Public Hospitals and Commissioner of Public Hospitals to replace three overlapping regulatory bodies. He argued that public hospitals should be built where they were needed and managed by local districts. The mayor's Commission on Hospitals adopted Smith's recommendations in 1909, but New York City did not implement them until 1929, when mayor Jimmy Walker created a citywide Department of Hospitals.

== Urban environmentalism – street trees ==
Smith argued for street trees as a public health measure to reduce summer heat and save lives in 1872. He pushed this idea as cities cut down trees and paved their way into the twentieth century. He got a law passed in 1902 and fought to get it enforced in 1914 that made New York City's street trees a public responsibility.

The New York City Board of Health asked Commissioner Smith to investigate the well-known summer increase in death rates and recommend measures to reduce mortality in 1871. Smith responded with a tightly written report the following year, the essence of which was that Manhattan was becoming hotter due to urbanization, and excessive heat was the primary cause of the rise in summer deaths. The challenges were to curb temperature extremes and improve air quality, and his primary recommendation was more shade trees, managed by the Department of Public Parks (now the New York City Department of Parks and Recreation).

Newspapers throughout the country cited Smith's advice on the health benefits of urban trees, but New York City took no action. The city continued removing street trees as it paved roads, built underground lines and vaults, and erected taller buildings during the rest of the century.

Tree advocates got New York to enact an Arbor Day in 1889, but Smith favored government action, not voluntarism. He prepared a legislative bill giving the City Parks Department control of New York City's street trees in 1899, which he supported with a publicity campaign based on his 1872 Board of Health work. Albany enacted his bill in 1902, recognizing Smith's public health argument, "An Act to extend the jurisdiction of the park board of the city of New York to the preservation, planting and cultivation of trees and vegetation in the streets thereof for the purpose of improving the public health." However, Smith's 1902 street tree law stayed on the books with no action for twelve years.

Smith was president of the city Tree Planting Association in 1914 and launched a publicity campaign to shame the Parks Department into enforcing his 1902 law. He arranged for the new State College of Forestry at Syracuse (now the State University of New York College of Environmental Science and Forestry) to do a brief survey of Manhattan's street trees for the Tree Planting Association, which proved to be the turning point. The City Parks Department commissioned the College of Forestry to prepare a more comprehensive report the following summer, which was Manhattan's first tree census. This report, prepared by a young Laurie Davidson Cox and financed by John D. Rockefeller, set the Parks Department on its current path by documenting the state of the city's street trees and recommending a comprehensive approach to urban reforestation.

== Literary career ==
Between 1851 and 1922, Smith published two medical journals, six books and hundreds of articles, speeches, and official reports. Smith became the editor and proprietor of the bimonthly New York Journal of Medicine in 1857. He closed this journal and started the weekly American Medical Times in 1860, which lasted until 1864. Smith was the sole editor during most of Medical Times’ existence and he typically wrote at least one editorial for each issue. He collected fifty-eight of his articles and editorials for his 1872 book, Doctor in Medicine, which allows some cross-reference with his Medical Times editorials. In addition to his unsigned Medical Times editorials, he was the anonymous New York correspondent for the English medical journal The Lancet from 1878 to 1906.

Smith authored a 279-page Hand-Book of Surgical Operations in May 1862, which went through five printings and became the Union Army's surgical handbook during the Civil War. He wrote a general surgical text in 1879, Manual of the Principles and Practice of Operative Surgery, and a second edition of this work in 1887. See below for a list of Smith's published books and book chapters.

== Personal life ==
Smith married Lucy (Lucie) Culver (1835–1905), daughter of Brooklyn judge and well-known abolitionist Erastus D. Culver, on June 1, 1858. They had nine children, three of whom died in infancy. Stephen and Lucy named their first child Florence Nightingale Smith (1861) and their other children after family members.

Smith and his family lived in Manhattan for most of his life, typically in rented apartments. He sent Lucy and his children to his father-in-law's upstate residence in Greenwich, New York, during the summer and in later years bought a lake house in Skaneateles. He never acquired the wealth of a Manhattan carriage-trade physician. When he died in 1922, his estate was worth less than $30,000.

Those who knew him best were most impressed by Smith's intellect and his even disposition. A contemporary physician described him in 1866: "As an operator, he is confident without being presumptuous, neat without being fastidious, and careful without being timid." New York State Board of Charities president William Rhinelander Stewart spent thousands of miles in Smith's company and commented that Smith took the tedious work seriously and calmly, "Never too late, never too early, and always even tempered."

Smith often worked in the background during his younger years, letting his writing speak for him and giving credit to others, which he did in creating the New York State Board of Health in 1879. As he passed into the role of elder statesman, he was more willing to don the visible mantle of public and mental health cheerleader, writing books and granting newspaper interviews. He died of general debility at his daughter Florence's home in Montour Falls, New York, on August 26, 1922, six months short of his one-hundredth birthday.

== Books and book chapters ==
- Smith, S. (1862) Hand-Book of Surgical Operations. 1st ed. New York, NY: Baillière Brothers.
- Smith, S. (1872) Doctor in Medicine: And Other Papers on Professional Subjects. New York, NY: William Wood & Co.
- Smith, S. (1880) Manual of the Principles and Practice of Operative Surgery. Boston, MA: Houghton, Osgood and Company
- Smith, S. (1887) The Principles and Practice of Operative Surgery. Philadelphia: Lea Brothers & Co.
- Smith, S. (1889) "Surgical Diseases of Early Childhood". In: Hirst B. C., ed. A System of Obstetrics by American Authors. Vol 2. Philadelphia, PA: Lea Brothers & Co.
- Hamilton, F. H., Smith, S. (1891) A Practical Treatise on Fractures and Dislocations. Philadelphia, PA: Lea Brothers & Co.
- Smith, S. (1906) "The Evolution of American Surgery". In: Bryant J. D., Buck A. H., eds. American Practice of Surgery. Vol. 1. New York, NY: William Wood and Company.
- Smith, S. (1911) The City That Was. New York, NY: Frank Allaben.
- Smith, S, (1911) "The Law in Its Relations to the Practice of Surgery". In: Bryant J. D., Buck A. H., eds. American Practice of Surgery. New York, NY: William Wood and Company.
- Smith, S. (1911) Who Is Insane? New York, NY: The Macmillan Company; 1916.

== See also ==
- History of public health in New York City
