= Daniel Lewis (physician) =

American physician

- Born: January 17, 1846; Alfred, New York
- Died: March 22, 1919 (aged 73); Alfred, New York
- Education: Alfred University, New York University Medical School, College of Physicians and Surgeons
- Occupation: Physician
- Known for: First Commissioner of the New York State Department of Health
- Spouse: Achsah D. Vaughn (m. 1872)
- Awards: Honorary Doctor of Philosophy (1886), Honorary Doctor of Laws (1902)

Daniel Lewis (January 17, 1846 – March 22, 1919) was an American physician who served as the first Commissioner of the New York State Department of Health.

== Life ==
Lewis was born on January 17, 1846, in Alfred, New York, the son of Alfred Lewis and Lucy Langworthy.

Lewis was attending Alfred Academy when the American Civil War started, and he served in the Union Navy from 1864 to 1865. After the War, he returned to his studies, graduating from Alfred University in 1869. He then attended a course in the New York University Medical School, followed by the College of Physicians and Surgeons. He graduated from the latter school in 1871. After practicing medicine in Andover for two years, he opened an office in New York City and became a prominent physician and surgeon in the city.

When the New York Skin and Cancer Hospital opened, Lewis was made assistant surgeon and then visiting surgeon. In 1890, he was appointed chair of special surgery (cancerous diseases) of the New York Post-Graduate Medical School. He was also surgeon of the Brooklyn Trust Hospital, department of skin diseases and cancer. He joined the New York County Medical Society in 1873, and served on its board of assessors for five years, a delegate to the State Medical Society, president of the society from 1884 to 1885, and editor of its publication Medical Directory. In 1880, he was made a fellow of the New York Academy of Medicine and the New York Pathological Society. He was a member of the New York Dermatological Society. He was president of the Medical Society of the State of New York and the Physicians' Mutual Aid Association. He also spent time studying his speciality in the Cancer Hospital in London.

In 1895, Lewis was appointed Commissioner of the New York State Board of Health. He was then elected president of the board 1901, when the Board of Health was replaced with the Department of Health and he became its Commissioner. He served as Commissioner until 1905. He wrote a number of articles on medical subjects over the years, mainly related to cancer. In 1895, he founded The American Medical Review, serving as its editor and proprietor for fifteen years. It later was renamed Medical Review of Reviews.

Lewis was a member of the Union League Club. He was an active member and surgeon of the Grand Army of the Republic, serving as medical director of the Department of New York with the rank of brigadier-general in 1887. He was an organizer and first president of the Alumni Association of Alfred University and founder of the university's library. The university gave him an honorary Doctor of Philosophy degree in 1886, followed by an honorary Doctor of Laws degree in 1902. He was also a trustee and medical advisor of the university. In 1872, he married Achsah D. Vaughn of Springville.

Lewis died at his home in Alfred on March 22, 1919. He was buried in the Alfred Rural Cemetery.
