= Wadsworth Center =

Public health laboratory in Albany, New York

- Motto: Science in the pursuit of health
- Established: 1901
- Research type: Public health
- Director: Leonard Peruski
- Faculty: 100
- Staff: 1000
- Location: Empire State Plaza, Albany, New York, 12237; 42.648877°N 73.760037°W
- Operating agency: New York State Department of Health
- Website: www.wadsworth.org

The Wadsworth Center, located in Albany, New York, United States, is the research-intensive public health laboratory of the New York State Department of Health.

== History ==
The Wadsworth Center, originally the New York State's Antitoxin Laboratory, was established in 1901. Its mission was to standardize and manufacture antitoxin, which was for the treatment of communicable diseases such as diphtheria and anthrax. In 1914, the Antitoxin Laboratory was designated the Division of Laboratories and Research. At the same time, Augustus B. Wadsworth was named director and he served until 1945.

In 1974, Enzo Paoletti joined the Wadsworth Center and with Dennis Panicali devised a strategy to produce DNA vaccines by using genetic engineering to transform ordinary smallpox vaccine into vaccines that may be able to prevent other diseases. In four seminal papers they provided the technology and proof of principle to construct vaccines using genetically engineered poxviruses, altering the DNA of cowpox virus by inserting a gene from other viruses, namely Herpes simplex virus, hepatitis B and influenza.

== Today ==
The Wadsworth Center has over 100 principal investigators and more than 1,000 staff in five locations, the Biggs Laboratory (at the Empire State Plaza), the David Axelrod Institute (on New Scotland Avenue), the Center for Medical Science, Western Avenue and, in nearby Guilderland, New York, the Griffin Laboratory. Scientists at the Wadsworth Center study public health issues, such as drug resistance to emerging infections, environmental exposures, and basic biological processes that contribute to human health and disease. Additionally, as the state's public health reference laboratory, the Wadsworth Center is responsible for responding to public health threats, developing methods to detect microbes and genetic disorders, measuring and analyzing environmental chemicals, and licensing clinical and environmental laboratories. In conjunction with the University at Albany, SUNY, the Wadsworth Center has training programs for undergraduates, graduates, and postdoctoral fellows.
