= Justin B. Dimick =

American physician

- Born: 1973 (age 52–53) (Note: In 2012, Dimick was reported to be 39); Randolph, Vermont
- Spouse: Anastasia
- Children: 2

Academic background
- Education: Cornell University (BS); Johns Hopkins School of Medicine (MD); Geisel School of Medicine at Dartmouth (MPH)

Justin Brigham Dimick (born 1973) is an American surgeon. He is the Frederick A. Coller Distinguished Professor of Surgery and Chair of the Department of Surgery at the University of Michigan.

== Early life and education ==
Dimick was born and raised in Randolph, Vermont, to parents Steve and Nancy Dimick. He attended Randolph Union High School before enrolling at Cornell University for his Bachelor of Science degree in biology. While attending Cornell, he competed on their varsity wrestling team and won a Greco-Roman varsity wrestling championship. From there, he earned his medical degree at Johns Hopkins School of Medicine in 2000 and his Master's degree from Dartmouth College's Geisel School of Medicine in 2005.

While completing his surgical residency at Michigan Medicine, Dimick was the only medical student to receive a 2001 research citation from the Society of Critical Care Medicine. He earned the award for his research as a medical student at Johns Hopkins University where he showed that "patients who receive care at hospitals that have ICUs staffed by board-certified critical care physicians have a four-fold reduction in perioperative mortality."

== Career ==
Upon completing his surgical residency at the University of Michigan Medical School, Dimick joined their faculty in 2007. In the role of assistant professor, he co-authored a study with John D. Birkmeyer which was aimed at redefining the criteria of "good" and "bad" hospitals beyond their mortality rate. He was also appointed to sit on the various boards such as the Leapfrog Group, the Institute of Medicine, the Measurement and Evaluation committee of the National Surgical Quality Improvement Program, and the executive committee of the Surgical Outcomes Club. As a result of his research, Dimick was named to the editorial board for the journal The Archives of Surgery in 2009.

By 2012, Dimick was promoted to Full professor and named the Henry King Ransom professor of surgery at the Michigan Medicine. That same year, he edited Clinical Scenarios in Surgery: Decision Making and Operative Technique which was published by Lippincott. In this role, Dimick was named an associate editor for the journal Annals of Surgery.

Prior to earning the appointment of Frederick A. Coller Distinguished Professor of Surgery and Chair of the Department of Surgery, Dimick led various studies on quality and care in hospitals. He worked with an initiative called the National Surgical Quality Improvement Program (ACS-NSQIP) to conclude that quality reporting in hospitals were not accurate enough to improve their quality of surgical safety or save costs. The study examined 263 hospitals and analyzed data from over 1,000 seniors enrolled in Medicare who had a major operation at those hospitals. The following year, Dimick was a senior author on a study which found, through analyzing 1.6 million hospital stays, that rural hospitals tended to be safer and less expensive for routine operations. He also focused on weight loss surgeries and complications and published a study in JAMA Surgery which found that poor surgical skills during bariatric surgery could lead to bleeding and infection once the operation is over.

On May 16, 2019, Dimick was appointed the Frederick A. Coller Distinguished Professor of Surgery and Chair of the Department of Surgery. In this role, he sat on the Association for Women Surgeons' "HeForShe" committee with Lesly Dossett and Chelsea Harris which aimed at encouraging male doctors to use their positions of power to advocate for women's issues. Dimick also was a senior author on a study which raised concern over the increase of robots in surgical rooms. He found that 73 hospitals across Michigan used robots to perform common operations and called for more oversight and policies regarding their use. The following year, he was elected a Member of the National Academy of Medicine for "his leadership in elevating the science of health care policy evaluation, quality measurement and comparative effectiveness research within surgical populations."

== Personal life ==
Dimick is married to Anastasia and they have two children together.
