= Metropolitan Board of Health =

The New York City Metropolitan Board of Health was the first modern municipal public health authority in the United States. It was founded in 1866 by the New York City Common Council at a suggestion by the New York Academy of Medicine, following a campaign led by Dr. Stephen Smith.

The several powers and duties of the health officers are set forth in detail in chapter xix of the first charter creating the City of Greater New York (January 1, 1898; amended, 1901). In 1915 the health department was administered by a board of health, consisting of a commissioner appointed by the mayor, the commissioner of police, and the health officer of the port.

== History ==
The Board of Health, later known as the Metropolitan Board of Health began after the American Civil War on February 18, 1865, when the first Report of the Council of Hygiene and Public Health of the Citizens' Association of New York (known as Citizen's Association Report on the Sanitary Condition of the City) was written:

We, the citizens of Lower East Manhattan, declare that this city is unsuitable for human development, child development and moral development. We, citizens of all classes, have suffered from deadly diseases such as cholera, tuberculosis, small pox and pneumonia at the hands of public officials who scoff at our sufferings. We believe that housing, politics, morals and health are all intertwined and without one, we would be quite at a loss.

The board's formation was in part a response to the New York City draft riots, the council would state:

"...[t]he mobs that held fearful sway in our city during the memorable outbreak of violence in the month of July, 1863, were gathered in the overcrowded and neglected quarters of the city."

— Council of Hygiene, Report Upon the Sanitary Condition of the City, 1865

Poor sanitation and filthy streets threatened both the physical health of the public as well as the economic welfare of the developing metropolis in the mid nineteenth century.

The sanitation of the city went under city politics. Most of city sewage and welfare in New York City was headed by Tammany Hall. In 1863 Tammany Hall nominated City Street Inspector Francis I. A. Boole for mayor. Reformists discovered that street cleaning was deeply embedded in corruption. Workers were paid by Tammany Hall below minimum wage and forced to sign contracts that gave up half of their paycheck to Boole.

After the release of the Citizens Association Report in late 1865, the new board began to manage New York City's worst environmental problems.

The Board of Health in New York, inspected at least 500 factories in the area and demanded that the factory owners decrease the amount of toxic air they released which they say was becoming a major health risk as well as the dirty tenements that contained new immigrants into the area.

A Health official in 1866 wrote of the tenements in a 300-page document, entitled Inspection of Tenement living:

The streets were uncleaned; manure heaps containing thousands of tons, occupied piers and vacant lots; sewers were obstructed; houses were crowded, and badly ventilated, and lighted; privies were unconnected with the sewers, and overflowing; stables and yards were filled with stagnant water, and many dark and damp cellars were inhabited. The streets were obstructed, and the wharves and piers were filthy and dangerous from dilapidation; cattle were driven through the streets at all hours of the day in large numbers, and endangered the lives of the people.

The Board of Health helped encourage scientists and doctors to help cure diseases as well as join reformers in bringing attention to tenement law and work laws. By 1915 many of the powers originally possessed by the health department as to tenement houses had been transferred to the tenement-house department, which was charged with enforcing the tenement-house law in all flats and apartments.

== See also ==
- Metropolitan Health Bill
- New York City Department of Health and Mental Hygiene
- History of public health in the United States#Metropolitan Board of Health in New York City
