= Ashland oil spill =

Oil spillage incident in the United States

The Ashland oil spill was an oil spill into the Monongahela River that occurred on January 2, 1988, near the town of Jefferson Hills, Pennsylvania, approximately 20 miles upstream from the city of Pittsburgh.

== Cause ==
Ashland Oil Company Inc. (currently known as Ashland Inc.) owned a facility near the Monongahela River in Jefferson, PA (now Jefferson Hills). On January 2, 1988, a four-million gallon tank was used for the first time after being dismantled (from an Ohio location) and rebuilt in Pennsylvania. It was this tank, holding approximately 3.5 million gallons of diesel oil, that failed and collapsed, dumping nearly 1 million gallons of the oil into a storm sewer that led to the Monongahela River. At 4:58pm, a worker checked the tank levels and verified the tank was almost full. At 5:02, when the worker was walking away from the tank, he heard a loud boom and turned to find the roof of the tank collapsed. Ashland Co. later took full responsibility for the incident, accepting that they did violate industry standards when reconstructing the tank.

A team of researchers ultimately discovered that a dime-sized flaw on the 45-year-old tank contributed to the rupture. The flaw, which consisted of a small, rusting cavity about 0.125 in. deep was caused by a torch and was in the steel before reassembly. A combination of factors aggravated the flaw and caused the tank to split. The tank was assembled in Cleveland in 1940 and rebuilt in 1985. The original welds and those used during the reassembly made the tank's steel walls more brittle. Other contributing factors were the relative weakness of the World War II steel, pressure from the diesel fuel, and cold weather.

== Effects ==
From the Monongahela River, the oil made its way down into the Ohio River, contaminating the drinking water for about 1 million people throughout Ohio, West Virginia, and Pennsylvania. About 23,000 residents of Pittsburgh were without water for a week. About 1,200 residents of Jefferson Borough were asked to evacuate due to fear of an explosion in the area from a gasoline leak. Water shortages occurred for areas as far as 200 miles down river. This oil spill was one of the largest inland oil spills at the time of occurrence. The U.S. Government estimated the cost of damages were between $10 and $15 million.

Wildlife in the region were harmed by the oil as well. Fish and mussels were affected as well as 2,000-4,000 water fowl were killed in the incident.

== Response and cleanup ==
The first Federal government agents on scene were the United States Coast Guard, and the Environmental Protection Agency acted as on scene coordinators throughout the cleanup process. Multiple obstacles were faced throughout the cleanup efforts. First, major water shortages down river placed potable water in high demand. Also, cold temperatures caused freezing and extreme conditions throughout the river, hindering the cleanup process. Lastly, the river itself had few access points, making it difficult to bring in heavy equipment for cleanup in certain parts of the river. Out of the approximate 1 million gallons spilled, about 200,000 gallons were recovered in the process.

The following agencies took part in the cleanup process:

- U.S. Coast Guard (Second and Fifth District, MSO Pittsburgh, National Strike Force LANTAREA Strike Team)
- U.S. Environmental Protection Agency (Regions III, IV, V)
- U.S. Army Corps of Engineers (Pittsburgh, Cincinnati, Huntington, Louisville)
- U.S. Department of Interior (Philadelphia, Chicago)
- National Oceanic and Atmospheric Administration (Ann Arbor, Rockville, Seattle)
- Occupational Safety and Health Administration
- Federal Emergency Management Agency
- Pennsylvania Department of Environmental Protection
- Pennsylvania Emergency Management Agency
- West Virginia Department of Natural Resources
- West Virginia Department of Health
- Ohio Environmental Protection Agency
- Ohio River Valley Water Sanitation Commission
- Kentucky Department for Environmental Protection

Multiple techniques were used to contain and remove oil from the river. Containment and deflection booms were used to contain oil that had not emulsified. Barges were also used to deflect and recover oil. Two self-propelled suction barges were also used to vacuum oil from the water and store in the vessel. In total 150 people, 11 vacuum trucks, 3 cranes, 10 barges/towboats, and 20,000 feet of boom were used throughout the cleanup process.

Cold temperatures and rocky and steep terrain hindered workers throughout the cleanup process. Cold temperatures not only caused mechanical issues, but also affected workers. Hypothermia increased and temperatures became unbearable enough that work had to be suspended several times during cleanup. Ice throughout the river made it difficult to maneuver large mechanical cleanup equipment and caused oil to emulsify faster and stabilize, increasing the potential for water contamination. Access to certain parts of the river were nearly impossible due to steep banks and rocky terrain.

== Legal aftermath ==
Ashland was fined $2.25 million by the Federal Government. It was at the time the largest fine levied on an oil company after a fuel spill. Ashland was charged with two misdemeanors: one for violating the Clean Water Act and another for violating the Federal Refuse Act. Ashland paid about $18 million in cleanup fees and civil lawsuits from those distressed by the experience.
