= Public Health Service Outstanding Unit Citation =

Decoration of the U.S. Public Health Service

- Type: Unit award
- Awarded for: Outstanding service, usually of national importance
- Country: United States
- Presented by: United States Public Health Service
- Eligibility: Members of the United States Public Health Service Commissioned Corps

Precedence
- Next (higher): Presidential Unit Citation
- Next (lower): Unit Commendation

The Public Health Service Outstanding Unit Citation is a decoration of the United States Public Health Service presented to members of the United States Public Health Service Commissioned Corps. It is the second-highest unit award of the USPHS Commissioned Corps.

== Criteria ==
The USPHS Commissioned Corps grants the Outstanding Unit Citation typically for specific actions over a relatively short and defined period of time, marked by discrete beginning and ending dates. Officers of a USPHS unit receive the Outstanding Unit Citation because of their collective contributions to the action or actions of the unit. Although all officers of the unit are eligible to receive the award, the appropriateness of inclusion of each officer is considered individually; however, a nomination for the citation does not need to cite the specific role of each officer.

The Outstanding Unit Citation is the second-highest unit award of the USPHS Commissioned Corps. The determinants of the appropriate level of recognition for a USPHS unit award are the importance and significance of the unit's action or actions in furthering the mission of the USPHS Commissioned Corps and the extent to which the achievement exceeds that which is normally expected of such officers. To merit the Outstanding Unit Citation, a group of Commissioned Corps officers must exhibit outstanding contributions toward achieving the goals and objectives of the USPHS, and their unit must have provided outstanding service, often of national significance to the United States.

The USPHS Commissioned Corps may recognize an officer who is a member of a unit that also includes civilians with the Outstanding Unit Citation. Civilian members of the unit are recognized through the USPHS's civilian awards system, but the civilian members are listed on the USPHS Commissioned Corps award nomination.

== See also ==
- Awards and decorations of the Public Health Service
- Awards and decorations of the United States government
