= David Axelrod (physician) =

American public health official (b. 1935, d. 1994)

Commissioner of Health of the State of New York
- In office 1979–1991
- Governor: Hugh L. Carey; Mario Cuomo
- Preceded by: Robert P. Whalen
- Succeeded by: Mark R. Chassin

Personal details
- Born: January 7, 1935 Great Barrington, Massachusetts
- Died: July 4, 1994 (aged 59) Cohoes, New York
- Education: Harvard University (Bachelor's degree with high honors in 1956 and Medical degree in 1960)
- Occupation: Medical administrator
- Profession: physician
- Scientific career
- Fields: Health policy
- Workplaces: National Institutes of Health; New York State Department of Health

David Axelrod (1935–1994) was a New York physician and bureaucrat.

== Career ==
After obtaining his medical degree from Harvard in 1960, he served a two-year residency in Rochester. He then worked for the National Institutes of Health in Bethesda, Maryland as a virus research scientist until joining the New York State Department of Health in 1968.

He was Health Commissioner for the State of New York in the 1980s and 1990s. He was appointed by Governor Hugh Carey and served under Governor Mario Cuomo as well. He is considered to be the nation's foremost public health official of the 1980s.

He worked on issues of regulating doctors and hospitals, the confidentiality of AIDS patients, anti-smoking legislation and universal health insurance.

In the 1980s, Axelrod collaborated with the President of the University at Albany, SUNY to establish the School of Public Health. The university named a fellowship after him.

He also suffered a tarnished reputation in his handling of Love Canal, and was not transparent or forthcoming in his communications with the 700 affected families.

== Death ==
His career ended after he suffered a stroke in February 1991; he died three years later.
