= Healthcare Cost and Utilization Project =

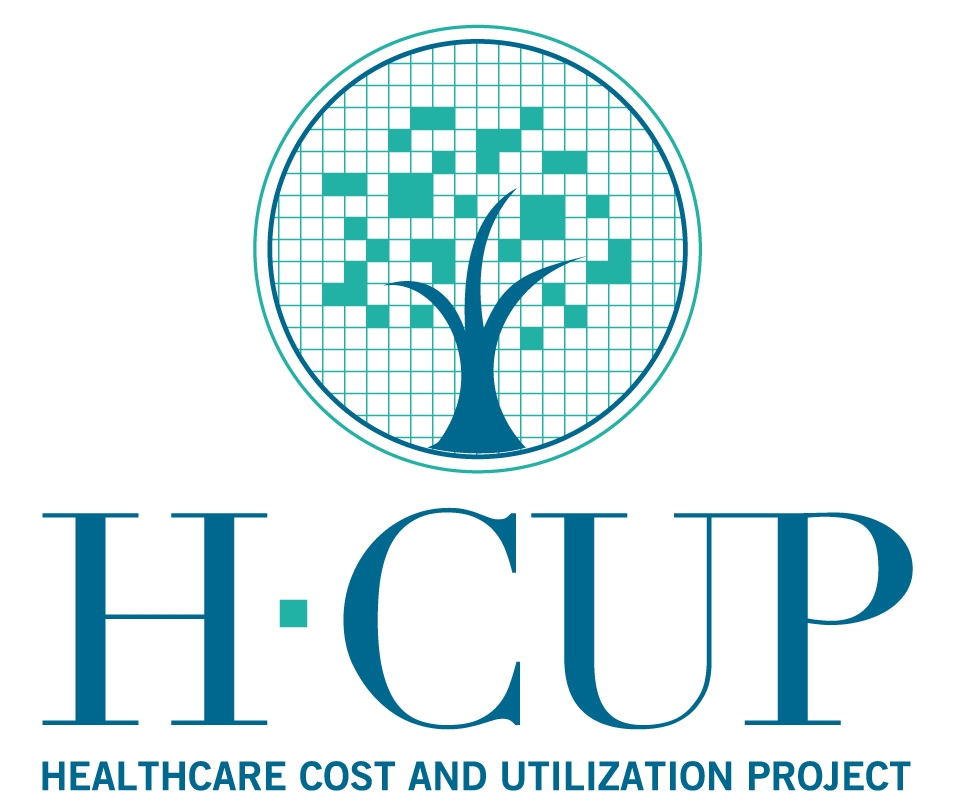
HCUP Logo

The Healthcare Cost and Utilization Project (HCUP, pronounced "H-Cup") is a family of healthcare databases and related software tools and products from the United States that is developed through a Federal-State-Industry partnership and sponsored by the Agency for Healthcare Research and Quality (AHRQ).

== General Information ==
HCUP provides access to healthcare databases for research and policy analysis, as well as tools and products to enhance the capabilities of the data. HCUP databases combine the data collection efforts of State data organizations, hospital associations, private data organizations, and the Federal Government to create a national information resource of patient-level healthcare data. State organizations that provide data to HCUP are called Partners. HCUP includes multiyear hospital administrative (inpatient, outpatient, and emergency department) data in the United States, with all-payer, encounter-level information beginning in 1988. These databases enable research on health and policy issues at the national, State, and local levels, including cost and quality of health services, medical practice patterns, access to healthcare, and outcomes of treatments. AHRQ has also developed a set of software tools to be used when evaluating hospital data. These software tools can be used with the HCUP databases and with other administrative databases. HCUP’s Supplemental Files are only for use with HCUP databases. HCUP databases have been used in various studies on a number of topics, such as breast cancer, depression, and multimorbidity, incidence and cost of injuries, role of socioeconomic status in patients leaving against medical advice, multiple chronic conditions and disparities in readmissions, and hospitalization costs for cystic fibrosis.

== HCUP User Support Website (HCUP-US) ==
The HCUP User Support website is the main repository of information for HCUP. It is designed to answer HCUP-related questions; provide detailed information on HCUP databases, tools, and products; and offer technical assistance to HCUP users. HCUP’s tools, publications, documentation, news, services, HCUP Fast Stats, and HCUPnet (the online data query system) may all be accessed through HCUP-US. HCUP-US is located at https://www.hcup-us.ahrq.gov.

== HCUP Overview Course ==
HCUP has developed an interactive online course that provides an overview of the features, capabilities, and potential uses of HCUP. The course is modular, so users can either move through the entire course or access the resources in which they are most interested. The On-line HCUP Overview Course (https://www.hcup-us.ahrq.gov/overviewcourse.jsp) can work both as an introduction to HCUP data and tools and a refresher for established users.

== HCUP Online Tutorial Series ==
The HCUP Online Tutorial Series (https://www.hcup-us.ahrq.gov/tech_assist/tutorials.jsp) is a set of interactive training courses that provide HCUP data users with information about HCUP data and tools, and training on technical methods for conducting research with HCUP data. The online courses are modular, so users can move through an entire course or access the sections in which they are most interested. Topics include loading and checking HCUP data, understanding HCUP’s sampling design, calculating standard errors, producing national estimates, conducting multiyear analysis, and using the Nationwide Readmissions Database (NRD).

== HCUP Databases ==
HCUP databases bring together data from State data organizations, hospital associations, private data organizations, and the Federal Government to create an information resource of patient-level healthcare data. HCUP’s databases (https://www.hcup-us.ahrq.gov/databases.jsp) date back to 1988 data files. The databases contain encounter-level information for all payers compiled in a uniform format with privacy protections in place. Researchers and policymakers can use the records to identify, track, and analyze national trends in healthcare use, access, charges, quality, and outcomes. HCUP databases are released approximately 6 to 18 months after the end of a given calendar year, with State databases available earlier than the national or nationwide datasets. Currently, there are eight types of HCUP databases: four with national- and regional-level data and three with State- and local-level data.

=== National Databases ===
- National Inpatient Sample (NIS) (formerly the Nationwide Inpatient Sample): A 20 percent stratified sample of all-payer, inpatient discharges from U.S. community hospitals (excluding rehabilitation and long-term acute-care hospitals). The NIS is available from 1988 forward, and a new database is released annually, approximately 18 months after the end of a calendar year.
- Kids’ Inpatient Database (KID): A nationwide sample of all-payer pediatric inpatient care discharges. Its large sample size is ideal for developing national and regional estimates and enables analyses of rare conditions, such as congenital anomalies, as well as uncommon treatments, such as organ transplantation. The KID was released every 3 years, from 1997 to 2012 and resumed release again in 2016.
- Nationwide Emergency Department Sample (NEDS): An all-payer emergency department (ED) database of approximately 30 million records that yields national estimates of 145 million ED visits. The NEDS captures encounters where the patient is admitted for inpatient treatment, as well as those in which the patient is treated and released. The NEDS is released annually and is available from 2006 forward.
- Nationwide Readmissions Database (NRD): The NRD is designed to support various types of analyses of national readmission rates for all patients, regardless of expected payer for the hospital stay. The NRD is released annually and is available from 2010 forward.
- Nationwide Ambulatory Surgery Sample (NASS): The NASS is the largest all-payer ambulatory surgery database that has been constructed in the United States, yielding national estimates of major ambulatory surgery encounters performed in hospital-owned facilities. The NASS is released annually and is available starting with the 2016 data year.

=== State Databases ===
- State Inpatient Databases (SID): The SID are databases from the universe of inpatient discharge abstracts from participating States, released annually. Data are available from 1995 forward. The SID are released on a rolling basis, as early as 6 months following the end of a calendar year.
- State Ambulatory Surgery and Services Databases (SASD): The SASD are ambulatory surgery and other outpatient service abstracts from hospital-owned and sometimes freestanding ambulatory surgery sites in participating States. Data are available from 1997 forward. The SASD are released on a rolling basis, as early as 6 months following the end of a calendar year.
- State Emergency Department Databases (SEDD): The SEDD are hospital-affiliated emergency department data for visits in participating States that do not result in hospitalizations. Data are available from 1999 forward. The SEDD are released on a rolling basis, as early as 6 months following the end of a calendar year.

== HCUP Tools and Software ==
HCUP provides a number of tools and software programs that can be applied to HCUP and other similar administrative databases.

=== Readily Available HCUP Statistics ===
==== HCUPnet ====
HCUPnet (https://hcupnet.ahrq.gov/) is an online query system that provides healthcare statistics and information from the HCUP national (NIS, NEDS, KID, and NRD) and State (SID, SASD, and SEDD) databases for those States that have agreed to participate. HCUPnet can be used for identifying, tracking, analyzing, and comparing statistics on hospital inpatient stays, emergency care, and ambulatory surgery, as well as obtaining measures of quality-based information from the AHRQ Quality Indicators. Select statistics are available at a national- and county-level. HCUPnet can also be used for trend analysis with healthcare data available from 1993 forward. HCUPnet also includes a feature called hospital readmissions that provides users with some statistics on hospital readmissions within 7 and 30 days of hospital discharge.

==== HCUP Fast Stats ====
HCUP Fast Stats (https://www.hcup-us.ahrq.gov/faststats/landing.jsp) is a web-based tool that provides easy access to the latest HCUP-based statistics for healthcare information topics. HCUP Fast Stats uses visual statistical displays in standalone graphs, trend figures, or simple tables to convey complex information at a glance. Fast Stats topics are updated regularly (quarterly or annually, as newer data become available) for timely, topic-specific national and State-level statistics.

The following topics are available:

- State Trends in Hospital Use by Payer (formerly called Effect of Health Insurance Expansion on Hospital Use and Effect of Medicaid Expansion on Hospital Use). This topic includes statistics from up to 44 States on the number of hospital discharges by payer group.
- National Hospital Utilization and Costs. This topic focuses on national statistics on inpatient stays: Trends, Most Common Diagnoses, and Most Common Operations.
- State Trends in Emergency Department Visits by Payer. These ED statistics are a supplement to the existing State-level inpatient stay trends by expected payer.
- Opioid-Related Hospital Use, National and State. This topic reports population-based rates of opioid-related hospital use by discharge quarter. Trends are available for inpatient stays and emergency department visits by expected payer.
- Neonatal Abstinence Syndrome (NAS), National and State. This new topic provides trends in NAS-related newborn hospitalizations at the national and State level. Rates of NAS per 1,000 newborn hospitalizations are presented overall as well as by sex, expected payer, community-level income, and patient location.
- Hurricane Impact on Hospital Use. This new topic provides historical inpatient and treat-and-release emergency department utilization information from 11 U.S. hurricanes between 2005 and 2017. Supported by the Patient-Centered Outcomes Research Trust Fund (PCORTF) and created in collaboration with the Office of the Assistant Secretary for Planning and Evaluation (ASPE) and the Office of the Assistant Secretary for Preparedness and Response (ASPR), this topic is designed to help HCUP users understand medical care utilization during and after past hurricanes to assist in the preparation for and deployment of medical services in future disasters.

=== HCUP Software ===
The HCUP software can be applied to HCUP databases, to systematically create new data elements from existing data, thereby enhancing a researcher's ability to conduct analyses. While designed to be used with HCUP databases, the analytic tools may be applied to other administrative databases.

==== Clinical Classifications Software (CCS) ====
The Clinical Classifications Software (CCS) provides a method for classifying diagnoses or procedures into clinically meaningful categories. These can be used for aggregate statistical reporting of a variety of topics, such as identifying populations for disease- or procedure-specific studies or developing statistical reports providing information (i.e., charges and length of stay) about relatively specific conditions. Four versions of the CCS Software are available:

- The Clinical Classifications Software Refined (CCSR) for ICD-10-CM aggregates more than 70,000 ICD-10-CM diagnosis codes into a manageable number of clinically meaningful categories. The categories are organized across 21 body systems, which generally follow the structure of the ICD-10-CM diagnosis chapters.
- The Clinical Classification Software (CCS) for ICD-10-PCS procedures (beta version) categorizes more than 77,000 ICD-10-PCS procedure codes into clinically meaningful categories and can be used to identify populations for procedure-specific studies or to develop statistical reports about relatively specific procedures.
- Clinical Classifications Software (CCS) for ICD-9-CM is based on the International Classification of Diseases, 9th Revision, Clinical Modification (ICD-9-CM), a uniform and standardized coding system. The CCS for ICD-9-CM provides a diagnosis and procedure categorization scheme that can be used to classify more than 14,000 ICD-9-CM diagnosis and 3,900 procedure codes into a manageable number of clinically meaningful categories. The CCS for ICD-9-CM was updated annually starting January 1980 through September 30, 2015. ICD-9-CM codes were frozen in preparation for ICD-10-CM implementation and regular maintenance of the codes has been suspended.
- Clinical Classifications Software (CCS) for Services and Procedures provides users with a method of classifying Current Procedural Terminology (CPT®) codes and Healthcare Common Procedure Coding System (HCPCS) codes into 244 clinically meaningful procedure categories. More than 9,000 CPT/HCPCS codes and 6,000 HCPCs codes are accounted for.

The CCS versions and their user guides are available for download from the HCUP-US website: https://www.hcup-us.ahrq.gov/tools_software.jsp.

==== Chronic Condition Indicator ====
The Chronic Condition Indicator (CCI) facilitates health services research on diagnoses using administrative data. The CCI tools categorize ICD-9-CM/ICD-10-CM diagnoses codes into two classifications: chronic or not chronic. A chronic condition is defined as a condition that lasts 12 months or longer and meets one or both of the following tests: (a) it places limitations on self-care, independent living, and social interactions; and (b) it results in the need for ongoing intervention with medical products, services, and special equipment.

Two versions of the CCI software are available, CCI for ICD-9-CM and CCI for ICD-10-CM (beta version). The ICD-9-CM CCI was updated annually and is valid for codes from January 1, 1980, through September 20, 2015. The ICD-10-CM CCI is updated annually and is valid for codes from October 1, 2015, forward. The CCI Software is available for download on the HCUP-US website: https://www.hcup-us.ahrq.gov/tools_software.jsp.

==== Elixhauser Comorbidity Software ====
Elixhauser Comorbidity Software assigns variables that identify comorbidities in hospital discharge records using ICD-9-CM or ICD-10-CM diagnosis coding. Two versions of the Elixhauser Comorbidity Software are available: Elixhauser Comorbidity Software for ICD-10-CM (beta version) and Elixhauser Comorbidity Software for ICD-9-CM. The Elixhauser Software for ICD-9-CM was updated annually from January 1, 1980, through September 30, 2015. The Elixhauser Comorbidity Software for ICD-10-CM (beta version) is updated annually and based on the ICD-10-CM and MS-DRG codes that are valid through September 30 of the designated fiscal year after October 1, 2015. The Elixhauser Comorbidity Software is available for download on the HCUP-US website: https://www.hcup-us.ahrq.gov/tools_software.jsp.

==== Procedure Classes ====
Procedure Classes facilitate research on hospital services using administrative data by identifying whether an ICD-9-CM or ICD-10-CM procedure is (a) diagnostic or therapeutic, and (b) minor or major in terms of invasiveness and/or resource use. There are two versions of Procedure Classes tools, Procedure Classes for ICD-9-CM and Procedure Classes for ICD-10-PCS (beta version). The Procedure Classes can be used to categorize procedure codes into one of four broad categories: minor diagnostic, minor therapeutic, major diagnostic, and major therapeutic.

The Procedure Classes for ICD-9-CM were updated annually from January 1, 1980, through September 30, 2015. The Procedure Classes for ICD-10-PCS (beta version) are updated annually and valid for codes from October 1, 2015, forward. Procedure Classes are available for download from the HCUP-US website: https://www.hcup-us.ahrq.gov/tools_software.jsp.

==== Utilization Flags ====
Utilization Flags combine information from Uniform Billing (UB-04) revenue codes and ICD-9-CM or ICD-10-PCS procedure codes to create flags—or indicators—of utilization of services rendered in healthcare settings such as hospitals, emergency departments, and ambulatory surgery centers. The Utilization Flags can be used to study a broad range of services, including simple diagnostic tests and resource-intense procedures, such as use of intensive care units. They can also be used to more reliably examine utilization of diagnostic and therapeutic services. There are two types of Utilization Flags, Utilization Flags for ICD-9-CM and Utilization Flags for ICD-10-CM/PCS (beta version). The Utilization Flags for ICD-9-CM were updated annually from January 1, 2003, through September 30, 2015. The Utilization Flags for ICD-10-CM/PCS (beta version) are updated annually and valid for codes from October 1, 2015, forward. The Utilization Flags are available for download from the HCUP-US website: https://www.hcup-us.ahrq.gov/tools_software.jsp.

==== Surgery Flags ====
Surgery Flag Software classifies procedures and encounters in ICD-9-CM or CPT-based inpatient and ambulatory surgery into two types of surgical categories: NARROW and BROAD. NARROW surgery is based on a narrow, targeted, and restrictive definition and includes invasive surgical procedures. An invasive therapeutic surgical procedure involves incision, excision, manipulation, or suturing of tissue that penetrates or breaks the skin; typically requires use of an operating room; and requires regional anesthesia, general anesthesia, or sedation to control pain. BROAD surgery includes procedures that fall under the NARROW category but adds less invasive therapeutic surgeries and diagnostic procedures often performed in surgical settings. Users must agree to a license agreement with the American Medical Association to use the Surgery Flags before accessing the software. The Surgery Flags are available for download from the HCUP-US website: https://www.hcup-us.ahrq.gov/tools_software.jsp.

==== AHRQ Quality Indicators (QIs) ====
The AHRQ Quality Indicators (QIs) (https://www.qualityindicators.ahrq.gov/) are standardized, evidence-based measures of healthcare quality that can be used with readily available hospital inpatient administrative data to measure and track clinical performance and outcomes. The AHRQ QIs consist of four modules measuring various aspects of quality:

- Prevention Quality Indicators (PQIs) identify issues of access to outpatient care, including appropriate followup care after hospital discharge. More specifically, the PQIs use data from hospital discharges to identify admissions that might have been avoided through access to high-quality outpatient care. The PQIs are population based and adjusted for covariates.
- Inpatient Quality Indicators (IQIs) provide a perspective on quality of care inside hospitals, including:
  - Inpatient mortality for surgical procedures and medical conditions;
  - Utilization of procedures for which there are questions of overuse, underuse, and misuse; and
  - Volume of procedures for which hospital procedure volume is an important indicator of performance.
- Patient Safety Indicators (PSIs) provide information on potentially avoidable safety events that represent opportunities for improvement in the delivery of care. More specifically, they focus on potential in-hospital complications and adverse events following surgeries, procedures, and childbirth.
- Pediatric Quality Indicators (PDIs) focus on potentially preventable complications and iatrogenic events for pediatric patients treated in hospitals and on preventable hospitalizations among pediatric patients, taking into account the special characteristics of the pediatric population.

=== HCUP Supplemental Files ===
The HCUP Supplemental Files augment applicable HCUP databases with additional data elements or analytically useful information that is not available when the HCUP databases are originally released. They cannot be used with other administrative databases. The HCUP Supplemental Files are available for download from the HCUP-US website: https://www.hcup-us.ahrq.gov/tools_software.jsp.

==== Cost-to-Charge Ratio Files (CCR) ====
The Cost-to-Charge Ratio (CCR) Files (https://www.hcup-us.ahrq.gov/db/state/costtocharge.jsp) are hospital-level files designed to convert the hospital total charge data to total cost estimates for services when merged with data elements exclusively in the HCUP NIS, KID, NRD, and SID. HCUP databases are limited to information on total hospital charges, which reflect the amount billed to the payer per patient encounter. Total charges do not reflect the actual cost of providing care or the payment received by the hospital for services provided. This total charge data can be converted into cost estimates using the CCR Files, which include hospital-wide values of the all-payer inpatient cost-to-charge ratio for nearly every hospital in the participating NIS, KID, NRD, and SID. The CCR Files are updated annually and available for the HCUP inpatient databases beginning with 2001 data. CCR Files for use with the HCUP emergency department databases (NEDS and SEDD) are under development.

==== Hospital Market Structure (HMS) Files ====
The Hospital Market Structure (HMS) Files (https://www.hcup-us.ahrq.gov/toolssoftware/hms/hms.jsp) are hospital-level files designed to supplement the data elements in the NIS, KID, and SID databases. The HMS Files contain various measures of hospital market competition. Hospital market definitions were based on hospital locations, and in some cases, patient ZIP Codes. Hospital locations were obtained from the American Hospital Association (AHA) Annual Survey Database, Area Resource File (ARF), HCUP Historical Urban/Rural – County (HURC) file, and ArcView GIS. Patient ZIP Codes were obtained from the SID.

HMS Files are useful for performing empirical analyses that examine the effects of hospital competition on the cost, access, and quality of hospital services. The HCUP HMS Files are available for the 1997, 2000, 2003, 2006, and 2009 data years.

==== HCUP Supplemental Variables for Revisit Analyses ====
The HCUP Supplemental Variables for Revisit Analyses (https://www.hcup-us.ahrq.gov/toolssoftware/revisit/revisit.jsp) allow users to track sequential visits for a patient within a State and across facilities and hospital settings (inpatient, emergency department, and ambulatory surgery) while adhering to strict privacy guidelines. Users can use the available clinical information to determine if sequential visits are unrelated, an expected followup, complications from a previous treatment, or an unexpected revisit or rehospitalization. The supplemental files must be merged with the corresponding SID, SASD, or SEDD for any analysis. Beginning with 2009 data, the revisit variables are included in the Core file of the HCUP State Databases when possible.

==== NIS and KID Trend Files ====
The NIS-Trends (https://www.hcup-us.ahrq.gov/db/nation/nis/nistrends.jsp) and KID-Trends (https://www.hcup-us.ahrq.gov/db/nation/kid/kidtrends.jsp) files are available to help researchers conduct longitudinal analyses. They are discharge-level files that provide researchers with the trend weights and, in the case of the NIS-Trends, data elements that are consistently defined across data years.

==== American Hospital Association (AHA) Linkage Files ====
The American Hospital Association (AHA) Linkage Files (https://www.hcup-us.ahrq.gov/db/state/ahalinkage/aha_linkage.jsp) are hospital-level files that contain a small number of data elements that allow researchers to supplement the HCUP State Databases with information from the AHA Annual Survey Databases (https://www.ahadata.com/aha-annual-survey-database). The files are designed to support richer empirical analysis where hospital characteristics may be important factors. Linkage is only possible in States that allow the release of hospital identifiers and are unique by State and year.

== HCUP News and Reports ==
HCUP produces material to report new findings based on HCUP data and to announce HCUP news.

- The HCUP eNews summarizes activities of the HCUP project quarterly.
- The HCUP Mailing List sends email updates on news, product releases, events, and the quarterly eNews to interested subscribers.
- HCUP Statistical Briefs provide healthcare statistics for various topics based on HCUP databases.
- HCUP Infographics present visual representations of data from the HCUP Statistical Brief series. Topics have included inpatient vs. outpatient surgeries in U.S. hospitals, neonatal hospital stays related to substance use, and characteristics of hospital stays involving malnutrition.
- HCUP Methods Series Reports offer methodological information on the HCUP databases and software tools.
- HCUP Findings-At-A-Glance provide snapshots covering a broad range of health policy issues related to hospital use and costs.

== See also ==
- Agency for Healthcare Research and Quality
- All-payer claims database
- United States Department of Health and Human Services
- MONAHRQ
- International Statistical Classification of Diseases and Related Health Problems
- Medicine
- Patient safety
- Emergency Department
- Hospital
- Inpatient care
