= All-payer claims database =

Database aggregating health insurance claims data

An all-payer claims database (APCD) is a large-scale health database, generally administered at the US state level, that aggregates medical billing, pharmacy, and dental claims, enrollment files, and eligibility information from multiple payers, including commercial insurers, Medicare, Medicaid, and in uncommon instances self-funded ERISA employer health plans, to create a comprehensive resource on health care utilization, costs, and coverage patterns across populations. As of 2025, at least half the states had active APCDs with varying degrees of public access, governance models, and analytic tools.

Unlike hospital discharge databases such as the Healthcare Cost and Utilization Project (HCUP), which compile encounter-level administrative data from hospitals, APCDs collect longitudinal, patient-centered claims submitted by insurers and third-party administrators, covering services across the continuum of care (inpatient, outpatient, physician, ancillary, and pharmacy). APCDs are used by state governments, researchers, and policymakers for cost transparency, payment reform, population health analytics, and evaluation of delivery system changes.

Implementation is state-specific, with enabling legislation, regulatory authority, and technical specifications determining reporting requirements and scope. The US Supreme Court decision in Gobeille v. Liberty Mutual Insurance Co. (2016) limited mandatory inclusion of self-funded ERISA plans, leading to federal efforts.

== See also ==
- Healthcare Cost and Utilization Project
- Health informatics
