= Healthcare in New York (state) =

Healthcare in New York refers to all health care available in the state of New York. The healthcare system does not provide for the entire population, but instead most people are covered by a combination of private insurance and various federal and state programs. The state relies on a county-based system for delivery of public health services, though the state government handles many things in areas such as professional and facility licensing. Services can broadly be categorized into inpatient care, outpatient care, and long-term care. The health care and social assistance sector accounted for 18.2% of total non-farm employment in the state.

== Insurance ==
The US health system does not provide health care to the country's entire population. Instead, most citizens are covered by a combination of private insurance and various federal and state programs. Health insurance was most commonly acquired through a group plan tied to an employer. In New York, public payers (Medicare + Medicaid + other government programs) account for a majority of all health care funding. 72% of hospital inpatient admissions, 62% of hospital outpatient care, and 53 % of hospital patient service revenue was covered by Medicare or Medicaid, while 44% of the state population and 60% of New York City were enrolled in Medicaid or the Essential Plan.

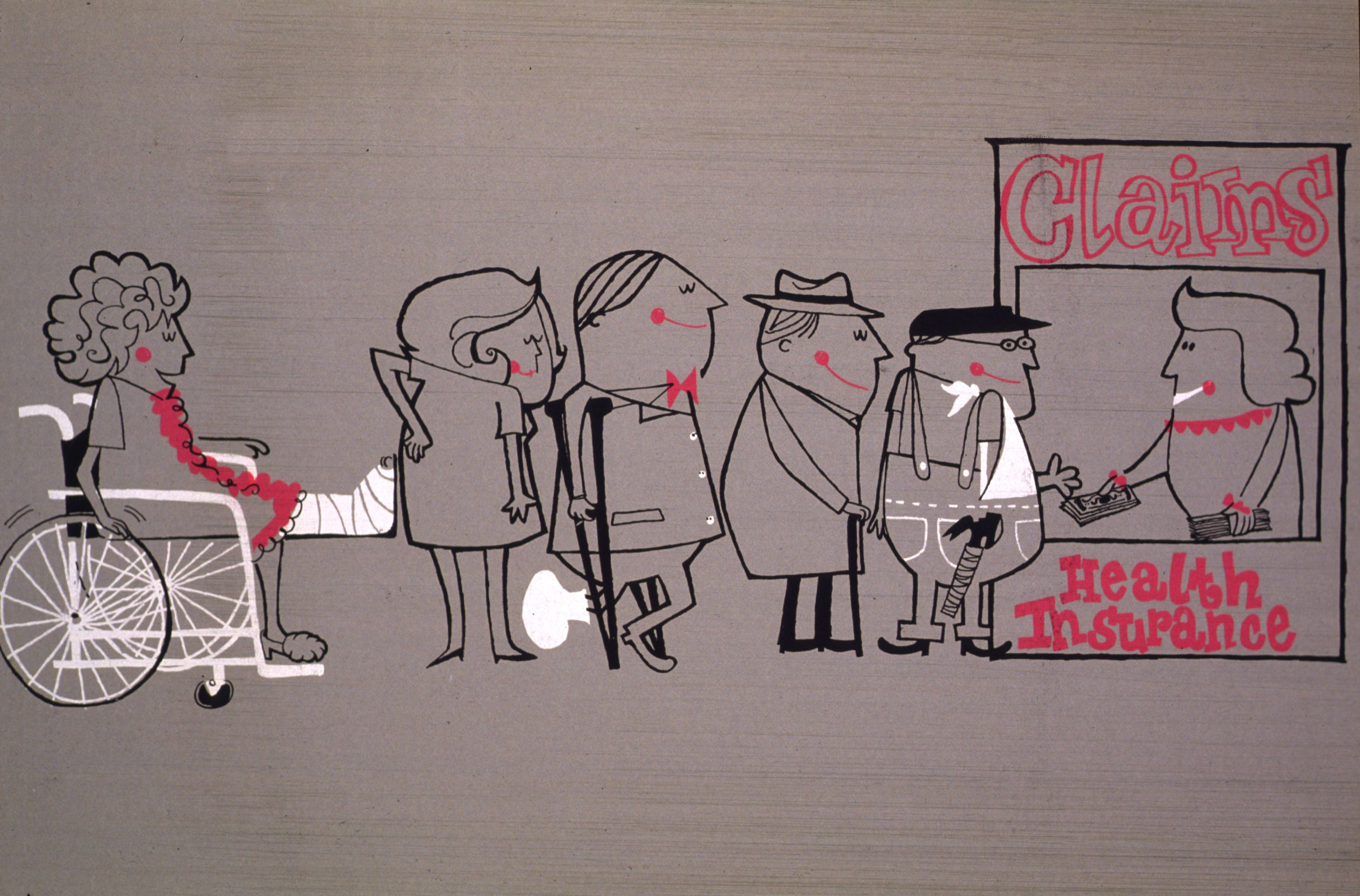
Public payers (Medicare + Medicaid + other government programs) account for a majority of funding

Essential health benefits (EHBs) are required for non-grandfathered individual and small group plans, meant to reflect benefits typically included in large employer-sponsored plans, but are not state-mandated for fully-insured large employer plans and do not apply to self-insured ERISA (often large employer) plans. Since a majority of New Yorkers are enrolled in self-insured ERISA plans, EHBs cover a small minority of New Yorkers. There are no minimum coverage standards for dental plans, and routine adult dental services are not considered EHBs. New York has enacted additional mandates that exceed federal EHB requirements, for example Timothy's Law requires that all fully-insured plans provide comparable coverage for mental health services as they do for physical health services to ensure mental health parity, including for substance use disorders. Self-insured ERISA plans are exempt from state insurance mandates due to federal preemption but are subject to federal requirements like the Mental Health Parity and Addiction Equity Act.

Health insurance claim appeals are governed by the Affordable Care Act's federal claims and appeals and external review requirements in all cases, with fully insured plans implementing those rights through New York's state-run grievance and external appeal system, while self-funded ERISA plans implement the same federal standards through ERISA-based internal appeals and a federal external review process not administered by the state. The vast majority of external appeals are over the medical necessity of treatment.

NY State of Health is the health insurance marketplace that manages eligibility and enrollment for Medicaid applicants and selects the benchmark plan for EHBs. New York has transitioned to Medicaid managed care (MMC) for primary and acute care, away from the fee-for-service model, and most beneficiaries enroll in "mainstream" Medicaid managed care plans, through which most Medicaid beneficiaries receive their medical, dental, and pharmacy benefits. Managed long-term care (MLTC) plans cover long-term services and supports, with "partial capitation" plans covering only certain Medicaid services being the most familiar and having the most enrollment, and "full capitation" Medicaid Advantage Plus (MAP) and Program of All-Inclusive Care for the Elderly (PACE) plans combining all Medicare and Medicaid services. The Medicaid behavioral health system has also transitioned to MMC.

The Essential Plan offers essential health benefits for non-Medicaid-eligible residents with up to 250% of federal poverty level incomes with minimal or $0 monthly premiums and nominal or $0 copays. It is the state implementation of the Affordable Care Act Basic Health Program. Its benefits include (but are not limited to) dental, vision, inpatient and outpatient hospital care, prescription drugs, and free preventive care like routine exams and screenings.

== Infrastructure ==
The Centers for Disease Control and Prevention describes the public health infrastructure as three components: workforce capacity and competency: the recruitment, continuing education, and retention of health professionals; organizational capacity: the consortium of public health agencies and laboratories, working with private and nonprofit organizations; and information and data systems: the up-to-date guidelines, recommendations and health alerts, and the information and systems that monitor disease and enable efficient communication.

Map of Nurse Licensure Compact states. US nurses are not allowed to practice in New York without more. The largest nurses union argues that American nurses would lower standards. Compact member

New York State relies on a county-based system for delivery of public health services. The state Department of Health promotes the prevention and control of disease, environmental health, healthy lifestyles, and emergency preparedness and response; supervises local health boards; oversees reporting and vital records; conducts surveillance of hospitals; does research at the Wadsworth Center; and administers several other health insurance programs and institutions. 58 local health departments offer core services including assessing community health, disease control and prevention, family health, and health education; 37 localities provide environmental health services, while the other 21 rely on the state Department of Health.

At the local level, public health workers are found not only in local health agencies but also in private and nonprofit organizations concerned with the public's health. The most common professional disciplines are physicians, nurses, environmental specialists, laboratorians, health educators, disease investigators, outreach workers, and managers, as well as other allied health professions. Nurses represented 22% of the localities' workforce (and 42% of full-time equivalent workers in rural localities), scientific/investigative staff represented 22%–27% of the workforce, support staff represented 28%, education/outreach staff represented 10%, and physicians represented 1%.

== Pricing and payment ==
Providers are paid through a combination of administratively defined public payment systems and privately negotiated commercial rates, supported by internal fee-for-service accounting. Payment mechanisms vary by payer and provider type, and are largely independent of providers' internal list prices. Most institutional providers maintain chargemasters—comprehensive internal lists of billable services, procedures, and supplies with associated nominal prices—that support billing operations, accounting, regulatory reporting, and contract negotiations, but function primarily as internal reference tools rather than actual payment amounts.

Commercial insurance payments are determined through contracts negotiated between insurers and provider organizations. Inpatient hospital services are most commonly reimbursed using DRG-based case rates, but per diem rates and percentage-of-charges arrangements are also used, sometimes concurrently within the same insurer or hospital contract. Outpatient services use a mix of case rates, percentage-of-charges, and fee schedules that vary by service category. As a result, payment levels differ across insurers, providers, and regions.

Medicare and New York Medicaid reimburse providers through administratively defined methodologies. Acute hospital inpatient services are paid using DRG-based case payments, under the IPPS for Medicare and the 3M All Patient Refined DRG (APR-DRG) for Medicaid. For outpatient hospital services, Medicare uses the OPPS while Medicaid generally uses ambulatory patient groups (APGs). Physician and other professional services are generally reimbursed under fee schedules.

== Financing ==
To help offset financial losses from serving Medicaid and uninsured patients, disproportionate share hospital (DSH) payments are distributed through multiple mechanisms. These include the Health Care Reform Act (HCRA)-funded Indigent Care Pool and adjustments for hospitals, DSH intergovernmental transfers for public hospitals, and DSH payments to Institutes for Mental Disease (IMDs). The Indigent Care Pool (ICP) is intended to help cover hospitals' costs from providing charity care and from unpaid bills classified as bad debt, in addition to their Medicaid shortfalls. Hospitals receive ICP reimbursements for debt even as they collect the same debt from patients, since nothing in the law requires them to credit patient accounts. As of 2018, hospitals received about $1.1 billion per year in ICP funds.

State directed payments (SDPs) allow states to require Medicaid managed care plans to pay providers at specific rates or using defined methods — such as uniform payment increases, minimum fee schedules, or value-based payment models — in addition to the base payment rates negotiated between plans and providers. New York's Directed Payment Template programs (DPTs) include value-based payment initiatives such as population-based payments for patient-centered medical home providers. They also include enhanced reimbursements for safety net, critical access, and sole community facilities, as well as for NYC Health + Hospitals' outpatient services. These payments are delivered through higher capitation rates paid to managed care plans, with the nonfederal share financed by state general funds, HCRA provider taxes, and intergovernmental transfers.

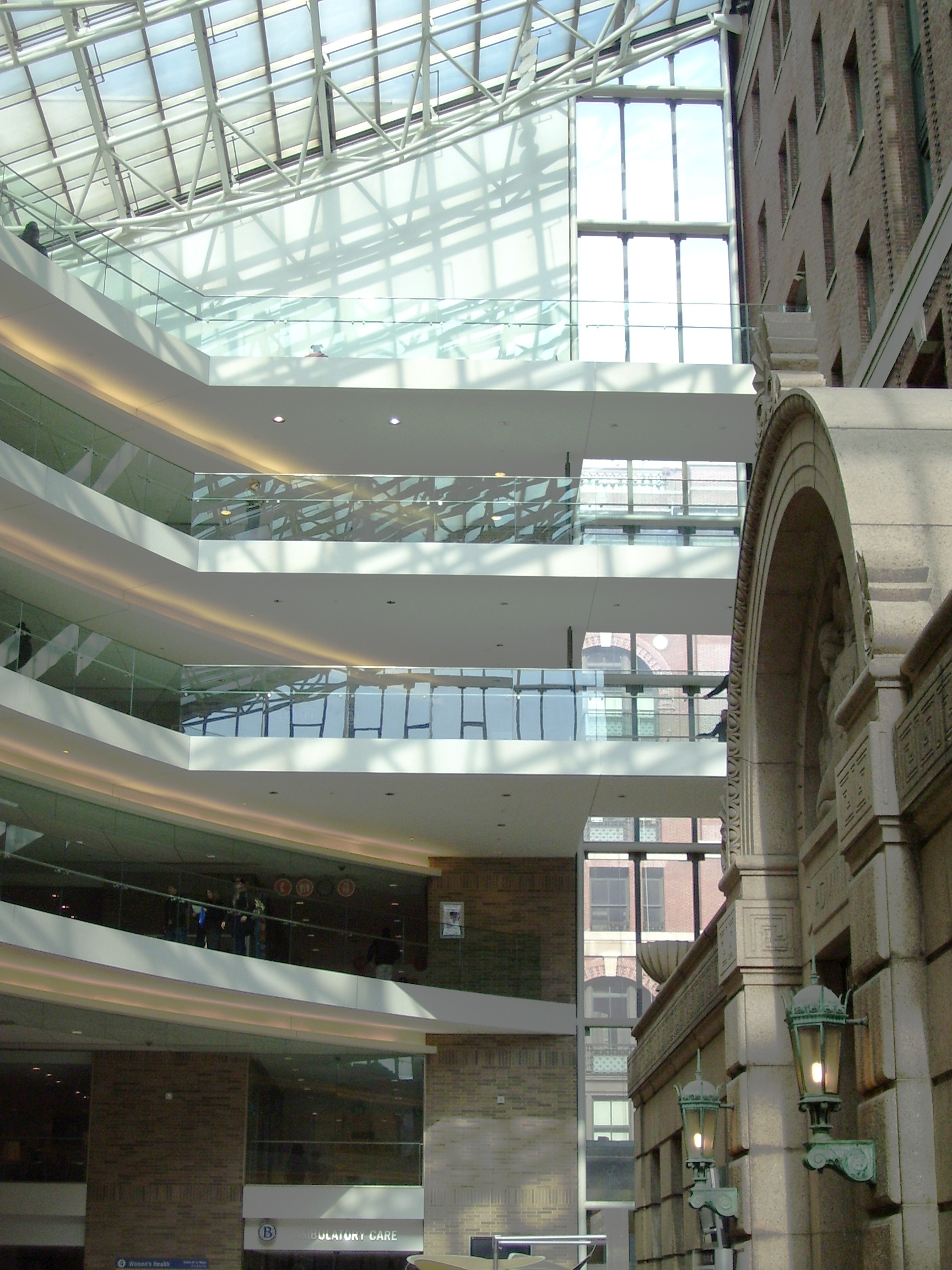
The Bellevue Hospital atrium. NYC Health + Hospitals is the largest safety-net hospital system in the US.

== Inpatient care ==
A general hospital is a standard acute care hospital with inpatient beds and 24/7 physician coverage. An inpatient rehabilitation facility (IRF) is devoted to the rehabilitation of patients following stabilization of their acute medical issues.

In the continuum of substance use disorder treatment programs, ASAM-aligned levels of care includes inpatient services (ASAM levels 3.7–4).

New York operates a dual system of inpatient psychiatric care. State psychiatric centers are publicly operated hospitals run by the Office of Mental Health (OMH) and primarily serve individuals with serious mental illness who require extended inpatient treatment, forensic patients involved with the criminal justice system, or individuals civilly committed. Private psychiatric hospitals provide inpatient psychiatric care, but their role has declined over time as psychiatric care shifted toward community-based and general-hospital settings. General hospitals may operate a psychiatric inpatient unit, and while the physical plant and hospital operations are licensed as Article 28 hospitals, the psychiatric services themselves are separately licensed and regulated by OMH.

An intermediate care facility for individuals with intellectual disabilities (ICF/IID) is a Medicaid-funded institution for people with intellectual disabilities and developmental disabilities regulated by the state Office for People With Developmental Disabilities (OPWDD). They are institutional and require active treatment services.

The American Hospital Directory lists 261 active hospitals in New York State in 2022. Two hundred and ten of these hospitals have staffed-beds with a total of 64,515 beds. The largest number of hospitals are in New York City. The January 1, 2022 listing by the state Department of Health of general hospitals covered by the New York Health Care Reform Act show 165 hospitals 63 closed hospitals, and 51 hospitals that had been merged with other hospitals. The oldest hospital in New York State and also oldest hospital in the United States is the Bellevue Hospital in Manhattan, established in 1736. The hospital with the largest number of staffed beds is the NewYork-Presbyterian Hospital in Manhattan with 2,678 beds in its hospital complex. Northwell Health is the state's largest healthcare provider and private employer.

== Outpatient care ==
A hospital-based outpatient department (HOPD) is an outpatient site operated under a hospital's Article 28 operating certificate. Diagnostic and treatment centers (D&TCs) are freestanding Article 28 facilities, hospital-affiliated or independent, providing outpatient services but having no inpatient beds. An extension clinic is an off-site component of a general hospital or diagnostic and treatment center outpatient program. HOPDs and freestanding D&TCs are both reimbursed by Medicaid under ambulatory patient groups (APGs), but HOPDs are treated as part of the hospital for cost reporting and supplemental payments and therefore have higher effective facility costs and reimbursement, while under Medicare, HOPDs are paid under OPPS and D&TC services are generally paid under the physician fee schedule.

In the continuum of substance use disorder treatment programs, ASAM-aligned levels of care includes outpatient services (ASAM levels 1–2.5). An outpatient program provides the baseline outpatient services, e.g. counseling and case management. Outpatient rehabilitation services are designed to assist with more chronic conditions and are typically scheduled three to five days per week for at least two hours per day. Opioid treatment programs are specialized outpatient services that administer and monitor addiction medications like methadone or buprenorphine under strict medical protocols.

As more psychiatric emergencies are being pushed into emergency departments, many patients are "boarded" (held after a decision to admit/transfer) for hours to days. Comprehensive psychiatric emergency programs (CPEPs) are meant to provide a single entry point for psychiatric emergencies, including crisis intervention in an emergency room setting, mobile crisis outreach, crisis residence beds, extended observation beds (up to 72 hours), and triage/referral.

The state Office of Mental Health (OMH) licenses a wide range of outpatient and rehabilitative programs designed to support individuals with serious mental illness in the community. Assertive Community Treatment (ACT) teams provide intensive, multidisciplinary, 24/7 community-based services for individuals with severe mental illness who have difficulty engaging in traditional outpatient care. Additional programs include partial hospitalization, continuing day treatment, and intensive outpatient services.

== Long-term care ==
=== Residential ===
A residential health care facility (RHCF) is a nursing home, i.e. facilities providing medical, residential care to adults who are substantially unable to live independently, with clinical-level staffing and oversight. RHCFs are mostly funded through Medicaid.

An adult care facility (ACF) is a facility providing non-medical, residential care to adults who are substantially unable to live independently. ACFs are legally prohibited from retaining residents who need ongoing medical or nursing care. ACFs are mostly funded through Supplemental Security Income (SSI) and state supplementary payments (SSP). They are regulated under Article 7 of the Social Services Law and Title 18 (Social Services) of the NYCRR.

An adult home is a type of ACF that provides non-medical, residential care—including room, board, personal care, and supervision—to five or more adults who are not related to the operator. Adult homes are regulated by the Department of Health. A transitional adult home, sometimes referred to as an impacted adult home, is an adult home with a capacity of at least 80 beds where at least 25% of residents have a serious mental illness (SMI). An assisted living residence (ALR) is a licensure category created in 2004 to standardize the use of the term "assisted living" and establish consumer protections. An assisted living program (ALP), established earlier under Medicaid waivers, enable ACF residents to receive Medicaid-funded home care services. Facilities with at least 55% ALP beds are excluded from Justice Center oversight, much like nursing homes, but are otherwise little different from regular adult homes. Many facilities operate both ALRs and ALPs concurrently.

A family type home is a type of ACF that provides non-medical, residential care to four or fewer adults. Family-type homes are regulated by the state Office of Children and Family Services.

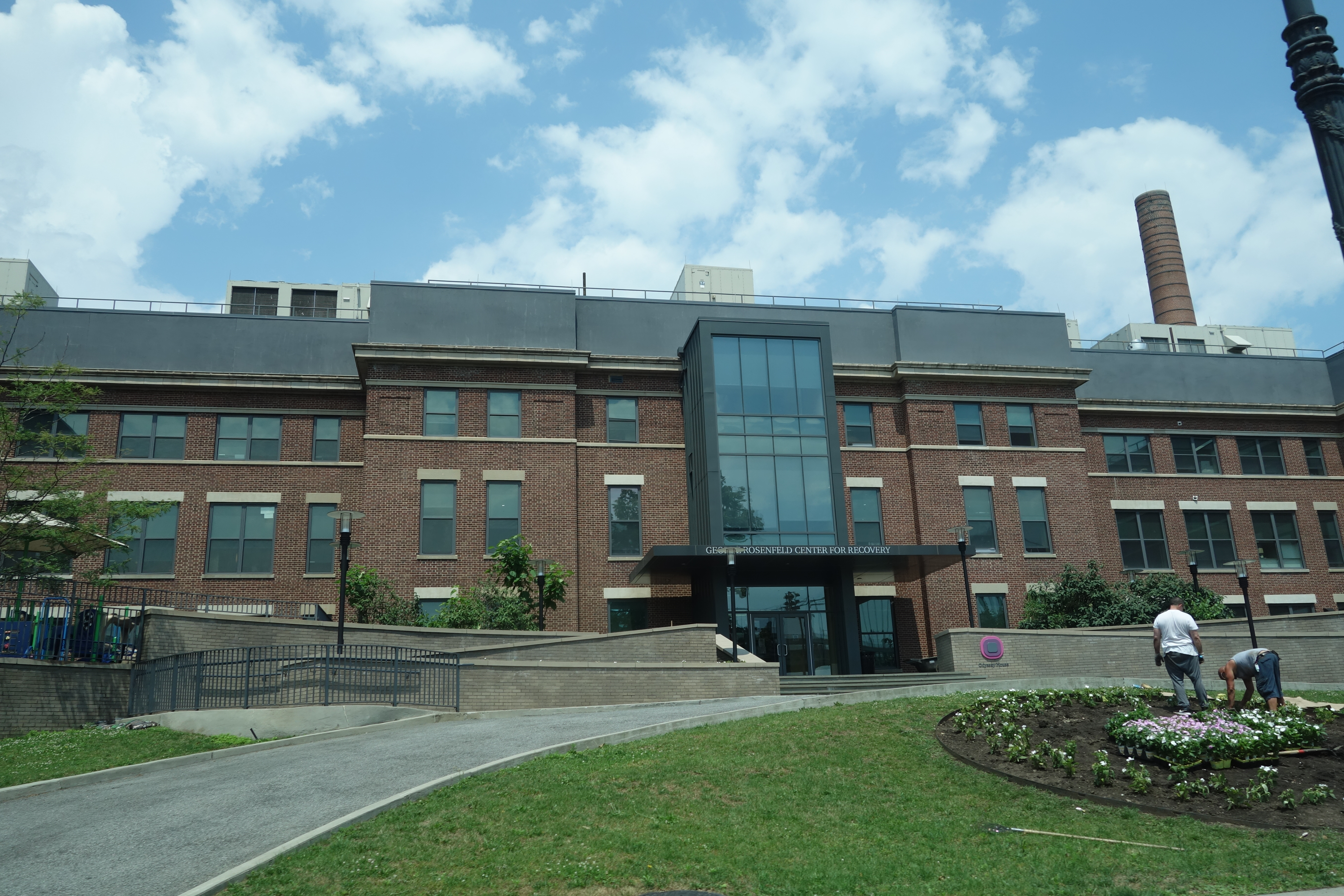
A rehab in Manhattan

In the continuum of substance use disorder treatment programs, ASAM-aligned levels of care includes residential services (ASAM levels 3.1–3.5). Residential services are 24/7 services in a residential setting. Stabilization services are structured, medically supported, short-term residential services to achieve medical/psychosocial stabilization. Rehabilitation services are structured, longer-term residential services for individuals with functional impairments needing habilitative supports. Reintegration services are focused on supporting return to community living, often in less structured environments.

The state Office for People With Developmental Disabilities (OPWDD) oversees a network of certified residential programs under Medicaid home and community-based services waivers (HCBS waivers) for individuals with developmental disabilities who require long-term housing with supervision and habilitative supports. A community residence (CR) provides housing, supplies and services, supportive interpersonal relationships, supervision, and training assistance; supervised CRs with staffing available around the clock, and supportive CRs for more independent routines and variable support. An individualized residential alternative (IRA) is a type of CR with more emphasis on independent living; supervised IRAs with staffing available around the clock, and supportive IRAs with staff support delivered as needed. A family care home is a private home with trained caregivers.

=== Non-residential ===
A certified home health agency (CHHA) provides medical, non-residential (community-based) home health care services that provide skilled nursing, therapy, and other services and is Medicare-certified. CHHAs are mostly funded through Medicare with Medicaid as a secondary payer.

A licensed home care services agency (LHCSA) provides non-medical, non-residential (community-based) home care services that provide personal care, home health aide, and other supportive services in a patient's residence. The Nursing Home Transition and Diversion waiver program is an Medicaid HCBS waiver program for non-residential (community-based) alternatives to nursing home care. The Consumer Directed Personal Assistance Program (CDPAP) also covers personal care services, providing non-medical assistance with activities of daily living (ADLs) and allowing recipients to direct unlicensed caregivers such as relatives. LHCSAs and CDPAP are mostly funded through Medicaid.

An adult day health care (ADHC) is an adult daycare center providing medical, non-residential (community-based) care to functionally impaired adults in a professionally staffed, group setting. A social adult day care (SADC) is an adult daycare center providing non-medical, non-residential (community-based) care to functionally impaired adults. Both are regulated by the Department of Health, while SADCs are also regulated by the state Office for the Aging. They are mostly funded through Medicaid.

The state Office of Mental Health (OMH) licenses a wide range of outpatient and rehabilitative programs designed to support individuals with serious mental illness in the community. Personalized Recovery Oriented Services (PROS) programs combine treatment, rehabilitation, and support services to promote recovery, employment, and community integration. Additional programs include supportive housing linked to mental health services.

OPWDD also certifies a broad range of non-residential day and community-based programs that provide ongoing supports under HCBS waivers. These include day habilitation services focused on life skills and socialization; community habilitation services delivered in integrated community settings; prevocational services that build work readiness; and supported employment services (SEMP) that assist individuals in obtaining and maintaining competitive or customized employment.

== Public health ==
=== Immunization ===
Licensed pharmacists with a certificate of administration, and certified pharmacy interns under certified pharmacist supervision, can administer vaccines under physician or nurse practitioner prescriptions or standing orders. Nurse practitioners can issue prescriptions or standing orders to pharmacists, and standing orders to registered nurses to execute. Certified pharmacists may immunize adults against influenza, pneumococcal, zoster, hepatitis A/B, HPV, MMR, varicella, COVID-19, meningococcal, tetanus/diphtheria/pertussis, and additional ACIP-recommended immunizations authorized by the commissioner, and may immunize minors (ages 2–17) only against influenza. In September 2025, the governor issued an executive order temporarily authorizing pharmacists to prescribe and administer COVID-19 vaccines, and physicians or nurse practitioners to prescribe and issue standing orders, for patients aged 3 and older.

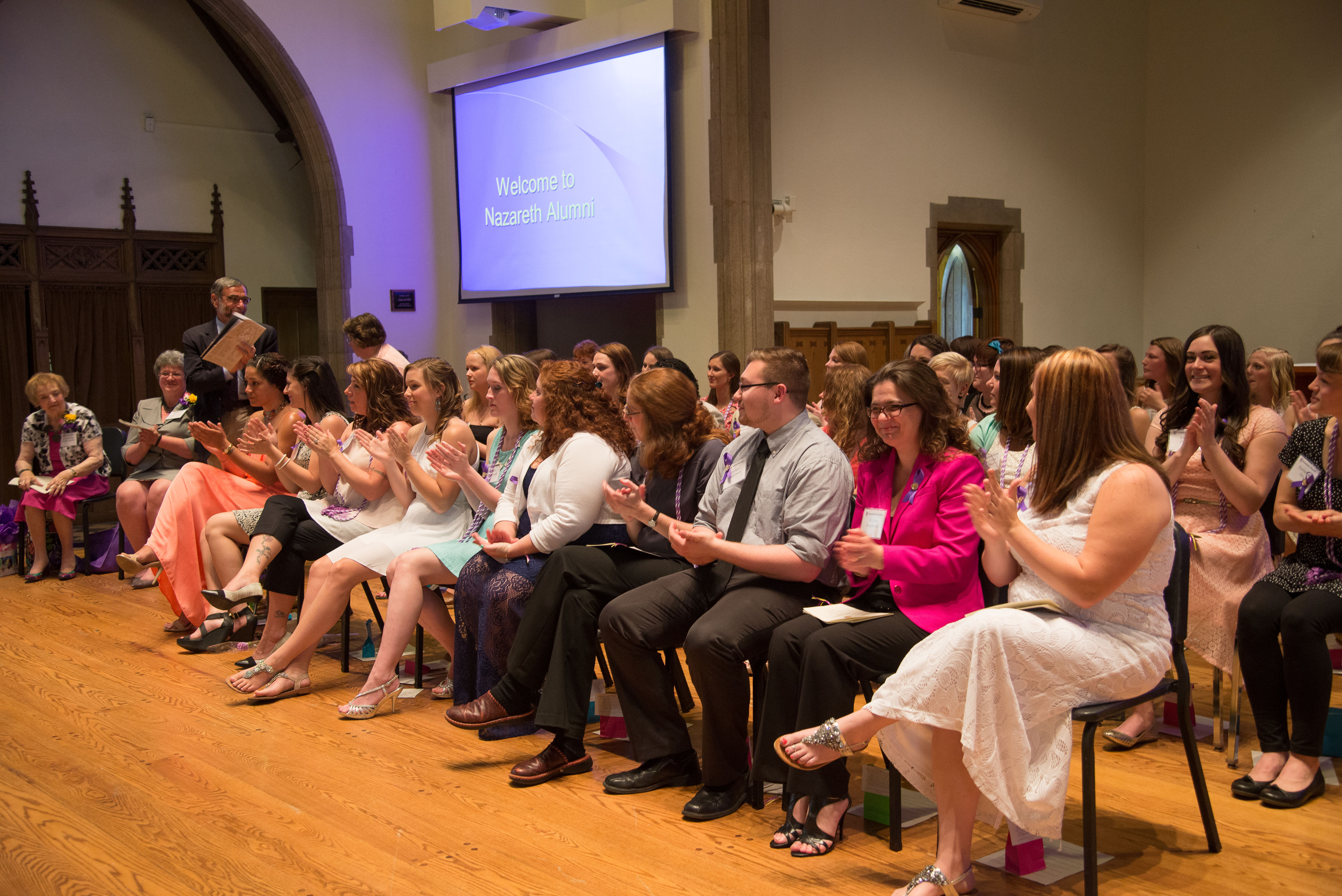
A nurse pinning ceremony at Nazareth College. Nurses represent a majority of rural public health workers.

== Workforce development ==
The state Education Department coordinates professional licensing for health professions. Its State Board for Medicine advises the Board of Regents on licensing, practice standards, and professional conduct for physicians and physician assistants. The State Board for Nursing advises on licensing, professional practice, education standards, and conduct for licensed practical nurses, registered professional nurses, nurse practitioners, and clinical nurse specialists.

New York funds graduate medical education (GME) through the Department of Health with hospital rate add-ons, HCRA-based GME and professional education pool supplemental payments, and administering programs like Empire Clinical Research Investigator Program (ECRIP) and Doctors Across New York (DANY). New York accounted for nearly half of the nation's total state Medicaid GME spending—$1.82 billion of the total $3.87 billion in 2012—and more than 10 times any other state.

== Health information ==
The Statewide Health Information Network for New York (SHIN-NY, pronounced "shiny") is the state health information exchange that allows healthcare providers to access and share patient data, and includes several regional health information organizations such as Hixny.

== Healthcare by region ==
=== New York City ===
New York City is the largest city in the United States and offers all available health care services.

=== Buffalo, New York ===
Buffalo is the second largest city in the State of New York.

== See also ==
- COVID-19 pandemic in New York (state)
- Welfare in New York
