= High Feather =

- Genre: Educational
- Country of origin: United States
- Original language: English
- No. of episodes: 10

Production
- Running time: 30 minutes

Original release
- Network: PBS
- Release: April 1980

High Feather is a 10-episode educational television show which ran on PBS in the 1980s; each episode was 30 minutes long. The program's name came from the Old English expression "High Fettle", meaning enjoying life and cheerfully doing the tasks of living. The heartfelt spirit of the show was captured in the lyrics to its theme song: "I'm in High Feather. Feel like the sun is shining on me. High Feather. I'm as free as I can be..."

The series, produced by the New York State Education Department in 1980, followed eight teenagers (four boys and four girls) at the High Feather Summer Camp, where they learn values of honesty, sportsmanship, nutrition, physical fitness, and getting along with others. The series was filmed at Camp Madison-Felicia and Camp Minisink.

Episodes included "Ballerina", where Leslie, an anorexic, starves herself to the point of exhaustion to achieve a dancer's body.

== Cast ==
The cast was an ethnically and racially diverse group of teens:

- Jacqueline Allen (Leslie Reynolds)
- Brian Goldberg (Stan Lipton)
- Virgil Hayes (Leo Bartlett)
- Richard Levey (Tom Page)
- Cindy O'Neal (Suzanne Freestone)
- Emily Wagner (Cathy Ehlers)
- Tasha Washington (Ann Campbell)
- Tino Zaldivar (Domingo Ramos)
- Robert Y R Chung (Kim -the Counselor)
- Brendan Cavanagh (Eddie)

Most of the show's young cast were not professional actors. Emily Wagner, who played Cathy, went on to appear as the character Doris Pickman on the long-running NBC medical series ER.

=== Adults ===
- Barbara Brown (Mrs. Riggs)
- Ramona Brito (Nurse)
- Powell McGill (Swim Coach)

== Episode titles ==
1. "Deep Water Test"
2. "Stan's Secret"
3. "Swifty"
4. "A Nose for News"
5. "Ballerina"
6. "Lost in the Woods"
7. "Going Home"
8. "The County Fair"
9. "Saved from the Pound"
10. "Food Follies"
