= Murry Bergtraum High School =

Public school in New York City

Murry Bergtraum High School for Business Careers

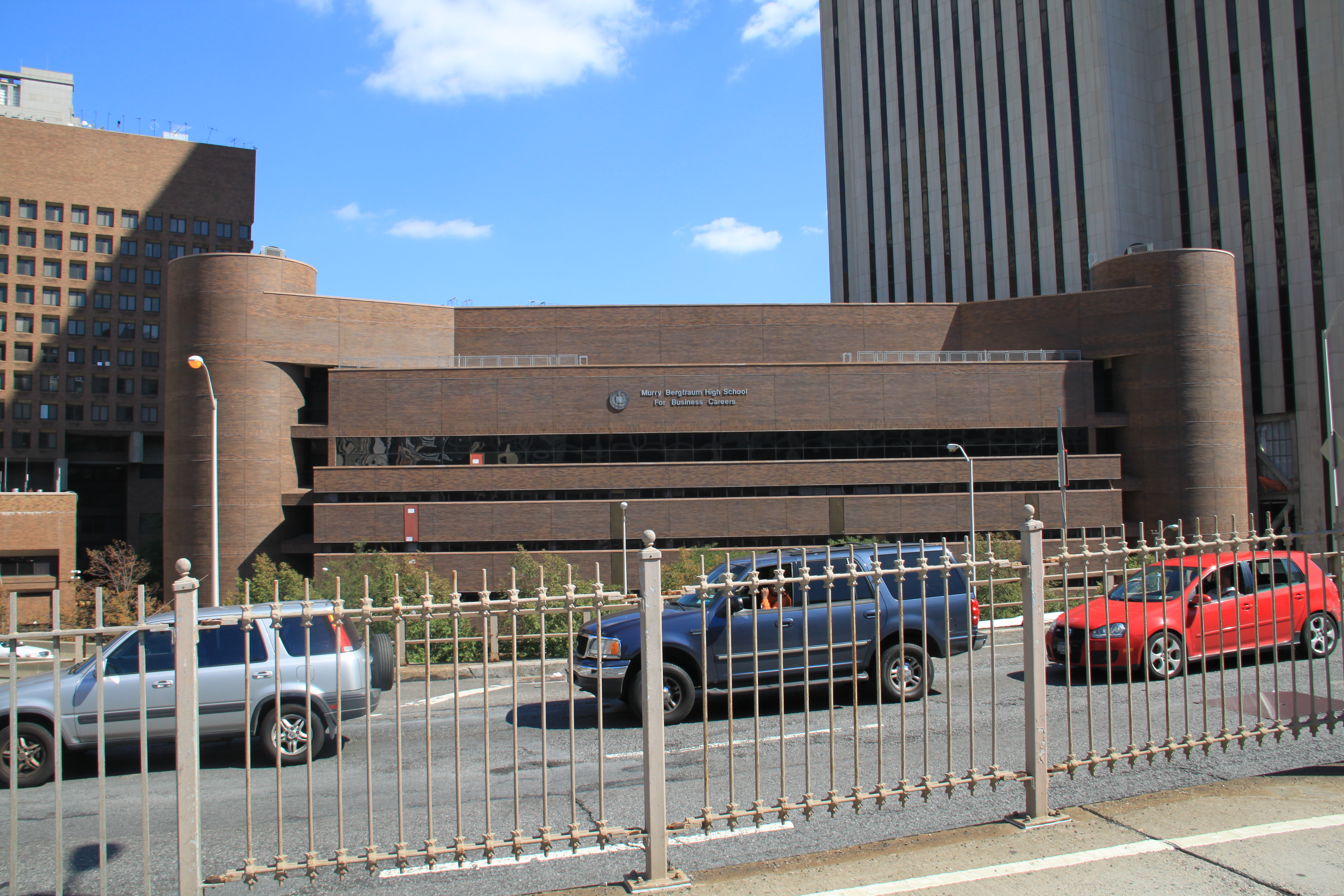

Location
- 411 Pearl Street; New York City, New York; United States; 40°42′40″N 74°00′05″W

Information
- Type: Public High School
- Established: 1975
- School board: New York City Public Schools
- School district: 2 (Geographic and Administrative)
- School number: M520
- Principal: Joyell Simmons
- Faculty: 61.0 FTEs
- Grades: 9–12
- Enrollment: 999 (as of 2014-15)
- Student to teacher ratio: 16.4:1
- Colors: Red & Gold
- Athletics: PSAL
- Mascot: Flash
- Nickname: Bergtraum; MBHS; Murry B
- Yearbook: The Montague
- Website: http://schools.nyc.gov/SchoolPortals/02/M520/default.htm

Murry Bergtraum High School for Business Careers is a public secondary school in New York City. Located in Lower Manhattan adjacent to the Brooklyn Bridge and City Hall, Bergtraum offered business-oriented courses to prepare students for careers in marketing, tourism, finance, human resources, information systems, economics, computer science, law, and secretarial fields. The school also combined its business curriculum with an academic program that gears towards preparation for college. The school integrated more humanities and liberal arts courses to enrich the school's curriculum. The building now houses several schools and enrollment at Bergstraum has fallen. It is no longer highly ranked and has been considered for merging or closure.

Murry Bergtraum High School was one of the first business-themed high schools in New York City, and inclusively, the United States. It has two sister schools that share its business theme: Norman Thomas High School (previously known as Central Commercial High School) and the High School of Economics and Finance. Out of the three schools, Murry Bergtraum is the largest of all the business high schools in this category and in the city due to its large, diverse business programs and course offerings.

It remains as one of the few large high schools in New York City as a result of Michael Bloomberg's small-school restructuring projects. It was also exempted from chancellor Joel Klein's citywide uniform curriculum initiated in 2003.

== History ==
The school was established in 1975, in memory of Murry Bergtraum, a former President of the New York City Board of Education who died in 1973. Bergtraum joined the Board of Education on May 20, 1969. He was then elected President of the Board of Education from July 1, 1970 to June 30, 1971.His widow Edith Katz Bergtraum, a public school teacher, was also politically active and a member of her local school board for 19 years. After her death in 1994, an elementary school in Queens (PS 165 in District 25) was renamed in her memory. The name "Bergtraum" originates from the German language. In the English language, it translates to "mountain dream".

Murry Bergtraum High School for Business Careers was still under construction in 1975 while the first class of freshmen were attending classes at Pace University awaiting the completion of the new high school. While at the Pace campus, an art instructor held a school logo contest. Many designs were submitted by the students. Ultimately the winner chosen by the staff was a student named Norberto Feliciano. The winning school emblem is circular in design with a triangle in the center that represents the schools aerial view shape. The name of the school is within double circles, and the school initials placed within the triangle. Olive branches were placed within the logo as a sign of peace as also seen in the flag of the United Nations. The logo is used on letter heads, notebooks, T-shirts, sweatshirts, shorts, team uniforms, and other school-branded items.

Bergtraum was the first academic comprehensive high school with business majors in New York City and one of the first in the United States. It was supported by the Downtown Lower Manhattan Association to prepare young people to enter the world of work and college.

Murry Bergtraum High School, along with other high schools of the Lower Manhattan area were the first schools evacuated during the September 11 attacks on the World Trade Center in 2001. Although Bergtraum is located on the Lower East Side of Manhattan, the school administration ordered an immediate evacuation of the building. The building was evacuated in three minutes. It was the first high school in New York City that had successful evacuation of students.

The school was labeled as a "Ground Zero" school (by the NYFD)--students were relocated to the High School of Art and Design in Upper Manhattan. The Bergtraum administration were unhappy with the relocation and appealed it, and their building was re-opened and students resumed their studies within a few days.

Bergtraum began to face new ideas of reform during the Spring Term of the 2005–2006 academic school year. Due to certain measures to improve both performance and student morale, new measures and new plans began to be introduced by the Principal and the School Leadership Team. Some of the reforms included:

- The attempt to restore the Bergtraum building after 31 years of establishment.
- A sharp decrease in the number of students admitted into the school. Incoming freshmen classes averaged to about 900 to 1000 students. As of August 2007, that number is down to approximately 800. The school currently faces a 131% overcrowding rate—that is, there are 36% more students than the building was designed to accommodate.
- The introduction of a new dress code to bring a more professional environment to the school. Students now follow a mandatory "dress for success" every Wednesday. The school uniform policy has been discontinued.

Bergtraum has had seven principals:

- Dr. Barbara Christen
- Elsie Chan
- Grace Julian
- Barbara Esmilla, who retired in June 2010
- Dr. Andrea D. Lewis, who chose to leave in August 2012
- Lottie Almonte, who was removed in August 2014
- Naima Cook (incumbent)

== Rankings ==
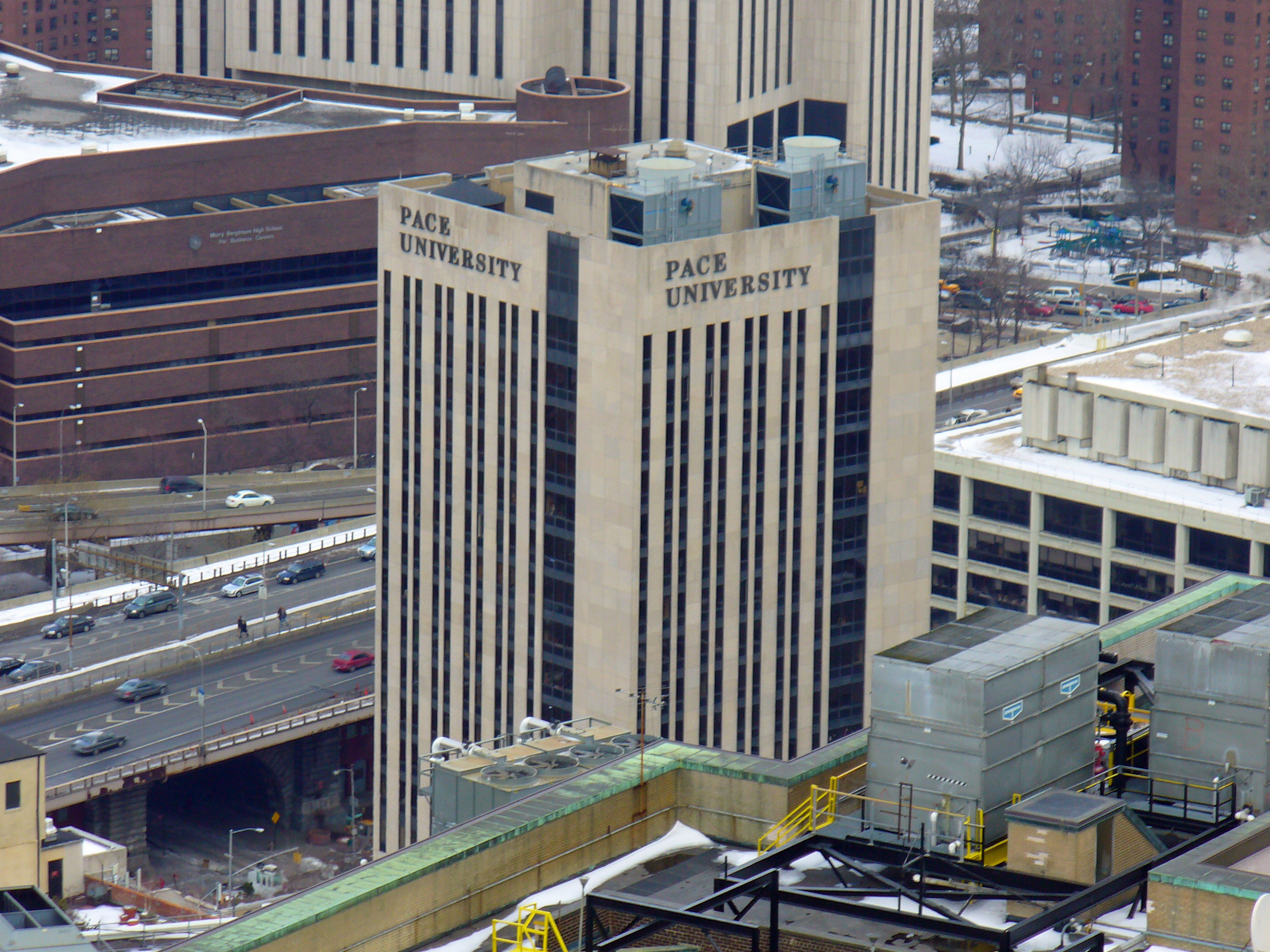
The Murry Bergtraum High School's western wing of the building, as seen from Pace University's Maria Tower

Historically, there has been an average of over 3,000 students at Bergtraum during a given year, and it has been ranked as a "School of Excellence" by U.S. News & World Report since 1999. It is well known for its girls' basketball team, having won thirteen consecutive PSAL championships as of 2011. Bergtraum offers majors in business that attracts students from all boroughs; receiving an average of 15,000 to 20,000 applications every year, making it one of the most popular schools in the city of New York. As an educational option school, it takes in students from all academic levels.

The school population is structured as follows:

- 16% of the school is formed of students who are high performers.
- 68% of the school is formed of students who are average performers.
- 16% of the school is formed of students who are low performers.

Bergtraum has also been known for its unusual triangular shape, which leads to only half of the school building having windows. The exterior sides of the building have windows, while the interior portion of the building does not. Despite the design of the building, it stays very warm in the winter and very cool during the summer because of its centralized air-conditioning system.

As of spring 2007, the school would follow a 1-8 schedule, eliminating the 3-10 and leaving very few students with a 2-9 schedule.

As of September 2009, the school began to decrease its enrollment numbers to alleviate the overcrowding rate the school faced. The school's enrollment has dropped significantly from September, 2005 in which it had roughly 3,000 students enrolled. As of July 2009, that number has decreased to 2,589.

== School facilities ==
Murry Bergtraum's facilities include:

- Three Gymnasiums. Two are on the same floor, but offer different electives. This two-in-one gym was constructed to accommodate freshmen and sophomores. The third gym, for juniors, is located on the sixth floor, and focuses on cardiovascular exercise and dance.
- Two functioning laboratories for science. All biology, chemistry, physics, and marine biology laboratories are done in these two rooms.
- A library. The Bergtraum library hosts internet service, as well as books, references, and career resources.
- Computer laboratories. These rooms were once typewriting rooms; the old outlets on the floor mark the school's history.

== Student body ==
As of the 2014–15 school year, the school had an enrollment of 999 students and 61.0 classroom teachers (on an FTE basis), for a student–teacher ratio of 16.4:1. There were 677 students (67.8% of enrollment) eligible for free lunch and 42 (4.2% of students) eligible for reduced-cost lunch.

Historically, Bergtraum's programs have catered to minority students, and the trend has not changed much since the school's opening. The ethnic composition is as follows:

- American Indian: 0.08%
- Asian American/Pacific Islander: 14.79%
- Hispanic: 49.98%
- African American: 32.60%
- White American: 2.47%
- Students Not Reported: 0.08%

Bergtraum has had more females than males in previous years. As of the 2009–2010 school year, 50.83% of Bergtraum students are female and 49.17% of Bergtraum students are male.

The building hosts students with special needs such as mental or physical disabilities, or hearing impairment. Students who use crutches can sometimes be seen throughout the building since the front stairs are not wheelchair accessible.

The school is only one out of two in Lower Manhattan that also gives admittance to English as a Second Language (ESL) students. Out of the 3,000-plus students, 11.97% are ESL students.

== Academics ==
Bergtraum had more business courses with more majors than all of the Manhattan business-themed high schools combined. Bergtraum and Norman Thomas High School are the only schools in Manhattan that allow students to concentrate with one major.

Bergtraum had eight business majors, and also allows students to take Career and Technical Education examinations, such as the Microsoft Office Specialist examination. In the accounting major, students who take the Advanced Accounting course can take an exam to obtain Certified Public Accountant qualifications. Bergtraum requires its students have a minimum of 12 business credits upon graduation.

Bergtraum is divided into 8 houses, each house representing a specific major. Students in each house, or department, study in their major for their 4 years in high school. In addition, each student must obtain a minimum of 44-50 credits in order to graduate, regardless of house. In each department, all students are mandated to take a keyboarding/business career exploration course for one year, or two semesters/terms.

=== Graduation requirements ===
Murry Bergtraum High School students face the same requirements as all students in New York City do. A minimum of 50-54 credits is required to graduate from Bergtraum, however, most of the students graduate with as many as 60 credits. Students are required to study:

- 4 years of English, and take the English Language Regents examination at the end of their Junior year.
- 3 years of Mathematics, and take the Math A and Math B Regents exam, or can substitute specific courses to earn the credits for Math B.
- 4 years of historical studies, including Global History and American History. Regents exams are taken when the student finishes each course.
- 3 years of a foreign language. Languages offered include Chinese(Level 3 and 4 only), French, and Spanish.
- 3 years of science. Regents courses are available for Living Environment Biology, Earth Science, Chemistry, and Physics. Marine Biology is available as an optional course, however no Regents exam is offered. Students must complete at least 2 Regents exams if offered Marine Biology in their freshman year. (In order to qualify for a Regents exam, students must complete 30 hours of laboratory instruction.)
- 3 and 1/2 years of physical education, and 1/2 a year of health education.
- 4 years of business study. Passing all business courses is mandated in order to graduate with the Bergtraum seal. Specific business courses will depend on the department the student is in.
- Half a year of Musical Instruction/Appreciation.
- Half a year of Art Instruction/Appreciation.
- Half a year of an Internship based class. Internship classes are held in the school.
- Work-Based Business Credit. Students who work a specific number of hours each Semester qualify to receive an elective business credit.

=== Courses and programs ===
Courses include:

- The Virtual Enterprise Initiative
- The RoadsToRiches EntrepreneurNow Program
- CollegeNow Program
- Microsoft IT Challenge – Took 1st Place 2006 (First NY Win)
- College Extension Program
- Academy of Travel and Tourism

=== Advanced Placement courses ===
Advanced Placement courses, which are eligible for college credit, include Calculus AB, English language and English literature, environmental science, accounting, United States history, and world history.

== Extracurricular activities ==
Bergtraum has many activities for students to participate in. Such activities include the Student Government/Union, Senior Council, Council For Unity, internships on and off site, and more. Academic teams and groups include Math Team, Mock Trial, Moot Court and the National Honor Society. Other clubs include: The Black Student Union, Salsa Club, Chess Club, Chinese Christian Society, Christian Society, Ambassadors Club, Model UN, Chinese Talent Society, West Indian Club, The Political Action Committee and the Asian Club.

=== Sports ===
The school participates in the Public Schools Athletic League, including basketball, bowling, cross country, handball, tennis, indoor and outdoor track, volleyball, softball, baseball, soccer, and wrestling.

== Awards and recognition ==
The school has been ranked "A School Of Excellence" by U.S. News & World Report. It has also won sports awards, The Kurt Thomas Investment Challenge, the ThinkQuest Awards and the Lincoln–Douglas debates.

== Notable alumni ==
- Afrika Baby Bam, rapper, Jungle Brothers
- Dennis Bligen, NFL player
- Shannon Bobbitt, WNBA Los Angeles Sparks player
- Jimmy Cozier, American R&B singer
- Caridad de la Luz, poet and actress
- Mike Gee, rapper, Jungle Brothers
- Vanessa Gibson, New York City Councilwoman
- Brother J, rapper and member of X Clan
- John Leguizamo, actor and comedian
- Kierna Mayo, writer, editor, and media executive
- Ali Shaheed Muhammad, DJ, producer, and member of A Tribe Called Quest
- Epiphanny Prince, WNBA Chicago Sky player
- Q-Tip, rapper, producer, actor, and member of A Tribe Called Quest
- Damon Wayans, actor and comedian
