= New York State Board of Pharmacy =

The State Board of Pharmacy is a New York State Education Department board that assists the Board of Regents and Office of the Professions on licensing, professional practice, education standards, and conduct for pharmacists, pharmacy technicians, pharmacy interns and other employees, as well as on the regulation of drugs, poisons, cosmetics, and devices.

== History ==
In 1871 a board was created for the examination and licensing of all druggists and prescription clerks in New York City. 1872 the New York City Board of Pharmacy was established in its stead. In 1884 the first State Board of Pharmacy was established to examine and license all pharmacists in the state except those under the jurisdiction of the existing local boards. In 1900 the board was reestablished and replaced the several local boards with three regional branches. In 1909 the Public Health Law was consolidated in chapter 45 of the Consolidated Laws of New York. In 1910 the board was again reestablished, but without sections and branches, and transferred to the Education Department.

== See also ==
- New York State Department of Health
- New York State Board for Medicine
