= New York's Bureau of Proprietary School Supervision =

- Abbreviation: NY BPSS

Jurisdictional structure
- Operations jurisdiction: United States

Operational structure
- Agency executive: Michael J. Hatten, Chairman
- Parent agency: New York State Education Department

Website
- www.acces.nysed.gov/bpss

New York's Bureau of Proprietary School Supervision (BPSS) oversees and monitors non-degree granting proprietary schools in New York. The Bureau of Proprietary School Supervision (BPSS) is part of the New York State Education Department (NYSED).

== Bureau Structure ==
The bureau was established to oversee educational quality of non-degree granting schools in the state of New York, including trade and business schools, English Second Language Schools (ESL), and others. Most of these schools are geared towards the adult population, providing education and job training.

The Bureau of Proprietary School Supervision provides licenses to these proprietary schools and teachers so the programs offered meet state standards. All segments of a school's operation are reviewed including financial standing, ownership structure, personnel, teaching methods, and marketing materials. The bureau has only 20 staff members to cover 500 schools, which has led to criticism of their ability to adequately manage schools. The bureau works together with local, state, and federal organizations to review the safety and equipment of all the schools. This includes investigations into student complaints, and reviews of schools to ensure compliance with Education Law and Commissioner's Regulations.

=== Licensing ===
In order to be licensed as a proprietary school within New York State, organizations must undergo a licensing process wherein they submit various documents, including: an application for a school license, proof of type of ownership (e.g., sole proprietorship, partnership, or corporation), financial documents, curriculum applications, and school prepared forms.

== Controversy ==
In April 2009, the Bureau of Proprietary School Supervision sent letters to about 80 yoga studios, warning them to immediately halt yoga-instructor training programs or face fines of up to $50,000; the Bureau based its letters on provisions of New York law requiring vocational schools to be licensed. This was part of a broader pattern of state governments seeking to regulate yoga-teacher training programs. The initiative was criticized by yoga studios and commentators. Ultimately, New York Governor David Paterson signed a bill into law exempting yoga studios from the licensing process.
