= Opening Doors =

Opening Doors may refer to:

- "Opening Doors" (Desperate Housewives), a TV episode
- Opening Doors, a version of the musical revue Sondheim on Sondheim
- "Opening Doors", a 1949 short story by Wilmar H. Shiras
- Opening Doors, a plan of the United States Interagency Council on Homelessness

== See also ==
- Opening Doors to Recovery, an American mental health project
