= Math A =

Mathematics courses named Math A, Maths A, and similar are found in:

- Mathematics education in New York: Math A, Math A/B, Math B
- Mathematics education in Australia: Maths A, Maths B, Maths C
