= New York Department of Education =

New York Department of Transportation may refer to:

- New York State Education Department
- New York City Department of Education
