= Serious mental illness =

Mental health condition that seriously impairs life activities

Serious mental illness (SMI) is characterized as any mental disorder that impairs seriously or severely from one to several significant life activities, including day-to-day functioning. Five common examples of SMI include bipolar disorders, borderline personality disorder, psychotic disorders (i.e. schizophrenia), post-traumatic stress disorders, and major depressive disorders. People having SMI experience symptoms that prevent them from having experiences that contribute to a good quality of life, due to social, physical, and psychological limitations of their illnesses. In 2021, there was a 5.5% prevalence rate of U.S. adults diagnosed with SMI, with the highest percentage being in the 18 to 25 year-old group (11.4%). Also in the study, 65.4% of the 5.5% diagnosed adults with SMI received mental health care services.

SMI is a subset of AMI, an abbreviation for any mental illness.

== Hospitalizations ==
Many people living with SMI experience institutional recidivism, which is the process of being admitted and readmitted into a hospital. This cycle is due in part to a lack of support being available for people living with SMI after being released from hospital, frequent encounters between them and the police, as well as miscommunication between clinicians and police officers. There are also instances where poor insight into one's mental illness has resulted in increased psychiatric symptoms which ultimately leads to hospitalization and a lower quality of life generally. Highly symptomatic patients are more likely to seek emergency room services. Patients with schizophrenia have the lowest risk of being hospitalized, likely due to frequent encounters with case managers to manage the chronic and persistent symptoms of schizophrenia.

To reduce the occurrence of institutional recidivism, the Georgia chapter of the National Alliance on Mental Illness (NAMI) created the Opening Doors to Recovery (ODR) program. ODR established a treatment team of licensed mental health professionals, peer specialists, and family peer specialists (a family member of someone who has SMI) to reduce institutional recidivism by providing treatment, ensuring safe housing, and supporting their recovery. SMI patients who were enrolled in ODR had less hospitalizations and fewer days in the hospital compared to their hospitalizations prior to enrollment.

Older adults with SMI are more likely to seek medical services and have longer hospital stays than patients who regularly see a doctor. People with SMI seek medical services for a variety of non-mental health conditions, including diabetes, coronary artery disease, congestive heart failure, urinary conditions, pneumonia, chronic obstructive pulmonary disease, thyroid disease, digestive conditions and cancer. This may be due to psychosomatic factors, as well as poor lifestyle habits associated with reduced mental health such as smoking, poor diet, and lack of exercise. People with SMI typically take antipsychotic medications to manage their condition, however, second-generation antipsychotics can cause poor glycemic control for patients with diabetes, furthering complications in this population. Second-generation antipsychotics, also known as atypical antipsychotics are medications used to effectively treat the positive (e.g. hallucinations and delusions) and negative (e.g. flat affect and lack of motivation) symptoms of schizophrenia. This means that people with both SMI and diabetes are more frequently readmitted to hospitals one month after their initial hospitalization. Notably, patients with SMI have increasing reports of falls and substance abuse, including alcoholism.

== Homelessness ==
Adults with SMI are 25 to 50 percent more likely to experience homelessness compared to the general population. One predictor of homelessness is poor therapeutic alliance with case managers. Adults with SMI often lack social support from family, friends and the community, which can put them at risk for experiencing homelessness. In 2019, the U.S. Department of Housing and Urban Development reported that there are 52,243 people living with SMI who were living on the street. During that time, 15,153 people with SMI were in transitional housing, which is temporary housing when people are transitioning from emergency shelters to permanent housing. 48,783 people with SMI were living in emergency shelters. People with SMI who experience homelessness have even greater difficulty accessing mental health and primary care services due to cost, lack of transportation, and lack of consistent access to a charged cell phone. These difficulties can add additional stress, which may be why people with SMI experience a high rate of suicidal ideation and suicide attempts. When surveyed, 8% of people with SMI who were homeless reported that they had made a suicide attempt in the past 30 days.

Researchers found that the housing first approach to ending homelessness improved quality of life and psychosocial functioning faster than treatment as usual, also known as standard treatment. In addition, researchers found that SMI patients remained homeless for longer and had fewer housing stability when receiving mental health services in the absence of receiving housing. Combining housing first with Assertive Community Treatment leads to improved quality of life one year after initially starting housing first compared to just receiving outpatient mental health services. Additionally, housing first reduced number of days hospitalized and number of emergency room visits for people with SMI.

== Stigma ==
People with SMI often experience stigma due to frequently stigmatizing representations of people with SMI in the media that portrays them as violent, criminals, and accountable for their condition because of weak character. People with SMI experience two kinds of stigma; public stigma and self-stigma. Public stigma refers to negative beliefs/perceptions that the public has about SMI; such as people with SMI should be feared, are irresponsible, that they should be responsible for their life decisions, and that they are childlike, needing constant care. Self-stigma refers to prejudice that an individual with SMI may feel about themselves, such as "I am dangerous. I am afraid of myself. I am worthless.". This can also manifest as an internalization of public stigma. In a study conducted on patients who were involuntarily hospitalized, researchers found that poor quality of life and low self-esteem could be predicted by high levels of self-stigma and fewer experiences of empowerment. Self-stigma can be reduced by increasing empowerment in individuals with SMI through counseling and/or peer support and other self-disclosing of their own struggles with mental illness. People who suffer from SMI can reduce the amount of stigma that they experience by maintaining insight into their condition with the assistance of social supports. Consumer services, such as drop-in centers, peer support, mentoring services, and educational programs can increase empowerment in individuals with SMI.
