= New York State Board for Social Work =

The New York State Board for Social Work is a New York State Education Department board that assists the Board of Regents and the Office of the Professions on licensing, professional practice, and conduct for licensed master social workers (LMSWs) and licensed clinical social workers (LCSWs). Social work is an academic discipline and practice-based profession concerned with meeting the basic needs of individuals, families, groups, communities, and society as a whole to enhance their individual and collective well-being. New York is not part of the Social Work Licensure Compact.

== Licensure ==
Licensure as an LMSW requires a master's degree in social work from a program registered by the department or accredited by an acceptable accrediting agency, such as the Council on Social Work Education (CSWE). Licensure as an LCSW also requires at least 12 semester hours of clinical coursework and three years of supervised post-graduate clinical experience in diagnosis, psychotherapy, and assessment-based treatment planning. The LCSW candidate's supervisor must be an LCSW, a licensed psychologist qualified in psychotherapy (such as by completing a program accredited by the APA), or a psychiatrist who was a diplomate of the ABPN or equivalent.

Candidates must pass an examination offered by the Association of Social Work Boards (ASWB) or another organization approved by the department, with the passing score set by the board.

Continuing education must be taken from department-approved providers, which may include CSWE-accredited programs, psychotherapy institutes chartered by the Board of Regents, national and state social work organizations such as the National Association of Social Workers (NASW), national organizations of social work licensing boards such as the ASWB, and entities operating under the Mental Hygiene Law or hospitals under the Public Health Law. New York is the only state that does not accept the ASWB's Approved Continuing Education (ACE) program.

Certain persons are exempt from licensure:

- Professionals licensed in medicine, psychology, nursing, occupational therapy, applied behavior analysis, and the mental health practitioner professions may practice within their own scope but may not use the LMSW or LCSW titles.
- New York does not license bachelor's-level social workers, but BSW graduates may perform LMSW-level services under supervision, and LMSWs may perform clinical social work in a facility setting under supervision.
- Attorneys, rape crisis counselors, credentialed alcoholism and substance abuse counselors, clergy providing pastoral counseling, and supervised social work students are also exempt, and individuals, churches, schools, and organizations may provide instruction, advice, support, or information within the scope of licensed master social work.
- Unlicensed persons may perform certain tasks, such as eligibility screening, referrals, and service plans in areas such as housing, public assistance, child protective services, and foster care, provided the plan is not a behavioral health diagnosis or treatment plan.
- Employees of programs operated, regulated, funded, or approved by certain state and local government agencies who were employed by 24 June 2022 remain exempt for as long as they stay employed.

== Analysis and criticism ==
Candidates must pass an examination offered by the Association of Social Work Boards (ASWB) or another organization approved by the department, with the passing score set by the board. A 2022 ASWB analysis found substantially lower first-time pass rates among Black and Hispanic candidates than among White candidates, which the ASWB attributed to broader systemic inequities.

== History ==
The State Board of Examiners of Certified Social Workers was created in 1965. Its name was changed to the State Board for Social Work in 1971.

Effective September 2004, the title-protected certified social worker license was replaced with the LMSW and LCSW licenses, restricting both the titles and the practice of social work. After practice restrictions took effect, many nonprofit agencies that had long provided social work services were found to be in violation of corporate practice prohibitions, which prevented the department from accepting clinical experience obtained in those settings, until 2010 statutory changes authorized the department to issue waivers.

The continuing education requirements were effective January 2015.

The board formerly administered the "R" privilege, previously the "P" psychotherapy privilege, which required three years of additional post-licensure experience for LCSWs to qualify for insurance reimbursement; it was eliminated effective January 2023, though LCSWs who earned it retain the designation.

== See also ==
- New York State Board for Mental Health Practitioners
