= New York State Board for Nursing =

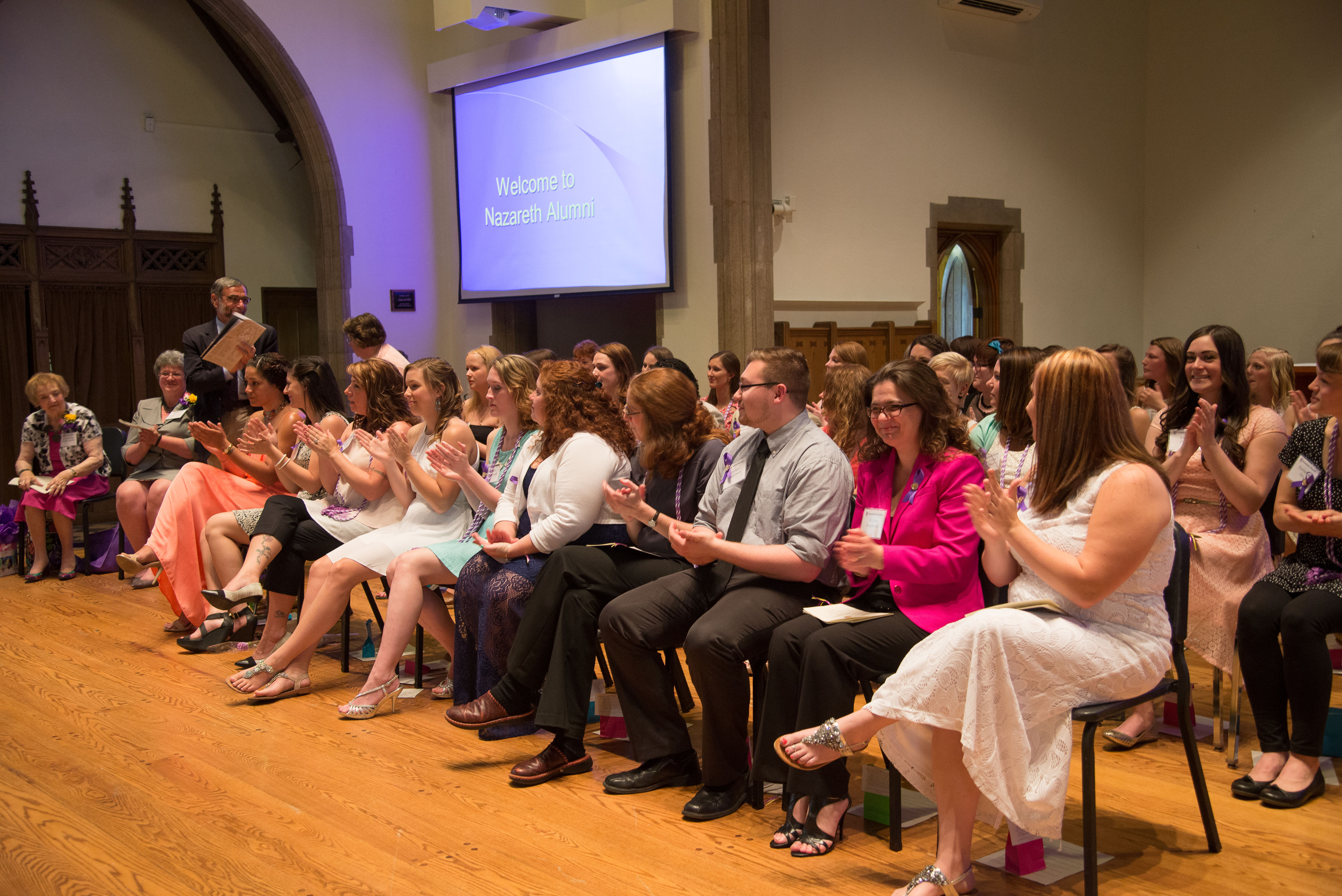
A nurse pinning ceremony at Nazareth College

The New York State Board for Nursing is a New York State Education Department board that advises the Board of Regents and the Office of the Professions on licensing, professional practice, education standards, and conduct for licensed practical nurses (LPN), registered professional nurses (RN), nurse practitioners (NP), and clinical nurse specialists (CNS). The Board also participates in disciplinary proceedings and recommends changes to laws and regulations governing the nursing profession. New York is one of the few states that has not joined the Nurse Licensure Compact.

The board does not regulate unlicensed assistive personnel such as certified nurse aides, feeding assistants, personal care aides, or home health aides, which are overseen through Department of Health training, competency, and registry frameworks rather than licensure under the Education Law.

Map of Nurse Licensure Compact states. US nurses are not allowed to practice in New York without more. NLC member

== History ==
The regulation of nursing in New York began with the Nurse Practice Act of 1903.

In 2010, Republican Asm. Robert Castelli first proposed joining the Nurse Licensure Compact (NLC). Other Republicans like minority leader Sen. Rob Ortt have consistently and repeatedly introduced bills, and the Democratic-led committees have consistently withheld them without a vote. Opposition from unions like the New York State Nurses Association and National Nurses United argue that joining the compact would lower state licensing standards, undermine union protections, and fail to address the root causes of the nurse staffing crisis such as wages, working conditions, and enforcement of staffing laws. Health Commissioner James McDonald testified in support of joining the compact in 2023. Gov. Hochul's fiscal year 2025 and 2026 budget proposals to join the compact were rejected by the Legislature.

== See also ==
- New York State Department of Health
- New York State Board for Medicine
- New York State Board for Mental Health Practitioners
