= New York State Board for Dietetics and Nutrition =

The New York State Board for Dietetics and Nutrition is a New York State Education Department board that assists the Board of Regents in matters related to the certification and professional conduct of certified dietitians and certified nutritionists. Certification differs from licensure in that it does not protect the scope of practice, i.e. anyone can practice, but instead only protects use of the certified title.

== Requirements ==
To be eligible for certification as a dietitian-nutritionist in New York, an individual must be at least 18 years old, pass a certification examination satisfactory to the Department, and must have completed either:

- A bachelor's degree or higher in dietetics, nutrition, or a closely related field from a program registered with or deemed acceptable by the Department, and
  - the completion of at least six months of planned work experience; or
- An associate's degree in dietetics or nutrition from a registered or acceptable program, and
  - a combination of education and experience totaling ten years full-time equivalent in the past fifteen years,
  - including at least two and a half years of planned work experience, and
  - endorsements from three certified or registered dietitian-nutritionists.

Accreditation Council for Education in Nutrition and Dietetics (ACEND or CADE) accredited programs are generally accepted in practice. Commission on Dietetic Registration (CDR) certification exams are generally accepted in practice.

== History ==
The board was created in 1991.

Organizations like the New York State Academy of Nutrition and Dietetics support licensure instead of certification, emphasizing the need for standardized qualifications and public protection. Groups such as CrossFit have opposed licensure bills, fearing that new regulations could restrict fitness professionals from offering nutrition advice. Some medical professionals like the New York State Medical Society have also opposed licensure out of concern over the use of terms like "medical nutrition therapy", suggesting that such terminology could blur the lines between nutrition counseling and medical diagnosis.
