= New York State Board for Mental Health Practitioners =

The New York State Board for Mental Health Practitioners is a New York State Education Department board responsible for overseeing the licensing and regulation of mental health practitioners in the state. Four professions are licensed:

- Mental health counselor
- Marriage and family therapist
- Creative arts therapist
- Psychoanalyst

New York is not one of the approximately three-quarters of the states in the Counseling Compact.

== History ==
The board was created by the Mental Health Practitioners Act in 2002.

== See also ==
- New York State Office of Addiction Services and Supports (OASAS)
- New York State Office of Mental Health (OMH)
- New York State Office for People With Developmental Disabilities (OPWDD)
- New York State Board for Social Work
- New York State Board for Medicine
- New York State Board for Nursing
