= State Supplementation Program =

Government aid program

The State Supplement Program (SSP or SSI/SSP), not to be confused with SNAP, is the state supplement to the U.S. federal Supplemental Security Income (SSI) program and provides state funded supplement benefits to SSI recipients.

This program aims at providing a complementary financial support to individuals and couples who are elderly (usually 65 years of age and older), legally blind, or partially or fully disabled. The financial support can be considered as a global support, as it is not tied to any kind of expense. It can be used in a variety of ways, from housekeeping once in a while to daily residential care for individuals for who certain everyday tasks are difficult or impossible to do by themselves.

However, very few states apply the exact same criteria of eligibility as the federal ones. The states who do let the Social Security Administration manage their SSP (see section Apply for the State Supplement Program). Except from the states of Arizona, Mississippi, North Dakota, Northern Mariana Islands, and West Virginia; every state currently offers a state supplement to the federal SSI through the State Supplement Program. The conditions of eligibility to the supplement and the amount vary between the different states. The amount of the SSP ranges from $10 to $400 depending on the state. In 2020, the maximum amount of the SSI is $783 per month for an eligible individual, and $1175 for an eligible couple.

== Usual State Supplementation Program eligibility criteria ==
SSP eligibility criteria vary between states but we can identify the following as being the most common:

- Grandfathered SSI recipients;
- Individuals with an ineligible spouse;
- SSI recipients who are over age 65;
- SSI recipients who are blind or disabled;
- Individuals determined eligible for SSP by the Developmental Disabilities Administration; or;
- Certain individuals who are eligible for SSI and are in foster care

== State Supplementation Program amount variation factors ==
The amount paid to an eligible person will be calculated based on the following factors:

- living arrangements,
- income; and
- county of residence

These primary factors serve as a base to determine individual needs. The states who administer the SSP themselves may use additional factors to determine the amount which will be paid.

== Apply for the State Supplement Program ==
The application for the SSP has to be done to the state directly. In some states however, no application is necessary as the state supplement is administered by the Social Security Administration. The Social Security Administration will determine the eligibility of the citizens in these states and pay the SSP along with the SSI. The states for which the SSP is administered by the Social Security Administration are the following: California, Hawaii, Michigan, Montana, Nevada, New Jersey, and Vermont. In these states, only one payment is made to include both the SSI and the SSP, combining federal and state benefits.

In some states, SSP is dually administrated. Social Security administers some categories of State supplement payments, while the State administers other categories of supplemental payments. The states with a dual administration of the SSP are Delaware, District of Columbia, Iowa, Pennsylvania, and Rhode Island. It is therefore necessary to check with the state if is eligible to the SSP under the federal or state criteria.

== Amount of the benefits when the State Supplement Program is partially or fully administered by the Social Security Administration in 2020 ==
State	Elderly	Blind	Disabled
California	$943.72/ $1,582.14	$1,000.23/ $1,733.19	$943.72/ $1,582.14
Delaware	$773/ $1,175	$773/ $1,175	$773/ $1,175
Hawaii	$783/ $1,175	$783/ $1,175	$783/ $1,175
Iowa	$783/ $1,175	$805/ $1,219	$783/ $1,175
Michigan	$783/ $1,175	$783/ $1,175	$783/ $1,175
Montana	$783/ $1,175	$783/ $1,175	$783/ $1,175
Nevada	$819.40/ $1,249.46	$892.30/ $1,549.60	$783/ $1,175
New Jersey	$814.25/ $1,200.36	$814.25/ $1,200.36	$814.25/ $1,200.36
Pennsylvania	$783/ $1,175	$783/ $1,175	$783/ $1,175
Rhode Island	$783/ $1,175	$783/ $1,175	$783/ $1,175
Vermont	$835.04/ $1,273.88	$835.04/ $1,273.88	$835.04/ $1,273.88
Washington, D.C.	$783/ $1,175	$783/ $1,175	$783/ $1,175

== End of the benefits of the State Supplement Program ==
A person will benefit from the State Supplement Program for as long as they fit the eligibility criteria set by the state. The payments will automatically stop if they do not fit the criteria anymore. Furthermore, any change in a person’s living arrangements must be reported to the authority issuing the payments and can lead to an adjustment of the amount paid to the person. Should a person not be eligible to receive the SSI anymore, they will not be a part of the SSP as well as the SSP is a complementary program to the federal Supplementary Security Income program.

== Specificities by state (non exhaustive list) ==
=== Massachusetts ===
It is possible not be to eligible for SSI but to be eligible for Massachusetts’ SSP. That is because the maximum income to be eligible for SSP in Massachusetts is higher than the one set for the federal SSI.

However, in order to apply for the SSP, it is needed to apply for SSI first even a person is not eligible for the SSI but only for the SSP. Benefits are paid at the beginning of each month.

=== New Hampshire ===
Eligibility criteria in New Hampshire are the following:

- being a resident of 65 years of age or older;
- being a resident between the ages of 18 and 64, and is determined by the State to be physically or mentally disabled, partially or fully; and
- being a resident of any age who is determined by the State to be legally blind.
