= New York State Board for Medicine =

The New York State Board for Medicine is a New York State Education Department board that advises the Board of Regents and the Office of the Professions on licensing, practice standards, and professional conduct for physicians and physician assistants. The State Department of Health's Office of Professional Medical Conduct and State Board for Professional Medical Conduct are responsible for investigating and adjudicating complaints against physicians, physician assistants, and specialist assistants. New York is one of the few states that has not joined the Interstate Medical Licensure Compact.

== History ==
In 1806 county medical societies were authorized, with a State Medical Society formed by their delegates, and gave them authority to license the practice of medicine.

Health Commissioner James McDonald testified in support of joining the Interstate Medical Licensure Compact and Nurse Licensure Compact in 2023.

== See also ==
- New York State Department of Health
- New York State Board for Nursing
- New York State Board for Mental Health Practitioners

== General references ==
- Walsh, James Joseph (1907). History of the Medical Society of the State of New York: 1807-1906. New York: Medical Society of the State of New York. OCLC 1046504585.
