= Opening Doors to Recovery =

Opening Doors to Recovery is a project to provide case management and mental health services to adults with mental illness in southeast Georgia, United States. The project is led by National Alliance on Mental Illness Georgia and funded by several private and public organization. Emory University and the Georgia Department of Behavioral Health and Developmental Disabilities (DHBDD) are also participants in the project.

Funders of the project include Bristol-Myers Squibb Foundation, the Georgia Department of Behavioral Health and Developmental Disabilities, and CSX Transportation. Former First Lady of the United States Rosalynn Carter has endorsed the program.
