= Nurse Licensure Compact =

Reciprocal recognition of nursing license

The Nurse Licensure Compact (NLC) is an agreement that allows for the mutual recognition (reciprocity) of nursing licenses between member U.S. states ("compact states"). Enacted into law by the participating states, the NLC allows a nurse who is a legal resident of and possesses a nursing license in a compact state (their "home state") to practice in any of the other compact states (the "remote states") without obtaining additional licensure in the remote states. It applies to both registered and practical nurses and is also referred to as a multistate license.

Per the NLC rules, nurses who are licensed in and legal residents of a compact state may not hold licenses from other compact states – that is, they can only hold one compact state license at a time, which must be from their home state, and a nurse temporarily practicing in a remote state retains their license in their home state. However, if a nurse changes their primary state of residence from one compact state to another, they must transfer their license by applying for licensure by endorsement in the new home state; upon issuance of the new home state license, the license from the former home state is inactivated.

A license obtained in a compact state that is not one's state of legal residency is not recognized by the other compact members, so nurses who are legal residents of non-compact states must obtain licenses for each compact state in which they wish to practice.

== History ==
In 1997, the National Council of State Boards of Nursing (NCSBN) proposed a mutual-recognition licensure model to address concerns that traditional single-state licensing was overly restrictive and economically inefficient. The proposal culminated in the 1999 release of the Nurse Licensure Compact (NLC), with the first states joining in 2000.

Several states and organizations expressed reservations regarding the NLC, citing concerns over the erosion of local regulatory control, potential losses in licensing fee revenue, and discrepancies in disciplinary standards and background check protocols. In response, the NCSBN began revising the framework between 2014 and 2015, resulting in the Enhanced Nurse Licensure Compact (eNLC). Approved by NCSBN members in 2015, this updated version implemented 11 uniform licensure requirements, such as mandatory federal criminal background checks and standardized disciplinary provisions. Adoption by states began in 2016, and the eNLC became effective in early 2018, superseding the original NLC model.

A similar agreement, the APRN Compact, was also developed in 2002 to provide multistate privileges for advanced practice registered nurses, aligning with the APRN Consensus Model for independent practice and prescriptive authority. The APRN compact is scheduled to take effect once either seven or ten jurisdictions join. ^{[13]}^{[14]}

== Participation ==
=== Participating Jurisdictions ===
Map of Nurse Licensure Compact NLC Member

As of November, 2026, the 41 NLC states are:

- Alabama
- Arizona
- Arkansas
- Colorado
- Connecticut
- Delaware
- Florida
- Georgia
- Idaho
- Indiana
- Iowa
- Kansas
- Kentucky
- Louisiana
- Maine
- Maryland
- Massachusetts (tentative implementation date: May, 2027)
- Mississippi
- Missouri
- Montana
- Nebraska
- New Hampshire
- New Jersey
- New Mexico
- North Carolina
- North Dakota
- Ohio
- Oklahoma
- Pennsylvania
- Rhode Island
- South Carolina
- South Dakota
- Tennessee
- Texas
- Utah
- Vermont
- Virginia
- Washington
- West Virginia
- Wisconsin
- Wyoming
- The U.S. Virgin Islands has passed NLC legislation and entered the compact, but is awaiting an implementation date
- Guam has a partial implementation, which allows nurses who hold active, multistate NLC licenses to practice in Guam. Nurses who claim Guam as their primary place of residency, however, cannot apply for a multistate license until the NLC is fully implemented.

=== Non-Participating Jurisdictions ===
The District of Columbia and nine states have not joined the NLC, though legislation to join has been proposed in each of these jurisdictions. The state with an active NLC bill is Michigan.

==== New York ====
In New York, Republican Asm. Robert Castelli first proposed joining the compact in 2010. Other Republicans like minority leader Sen. Rob Ortt have consistently and repeatedly introduced bills, and the Democratic-led committees have consistently withheld them without a vote. Opposition from unions like the New York State Nurses Association and National Nurses United argue that joining the compact would lower state licensing standards, undermine union protections, and fail to address the root causes of the nurse staffing crisis such as wages, working conditions, and enforcement of staffing laws.

Commissioner of Health James McDonald testified in support of joining the compact in 2023. Democratic Gov. Kathy Hochul's fiscal year 2025 and 2026 budget proposals to join the compact were rejected by the Legislature.

== Evaluation ==
An analysis of data from 2016 to 2021 found that the NLC increased mobility for registered nurses and licensed practical nurses by 11%. An analysis of online survey responses collected between 2018 and 2022 from over 66,000 nurses found that 45% had provided out-of-state nursing services in the past two years, compared to 35% when a similar survey was conducted in 2014.
