= New York State Education Department =

Department of the New York state government

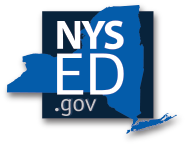

Department overview
- Formed: December 10, 1913; 112 years ago
- Jurisdiction: New York
- Headquarters: Albany, New York, U.S.; 42.653822°N 73.756336°W
- Department executives: Betty A. Rosa, Commissioner of Education and President of the University of the State of New York; Sharon Cates-Williams, Executive Deputy Commissioner; Jeffrey Matteson, Senior Deputy Commissioner for Education Policy (P-12 and Higher Education)
- Key document: Education Law
- Website: nysed.gov

The New York State Education Department (NYSED) is the department of the New York state government responsible for the supervision for all public schools in New York and all standardized testing, as well as the production and administration of state tests and Regents Examinations. In addition, the State Education Department oversees higher education, cultural institutions such as museums and libraries, vocational rehabilitation, and the licensing of numerous professions. It is headed by the Board of Regents of the University of the State of New York (USNY) and administered by the Commissioner of Education.

Its regulations are compiled in title 8 of the New York Codes, Rules and Regulations. The main offices of the department are housed in the New York State Department of Education Building, located at 89 Washington Avenue in Albany, the state capital.

Each year New York spends around $32,000 per student, which is 90% more than the average in the US.

== Learning standards ==
The general education and diploma requirement regulations (Part 100 Regulations, 8 NYCRR 100) require that every public school student be provided an opportunity to receive instruction in order to achieve the New York State Learning Standards. The creation of new Common Core State Standards are now being introduced and phased in. The new standards and related new assessments will be inline by 2014-2015.

The Board of Regents adopted the Common Core State Standards (CCSS) for Mathematics and CCSS for English Language Arts & Literacy in History/Social Studies, Science, and Technical Subjects on July 19, 2010, with the understanding that the state may add additional expectations. It incorporated New York-specific additions on January 10, 2011, creating the Common Core Learning Standards (CCLS). The Board of Regents adopted a new social studies curriculum (the New York State Common Core Social Studies Framework) at its April 2014 meeting. At its December 2016 meeting, the Board of Regents approved new P-12 Science Learning Standards.

=== Graduation rates ===
New York has a graduation rate of 80.2 percent (2017), Compared to National Average of 84 percent. This was a slight increase over previous year, but that may have been because the State eliminated one of the tests required to graduate.

== Budget ==
In 2015, New York spent $67 billion, or $22,366 per-student in elementary and secondary schools. (U.S. Census data 2016). This is 90% higher than the US average of $11,762, and significantly higher than neighboring states with similar living expenses. The spending has increased in recent years by 5.5% between 2015 and 2016 alone. Schools in poor high need districts received significantly lower funding.

== Assessments and testing ==
=== State exams ===
The NY State Education Department requires that all students in grades 3-8 take state tests in the areas of Mathematics, English, Science. Previously it was mandated that students take a Social Studies standardized test; this has been discontinued.

=== Regents exams ===
Regents exams are administered to New York high school students in the subjects of English, Mathematics, Science, Social Studies and a LOTE (Language other than English). Students who decide not to study a foreign language may make up the regents credit by taking an appropriate number of business education, art, music, and technology classes. The Regulations of the Commissioner of Education require that all public school students earn passing scores on State examinations in the areas of English, mathematics, United States history and government, science, and global history and geography to obtain a high school diploma. Students, for instance some with IEPs for special needs, who cannot pass the Regents exams may receive a local diploma by passing the RCT (Regents Competency Test). On July 22, 2013 (and again at their October 21–22, 2013 meeting), the Board of Regents adopted regulations that established requirements to transition to the new Regents Examinations in English Language Arts (ELA) and in mathematics which measure the Common Core Learning Standards (CCLS).

=== Data collection and assessment ===
In order to improve school performance across the state, NYSED developed a Data Warehouse for the purposes of tracking performance data connected to state examinations. Each K-12 public school student is assigned a unique 10-digit identifier (NYSSIS) which is captured in the SIRS database (NYS Student Information Repository System) for the purposes of data assessment in connection with state examinations and school report card analysis from state to the local level.

As student test results are analyzed and checked for accuracy the Data Warehouse system allows for certain data characteristics to be collected and processed for further school improvement and decision making at the local as well as statewide level.

- Level 0 (regional) represents the regional or local level where individual schools, at the district level, input state assessment results and check for accuracy in data reporting (for example, School district level). Schools often use software utilities and online analytical tools to make school improvement decisions and examine changes in overall curriculum planning at a district wide level.
- Level 1 (regional) represents a second regional or local level where data is placed after Level 0 data has been submitted for aggregate processing. For example, New York State BOCES Regional Information Center (RIC) or large city level.
- Level 1C (regional) represents repository data ready for migration to the state repository level
- Level 2 (statewide) represents a statewide repository where data is moved. Includes name and unique identifier for comparative and independent school performance and analysis.
- Level 3 (statewide) represents locked assessment data used for state use, such as school report cards and decisions involving accountability. For privacy reasons, no names are used and unique identifiers are encrypted.

Many districts throughout the state have been advised to develop both Data Administrator or Chief Information Officer positions as well as Data Committees to examine the validity and accuracy of submissions to various levels of the data warehouse.

=== School report cards ===
With much recent focus on school accountability, New York State Education Department published annual student report cards (data.nysed.gov) and uses a systematic approach to determining how tests and other assessment data can be reported by local schools and the communities they support.

=== Accountability ===
The Office of Accountability (OA) administers New York's accountability system under the Every Student Succeeds Act (ESSA) by identifying indicators of school and district performance.

| Elementary-Middle | High School |
|---|---|
Weighted Average Achievement
Core Subject Performance
English Language Proficiency
Chronic Absenteeism
| Student Growth (Information Only) | Graduation Rate |
| | College, Career, and Civic Readiness (Informational Only) |

Indicator levels are calculated for the school and district as a whole and school and district subgroups, which include economically disadvantaged students, students with disabilities, English language learners, and racial and ethnic groups.

OA then uses indicator levels to calculate accountability status determinations for school and school subgroups. Schools that fall within the bottom 5% of New York schools or whose graduation rate is below 67% are assigned an accountability support model of Comprehensive Support and Improvement (CSI). Schools whose subgroups meet criteria used to identify the bottom 5% of New York schools for two consecutive years may be assigned Targeted Support and Improvement (TSI). Schools or subgroups that do not fall within the bottom 5% identified for CSI or TSI are identified for Local Support and Improvement (LSI). Based on the accountability support model a school is assigned, various resources may be made available by the state.

Each year, the Commissioner publishes a report highlighting which schools have been taken off the list and which schools have been added.

== Teaching license requirements ==
In order to teach in New York, the applicant must hold a valid New York State Teaching License. Most new certified teachers come from state-accredited teaching programs in colleges or universities either in New York or another state that has a reciprocal agreement with New York. Prior to initial certification, prospective teachers must pass:

- the Educating All Students Test (EAS)
- a Content Specialty Test (CST) appropriate to the subject the applicant wishes to teach.

*The edTPA Portfolio Assessment will no longer be a certification requirement as of April 27, 2022.

This initial teacher certification is temporary and expires after five years. Candidates may expect to pay, as of 2014, up to eight hundred dollars for certification tests and requirements.

To obtain a professional certificate, the applicant must have completed a state-accredited teacher education program at a college/university and hold a master's degree or above, and must have completed three years of full-time teaching experience. New York no longer offers permanent certification to those who were not certified prior to February 2004. To maintain a professional certificate, a teacher must complete 100 hours of professional development every five years. These professional development hours are decreased by a few percentage points for every year teaching in a non-public school. One does not have to teach in New York State to maintain their certificate as many New York certified teachers teach in Connecticut and New Jersey.

=== Foreign teachers and career changers ===
Career changers and others who did not graduate from a teacher education program can earn a teaching certificate by completing the above-mentioned tests, completing satisfactory education coursework in college, and finally apply for a license for teaching with the NYSED Office of Teaching Initiatives. Some new teachers have college degrees in an academic field (e.g. English or history but do not have a teaching certificate. If they wish to enter teaching, they must have a baccalaureate degree with a satisfactory GPA, take all of the above-mentioned tests, and apply for a license with the Office of Teaching Initiatives.

Programs such as the New York City Teaching Fellows allow uncertified teachers to teach under a transitional license, provided that they have received a bachelor's degree, passed the LAST and the CST in their area, and are enrolled in a cooperating master's degree program. Teachers with a Transitional B license have three years to apply for their Initial Certification, which requires completion of student teaching, education coursework, subject-area coursework, and the ATS-W exam.

=== Teachers from another state ===
Applicants who hold a certificate from another state, or who have completed an approved program that would lead to a teaching certificate in another state, may be eligible for a New York teaching certificate through interstate reciprocity.

=== Other educational professions ===
The department also oversees and awards the Pupil Personnel Certificate, which is certification for other professionals who have direct contact with students. This includes the following fields: School Social Worker, School Psychologist, School Counselor, School Attendance Teacher, School Nurse Teacher and School Dental Hygiene Teacher. These certificates are still permanent unless revoked with cause.

=== Literacy requirement ===
In March 2017, the board of regents eliminated a literacy test for prospective teachers because, according to The New York Times, "the test proved controversial because black and Hispanic candidates passed it at significantly lower rates than white candidates."

== Non-teacher occupational licensing ==
In addition to licensing teachers, the department coordinates professional licensing for all other professions that must receive state licenses. The Office of the Professions provides administrative support, enforces laws and regulations, and manages the overall licensing process. The state boards develop licensing standards, advise on professional practice, and review disciplinary cases; there are state boards for:

- Acupuncture
- Applied Behavior Analysis
- Architecture
- Athletic Trainers, Committee for (to assist Medical Board)
- Certified Shorthand Reporting
- Chiropractic
- Clinical Laboratory Technology
- Dentistry
- State Board for Dietetics and Nutrition
- Engineering, Land Surveying and Geology
- Interior Design
- Landscape Architecture
- Massage Therapy
- Medical Physics, Committee for (to assist Medical Board)
- State Board for Medicine
- State Board for Mental Health Practitioners
- Midwifery
- State Board for Nursing
- Occupational Therapy
- Ophthalmic Dispensing
- Optometry
- Pathologists' Assistants, Committee for (to assist Medical Board)
- Perfusion, Committee for (to assist Medical Board)
- State Board of Pharmacy
- Physical Therapy
- Podiatry
- Professional Assistance, Committee for
- Psychology
- Public Accountancy
- Respiratory Therapy (includes Polysomnographic Technology)
- State Board for Social Work
- Speech-Language Pathology and Audiology
- Veterinary Medicine

== See also ==
- Mathematics education in New York
- Global Studies
- List of school districts in New York
- University of the State of New York
- New York State Summer School of the Arts
- New York City Department of Education
