= List of Golden Gate University people =

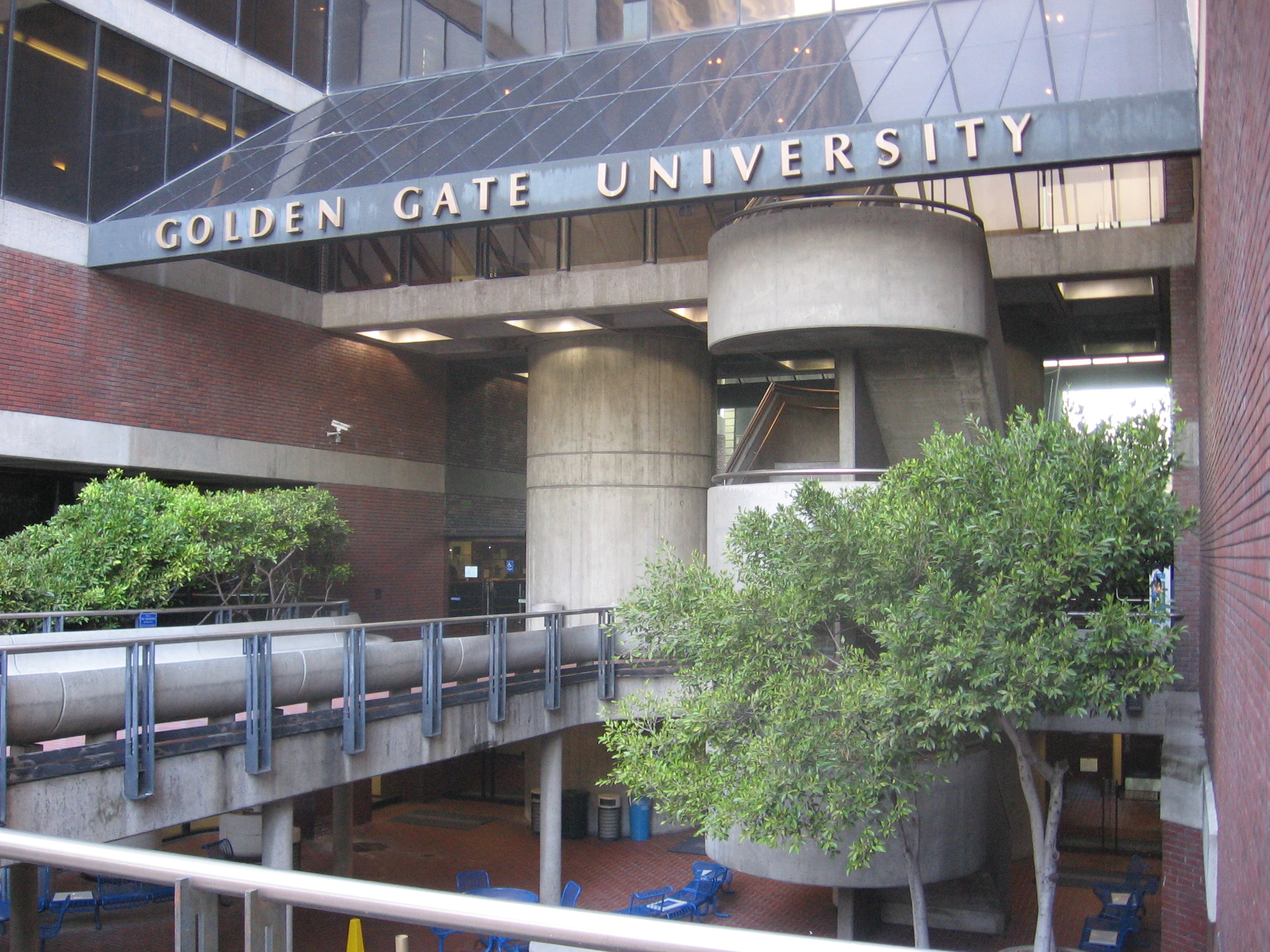
Mission Street entrance to GGU's San Francisco campus

This is a list of Golden Gate University people, including notable students, alumni, faculty, and administrators associated.

== Alumni ==
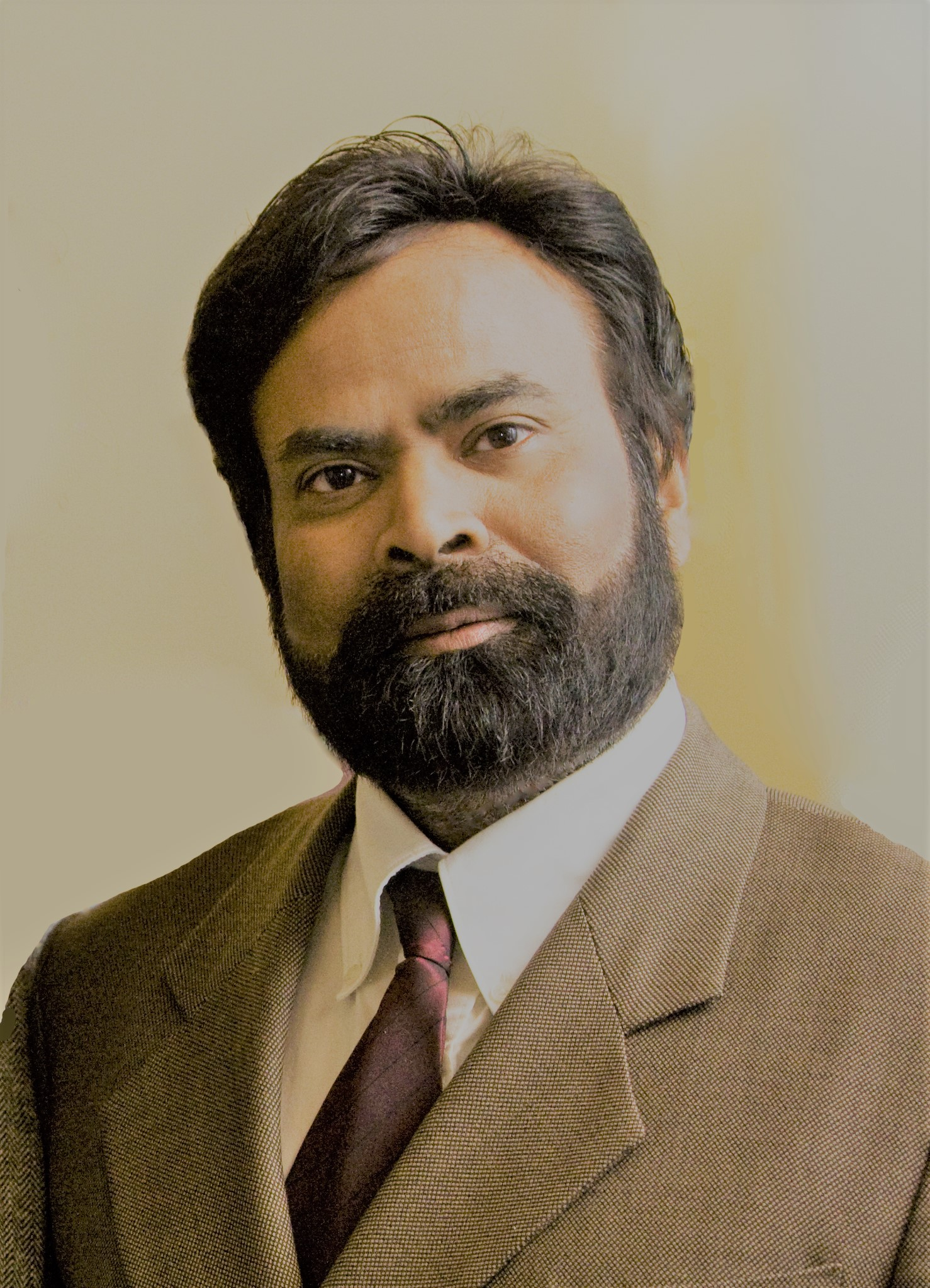
Solomon Darwin

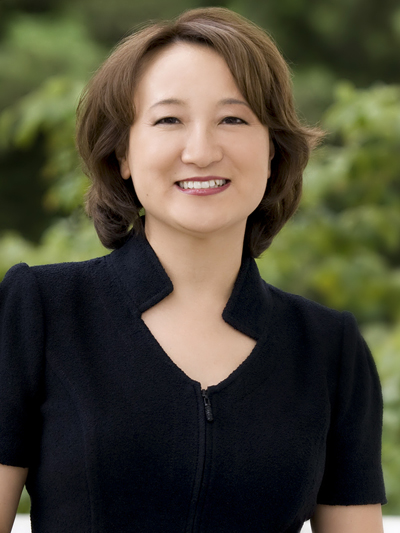
Mary Hayashi

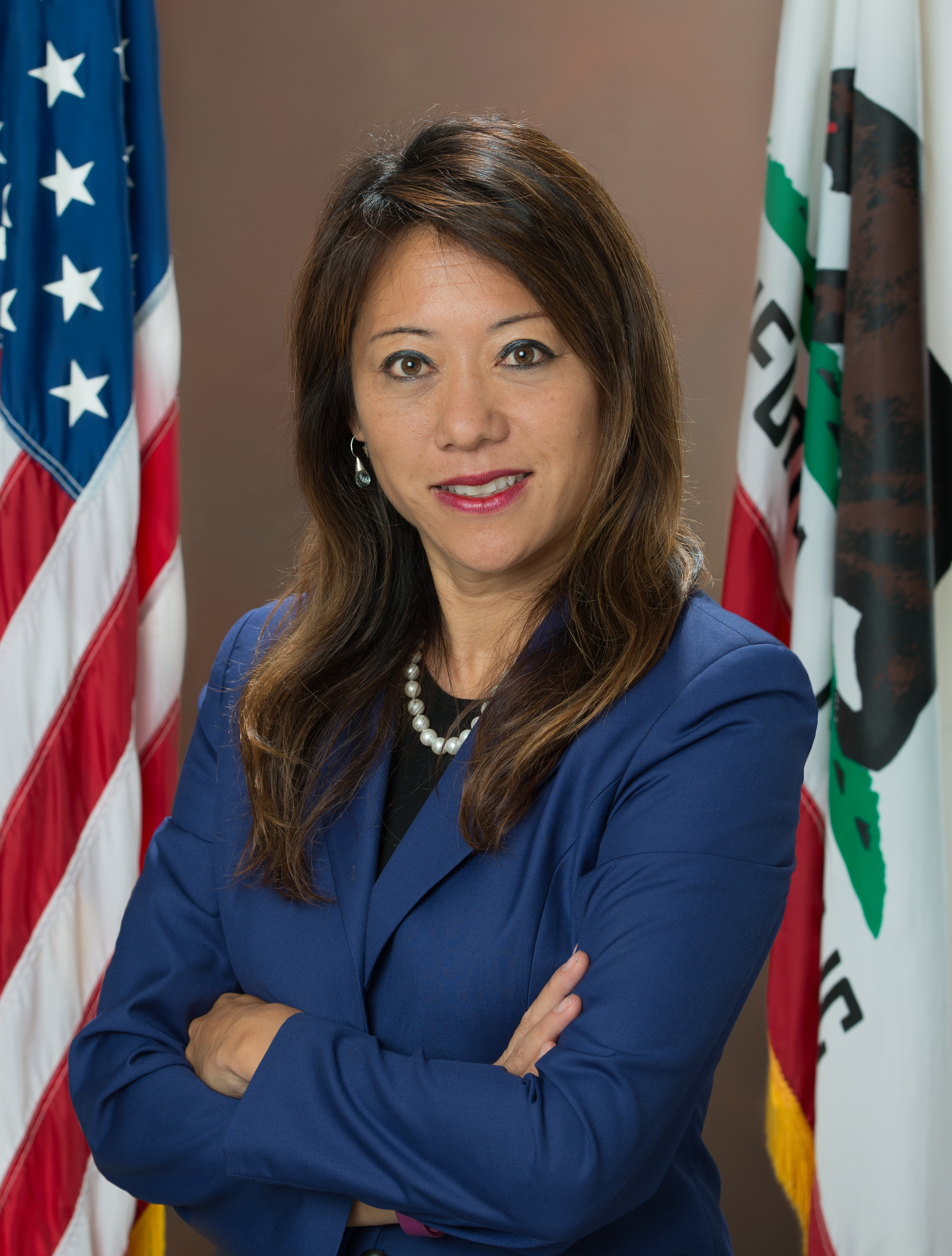
Fiona Ma

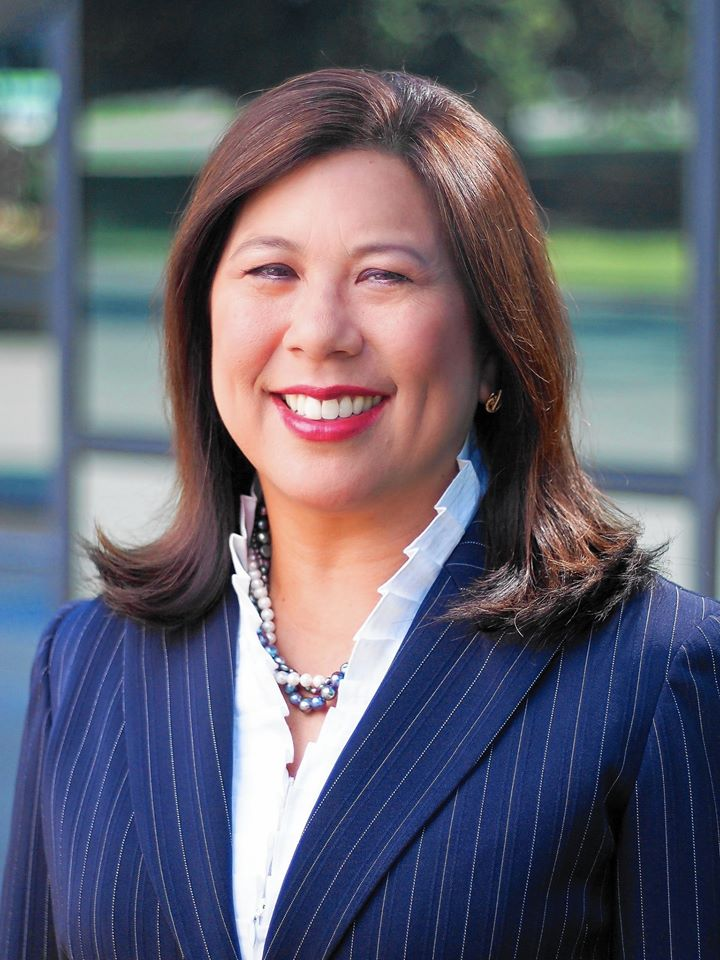
Betty Yee

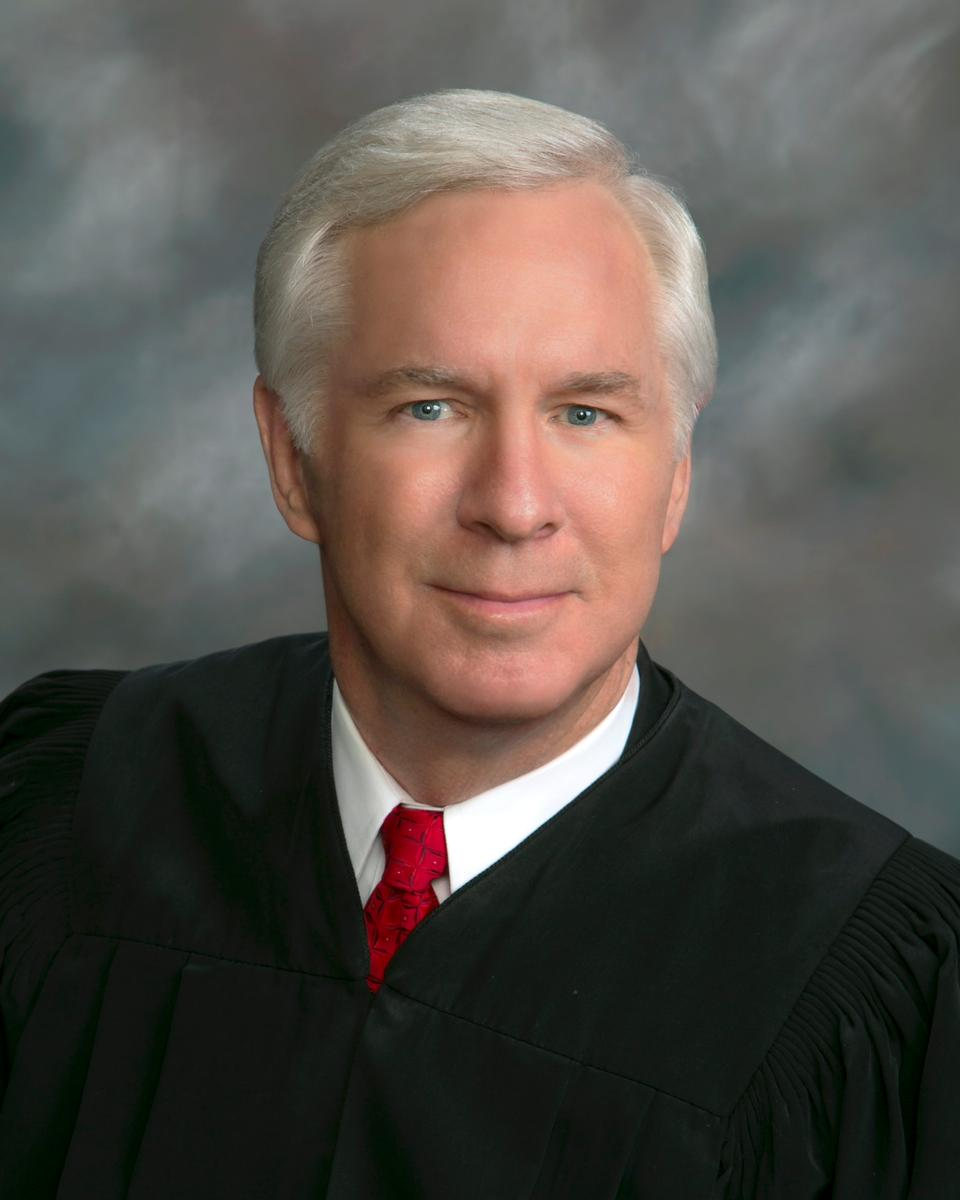
Lawrence Joseph O'Neill

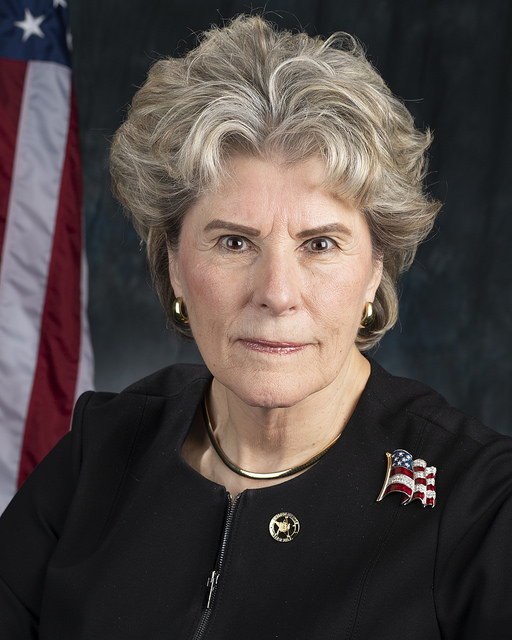
Susan Pamerleau

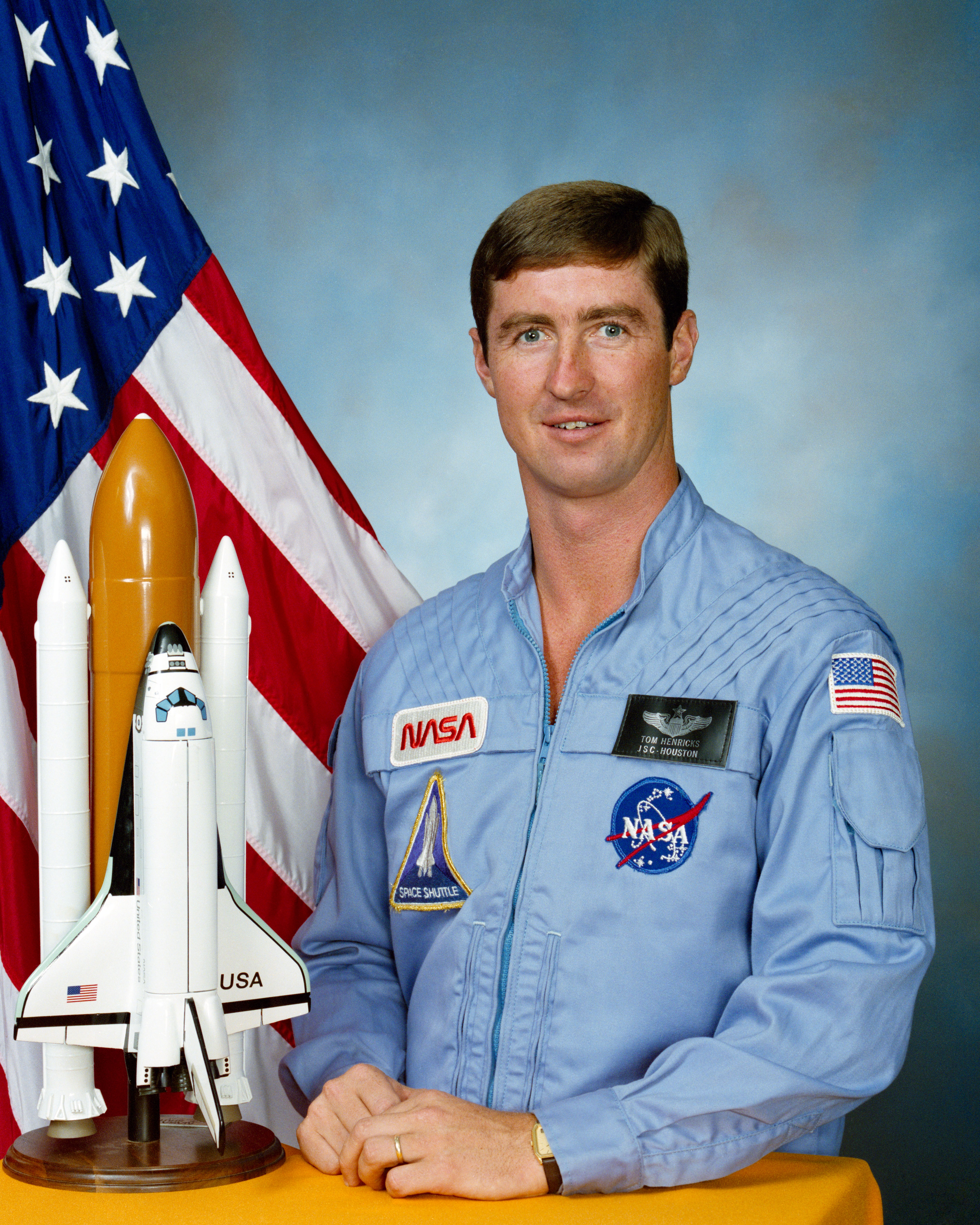
Terence T. Henricks

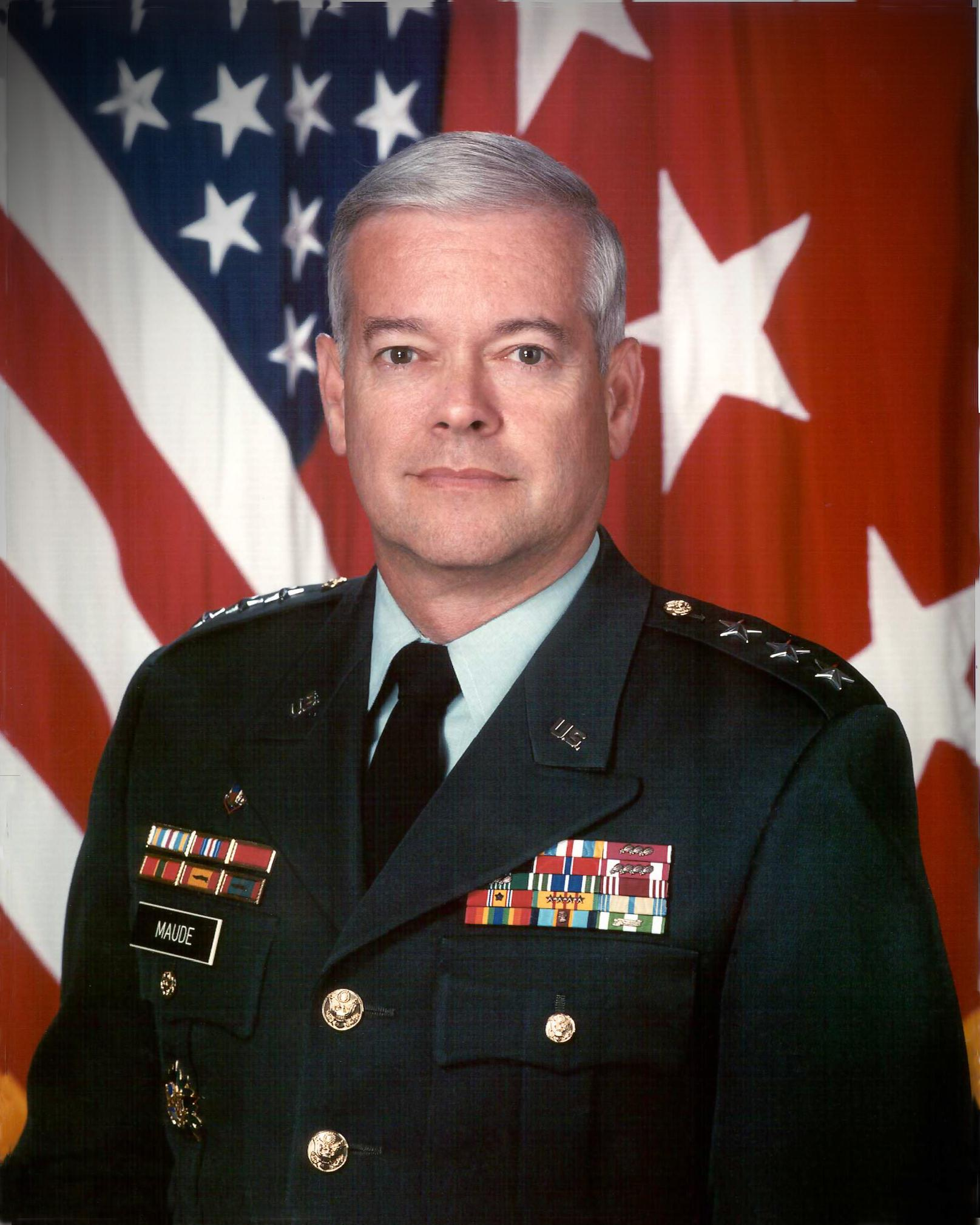
Timothy Maude

There are more than 60,000 living alumni. Alumni with a degree of Juris Doctor (JD) graduated from the Golden Gate University School of Law.

=== Academia ===
- Solomon Darwin (MBA), professor of business at the University of California, Berkeley

=== Arts and entertainment ===
- Denise Mobolaji Ajayi-Williams (MBA), novelist and children's comic writer
- Kyra Davis (BS), novelist; author of Just One Night series and Sophie Katz series
- Gary W. Goldstein (JD 1978), author, speaker, filmmaker, and producer of Pretty Woman
- Diane Murphy (MBA), former child actress, known for sharing the role of "Tabitha" in Bewitched
- Tess Uriza Holthe (BS 1996), novelist; author of When the Elephants Dance
- Emily Wu (MBA), writer; author of Feather in the Storm: A Childhood Lost in Chaos

=== Business ===
- Ralph Atkin (MBA), founder of SkyWest Airlines
- Sophia Bekele (MBA), founder of DotConnectAfrica, corporate executive, international entrepreneur
- Richard Belluzzo (BS 1975), former CEO of Quantum Corp; former president and COO of Microsoft
- Joan Blades (JD 1980), businessperson, author, and co-founder of MoveOn.org
- Pollyanna Chu (BA), CEO of the Kingston Financial Group
- Bruce Gilliat (BS), co-founder and former CEO of Alexa Internet
- John C. Martin (MBA), former CEO (1996–2016) and chairman (2016–18) of Gilead Sciences
- Monique Morrow (MS), former CTO of Cisco Systems (2012–16)
- Glen Schofield (MBA), co-founder and general manager of Sledgehammer Games
- William H. Swanson (MBA), former chairman and CEO of Raytheon Company (2004–14)
- Bernard Tyson (BS, MBA), former chairman and CEO of Kaiser Permanente (2012–19)
- Dave Yeske (DBA 2010), financial planner, researcher, and educator

=== Government and politics ===
- Sam Aanestad (MPA 1991), California state senator (2002–10); California State Assemblymember (1998–2002)
- Mark H. Berry (1984), Arkansas state representative
- David Briley (JD 1995), 8th mayor of Nashville, Tennessee (2018–19); vice mayor of Nashville (2015–18)
- Violeta Bulc (MSIT), European Commissioner for Transport (2014–19); Deputy Prime Minister of Slovenia (2014)
- Phillip Burton (LL.B. 1952), United States representative (1964–83); California State Assemblymember (1957–64)
- Craig E. Campbell (MPA 1981), 10th lt. governor of Alaska
- George Christopher (BA 1930), 34th mayor of San Francisco (1956–64)
- Cecilia Chung (BS), civil rights and LGBT rights activist
- Sam Clovis (MBA), White House Advisor to the United States Department of Agriculture (2017–18); national co-chair of Donald Trump's presidential campaign
- Peter Corroon (JD 1995), 2nd mayor of Salt Lake County, Utah (2004–13); chair of the Utah Democratic Party (2014–17)
- Dave Cox (MS 1983), California state senator (2004–10); California State Assemblymember (1998–2004)
- Gong Zheng (1987, attended), mayor of Shanghai (2020–present); governor of Shandong (2017–2020)
- Thom Goolsby (MBA), North Carolina state senator (2011–14)
- Mary Hayashi (MBA), California State Assemblymember (2006–12); first Korean-American woman to serve in the California State Legislature
- J. J. Jelincic (MBA), CalPERS board member (elected), former president of the California State Employees Association
- Ed Jew (MBA 1984), San Francisco supervisor (2006–07)
- Linda J. LeZotte (LL.M. 1983), director of the Santa Clara Valley Water District (2010–present); San Jose City Councilmember (1998–2006)
- Fiona Ma (MS 1993), California State Treasurer (2019–present); California Board of Equalization member (2015–19); California State Assemblymember (2006–12); San Francisco supervisor (2002–06)
- Melvin T. Mason (BA), civil rights activist and educator; 1984 presidential candidate of the Socialist Workers Party
- Ross Mirkarimi (MA), sheriff of San Francisco (2012–16); San Francisco supervisor (2005–12); co-founder of the Green Party of California
- Dick Muri (MPA 1988), Washington State representative (2013–19); Pierce County Councilmember (2003–12)
- Louis M. Pate Jr. (BS 1978, MBA 1980), North Carolina state senator (2011–19); North Carolina General Assemblymember (1995–96; 2003–08)
- Denise Phua (MBA), mayor of Central Singapore District (2014–present); Member of Singapore Parliament (2006–present)
- Joseph Pitre (MPA), New Hampshire representative (2010–present)
- Richard Rainey (MPA 1976), HUD Regional Administrator (2003–09); California state senator (1996–2000); California State Assemblymember (1992–96)
- Said Tayeb Jawad (EMBA 2001), Ambassador of Afghanistan to the United States (2003–2010); Ambassador of Afghanistan to the United Kingdom of Great Britain and Northern Ireland (2017–present)
- Betty Yee (MPA 1981), 32nd California State Controller (2015–present); California Board of Equalization member (2004–15)

=== Law and justice ===
- Diana Becton (JD 1985), district attorney of Contra Costa County (2017–present)
- John Burris (BA 1967), Oakland civil rights and police brutality attorney
- Jesse W. Carter (JD 1913), associate justice of the Supreme Court of California (1939–59); California state senator from the 5th district (1939–39)
- Morgan Christen (JD 1986), judge of the United States Court of Appeals for the Ninth Circuit (2012–present); Associate Justice of the Alaska Supreme Court (2009–12)
- Miguel S. Demapan (MBA 1983), 3rd chief justice of the Supreme Court of the Commonwealth of the Northern Mariana Islands (1999–2011)
- C. J. Goodell (LL.B. 1909), associate justice of the California Court of Appeal, First District (1945–1953)
- G. Randy Kasten (JD 1982), attorney and author
- George Malek-Yonan (1964, attended), international attorney, politician, and athlete
- Bruce William Nickerson (JD), civil rights and gay rights attorney
- Lawrence Joseph O'Neill (MPA 1976), judge of the United States District Court for the Eastern District of California (2007–present)
- Cindy Ossias (JD 1983), lawyer and California Department of Insurance whistleblower
- Susan Pamerleau (MPA 1978), United States marshal for the Western District of Texas (2018–present); sheriff of Bexar County, Texas (2013–16)
- Philip M. Pro (JD 1972), judge of the United States District Court for the District of Nevada (1987–2015)
- Ira P. Rothken (JD 1992), high technology attorney and computer scientist
- Prentice E. Sanders (BA 1975, MPA 1977), first African American chief of the San Francisco Police Department (2002–03)
- Mike Terrizzi (JD 1981), community association lawyer and former Purdue quarterback
- Hanna Thompson (JD 2013), attorney and 2008 Olympics silver-medalist fencer
- Paul Traub (JD 1977), bankruptcy and business lawyer

=== Military ===
- Andrew E. Busch (MPA 1981), director of the Defense Logistics Agency (2014–17); United States Air Force lieutenant general (ret.)
- Herbert J. Carlisle (MBA 1988), United States Air Force four-star general (ret.); former commander of Air Combat Command and Pacific Air Forces
- Julia Jeter Cleckley (MS 1985), United States Army National Guard brigadier general
- Bruce P. Crandall (MPA), United States Army lieutenant colonel (ret.); helicopter pilot, Battle of Ia Drang, Vietnam; Medal of Honor recipient
- Gregory A. Feest (MBA 1985), United States Air Force major general (ret.)
- Burton M. Field (MBA 1986), United States Air Force lieutenant general (ret.)
- Fitzhugh L. Fulton (BA), test pilot at NASA's Dryden Flight Research Center; United States Air Force lieutenant colonel (ret.)
- Terry Gabreski (MPA 1978), United States Air Force lieutenant general (ret.)
- Terence T. Henricks (MPA 1982), test pilot and commander of the Space Shuttle Columbia; United States Air Force colonel (ret.)
- John P. Jumper (MBA 1979), 17th chief of staff of the United States Air Force (2001–2005); United States Air Force four-star general (ret.); former CEO of SAIC
- Thaddeus J. Martin (MPA 1985), adjutant general of the Connecticut National Guard (2005–18); United States Air Force major general (ret.)
- Timothy Maude (BA), United States Army deputy chief of staff for personnel killed in the September 11 attacks; United States Army lieutenant general
- Frank C. McConnell (BBA 1960), US Army brigadier general
- Gary L. North (MPA 1984), United States Air Force four-star general (ret.); former commander of Pacific Air Forces
- Bobby V. Page (MPA 1978), deputy chief of chaplains of the United States Air Force (2012–16); United States Air Force brigadier general (ret.)
- J. Gregory Pavlovich (MPA 1985), United States Air Force brigadier general (ret.); former commander of 45th Space Wing
- Charles J. Precourt (MS 1988), NASA astronaut; Space Shuttle pilot and commander; United States Air Force colonel (ret.)
- John W. Rosa (MPA 1985), 16th Superintendent of the United States Air Force Academy (2003–05); United States Air Force lieutenant general (ret.)
- Herbert R. Temple Jr. (BS 1974), chief of the National Guard Bureau (1986–90); United States Army lieutenant general (ret.)
- Lam Quang Thi (MBA), Army of the Republic of Vietnam Lieutenant General

=== Science and technology ===
- Cem Kaner (JD 1994), software engineering professor; co-founder of Association for Software Testing
- Edward J. Wasp (MBA), engineer and inventor who developed long distance slurry pipelines

== Faculty ==
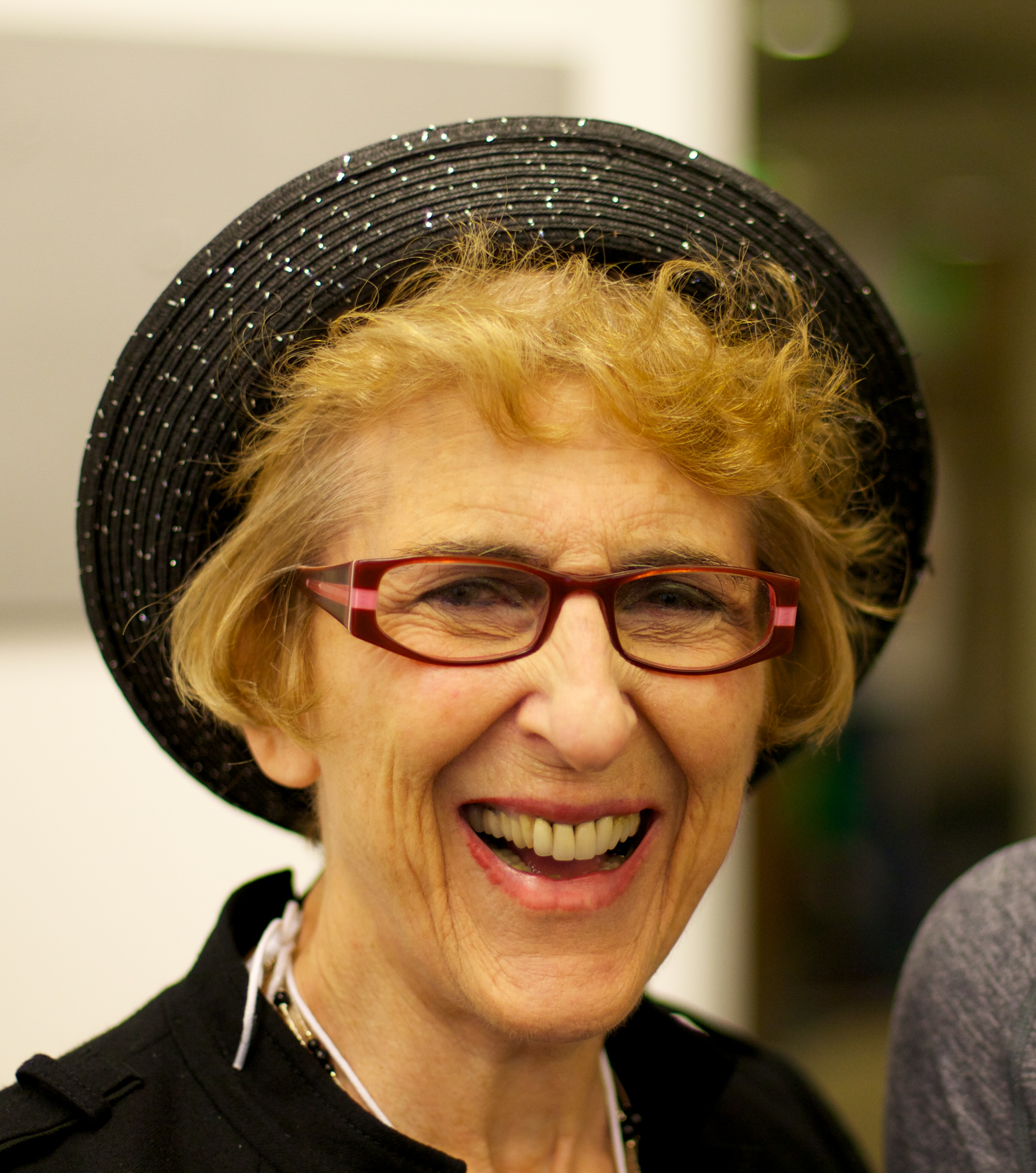
Carol Ruth Silver

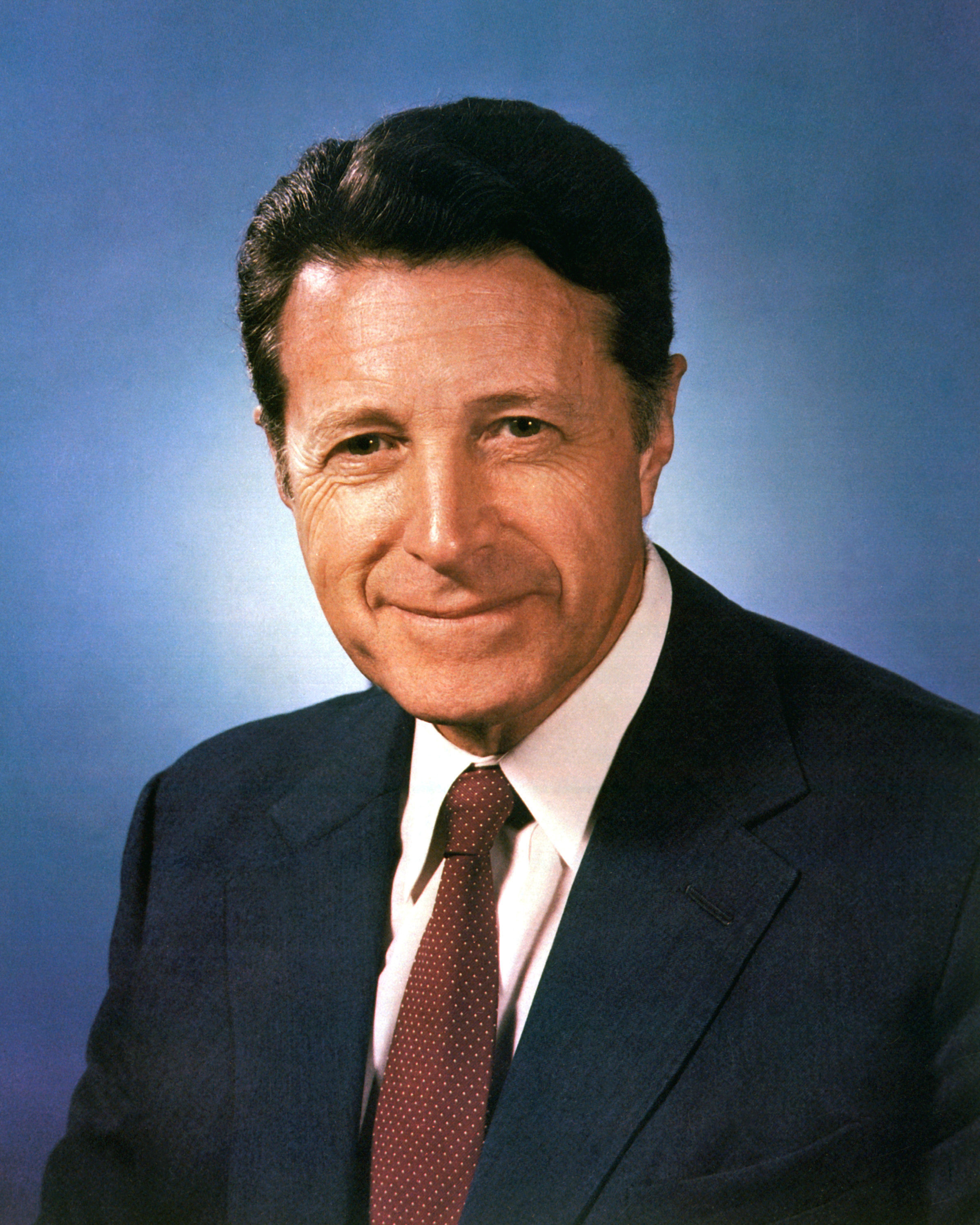
Caspar Weinberger

Faculty who were also alumni are listed in bold font, with degree and year in parentheses.

- Dan Angel, president of Golden Gate University (2007–15); member of the Michigan House of Representatives from the 49th district (1973–1978)
- Rebecca Bauer-Kahan, California State Assemblymember from the 16th district (2018–present); former law school professor
- Colin Crawford, 16th dean of Golden Gate University School of Law (2021–present)
- George N. Crocker, dean of Golden Gate University School of Law (1934–41)
- Thelton Henderson, judge of the United States District Court for the Northern District of California (1980–present; inactive); associate law professor (1978–80)
- Gerald Sanford Levin, judge of the United States District Court for the Northern District of California (1969–71) and San Francisco County Superior Court, law school instructor
- Andrew McClurg, law professor and legal humorist
- Shannon Minter, civil rights attorney and legal director of the National Center for Lesbian Rights
- Anthony Niedwiecki, dean of Golden Gate University School of Law (2017–2020), former vice mayor of Oakland Park, FL, co-founder of Fight OUT Loud
- Riall Nolan, anthropologist and dean of International Affairs and Programs at Golden Gate University (1995–98)
- Cecil F. Poole, judge of the United States Court of Appeals for the Ninth Circuit (1979–97) and United States District Court for the Northern District of California (1976–80), United States Attorney for the Northern District of California (1961–70), law school instructor
- Renny Pritikin, chief curator of Contemporary Jewish Museum; art administration instructor
- Carol Ruth Silver, member of the San Francisco Board of Supervisors (1978–89); Freedom Riders and civil liberties activist; law school professor
- Lidia S. Stiglich, associate justice of the Nevada Supreme Court (2016–present); adjunct law professor
- Caspar Weinberger, 15th United States Secretary of Defense (1981–87), 10th United States Secretary of Health and Human Services (1973–75), law school instructor
- Henry Travillion Wingate, judge of the United States District Court for the Southern District of Mississippi (1985–2010), adjunct law school instructor (1975–76)
- Dave Yeske (DBA 2010), financial planner, Distinguished Adjunct Professor at the Ageno School of Business

== Presidents ==
Prior to 1948, the top executive was called the educational director.

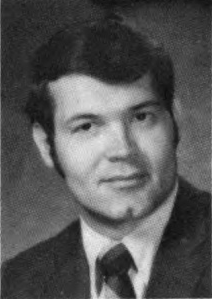
Dan Angel

No.	Name	Term
1.	Arthur A. Macurda	1901–1914
2.	Archie R. Mack	1914–1931
3.	Nagel T. Miner	1931–1958
4.	Russell T. Sharpe	1958–1970
5.	Otto W. Butz	1970–1992
6.	Thomas M. Stauffer	1992–1999
7.	Philip Friedman	1999–2007
8.	Dan Angel	2007–2015
9.	David J. Fike	2015–2025
