= Bruce P. Crandall =

United States Army Medal of Honor recipient (1933–2026)

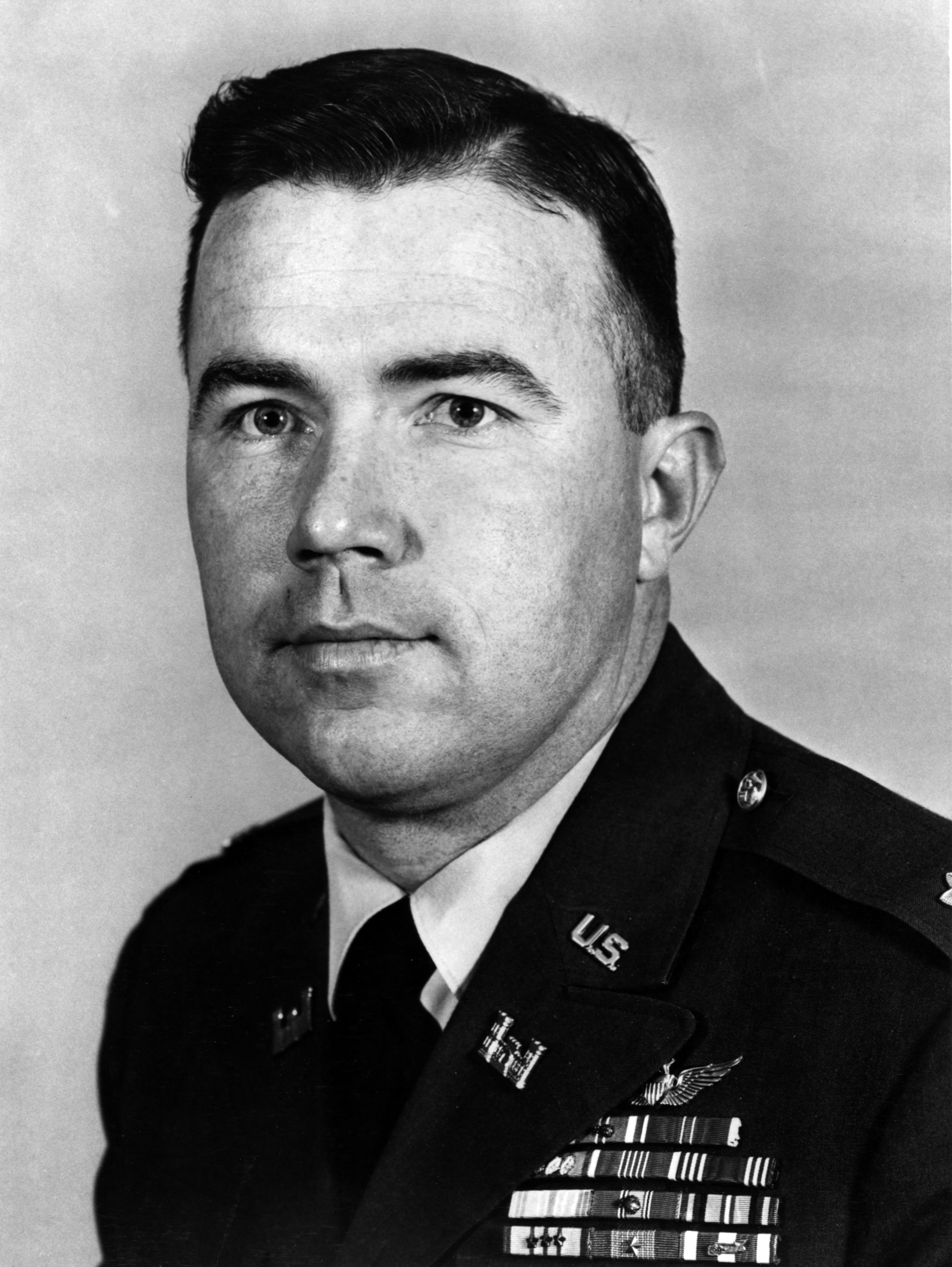
- Crandall in the mid-1960s
- Born: February 17, 1933; Olympia, Washington, U.S.
- Died: May 31, 2026 (aged 93); Tempe, Arizona, U.S.
- Spouse: Arlene Shaffer (m. 1956; died 2010)
- Children: 3
- Military career
- Allegiance: United States
- Branch: United States Army
- Service years: 1953–1977
- Rank: Colonel
- Nicknames: "Snake", "Snakeshit"
- Conflicts: Operation Power Pack; Vietnam War: Battle of Ia Drang
- Awards: Medal of Honor; Distinguished Flying Cross (4); Bronze Star Medal; Purple Heart; Meritorious Service Medal (3); Air Medal (23)
- Other work: City Manager of Dunsmuir, California; Public Works Manager of Mesa, Arizona

Bruce Perry Crandall (February 17, 1933 – May 31, 2026) was a United States Army officer who received the Medal of Honor for his actions as a pilot during the Battle of Ia Drang on November 14, 1965, in South Vietnam. During the battle, he flew 22 missions in a Bell Huey helicopter into enemy fire to evacuate more than 70 wounded and bring ammunition and supplies to United States forces. His actions in the battle of the Ia Drang valley were portrayed by actor Greg Kinnear in the Mel Gibson film, We Were Soldiers. By the end of the Vietnam War, he had flown more than 900 combat missions. He retired from the army as a lieutenant colonel and worked several jobs in different states before settling down with his wife in his home state of Washington.

== Background ==
Crandall was born on February 17, 1933, in Olympia, Washington, where he was also raised. He attended public schools and became an All-American baseball player in high school. He attended the University of Washington in Seattle until being drafted into the United States Army in 1953 during the Korean War.

He married Arlene Shaffer on March 31, 1956, and they had three sons and five grandchildren. Arlene died from cancer on November 2, 2010. Crandall died at his residence in Tempe, Arizona, on May 31, 2026, at the age of 93.

== Military career ==
Crandall graduated from Engineer Officer Candidate School, Fort Belvoir, Virginia, in 1954. He was sent to fixed-wing and helicopter training conducted by the air force and army, then he was assigned to an Army Aviation mapping group headquartered at the Presidio of San Francisco. It was then "the largest flying military aviation unit in the world". He began to pilot Cessna L-19 Bird Dogs and de Havilland Canada DHC-2 Beavers in Alaska for military topographic studies. His first overseas flying assignment was to Wheelus Air Base in Tripoli, Libya. There he mapped the desert for two years, flying de Havilland Canada DHC-3 Otter, DHC-2 Beaver, L-19 Birddog, and OH-23 Raven aircraft as an instructor pilot and unit test pilot.

Crandall's next overseas tours were flying over thousands of square miles of previously unmapped mountains and jungles in Central and South America. For this mission, he was based at Howard Air Force Base, Panama, and Costa Rica. He helped to develop air-assault tactics as a platoon leader while assigned to the 11th Air Assault Division. In early 1965, he joined the Dominican Republic Expeditionary Force as a liaison to the XVIII Airborne Corps. Later that year, he was assigned to South Vietnam, where the United States had entered the civil war defending South Vietnam against the Communist North Vietnamese. He commanded the 1st Cavalry Division's Company A, 229th Assault Helicopter Battalion at Camp Radcliff, An Khe, Vietnam. He led a flying unit supporting eight battalions on the ground, using the call sign "Ancient Serpent 6".

=== Battle of Ia Drang ===
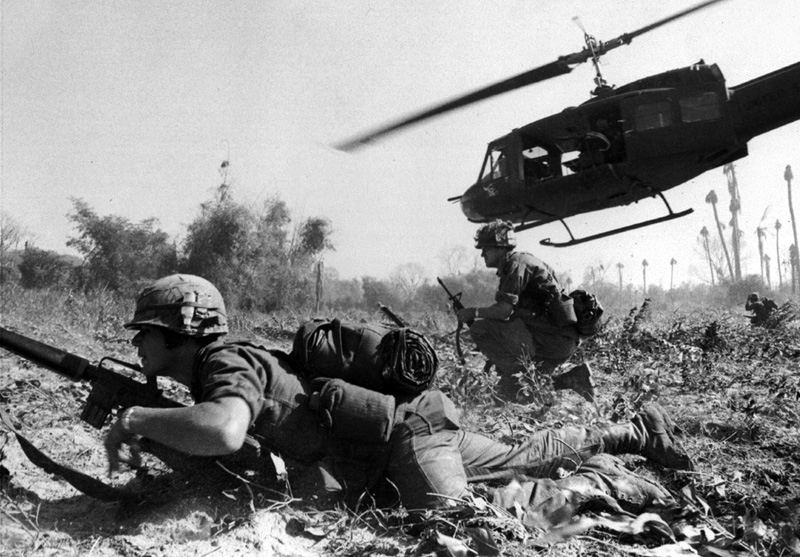
Crandall's UH-1 Huey dispatching infantry in the Ia Drang operation

On November 14, 1965, Crandall led the first major division operation of the Vietnam War, landing elements of the 1st Battalion and 2nd Battalion of the 7th Cavalry Regiment and the 5th Cavalry Regiment into Landing Zone X-Ray in the Battle of Ia Drang. During the fierce battle that followed, he was credited with evacuating some 70 wounded soldiers, along with his wing man Major Ed Freeman. Twelve of these fourteen flights (another source reports 18) were made after the Medevac unit refused to land in the landing zone which was under intense fire. Crandall evacuated more than 75 casualties in his helicopters, during a flight day that started at 6 am and ended at 10:30 pm, more than 16 hours later. "It was the longest day I ever experienced in any aircraft," he said. He had to use several helicopters throughout the day because each aircraft became badly damaged.

Crandall and Freeman were also credited with flying in the ammunition needed for the 7th Cavalry to survive. The craft that he was flying was unarmed. He was initially awarded the Distinguished Service Cross, but this was upgraded to the Medal of Honor, awarded by President George W. Bush in a ceremony in the East Room of the White House on February 26, 2007.

=== Operation Masher ===
Crandall had just finished a full day supporting the 12th Infantry Battalion on January 31, 1966, during the first combined American and Army of the Republic of Vietnam operation called "Operation Masher". He returned to refuel and shut down for the night when he learned that a company was in heavy enemy contact and had 12 wounded soldiers who needed evacuation. The soldiers were pinned down in a tight perimeter. The unit was led by Captain Tony Nadal, his friend and fellow veteran of the Battle of la Drang.

Crandall refueled and flew to the area. He learned that the pick-up zone was surrounded by trees on three sides, and he was told that the Medevac had refused to land there. To minimize the chances of hitting the trees, he decided to descend vertically. The night was pitch dark with an overcast sky, making flying extremely difficult. He wanted to avoid giving the enemy an illuminated target and risk back-lighting the soldiers defending the landing zone and the wounded soldiers. Instead of using search or landing lights, he instructed Nadal to point a flashlight up in the center of the touchdown area. He landed twice under intense enemy fire and successfully evacuated all 12 wounded soldiers.

=== Later service ===
After an assignment in Colorado, Crandall attended the Armed Forces Staff College. Soon he was back in South Vietnam, this time flying UH-1 Huey gunships and supporting the 1st Battalion, 9th Cavalry Squadron, 1st Cavalry Division.

Crandall's helicopter was shot down during another rescue attempt in January 1968, four months into his second tour, due to air force bombs going off too close to where he was flying. He spent five months in the hospital recovering from a broken back and other injuries, then resumed his career as a student at the University of Nebraska, graduating in 1969. He became a facility engineer assigned to Bangkok, Thailand where he managed 3,800 people. He subsequently served as deputy chief of staff, deputy installation commander, and commander of the 5th Engineer Combat Battalion, all at Fort Leonard Wood, Missouri.

South America was to be his next assignment, and he and his wife Arlene attended the Defense Language Institute in Monterey, California, as Spanish-language students in preparation. He was to be aviation and engineering adviser to Argentina, but the assignment did not take place as Crandall suffered a stroke which ended his flying career. After his recovery, the Crandalls found the language training useful when he was sent to Caracas, Venezuela, as the Defense Mapping Agency's director for the Inter-American Geodetic Survey. In his final army assignment, he served as senior engineer adviser to the California Army National Guard. In 1977, he retired from the army as a lieutenant colonel.

== Later life ==
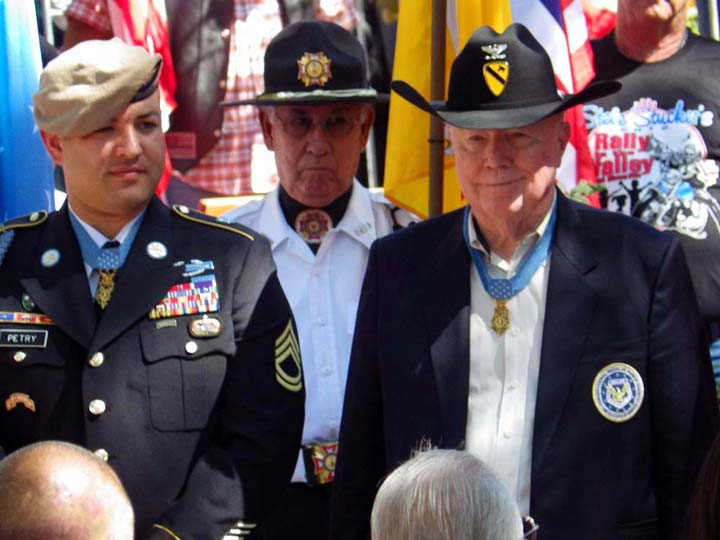
Crandall (right) and Medal of Honor recipient Leroy Petry (left) in Santa Fe, New Mexico, June 24, 2013

After retiring from the army, Crandall earned a master's degree in public administration from Golden Gate University in 1977. He then worked in public service jobs, including three years as the city manager of Dunsmuir, California. After leaving California, he and his wife Arlene Louise Shaffer moved to Mesa, Arizona, where he worked for 17 years in the Public Works Department, the last four as the public works manager. His wife died on November 2, 2010, and is buried at Arlington National Cemetery.

Crandall was promoted to colonel on April 15, 2010, more than 30 years after retiring from the army, in recognition of his accomplishments and receiving the Medal of Honor. The ceremony was held at the Army Aviation Association Convention in Fort Worth, Texas. He attended the June 24, 2013 unveiling of Medal of Honor recipient Leroy Petry's statue in Santa Fe, New Mexico. He raised the "12th Man" flag for the Seattle Seahawks – Minnesota Vikings football game on November 17, 2013, as part of the Seahawks "Salute to Service".

He died in his sleep at his residence in Tempe, Arizona on May 31, 2026.

== Awards and decorations ==
Crandall received the following military decorations:

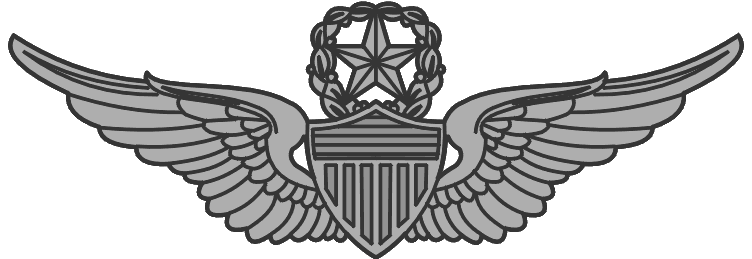

Master Army Aviator Badge
Medal of Honor	Distinguished Service Cross (Army)	Distinguished Flying Cross w/ 3 bronze oak leaf clusters
Bronze Star Medal	Purple Heart	Meritorious Service Medal w/ 2 bronze oak leaf clusters
Air Medal w/ award numeral 23	Army Commendation Medal	Army Good Conduct Medal
National Defense Service Medal w/ 1 bronze service star	Armed Forces Expeditionary Medal	Vietnam Service Medal w/ 4 bronze campaign stars
Armed Forces Reserve Medal	Vietnam Cross of Gallantry w/ Palm and 3 Gold Stars	Republic of Vietnam Campaign Medal

Army Presidential Unit Citation		Valorous Unit Award
Meritorious Unit Commendation	Vietnam Gallantry Cross Unit Citation	Vietnam Civil Actions Unit Citation

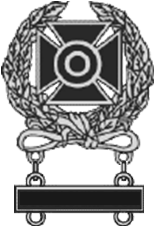

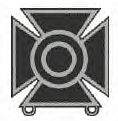

Army Expert Marksmanship Badge	Army Sharpshooter Badge

=== Medal of Honor citation ===
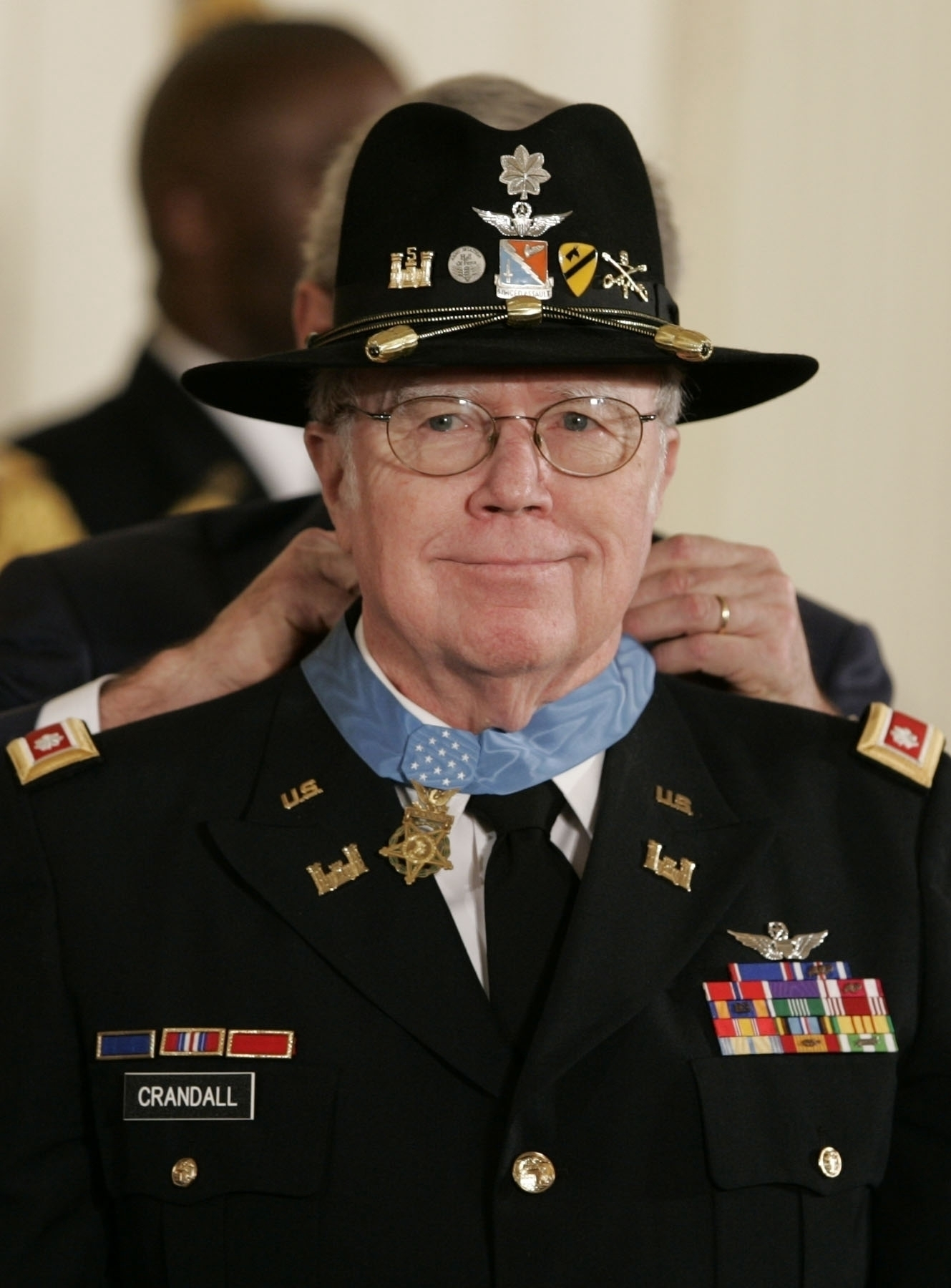
Bruce Crandall receiving the Medal of Honor

On February 26, 2007, Crandall was awarded the Medal of Honor by President George Bush for his actions at the Battle of la Drang.

For conspicuous gallantry and intrepidity at the risk of his life above and beyond the call of duty: Major Bruce P. Crandall distinguished himself by extraordinary heroism as a Flight Commander in the Republic of Vietnam, while serving with Company A, 229th Assault Helicopter Battalion, 1st Cavalry Division (Airmobile). On 14 November 1965, his flight of sixteen helicopters was lifting troops for a search and destroy mission from Plei Me, Vietnam, to Landing Zone X-Ray in the Ia Drang Valley. On the fourth troop lift, the airlift began to take enemy fire, and by the time the aircraft had refueled and returned for the next troop lift, the enemy had Landing Zone X-Ray targeted. As Major Crandall and the first eight helicopters landed to discharge troops on his fifth troop lift, his unarmed helicopter came under such intense enemy fire that the ground commander ordered the second flight of eight aircraft to abort their mission. As Major Crandall flew back to Plei Me, his base of operations, he determined that the ground commander of the besieged infantry battalion desperately needed more ammunition. Major Crandall then decided to adjust his base of operations to Artillery Firebase Falcon in order to shorten the flight distance to deliver ammunition and evacuate wounded soldiers. While medical evacuation was not his mission, he immediately sought volunteers and with complete disregard for his own personal safety, led the two aircraft to Landing Zone X-Ray. Despite the fact that the landing zone was still under relentless enemy fire, Major Crandall landed and proceeded to supervise the loading of seriously wounded soldiers aboard his aircraft. Major Crandall's voluntary decision to land under the most extreme fire instilled in the other pilots the will and spirit to continue to land their own aircraft, and in the ground forces the realization that they would be resupplied and that friendly wounded would be promptly evacuated. This greatly enhanced morale and the will to fight at a critical time. After his first medical evacuation, Major Crandall continued to fly into and out of the landing zone throughout the day and into the evening. That day he completed a total of 22 flights, most under intense enemy fire, retiring from the battlefield only after all possible service had been rendered to the Infantry battalion. His actions provided critical resupply of ammunition and evacuation of the wounded. Major Crandall's daring acts of bravery and courage in the face of an overwhelming and determined enemy are in keeping with the highest traditions of the military service and reflect great credit upon himself, his unit, and the United States Army.

=== Other honors ===
Crandall was inducted into the United States Air Force's "Gathering of Eagles" in 1994, one of only seven Army aviators so honored, and the Army Aviation Hall of Fame in 2004.

For his courage during Operation Masher, Crandall received the Aviation & Space Writers Helicopter Heroism Award for 1966. At the 20th annual award ceremony, his rescue flights were ranked highest over the first 20 years of the award.

The Olympia High School Baseball Field was named after Lt. Col. Crandall in a ceremony during the 2003 season. Crandall was a High School All-American baseball player for Olympia High School.

Crandall served as the honorary starter for the 2011 Indianapolis 500.

On April 15, 2011, Crandall was inducted as an honorary member of 1st Squadron, 6th Cavalry Regiment. Col. Crandall signed the Squadron rolls during a Squadron Ball where he helped induct officers and NCO's into the Order of St. Michael and received a 1st Sqdn., 6th Cav. Regt. belt buckle. 1–6 CAV recently returned from a successful deployment to support Operation Iraqi Freedom and Operation New Dawn.

Crandall's exploits (along with those of many others) at the Battle of Ia Drang, are depicted in the 1992 book We Were Soldiers Once...And Young (by Harold G. Moore and Joseph L. Galloway), and in the related 2002 movie, We Were Soldiers, where he is portrayed by Greg Kinnear. Crandall served as an aviation consultant during filming in 2001.

=== University of Washington Medal of Honor Memorial ===
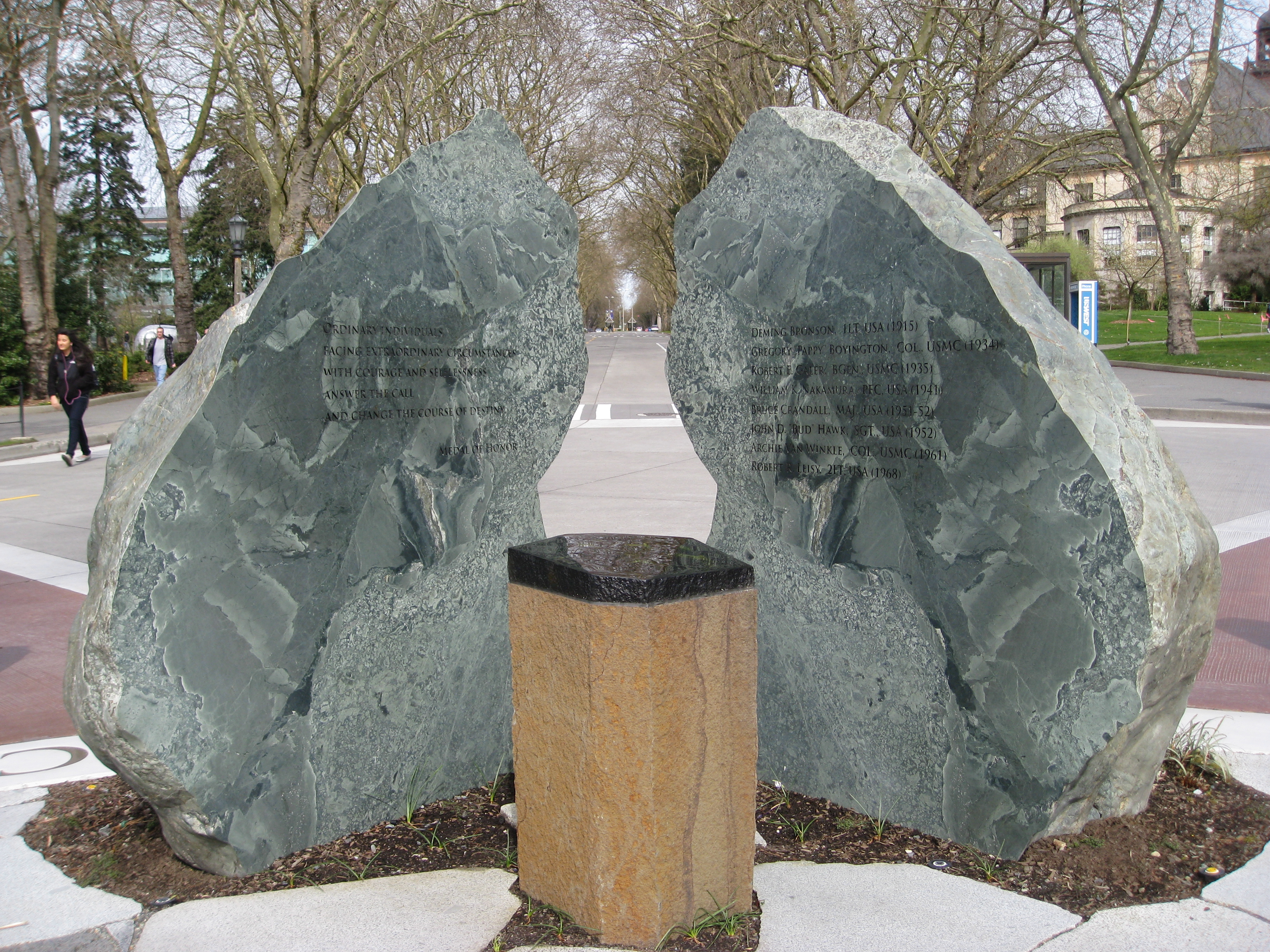
Medal of Honor memorial at the University of Washington

The University of Washington Medal of Honor memorial was constructed at the south end of Memorial Way (17th Ave NE), north of Red Square, in the interior of a traffic circle between Parrington and Kane Halls (47.6573°N 122.3097°W). It was privately funded and was completed in time for a Veterans Day dedication in November 2009. It honors alumni Greg Boyington, Deming Bronson, Bruce Crandall, Robert E. Galer, John D. Hawk, Robert Leisy, William Kenzo Nakamura, and Archie Van Winkle.

== See also ==
- List of Medal of Honor recipients for the Vietnam War
- List of University of Washington people
- List of Golden Gate University people
