= Dave Yeske =

American financial planner

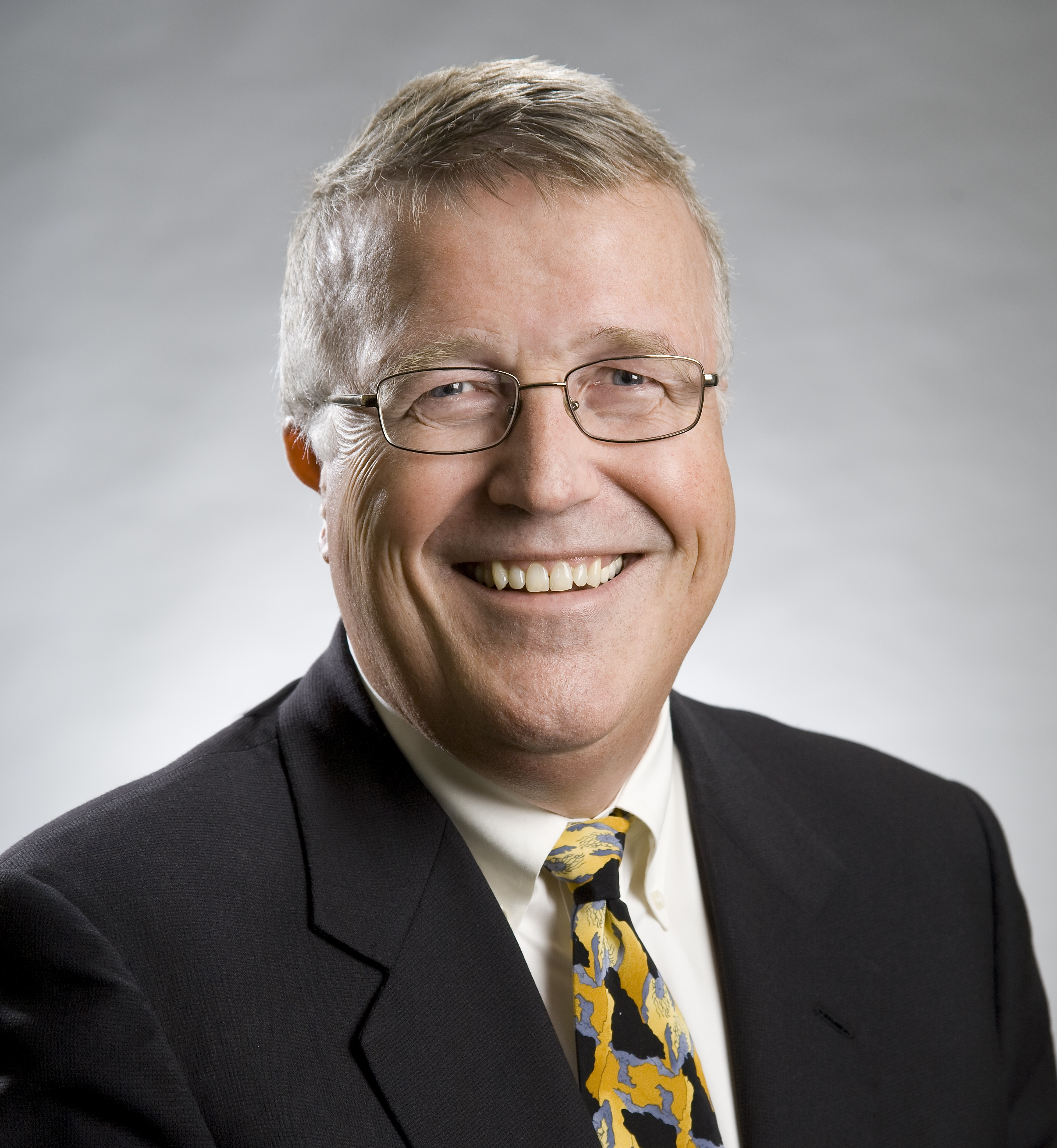
- Born: David Brent Yeske; Albany, California, US
- Education: University of San Francisco; Golden Gate University
- Occupations: Co-founder, Managing Director, Yeske Buie; Distinguished Adjunct Professor, Golden Gate University; Past-President and Chair; Financial Planning Association

Dave Yeske is an American financial planner, researcher, and educator. He is particularly known for his research and writing in the areas of Policy-Based Financial Planning and Strategy-Making by financial planners. Yeske is co-founder and a managing director of Yeske Buie, a wealth management firm; a past national president of the Financial Planning Association; and currently holds an appointment as Distinguished Adjunct Professor in Golden Gate University's Ageno School of Business where he served as director of the school's financial planning degree program from 2014 to 2023.

== Career ==
Yeske earned a B.S. in applied economics and an M.A. in economics from the University of San Francisco, as well as a Doctor of Business Administration (DBA) degree from Golden Gate University. A summary of the findings from his doctoral dissertation, "Finding the Planning in Financial Planning: An Integrative Framework for Strategy Making by Financial Planners," was published in the Journal of Financial Planning in September, 2010. Yeske is a Certified Financial Planner professional. After stints on the options trading floor of the Pacific Exchange and with The Paul Revere Insurance Group (now part of Unum), Yeske founded Yeske & Company on May 1, 1990. Yeske & Company subsequently merged with Financial Planning Group to form Yeske Buie on January 1, 2008.

Dr. Yeske founded the San Francisco Society of the Institute of Certified Financial Planners (ICFP) in 1993 and subsequently served on the ICFP's national board of directors beginning in 1997. The ICFP was a predecessor of the Financial Planning Association (FPA), which came into existence on January 1, 2000 as a result of the merger of the ICFP and the International Association for Financial Planning (IAFP). Yeske served as president of the FPA in 2003 and chair in 2004. During his presidency, the FPA spun off its Broker-Dealer Division in order to focus more exclusively on its mission to "be the community that fosters the value of financial planning and advances the financial planning profession." Yeske also focused on promulgating a fiduciary standard for financial planners, making it the centerpiece of his speech before members at the FPA annual conference in Philadelphia in 2003. After retiring from the FPA board, Yeske served two terms as chair of the FPA's political action committee in 2005 and 2006. Dr. Yeske chaired the FPA Research Center Team from 2008 to 2010 and chaired FPA's Academic Advisory Council in 2011 and 2012. He represented FPA on the US Technical Advisory Group (TAG) for the International Organization for Standardization (ISO) standard for financial planning, ISO 22222 from 2008 to 2011. Yeske began a three-year term as Practitioner Editor of the Journal of Financial Planning on June 1, 2015.

On January 1, 2024, Dr. Yeske began a one year term as Chair of the Foundation for Financial Planning's board of trustees.

Yeske was named a "Mover and Shaker" in 2005 by Financial Planning Magazine, his investment approach was profiled in the Wall Street Journal in 2009, and he was profiled again by the Journal in 2010 on the "Science of Financial Advising." In October 2012, Yeske was recognized by the Financial Planning Association with the Heart of Financial Planning Award, granted to those individuals "who engage in extraordinary work, contributing and giving back to the financial planning community and public through financial planning." In granting the award, FPA highlighted Yeske's role as an educator, saying "his knowledge and teaching spans a generation of planners who have used his instruction and mentoring to polish their technical expertise." In 2017, the Financial Planning Association honored Yeske with the P. Kemp Fain, Jr. Award, the association's lifetime achievement award.

== Policy-Based Financial Planning ==
Taking a concept first proposed by Hallman and Rosenbloom, Yeske and Elissa Buie developed and expanded the concept of Policy-Based Financial Planning. Their article, "Policy-Based Financial Planning Provides Touchstone in a Turbulent World," was published in the Journal of Financial Planning in July 2006. Buie and Yeske subsequently presented the concept at conferences around the world, including two national FPA conferences in the U.S. and conferences in London, Edinburgh, and Manchester. Financial planning policies are compact statements combining client values and objectives with financial planning best practices to form compact decision rules. These decision rules facilitate rapid decision making in the face of changing external circumstances. A good policy is one that is at once broad enough to encompass any novel event and specific enough to always return a clear answer or action. Examples of such financial planning policies include the safe-withdrawal spending rules developed by Guyton and Klinger, investment policies as described by Boone and Lubitz, and policies for managing debt, charitable-giving, or risk management.

== Financial Planning Strategy Modes (FPSM) Model ==
As part of his doctoral research, Yeske developed a model for explaining the strategy-making activities of financial planners and relating those activities to measures of client trust and relationship commitment. Since financial planning outcomes are difficult to directly observe and assess (i.e. financial planning possesses "high credence" characteristics), secondary measures like trust and commitment have been shown to be effective proxies. Yeske adapted a model first developed by Hart and Banbury for explaining the strategy-making activities of companies and applied it to the activities of financial planners. The model posits five modes of strategy-making that fall along the dimension of relative involvement by the planner and the client in the planning process. Moving from those approaches that are dominated by the planner to those dominated by the client, the five modes consist of the following: Planner-Driven, Data-Driven, Policy-Driven, Relationship-Driven, and Client-Driven. The model was empirically-validated by testing it against measures of client trust and commitment as conceptualized by Morgan and Hunt, Christiansen and DeVaney, Sharma and Patterson, and Sharpe et al. Among other findings, the three central modes - Data-Driven, Policy-Driven, and Relationship-Driven - were found to be the most powerful predictors of client trust and commitment. Of the three, the Policy-Driven mode had the most explanatory power, adding empirical support to prior work suggesting that Policy-Based Financial Planning is the most effective way to engage clients. The model also provides a framework for assessing planner competency in terms of the appropriate balance of knowledge/skills across the three main strategy-modes. Competency in all three modes is required to effectively facilitate client adjustment to the various types of change they encounter (environmental, volitional, and life-cycle). While the Certified Financial Planner list of 96 topics is purely descriptive and captures what planners are actually doing, the Yeske model offers a prescriptive approach that is empirically-derived from client trust and commitment.

== Publications ==
- Yeske, David B. and Buie, Elissa, “Policy-Based Financial Planning Provides Touchstone in a Turbulent World.” Journal of Financial Planning, 2006 http://ssrn.com/abstract=1624303
- Yeske, David B., “Finding the Planning in Financial Planning: An Integrative Framework for Strategy-Making by Financial Planners.” Golden Gate University, 2010 http://ssrn.com/abstract=1601327
- Yeske, David B., “Finding the Planning in Financial Planning." Journal of Financial Planning, 2010 http://ssrn.com/abstract=1612507
- Buie, Elissa and Yeske, Dave, “Evidence-Based Financial Planning: To Learn . . . Like a CFP.” Journal of Financial Planning, November, 2011 http://ssrn.com/abstract=1881346
- Yeske contributed 13 chapters to the Certified Financial Planner Board of Standards' "Financial Planning Competency Handbook," John Wiley & Sons, April 1, 2013 ISBN 978-1118470121
- Yeske, Dave and Buie, Elissa; "Policy-Based Financial Planning: Decision Rules for a Changing World," chapter 11 of "Investor Behavior: The Psychology of Financial Planning and Investing," Wiley Finance, February 10, 2014 ISBN 978-1118492987
- Yeske, Dave and Buie, Elissa, "Policy-Based Financial Planning as Decision Architecture," Journal of Financial Planning, December, 2014 http://ssrn.com/abstract=2534233
