= J. J. Jelincic =

American member of the CalPERS Board

Joseph John Jelincic Jr.
- Born: October 5, 1948 (age 77); Chico, California, United States
- Education: B.S. Economics, M.B.A Finance
- Alma mater: Saint Mary's College of California, Golden Gate University
- Occupation: Investment Officer
- Employer: State of California
- Title: Member-At-Large, CalPERS Board of Administration
- Term: January 2010 – January 2018
- Spouse: Christine Jelincic
- Children: Joseph John Jelincic III, Mary Jelincic
- Website: http://www.jjforcalpers.org

Joseph John Jelincic Jr. (born October 5, 1948) is an American member of the California Public Employees' Retirement System (CalPERS) Board and is the past president of the California State Employees Association (CSEA), a labor group representing 140,000 active and retired state employees. A rank-and-file investment officer for the CalPERS since 1986, he was elected to the CalPERS Board of Administration in December 2009 as a Member-At-Large representing all CalPERS members.

He serves on the Finance Committee, Health Benefits Committee, Investment Committee and is the Vice Chair of the Investment Policy Subcommittee. Jelincic has a wide range of investment experience, having worked in the global equity, fixed income and real estate units of the pension fund's Investment Office. He also helped establish CalPERS futures unit, ran the stock trading desk, and contributed to CalPERS corporate governance initiatives.

== Personal ==
Jelincic was born in Chico, California, United States, and raised in the San Francisco Bay Area. He earned a bachelor's degree in economics from Saint Mary's College of California in Moraga and has an M.B.A. in finance from Golden Gate University in San Francisco. He holds a Chartered Financial Analyst designation (an international professional designation offered by the CFA Institute). He lives in Hayward with his wife of over 30 years, and has two grown children.

== Union leadership ==
Jelincic started his union activism as a member of Oakland Teamsters Local 70 while working as a garbage collector and later a truck driver. He joined California state service in 1986 and became active in CSEA's Civil Service Division, which is now known as SEIU Local 1000.

He is known for his years of service as chair of the Unit 1 bargaining team, representing more than 43,000 rank-and-file state workers such as employment program representatives at the Employment Development Department (EDD), disability evaluators at the Department of Health Services (DHS), accounting officers, auditors and analysts for all departments.

Jelincic was elected in November 2003 as president of the California State Employees Association, on a ticket promising to give the four association affiliates greater control over their individual programs, while working together as CSEA on issues of common interest. He was reelected in October 2005. His term ended October 2007, when he lost to Dave Hart, a fellow member of SEIU Local 1000, an affiliated Union of CSEA. Jelincic was appointed in 2004 by California Governor Arnold Schwarzenegger to the California Performance Review (CPR) Commission. As a commissioner, Jelincic participate in public hearings up and down California on proposals to reform state government, put together by the "CPR Team". He was the only representative of working Californians on the commission.

== CalPERS ==
In 2009, Jelincic launched a campaign for CalPERS board of administration for Seat A in the at-large election. He had a wide range of support from labor, retirees, and other employee groups. While he received the most votes out of four candidates, no candidate received a majority of the vote in the first round of balloting. A runoff election was held in December 2009, and Jelincic defeated Cathy Hackett.

Jelincic is known for being an outspoken advocate for retirement security of working people. He frequently appears in the media about the subject. In August/September 2015, this took the form of criticism of CALPERS staff for their approach to fees paid to private equity fund managers.

== Sexual harassment ==
On September 14, 2011, the LA Times reported that Mr. Jelincic was censured after he received a reprimand for sexually harassing co-workers while he was an investment adviser. "As part of the board's reprimand, Jelincic was stripped until March 1 of his position as chairman of the pension fund's investment policy subcommittee and vice chairman of the health benefits committee. He also lost most of his board travel privileges for the same period." The State Personnel Board upheld the reprimand. Two years later, in 2013, Jelincic was re-elected to another four-year term on the Board.

In 2019, after retiring from active service as an employee with CalPERS, Jelincic challenged incumbent Henry Jones for a seat on the board designated as an “at large” representative of all CalPERS retirees. In a series of articles in the Sacramento Bee, the accusers from the original complaint in 2011 came forward and reiterated their opposition to Jelincic's presence on the Board and publicly challenged his candidacy and inaction of the board regarding his behavior. As a result of the increased visibility of the issue, California State Treasurer Fiona Ma and state Senator Connie Leyva, chair of the Legislative Women's Caucus initiated a letter signed by them and other prominent women leaders demanding that Jelincic remove his name from the ballot because of his failure to acknowledge or take responsibility for his behavior. Jelincic subsequently lost his election bid by a 66 to 34% margin but challenged the 2019 election results (using a process outlined in state law using independent arbitrators) alleging various violations of internal CalPERS campaign procedures chiefly regarding the publicizing of his sexual harassment history. He withdrew his challenge one day before an initial hearing with the Office of Administrative Hearings.

== Strained Relations on the CalPERS Board ==
Jelincic also ran into trouble with other members of the CalPERS Board in 2017 over an alleged breach of rules relating to the leak of confidential Board documents to news outlets. Jelincic maintained he was upholding principles of transparency and denied he was the source of the leaks. Without admitting guilt, he agreed to attend training on confidentiality as a board member, but his relationship with board members was strained.

== See also ==
- California State Employees Association
- SEIU Local 1000
