= Pollyanna Chu =

Hong Kong businesswoman, billionaire

Pollyanna Chu (Chu Yuet wah)
- 朱李月華

CEO of the Kingston Financial Group
- Incumbent
- Assumed office 6 April 2005

Chairman of the Sincere Watch (Hong Kong) Limited
- Incumbent
- Assumed office 13 July 2012
- Preceded by: Tay Liam Wee

Chairman of Po Leung Kuk
- In office 1 April 2015 – 1 April 2016
- Preceded by: Angela Leong
- Succeeded by: Eleanor Kwok Law

Personal details
- Born: Yuet Wah Lee; 3 August 1958 (age 68) British Hong Kong
- Spouse: Nicholas Chu
- Children: 1
- Education: Golden Gate University
- Occupation: CEO of Kingston Financial Group; CEO of Golden Resorts Group; Chairman of Sincere Watch

Pollyanna Chu (Chu Yuet Wah; Chinese: 朱李月華) is a Hong Kong businesswoman. She is an executive of Kingston Financial Group, Golden Resorts Group, and Sincere Watch. As of 30 January 2018, Chu's estimated net worth was US $10.2 billion, making her the 14th richest person in Hong Kong.

== Early life ==
Chu was born in 1958 as Yuet Wah Lee in British Hong Kong. Her father was Wai Man Lee. She grew up in Aberdeen, Hong Kong.

== Education ==
Pollyanna Chu moved to the United States at the age of 18. She holds a Bachelor of Arts degree in Management from Golden Gate University and was awarded an Honorary Ph.D. in Business Management by York University in Toronto, Canada.

== Personal life ==
Chu married Nicholas Chu, whom she met while studying in San Francisco. She has one child, Kingston, who was born in San Francisco, but raised in Hong Kong. In November 2015, her son Kingston married Kelly Lo in Hong Kong.

In December 2021, Chu was eligible to vote four times in the 2021 Hong Kong legislative election, yielding 0.0337997% of the total voting value (elected seats), which is 6801 times more than the average voter's total voting value.

== Career ==
Pollyanna and her husband Nicholas Chu became involved in property investment at her father's recommendation and moved to Hong Kong in 1992 to pursue this interest.

=== Kingston Financial Group ===
Following success in California real estate, the couple founded Kingston Financial Group Ltd in 1992. The company was named after their son. Chu was managing director. Kingston Financial was co-managed by Nicholas Chu. The company initially focused on IPO distribution and mergers and acquisitions.

In 2016, Chu became the CEO and executive director of Kingston Financial Group. At that time, she also became the biggest shareholder.

=== Securities and Futures Commission ===
In 1997, she was "fined...for working as an unregistered dealer." Chu was accused of market manipulation in 2003 by the Securities and Futures Commission.

=== Golden Resorts Group ===
Chu is the CEO of Golden Resorts Group Limited, an entity engaged in the hotel and gambling business, most notably Casa Real Hotel and Grandview Hotel in Macau.

=== Sincere Watch ===
In 2012, Chu bought a 100% stake in Sincere Watch Limited, which is run by her son, Kingston Chu.

In May 2012, Chu became the executive director of Sincere Watch (Hong Kong) Limited and director of Sincere Watch Limited. In July 2012, she became the chairman of Sincere Watch (Hong Kong) Limited.

In July 2012, she was named chairwoman of Franck Muller's Asia-Pacific operations.

== Organization ==
- Chief Executive Officer of Kingston Financial Group (1031.HK)
- Chairman of Sincere Watch (Hong Kong) Limited (444.HK)

=== Awards ===
Chu was given an "Outstanding Chinese Prize" in 2008. In 2012, Forbes Asia listed her as one of their "Women In The Mix," their #35 Power Woman of 2017, their #549 'Billionaire' of 2016, and their #16 out of 'Hong Kong's 50 Richest' in 2016.
