= Monique Morrow =

Tech executive

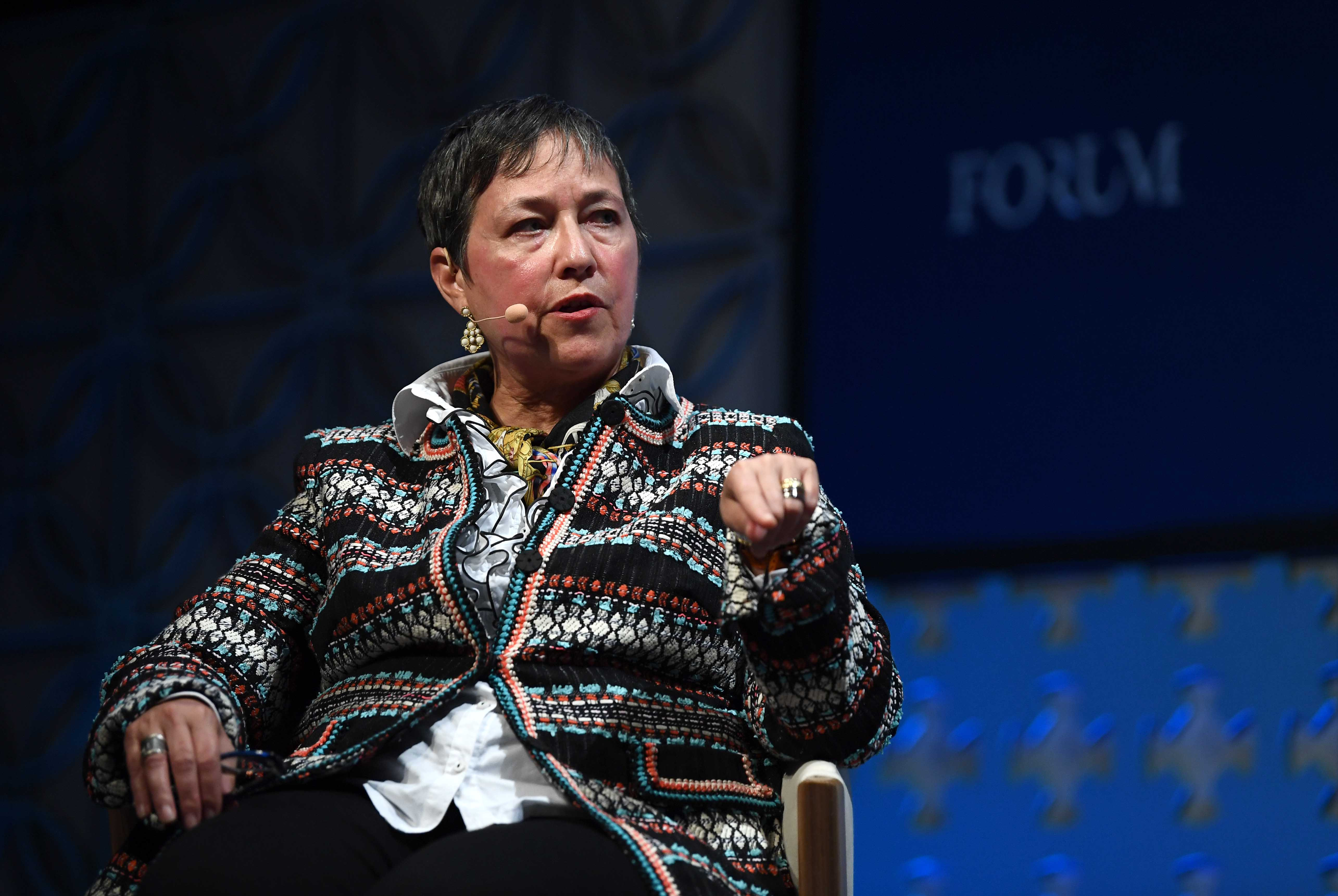
- Education: Golden Gate University (Master's); University of Nicosia (Master's); City University of Seattle (MBA); San Jose University (Bachelor of Arts); University of Southern California (Graduate Certificate); University of Paris
- Occupation: Independent board member for Hedera
- Website: https://www.moniquemorrow.net/

Monique Morrow is a Swiss-American businesswoman, technology engineer, and entrepreneur. She is president and co-founder of the Humanized Internet, a nonprofit focused on providing individuals with a digital identity. She was previously Senior Distinguished Architect of Emerging Technologies at Syniverse, and CTO and Evangelist of New Frontiers Development and Engineering at Cisco Systems, Inc. She sits on a number of advisory boards and has 17 patents related to digitalization, networks, the Internet of Things, cybersecurity, and the safe handling of data.

== Education ==
Morrow holds a master's degree in Telecommunications Management from Golden Gate University, a master’s in Blockchain and Cryptocurrency from Nicosia University, an MBA from City University of Seattle (Zurich, Switzerland Program) and a BA in French from San Jose University. She holds a Graduate Certificate in Information Systems from the University of Southern California and a Diploma of Higher Studies from the University of Paris Sorbonne.

== Career ==
Morrow began her career in 1982 as a network engineer at Advanced Micro Devices. From 1990 to 1994, she worked as a network engineer at Ascom Hasler. From 1994 to 2000, she was a network design engineer at Swisscom. She later joined Syniverse and became Senior Distinguished Architect of Emerging Technologies.

Morrow worked at Cisco Systems Inc. for seventeen years, eventually being promoted to CTO and Evangelist of New Frontiers Development and Engineering where she led the exploration economics, technology, and research.

Since 2017, Morrow has been the President and co-founder of a non-profit organization, The Humanized Internet. The nonprofit uses technology to build verifiable identities for the more than a billion people in the world who do not have one, including those displaced by war and famine. The focus is on creating and giving each person secure, sovereign control over their digital identity. The organization was named Tech Non-Profit Organization of the Year (Global) in BWM’s 2018 Brand of the Year Awards.

Morrow is a venture partner at Sparklabs Accelerator for Cybersecurity and Blockchain, and advises tech companies and organizations. She is one of the independent board members for Hedera and served as a Chair for GSMA-DLT Group, a working group that consists of mobile carriers and solution providers that are focused to create standards for Distributed Ledger Technology. Morrow helped launch the Women in Standardization Expert Group for ITU and is an Associate Researcher at the Humboldt University’s Institute of Internet and Society. She is co-chair of the IEEE Ethics in AI and Autonomous Systems Mixed Reality Committee and chair of the IEEEP7030 and IEEE7016 working groups. She previously was an associated researcher at the Alexander von Humboldt Institute for Internet and Society, and the Fiber To The Home (FTTH) Council Asia Pacific president.

=== Patents ===
Morrow holds a number of American (USPTO) patents related to digitalization, networks, the Internet of Things, cybersecurity, and the safe handling of data.

== Selected publications ==
=== Books ===
- Nada, Anid; Laurie, Cantileno; Morrow, Monique J.; Zafar, Rahilla (2016-09-09). The Internet of Women: Accelerating Culture Change. River Publishers. ISBN 978-87-93379-68-8.
- Alfawakheeri, Akram; Kovarski, Mark; Morrow, Monique J.; Greenberg, Ann; Kumar, Adithya; Gasteiger, Daniel; Hughes, Frances (2023-08-30). The Humanized Internet. River Publishers. ISBN 978-87-7022-032-3.
- "Intercloud: Solving Interoperability and Communication in a Cloud of Clouds | Cisco Press". www.ciscopress.com.
- Morrow, Monique; Vijayananda, Kateel (2003). Developing IP-Based Services. Morgan Kaufmann. ISBN 9781558607798.

=== Articles ===
- Morrow, M.J.; Tatipamula, M.; Farrel, A. (2005). "GMPLS: the promise of the next-generation optical control plane". IEEE Communications Magazine. 43 (7): 26–27. Bibcode:2005IComM..43g..26M. doi:10.1109/MCOM.2005.1470802. S2CID 9796473.
- Dini, P.; Hasan, M.Z.; Morrow, M.; Parr, G.; Rolin, P. (2004). "IP/MPLS OAM: Challenges and directions". 2004 IEEE International Workshop on IP Operations and Management. pp. 1–8. doi:10.1109/IPOM.2004.1547584. ISBN 0-7803-8836-4. S2CID 13975478.
- "Internet of Things: Architectural Framework for eHealth Security". Research Gate.
- Morrow, Monique J.; Zarrebini, Mehran (2019). "Blockchain and the Tokenization of the Individual: Societal Implications". Future Internet. 11 (10): 220. doi:10.3390/fi11100220. ISSN 1999-5903.
- "Technical Leadership". www.metanoia-inc.com.
- "Perspectives on new work". Sitra. 2016-08-17.

== Awards ==
- 2014 GEM-TECH Award (now the EQUALS in Tech Awards)
- 2015 FDM Everywoman in Tech finalist (Inspiration category)
- Business Worldwide Magazine's 2016 Visionary of the Year (Technology, Social Change and Ethics) and 2016 Social Media Champion of the Year
- “Top 10 Women in Cloud” Innovations Award, CloudNOW, 2016
- AI's Social Media Presence of the Year 2016
- 2017 laureate from the Committee for the Henley & Partners Global Citizen Award
- Top 50 EMEA Influencers in Data Center and Cloud (2017)
- 2017 DECA International Entrepreneurial Spirit Award
- The World's Top 50 Women in Tech 2018
- Top Digital Shapers 2018 in Switzerland
- 100 Most Influential People in Identity (2019) by OneWorldIdentity
- Global Technology Leadership Award 2020, WomenTech Global Awards
- 100 Women in Tech Leaders to Watch in 2022, WomenTech Network
