= Julia Jeter Cleckley =

American army officer (born 1944)

- Born: September 30, 1944 (age 81); Aliquippa, Pennsylvania
- Education: Hunter College; Golden Gate University
- Children: 2
- Military career
- Branch: Army National Guard
- Service years: 1962-2004
- Rank: Brigadier general

Julia Jeter Cleckley (born 1944) was the first African American female General in the National Guard (United States). She is an author, consultant, and keynote speaker.

== Career ==
Julia Jeter Cleckley joined the Women's Army Corps after graduating from Aliquippa High School in 1962, knowing that the G.I. Bill would fund her college education. She earned the rank specialist E-5.

Cleckley graduated from Hunter College with a bachelor's degree in psychology and education. The next year she joined the National Guard (United States) as a First Lieutenant in the Adjutant General's Corps with the 42nd Infantry Division, New York Army National Guard. She led the diversity and mentoring program through its early development.

In 1981 following the death of her first husband, Cleckley went on active duty in the Army National Guard full-time. Cleckley continued her education, earning a master's in human resources management from Golden Gate University and studying at the Fletcher School of Law and Diplomacy with the United States Army War College

. In 1994, Cleckley was promoted to Colonel, becoming the first African American woman to hold the rank in the Army National Guard's Active Reserve Program. In 1987, she was assigned to the National Guard Bureau Military Personnel Branch and stationed at The Pentagon. In 1993, Cleckley became the Chief of the Inspections & Analysis Division. She was the first woman assigned to be a division chief at the National Guard Bureau.

In April 2001, Cleckley became the first woman to be assigned as the Chief Human Resources Officer for the Army National Guard. In July 2002, Cleckley assumed duties as Special Assistant to the Director, Army National Guard. In this position, she assisted the Director with Human Resources programs. On September 1, 2002, Cleckley was promoted to Brigadier General, making her the first African American female General in the U.S. Army National Guard, and the third one-star general in the Army Guard.

Cleckley chaired the Army National Guard Equal Employment Opportunity (EEO) Committee, and was the military special assistant to the President of the Federally Employed Women. Cleckley retired in 2004.

In 2014, Cleckley published a memoir, A Promise Fulfilled.

After retiring from the military, Cleckley founded Cleckley Enterprises, a speaking and consulting firm.

== Personal life ==
Cleckley was born in Aliquippa, Pennsylvania on September 30, 1944.

In 1981, Cleckley's first husband died. She remarried in 1996. The couple divorced in 2002. Cleckley has two daughters.
