= Susan Pamerleau =

United States Marshal

Susan Lewellyn Pamerleau
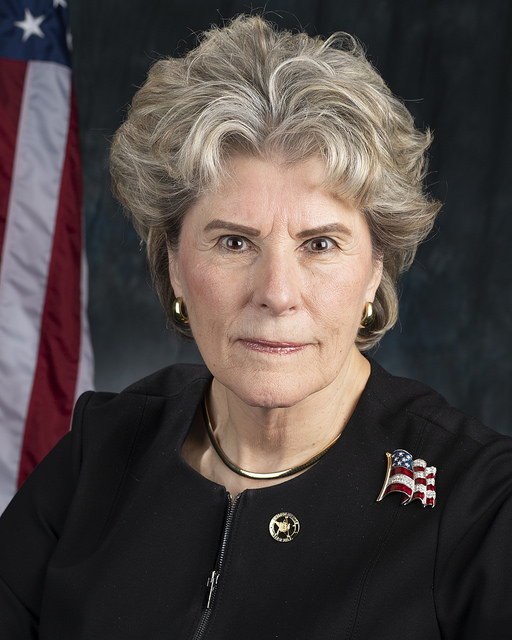
- Official portrait, 2018

United States Marshal for the Western District of Texas
- Incumbent
- Assumed office September 17, 2018
- Appointed by: Donald Trump
- Preceded by: Robert Almonte

Sheriff of Bexar County, Texas
- In office January 1, 2013 – December 31, 2016
- Preceded by: Amadeo Ortiz
- Succeeded by: Javier Salazar

Personal details
- Born: July 29, 1946 (age 80) Knoxville, Tennessee, U.S.
- Party: Republican
- Education: University of Wyoming; Golden State University; University of Pennsylvania; Harvard University; Kellogg School of Management

Military service
- Branch/service: United States Air Force
- Years of service: 1968–2000
- Rank: Major General

Susan Lewellyn Pamerleau (born July 29, 1946) is a retired United States Air Force major general serving as the United States Marshal for the Western District of Texas since 2018. A member of the Republican Party, she served as the sheriff of Bexar County, Texas from 2013 to 2016.

== Personal life ==
Pamerleau is the daughter of Disciples of Christ minister Dr. Truce V. Lewellyn (of Walnut Cove, North Carolina) and the late Mary Nelle [nee Montgomery] Lewellyn (of Knoxville, Tennessee). Pamerleau received a BA degree in sociology from the University of Wyoming at Laramie in 1968 and an M.P.A. from Golden Gate University in 1977.

In 1978, after first seeking marriage counseling help, Pamerleau left her abusive husband, Ben, after a marriage of seven years. Following the separation, Ben took his own life. During her 2012 campaign, Pamerleau cited her experience as a survivor of family violence as part of what prepared her to serve as sheriff. In addition, her focus on mental illness in the criminal justice system was personal, as she has a brother who suffered from mental illness.

== Career ==
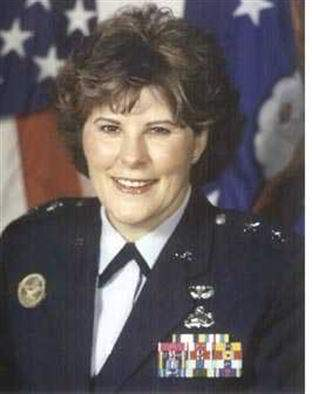
Pamerleau's Air Force picture

=== United States Air Force ===
Pamerleau served in the United States Air Force for 32 years, being promoted to brigadier general in 1994 and to major general in 1997. Her first assignment as a general officer in the United States Air Force was as commandant of the Air Force Reserve Officer Training Corps. Her next assignment was as the Commander of the Air Force Personnel Center, followed by her last assignment at Headquarters Air Force in The Pentagon as the director, Personnel Force Programs.

==== Assignments ====
- September 1968 – July 1970, administration and personnel officer, 1928th Communications Group, MacDill Air Force Base, Fla.
- August 1970 – July 1971, Women in the Air Force coordinator, Detachment 204, 3502nd Recruiting Group, Richmond, Va.
- August 1971 – April 1973, administrative management officer, 31st Field Maintenance Squadron, Homestead Air Force Base, Fla.
- April 1973 – April 1974, executive support officer, 3rd Civil Engineering Squadron, Kunsan Air Base, South Korea
- April 1974 – September 1978, commander, Women in the Air Force Squadron, later chief, central base administration, 56th Tactical Fighter Wing, MacDill Air Force Base, Fla.
- September 1978 – November 1979, chief, central base administration, 435th Tactical Airlift Wing, Rhein-Main Air Base, West Germany
- November 1979 – August 1984, staff officer, Deputy Directorate for Bases and Units, Directorate of Programs, Deputy Chief of Staff for Programs and Resources, Headquarters U.S. Air Force, Washington, D.C.
- August 1984 – June 1985, student, Industrial College of the Armed Forces, Fort Lesley J. McNair, Washington, D.C.
- June 1985 – March 1987, chief, Force Programs Division, Directorate of Plans, Programs and Analysis, Air Force Military Personnel Center, Randolph Air Force Base, Texas
- March 1987 – August 1988, commander, 3700th Personnel Resources Group, Air Force Military Training Center, Lackland Air Force Base, Texas
- August 1988 – April 1989, vice wing commander, Air Force Basic Military Training School, Lackland Air Force Base, Texas
- April 1989 – July 1992, executive officer, Plans and Policy Division, International Military Staff, NATO Headquarters, Brussels, Belgium
- July 1992 – March 1993, chief, Resource Allocation Division and Personnel and Support Team, Directorate of Personnel Programs, Deputy Chief of Staff, Personnel, Headquarters U.S. Air Force, the Pentagon, Washington, D.C.
- March 1993 – July 1994, vice commander, Air Force Military Personnel Center, Randolph Air Force Base, Texas
- August 1994 – February 1996, commandant, Headquarters Air Force Reserve Officer Training Corps, Maxwell Air Force Base, Ala.
- February 1996 – May 1998, commander, Air Force Personnel Center, Randolph Air Force Base, Texas
- May 1998 – 2000, director of personnel force management, Deputy Chief of Staff for Personnel, Headquarters U.S. Air Force, the Pentagon, Washington, D.C.

==== Effective dates of promotion ====
- Second Lieutenant September 24, 1968
- First Lieutenant March 24, 1970
- Captain September 24, 1971
- Major May 1, 1980
- Lieutenant Colonel March 1, 1984
- Colonel July 1, 1989
- Brigadier General August 1, 1994
- Major General August 1, 1997

=== USAA ===
After retiring from the Air Force in September 2000, Pamerleau worked at USAA, first as vice president of Membership Development; and later as senior vice president of Specialized Operations & International.

=== Bexar County Sheriff's Office ===
In 2012 Pamerleau was elected the first woman sheriff in the history of Bexar County, Texas. Citing technology and policy issues that were "30 years behind", Pamerleau conducted a top-to-bottom review of the sheriff's office and began implementing policies to modernize the office. Improvements included digital record keeping, stab-vests for detention officers, and improved communications within the jail.

Mental health advocate and journalist, Pete Earley, has said of Bexar County's jail diversion programs "I've been to 48 states, five foreign countries, and I've testified five times before Congress, and Bexar County is known as the gold standard. [Bexar County is the] leading county in America when it comes to jail diversion and stopping the inappropriate incarceration of people who have serious illness like schizophrenia and bipolar disorder."

In the spring of 2016, the Bexar County Deputy Sheriff's Association Union called for a vote of no confidence in Pamerleau. Of the 1,600 deputies in the department, 219 voted no confidence. That summer, Pamerleau faced inquiries about four suicides in the Bexar County Jail that occurred from June 28 to July 22, 2017.

==== 2016 election ====
In the November 8, 2016, general election, Pamerleau narrowly lost to Democrat Javier Salazar, a San Antonio police officer who had never previously sought elected office. Salazar received 278,102 votes (50.4 percent) to Pamerleau's 273,914 (49.6 percent). In defeat, Pamerleau polled more votes in 2016 than she had in victory in 2012.

Shortly before Pamerleau left office, Salazar obtained a temporary restraining order from Judge John D. Gabriel which forbade Pamerleau from making personnel changes in the final days of her administration. Another judge, Gloria Saldana, dissolved the court order in the final hours of Pamerleau's tenure of office.

=== United States Marshal ===
U.S. President Donald Trump nominated Pamerleau to be the United States Marshal for the Western District of Texas, one of the busiest in the country, which includes the cities of San Antonio, Midland/Odessa, El Paso, Austin, and Waco. The Senate confirmed her by voice vote on August 28, 2018. Pamerleau is the first female marshal to head the 173-year-old federal court district.

== Medals and decorations ==
Major General Pamerleau has been awarded the following awards and decorations:

| Air Force Distinguished Service Medal |
| Defense Superior Service Medal |
| Legion of Merit |
| Meritorious Service Medal |
| Air Force Commendation Medal |
| Armed Forces Expeditionary Medal |
