= Riall Nolan =

American anthropologist

Riall W. Nolan (born October 12, 1943) is an American anthropologist, an emeritus professor of anthropology at Purdue University, USA and a faculty member in the MPhil program in International Development at the University of Cambridge, UK. A scholar of international development, cross-cultural adaptation, and applied anthropology, he has conducted research on issues of change and development in Eastern Senegal, Papua New Guinea, Sri Lanka, Tunisia, Somalia, Cote d’Ivoire, Guinea, Indonesia, Thailand, and Western Siberia. His work as a researcher and project specialist has included community led development initiatives with the Peace Corps, USAID, the World Bank, and numerous university and local NGO partners.

His research in economic and cultural change has been published in numerous academic journals, and he is the author of several books on practicing and applied anthropology in the context of development, including Development anthropology: Encounters in the real world (2001, 2018), Using anthropology in the world (2017), Anthropology in practice: building a career outside the academy (2003), and A handbook of practicing anthropology (2016).

== Biography ==
Nolan received a bachelor's degree in psychology from Colgate University in 1965 and then spent three years as a Peace Corps volunteer in Senegal where he worked in community development on issues of rural health and water availability. Following this experience he received a Fulbright scholarship to obtain a DPhil in social anthropology from the University of Sussex in 1975. His doctoral work focused on wage-labor and migration among the Bassari people in Eastern Senegal and was published as Bassari migrations: the quiet revolution in 1986.

During and after this work, Nolan was a lecturer at the University of Papua New Guinea and worked in a variety of research and project manager positions in rural Senegal, urban Tunisia, and Sri Lanka, as well as consulting work with the World Bank. Concurrently, he accepted a position as an assistant professor of anthropology at Georgia State University in 1985, was a faculty member of the School for International Training in 1986, became director of the international management development institute at the graduate school of public and international affairs at the University of Pittsburgh in 1989, dean of international affairs and programs at Golden Gate University in 1995, associate provost and director of the institute for global studies and affairs at the University of Cincinnati in 1998, associate provost and dean of international programs at Purdue University in 2003, professor of anthropology at Purdue University in 2009, and lastly accepted academic visitor positions at Cambridge University and University of Sussex in 2014.

== Scholarship ==
Nolan's research is predominately focused on applied and practicing anthropology, the anthropology of development, and international education. He has written or co-authored eight academic books and over 30 peer-reviewed articles or book chapters in addition to white papers and consultant reports for organizations including national governments, the Peace Corps, USAID, and universities around the world. His most recent book, Using anthropology in the world, was described as "a must-have for any serious anthropologist's digital or physical bookshelf"

== Applied work ==
Nolan is active in several national organizations, including the Society for Applied Anthropology and the Association of International Education Administrators. He is a past board member of both of these associations, and is currently on the national board of Engineers Without Borders. He is also on the editorial board for the UK journal, Anthropology in Action and participated in a 2014 webinar on engaged anthropology and professional development for university students. He has conducted training programs and contributed to the development of service programs including upper-level university administration, several international development agencies, and public and private partners based in Africa, Asia and the Middle East.

== Publications ==
- 1976: Social Science and Society: The Use and Abuse of Social Research in the Third World, UPNG, edited with Michael Donaldson.
- — (1986). Bassari Migrations: The Quiet Revolution. Boulder, CO: Westview Press. ISBN 0-8133-7297-6.
- — (1999). Communicating and Adapting Across Cultures. Westport, CT: Bergin & Garvey. ISBN 0-89789-660-2.
- — (2002). Development Anthropology: Encounters in the Real World. Boulder, CO: Westview Press. ISBN 0-8133-0984-0. Named as an “Outstanding Academic Title” by Choice magazine.
- — (2003). Anthropology in Practice: Building a Career Outside the Academy. Boulder CO: Lynne Rienner Publishers. ISBN 1-55587-985-3.
- —, ed. (2013). A Handbook of Practicing Anthropology. Boston, MA: Wiley-Blackwell. p. 417. ISBN 978-1-118-48434-0.
- Merkx, Gilbert W.; ——, eds. (2015). Internationalizing the Academy: Lessons of Leadership in Higher Education. Boston, MA: Harvard Education Press. ISBN 978-1-61250-867-2.
- — (2017). Using Anthropology in the World: A Guide to Becoming an Anthropologist Practitioner. Oxford, UK: Routledge. ISBN 978-1-351-85692-8.
