= Solomon Darwin =

American business professor

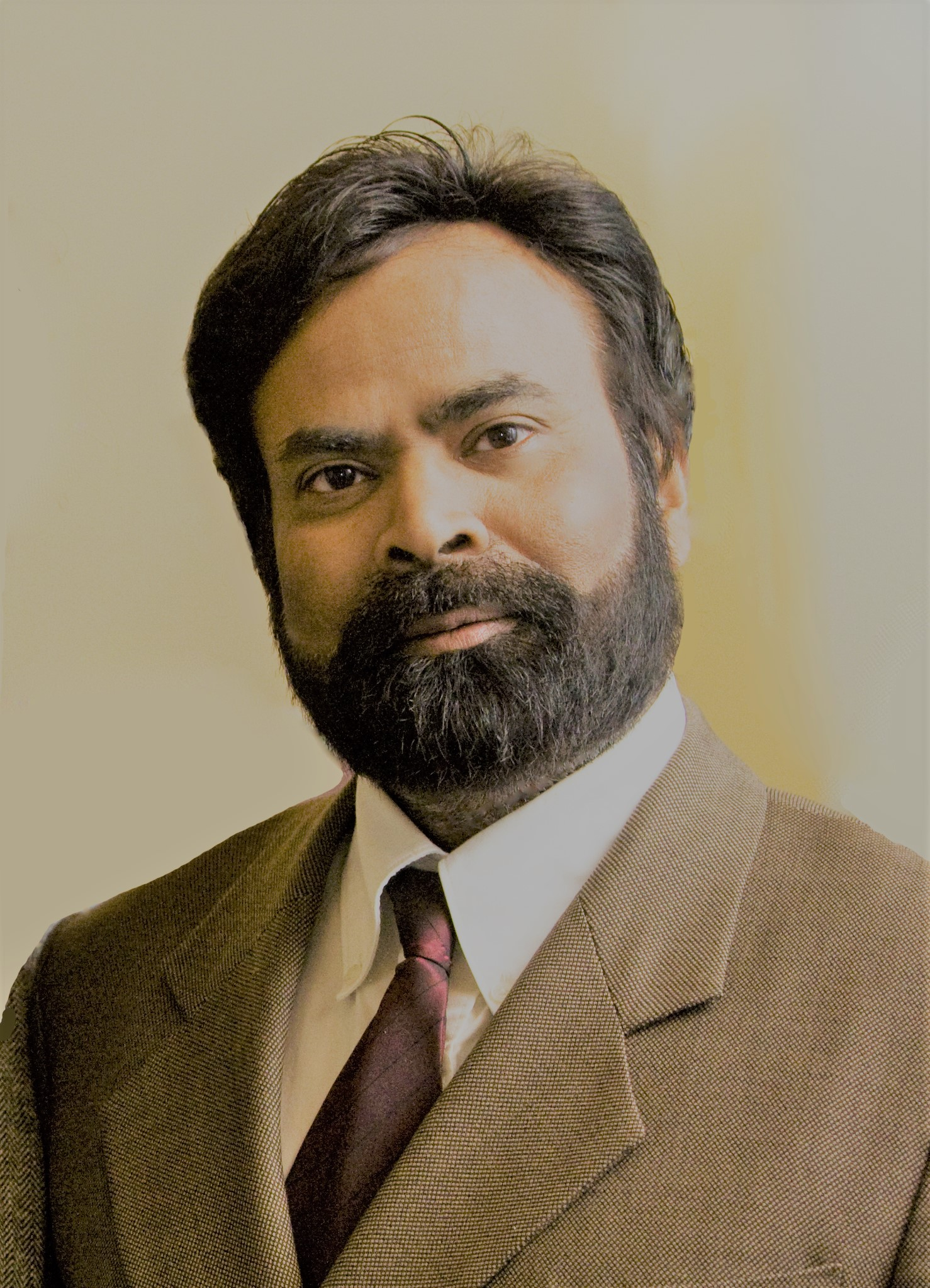
- Education: San Francisco State University; Golden Gate University; Harvard University; University of California, Berkeley
- Occupation: Professor
- Organization: University of California, Santa Cruz
- Known for: Smart Villages
- Spouse: Amy Darwin
- Children: Nena Darwin, Judah Darwin and Jaelle Darwin

Solomon Darwin is an American Professor of Business and Director of Open Innovation at the University of California, Santa Cruz Silicon Valley Campus. He previously served for over two decades as Executive Director of the Garwood Center for Corporate Innovation at the Haas School of Business at the University of California, Berkeley. He is known as the visionary leader of the Smart Village Movement and for developing "smart village frameworks" for rural villages with the support of state and local governments in India and UC Berkeley. He published four books to support his thesis : "How to Create Smart Villages: Open Innovation Solutions for Emerging Markets", "How to Think like the CEO of the Planet", "The Untouchables" and "Smart Villages of Tomorrow: The Road to Mori" and is known as the Father of the Smart Village Movement.

== Biography ==
Solomon Darwin is the director of Open Innovation at the University of California, Santa Cruz. He was the executive director of the Garwood Center for Corporate Innovation at the Haas School of Business and was an associate professor at the University of Southern California from 1996 until 2005 before joining UC Berkeley. Under his leadership, the Garwood Center for Corporate Innovation at UC Berkeley established its first smart village prototype in India. Darwin defines a Smart Village as "a community empowered by Digital Technologies & Open Innovation platforms to access global markets." He argues that such villages are a means of "empowering people with access to tools, resources, real-time transparent information, and uninterrupted internet connectivity."

Darwin has a BA from San Francisco State University, an MBA from Golden Gate University, and an MCCP from Harvard University's Graduate School of Business. As an expert on the subject of "Open Innovation and Business Models" with many years of corporate experience, Darwin is invited as a visiting professor to a myriad of universities around the world: Shanghai Jiao Tong, Pecking, Wuhan, UIBE in China; the University of Zurich in Switzerland; University of Cambridge, University of Oxford, University College London, and Lancaster University in the United Kingdom; Stockholm School of Economics in Sweden; RWTH Aachen, WHU and Fraunhofer Society in Germany; the University of Turku in Finland; BI Norwegian Business School in Norway; Moscow State University in Russia; Korean University in South Korea; Euro‐Med and EM Lyon in France; Chulalongkorn University in Thailand, IIM Ahmedabad, India, Stanford University and Claremont Colleges in California.

== Selected publications ==
- "Resetting the Jewel in the Crown: A Roadmap for Rebuilding India" (with Yashraj Bhardwaj). Peaceful Evolution Publishing, 2021.
- "How to Create Smart Villages: Open Innovation Solutions for Emerging Markets" (with Werner Fischer & Henry Chesbrough). Peaceful Evolution Publishing, 2020.
- "How to Think like the CEO of the Planet: Restoring the Declining Balance Sheet of the Earth" Peaceful Evolution Publishing, 2020.
- "Enhancing Your Brand with Open Innovation. Takeaways from Berkeley Innovation Forum 2019" (with Henry Chesbrough). White Paper, 2019.
- "Prototyping a Scalable Smart Village (B)" (with Henry Chesbrough). Harvard Business Review, 2018.
- "Smart Villages of Tomorrow: The Road to Mori." Peaceful Evolution Publishing, 2018.
- "The Untouchables: Three Generations of Triumph Over Torment". Peaceful Evolution Publishing, 2018.
- "Digital Transformation for Sustainability. Takeaways from WOIC 2018 practitioner sessions" (with Henry Chesbrough). White Paper, 2018.
- "Managerial Takeaways. What We Learned From the Academic Sessions at WOIC 2018" (with Henry Chesbrough). White Paper, 2018.
- "Creating Business Value from Open Innovation. Takeaways from Berkeley Innovation Forum 2018" (with Henry Chesbrough). White Paper, 2018.
- "Prototyping a Scalable Smart Village to Simultaneously Create Sustainable Development and Enterprise Growth Opportunities" (with Henry Chesbrough). Harvard Business Review, 2017.
- "Strategizing open innovation: How middle managers work with performance indicators" (with Jan A. Pfister and Sarah L. Jack). Scandinavian Journal of Management, 2017.
- "Smart Village Ecosystems. An Open Innovation Approach" (with Henry Chesbrough). White Paper prepared for Bill Gates and Hon. Chief Minister Naidu of Andhra Pradesh, 2017.
- "Solving Business Model Challenges. Takeaways from WOIC 2017 practitioner sessions" (with Henry Chesbrough). White Paper, 2017.
- "HCL's Digital Open Innovation: Enhancing Business Model Effectiveness through Talent and Customer Acquisition, Development, and Retention." Harvard Business Review , 2015.
- "Community Outreach Clinics: Sustainability, Schooling Dental Students and Overcoming Oral Health Inequalities" (with Anirudha Agnihotry, Michele G. Daly, Chris S. Ivanoff DDS, Reena Kumar). Journal of Dental Research, 2015.
