= Dan Angel (politician) =

American politician (born 1939)

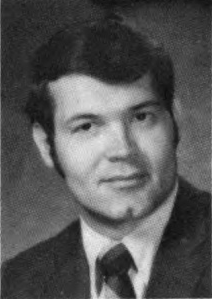

Member of the Michigan House of Representatives from the 49th district
- In office January 1, 1973 – 1978
- Preceded by: James Folks
- Succeeded by: Everitt F. Lincoln

Personal details
- Born: December 23, 1939 (age 86) Detroit, Michigan
- Party: Republican
- Spouse: Patricia Ann Schuster
- Education: Wayne State University; Purdue University

Daniel Duane Angel (born December 23, 1939) is a former member of the Michigan House of Representatives and college administrator.

== Early life ==
Angel was born on December 23, 1939, in Detroit, Michigan.

== Education ==
In 1961, Angel earned a B.S. from Wayne State University. In 1963, Angel earned an M.A. from the same college. Both of these degrees were in education. In 1965, Angel earned a Ph.D. from Purdue University in communications. In 1964, while pursuing this doctoral degree, Angel served as a participant observer in the re-election campaign of Michigan Governor George W. Romney for research purposes. During this time, Angel served as Lenore Romney's escort and drove Governor Romney's press vehicle. Angel conducted six interviews with Governor Romney.

== Career ==
In 1967, Angel released a biography of Romney entitled Romney, A Political Biography. In 1970, Angel released a biography of former Michigan Governor William Milliken entitled William G. Milliken: A Touch of Steel. On November 7, 1972, Angel was elected to the Michigan House of Representatives, where he represented the 49th district from January 1, 1973, until his resignation early in 1978. Angel resigned due to the frustration found in dealing with the various agendas in a legislative body. Angel went on to work as a college administrator. Angel went on to serve as the president of six colleges in three different states. At some point, Angel served as the president of Imperial Valley College and Stephen F. Austin University. He served as president of Marshall University from 2000 to 2005. In January 2005, with over 30 years of college administration experience, Angel started serving as the president of Golden Gate University. On August 3, 2015, Angel retired from the position.

== Personal life ==
In 1965, Angel married Patricia Ann Schuster. Angel is Methodist.

== See also ==
- List of presidents and principals of Marshall University
