= Financial Planning Association =

Organization

- Formation: 2000; 26 years ago
- Type: Professional association
- Location: Denver, United States
- Region served: United States
- Members: 22,000 (2022)
- Website: www.financialplanningassociation.org

Financial Planning Association (FPA) is the largest membership organization in the US representing financial planners. Current membership is 22,000.

FPA is primarily focused on supporting Certified Financial Planner members.

== History ==
The organization was formed from the merger of the Institute of Certified Financial Planners and the International Association for Financial Planning on January 1, 2000.

The International Association for Financial Planning was founded in 1970 and the Institute of Certified Financial Planners was formed in 1973 by the first graduating class of the College for Financial Planning.
