= Golden Gate University =

Private university in San Francisco, California, US

- Former names: YMCA Evening College (1901–1923); Golden Gate College (1923–1972)
- Motto: Civium in moribus rei publicae salus (Latin)
- Motto in English: "The welfare of the state depends upon the morals of its citizens"
- Type: Private university
- Established: 1901; 125 years ago
- Accreditation: WSCUC
- Endowment: $48.9 million (2024)
- President: Brent White, President
- Provost: Bruce Magid, PhD
- Dean: Mark Yates, Dean of the School of Law and the Braden School of Taxation | Nate Hinerman, PhD, Dean of the School of Undergraduate Studies
- Director: Robert Schoffner, Executive Director Ageno School of Business and School of Accounting
- Faculty: 653
- Students: 5,220 (2023)
- Location: San Francisco, California, US; 37.7893°N 122.3989°W
- Campus: Urban
- Colors: Blue and Gray
- Website: ggu.edu

Golden Gate University (GGU or Golden Gate) is a private university in San Francisco, California, United States. Founded in 1901, GGU specializes in educating professionals through its schools of law, business, taxation, technology, accounting, and undergraduate studies. The university offers 4 undergraduate degrees and 18 graduate degree programs.

== History ==
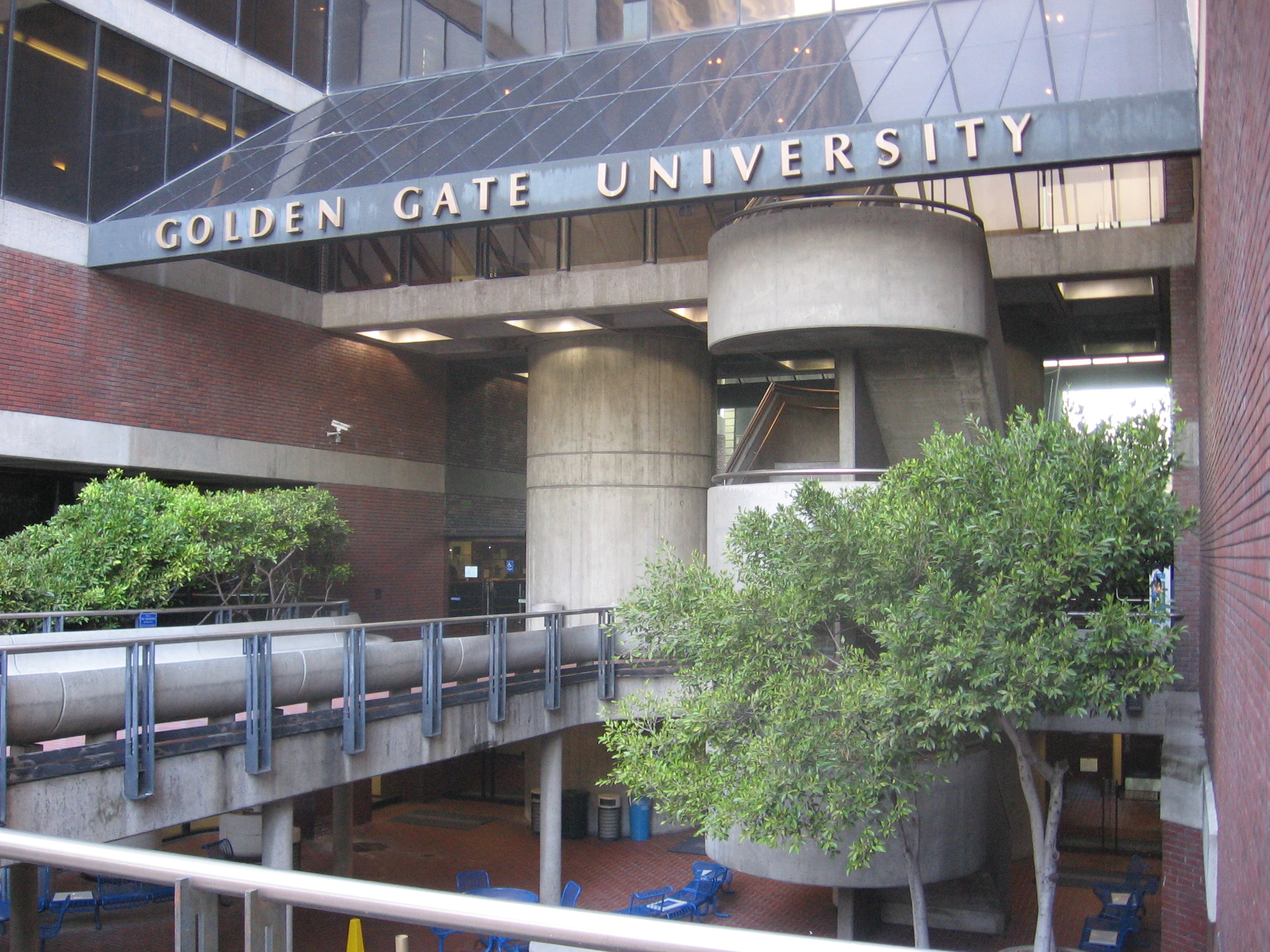
GGU Campus

Golden Gate University evolved out of the literary reading groups of the San Francisco Central YMCA at a time when, according to one contemporary estimate, only one of every two thousand men had a college education. GGU shares its YMCA roots with a number of other U.S. universities, including Bentley University, Capital University Law School, Michigan State University College of Law, Northeastern University (Boston, Massachusetts), Northern Kentucky University Salmon P. Chase College of Law, Roosevelt University, South Texas College of Law, University of Toledo College of Law, Western New England University, and Youngstown State University. On November 1, 1881 at the YMCA building at 232 Sutter Street, which the organization had occupied since 1868, the YMCA Night School was established. Classes were offered in bookkeeping, mathematics, stenography, elocution, Spanish and gymnastics. Successful completion of these courses led to a certificate that was recognized by more than 100 colleges and trade schools. Other offerings of the association would include a common school for boys. In April 1894 the YMCA moved to a new five-story building at the northeast corner of Mason and Ellis Streets.

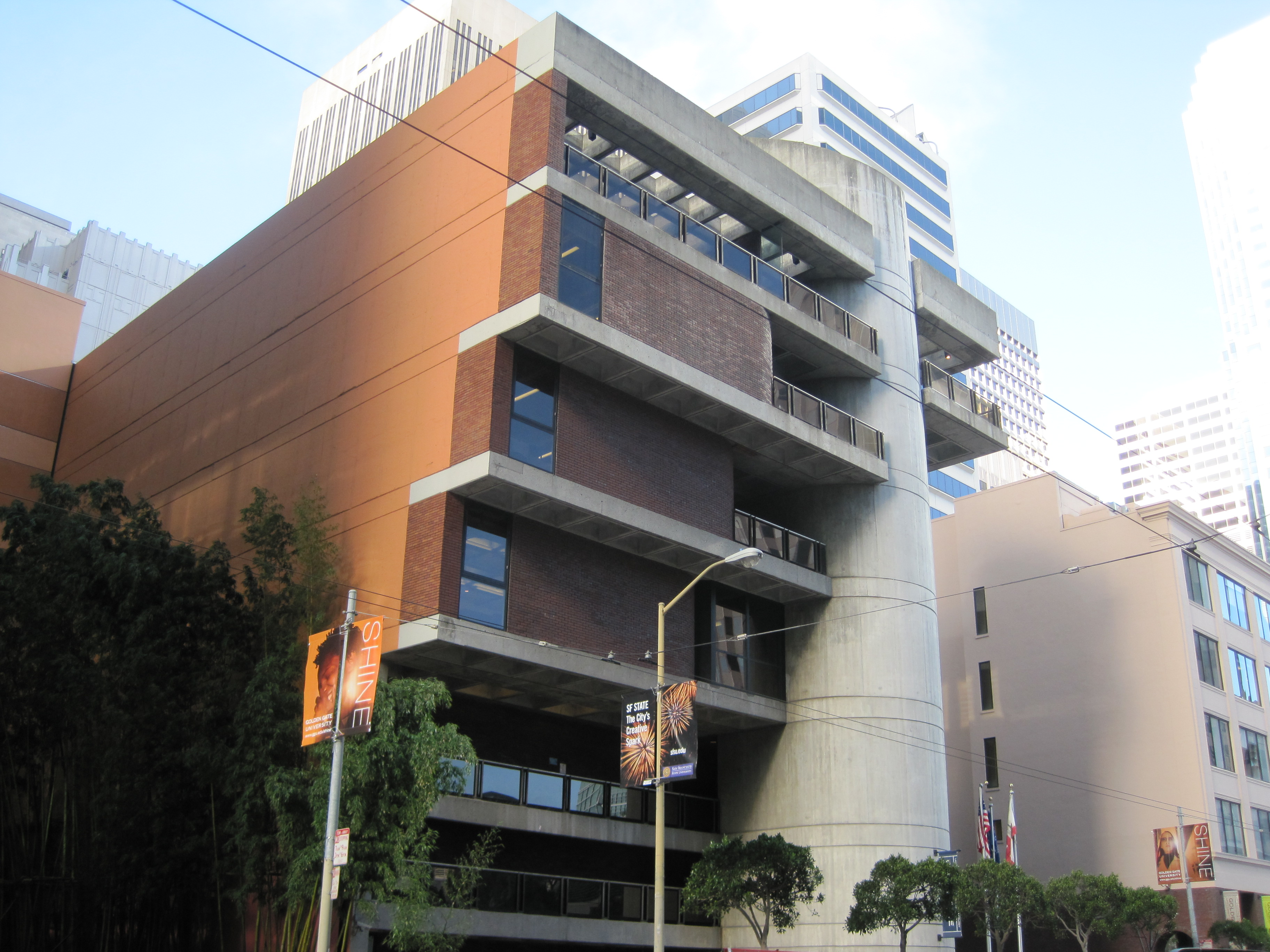
West Wing of GGU's SF Campus

The night school was renamed the Evening College on October 1, 1896, and became a full-fledged operation in 1901 with the creation of a law school. The law school was the first of the Y's educational departments to offer a full degree-level course, and thus the university traces its founding to the law school's establishment. Courses in Accountancy and Business Administration leading to the degree of Bachelor of Commercial Science began in 1908. Later, courses in foreign trade were added. The YMCA building was destroyed in the fire that followed the 1906 earthquake. Following the earthquake, the school was conducted out of tents, and later leased space at 1220 Geary St. (now Geary Boulevard near Franklin Street in the Western Addition). In November 1910 the school moved into the YMCA's new building (closed in 2009) at 220 Golden Gate Avenue at Leavenworth Street, in the Tenderloin neighborhood.

A student contest in 1927 resulted in the adoption of the new name Golden Gate because contest judges thought it symbolized "romantic California". The institution was separately incorporated from the Central YMCA on May 18, 1923, as Golden Gate College with the power to confer degrees as California law then provided. The college became fully independent of the YMCA in 1962; however, the "Y" contributed members to the school's Board of Trustees for some time thereafter.

The college continued to share the YMCA's building until June 1968, when it moved into the Allyne Building, a warehouse at 536 Mission Street originally built in 1924 as the showroom and wholesale department of Sherman Clay, a large retailer of pianos, records, record players, and other musical instruments. The college had purchased the building at auction in April 1964, and the law school had occupied the first two floors since December 1964.

In 1972, the college expanded and elevated itself to university status. In 1979, a new "west wing" of the university was completed, where most of the classroom space is located today.

== Academics ==
Golden Gate University is primarily a post-graduate institution focused on professional training in law and business, with its smaller undergraduate programs linked to its larger graduate and professional schools. Its six schools, with the year a university degree was first offered in the academic discipline, are:

- Golden Gate University School of Law (1901)
- Edward S. Ageno School of Business (1908)
- School of Accounting (1908)
- Bruce F. Braden School of Taxation (1970)
- School of Undergraduate Studies (2019)

Golden Gate University School of Law was founded in 1901. The School of Law offers the MSL, LLM, and JSD degrees. The school is no longer accepting students seeking the JD degree.

The School of Undergraduate Studies offers the degrees of AA, BA, and BS.

The Ageno School of Business offers the degrees of MA, MS, MBA, Executive (part-time) MBA (EMBA), MPA, and DBA.

Additionally, the degrees of Master of Arts in Counseling Psychology and Master of Arts in Industrial-Psychology are offered.

The Braden School of Taxation offers a Master of Taxation, and the School of Accounting offers an MS in Accounting Data & Analytics (MSA).

=== Undergraduate admissions ===
Golden Gate University requires a minimum 2.0 high school GPA for admission and does not require submission of either SAT or ACT scores. Some of the bachelor’s degree programs may have additional application requirements. Golden Gate University has not reported high school GPA data for its accepted students.

=== Accreditation ===
Golden Gate University has been accredited by the Western Association of Schools and Colleges (WASC) or its successor organization, the WASC Senior College and University Commission since 1959 as well achieving AACSB (Association to Advance Collegiate Schools of Business) accreditation https://ggu.edu/school/ageno-school-of-business/#accreditation. It had previously been accredited by what is now the Northwest Commission on Colleges and Universities since 1950. Additionally, the school of law has been accredited by the American Bar Association (ABA) since August 1956 and the Committee of Bar Examiners of the State Bar of California since 1940 (standards for accreditation having been adopted in 1937). The university's financial planning program is registered with the Certified Financial Planner Board of Standards and students completing either the undergraduate minor in financial planning or the certificate in financial planning qualify to sit for the Certified Financial Planner (CFP) certification exam.

=== Online programs ===
Golden Gate first offered distance education programs in 1993 via correspondence, online courses in 1997, then began offering fully accredited online degree programs in 1998. Online offerings include 13 graduate degrees, two undergraduate degrees, seven graduate certificates, and 10 undergraduate certificates, all of which can be completed entirely online. GGU currently uses the Moodle online learning platform to manage and deliver course content.

=== Rankings ===
In 2025, U.S. News & World Report did not rank Golden Gate University's undergraduate programs. The only Graduate School Rankings by U.S. News were for the Golden Gate University School of Law (No.178-196 out of 196, bottom 8% at most, and which school discontinued its JD program beginning November 30, 2023), and its Public Affairs Program (tied for No.247 out of 271 programs).

== Administration ==
At its incorporation as a separate institution from the YMCA in 1923, the college governance was divided between a four-member (increased to nine members in 1948) Board of Governors, which ran educational programs of the college including the conferral of degrees, and a five-member Board of Trustees to hold the college property. The appointments of the director, governors and trustees were made by the San Francisco YMCA. A 1948 reorganization raised the director of education to president, the incumbent director, Nagel T. Miner (since 1931), becoming president. In September 1949 the board of governors and board of trustees were merged, with all current trustees retiring, and the members of the board of governors being elected onto the board of trustees, which had 14 members out of a possible maximum of 21 members.

Currently, the university is managed by a self-sustaining board of trustees of between 15 and 20 members. Trustees serve 3-year terms with one-third up for election annually. The president of the university and the president of the Alumni Association hold voting seats on the board. Additionally, there are four non-voting ex officio members, the President of the Student Government, the President of the Student Bar Association (law school student government); the President of the University Faculty Senate, and the chair of the law faculty. The trustees are selected from the worlds of business, law, accounting, taxation, and philanthropy. Since 2003 the majority of trustees have been alumni of the university. Of the current trustees all but three have at least one academic degree (excluding honorary degrees) from GGU.

The day-to-day operation of the university is in the hands of a president, provost, vice-presidents, and the deans of the schools (Accounting, Business, Law, Undergraduate Studies, and Taxation).

=== Presidents ===
Before 1948, the top executive was called the educational director.

No.	Name	Term
1.	Arthur A. Macurda	1901–1914
2.	Archie R. Mack	1914–1931
3.	Nagel T. Miner	1931–1958
4.	Russell T. Sharpe	1958–1970
5.	Otto W. Butz	1970–1992
6.	Thomas M. Stauffer	1992–1999
7.	Philip Friedman	1999–2007
8.	Dan Angel	2007–2015
9.	David J. Fike	2015–2025
10.	Brent White	2025–current

== Campus ==
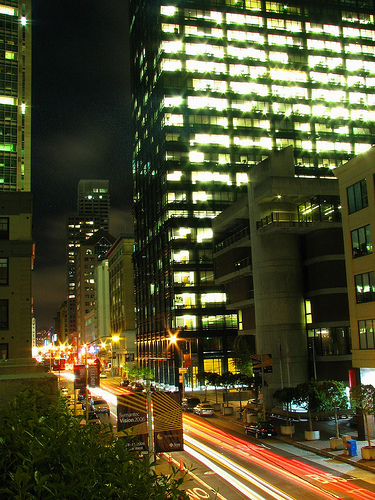
GGU shown at night--second building from the right (the taller building behind is the Chase Bank)

The GGU campus is located at 536 Mission St, San Francisco, CA 94105 in the Financial District of San Francisco.

== Students ==
Roughly 67 percent of students who attend Golden Gate University are in graduate business programs, 12 percent are in undergraduate programs, and 21 percent were law students, the law school announcing that it would discontinue its JD program on November 30, 2023.

According to Data USA, "The enrolled student population at Golden Gate University-San Francisco is 32.4% White, 17.5% Hispanic or Latino, 17.2% Asian, 12.7% Black or African American, 1.65% Native Hawaiian or Other Pacific Islanders, 1.32% American Indian or Alaska Native, and 1.11% Two or More Races."

== Notable alumni and faculty ==
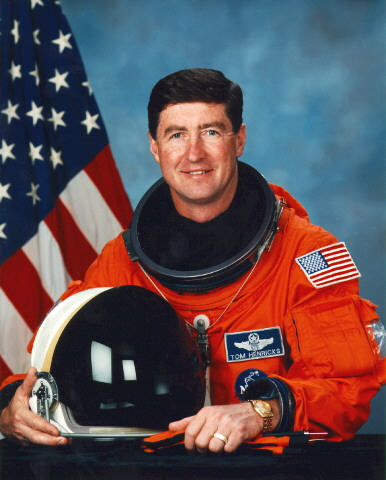
Terence Henricks, MPA '82, one of the former commanders of the Space Shuttle Columbia

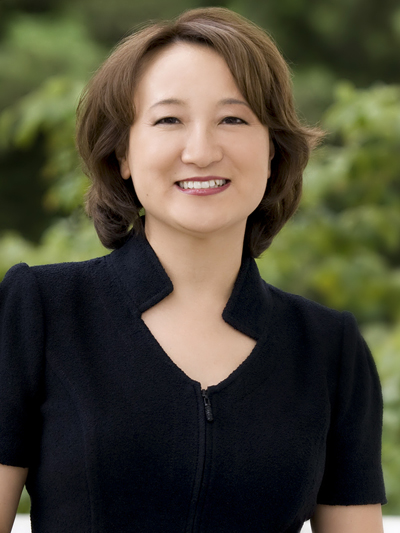
Mary Hayashi, MBA, Democratic former California State Assembly member. First Korean-American woman in California's legislative history.

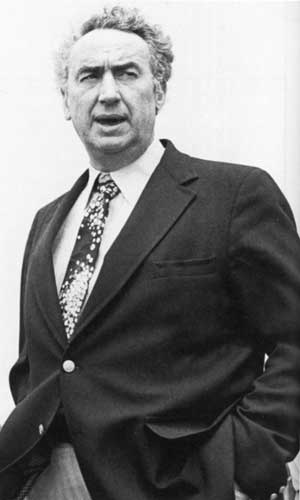
Philip Burton, LLB '52, deceased former US Congressman

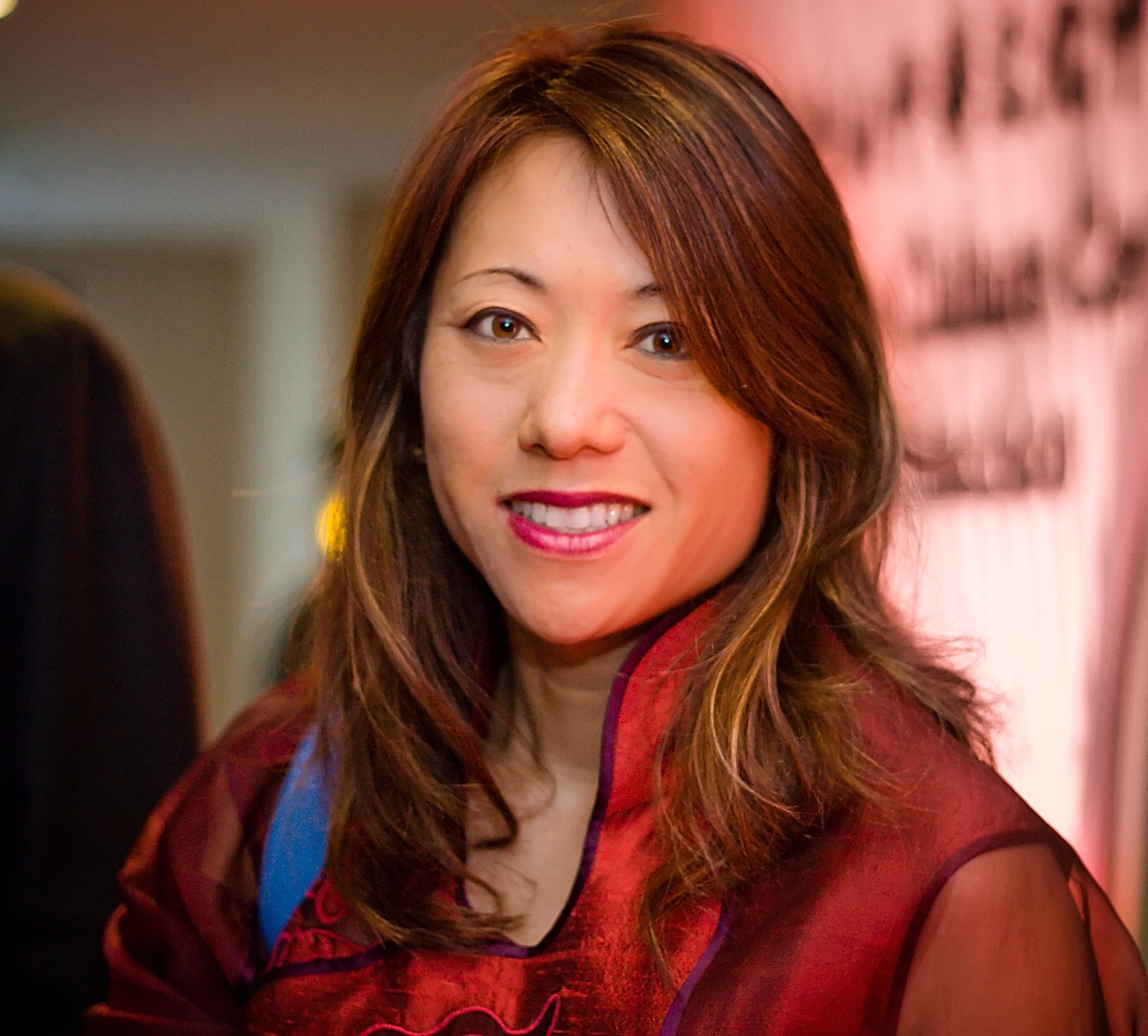
Fiona Ma, MS '93, 34th Treasurer of California and former member of the California State Assembly

== See also ==
- List of colleges and universities in California
- List of business schools in the United States
