= Diana Becton =

Contra Costa County District Attorney (born 1951)

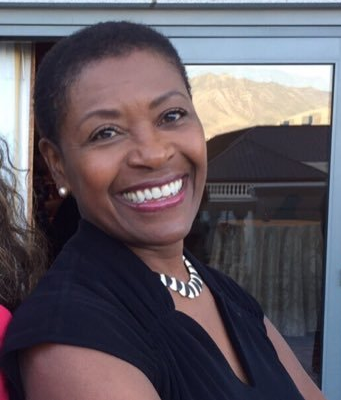

District Attorney of Contra Costa County
- Incumbent
- Assumed office September 18, 2017
- Preceded by: Mark Peterson

Personal details
- Born: August 16, 1951 (age 75)
- Party: Democratic
- Education: San Francisco State University (BA); Golden Gate University (JD); Pacific School of Religion (MTS)

Diana Becton, also known as Diana Becton Smith (born August 16, 1951), is a former trial judge and is currently both the first woman and first African American to be elected district attorney in the history of Contra Costa County in California.

== Education and early career ==
Becton attended Oakland public schools. She received a B.A. in Economics from San Francisco State University and a J.D. from Golden Gate University School of Law. Becton worked as a Housing Finance & Development Supervisor for the city of Richmond from 1979 to 1987. Becton worked in private practice from 1987 to 1995.

Becton was appointed to the Contra Costa County Superior Court in 1995 by then Governor Pete Wilson. In 2011, she was elected by her colleagues to be the presiding judge, in charge of court administration.

Becton has a Master's degree in Theology from the Pacific School of Religion.

Becton was admitted to the State Bar of California on December 11, 1986, and her attorney status is active. She became a judge on November 28, 1995, where she served for 22 years on the Contra Costa County Superior Court.

== Contra Costa County District Attorney ==
On June 14, 2017, Contra Costa County District Attorney Mark Peterson resigned in a plea deal with the Attorney General of California's office, relating to the improper use of campaign funds for personal expenditures.

The Contra Costa County Board of Supervisors reviewed applications and chose Becton out of 12 applicants and five finalists to serve the remainder of the unexpired term. In her application, Becton said that she would pursue criminal justice reform issues such as bail reform. Becton's supporters praised her community involvement and her work helping former prisoners integrate back into society. During the selection process, an anonymous letter accused Becton of plagiarism in her written application for the District Attorney position. Becton admitted to copying material and said that she did not intend to present the ideas as her original thoughts. Becton was sworn on September 18, 2017.

Becton ran for election for a full term for District Attorney. In the June 2018 primary election, Becton won a majority of the vote, winning the contest outright and pre-empting a November runoff. The Mercury News noted that her election victory made her "the first African-American and first woman to be elected DA in the office’s roughly 160-year history". Becton's campaign received support from a consortium of social justice groups, Democratic activists, and wealthy funders including George Soros.

In 2019, Becton established a conviction integrity unit to review wrongful convictions. The unit moved to dismiss three convictions that relied on the uncorroborated testimony of a police officer who was accused of misconduct. The misconduct came to light after a new state law, SB 1421, made certain police records accessible to public records requests.

On July 7, 2020, Becton charged two residents of Contra Costa with a hate crime for allegedly defacing a Black Lives Matter mural.

In April 2021, Becton's office filed charges against former Danville Police Officer Andrew Hall, for the 2018 killing of Laudemer Arboleda while on duty. Becton said that Hall used "unreasonable and unnecessary force" when he shot Arboleda during an attempted traffic stop. A jury convicted Hall for assault with a deadly weapon, and deadlocked on the charge for voluntary manslaughter. In March 2022, Hall was sentenced to six years in prison.

In September 2021, Becton's office declined to file charges against the driver who killed Greg Knapp as he was biking. According to San Ramon Police, the investigation found that the primary cause of the crash was an unsafe lane change, with a secondary cause being driver inattention from glancing at their phone. Becton's office stated that "there is insufficient evidence to satisfy the requisite standard of criminal negligence on the part of the suspect driver."

In the June 2022 election, Becton secured a majority of the vote and won re-election, defeating opponent Mary Knox. Columnist Mark Z. Babarak wrote that Becton successfully campaigned on both public safety and criminal justice reform. Becton was able to win while Chesa Boudin, another progressive District Attorney in the Bay Area, lost his election. In an interview after the election, Becton noted that her campaign's messaging on a) public safety and b) accountability for public officials and police officers resonated the most with voters. Becton declined to opine on Boudin's campaign performance.

=== Personal Issues ===
In July 2019, Chief Deputy District Attorney Phyllis Redmond resigned, citing disagreements in management style. Redmond said that Becton did not seek input from prosecutors on key decisions around changes to the state's murder law, leading to the freeing of a prisoner after their murder conviction was overturned. Redmond joined at least 12 staff attorneys out of about 90 who had resigned in the prior six months. The report suggested that staff members in the District Attorney's office resisted Becton's progressive reforms and progressive changes to state law that seek more alternatives to traditional "tough on crime" measures.

In 2019, Deputy District Attorney Mary Knox filed a complaint of retaliation against Becton. According to Knox, Becton demoted Knox after learning that Knox supported Becton's opponent in the 2018 election. The merit board sent the case before an administrative law judge, who recommended that Becton had not committed political retaliation. In 2021, the Contra Costa Merit Board rejected the recommendation, and some board members cast doubt on sworn statements made by Becton and her chief deputy. Knox ran against Becton for District Attorney in 2022.

In February 2020, four women deputy district attorneys sued Becton in federal court for gender and age discrimination, alleging they were demoted and passed up for promotions.

== Personal life ==
Becton grew up in East Oakland. She resides in El Sobrante, California.

In 2020, Becton married Dr. Alvin Bernstine, a pastor. Becton received criticism for hosting an outdoor wedding at her home in August 2020, when the county had placed restrictions on gatherings to combat the COVID-19 pandemic. Becton said she consulted with the county health services and that "I did everything that I knew possible to obtain the best information".

== See also ==
- List of African-American jurists
- List of district attorneys by county
