= List of district attorneys in the United States =

This is a list of US state-level prosecutors, often known as district attorneys. In states which hold partisan elections for prosecutorial positions, the party affiliation of each prosecutor is noted.

Delaware and Rhode Island are the only U.S. states without locally elected or independently operated attorney offices; instead, all criminal prosecutions are centralized under the state attorney general.

== Alabama ==
District attorneys in Alabama are assigned by circuit. There are 41 circuits in the state.

Circuit	Counties	District Attorney
1	Choctaw, Clarke, Washington	Stephen K. Winters (R)
2	Butler, Crenshaw, Lowndes	Charlotte M. Tesmer (D)
3	Barbour, Bullock	Ben C. Reeves, Jr. (D)
4	Bibb, Dallas, Hale, Perry, Wilcox	Robert H. Turner Jr. (D)
5	Chambers, Macon, Randolph, Tallapoosa	Mike Segrest (R)
6	Tuscaloosa	Robert Hays Webb (R)
7	Calhoun, Cleburne	C. Lynn Hammond (R)
8	Morgan	R. Scott Anderson (R)
9	Cherokee, DeKalb	Summer M. Summerford (R)
10	Jefferson	Lynneice O. Washington (Bessemer Division) (D); Danny Carr (Birmingham Division) (D)
11	Lauderdale	Christopher E. Connolly (R)
12	Coffee, Pike	James Tarbox (R)
13	Mobile	Keith Blackwood (R)
14	Walker	William R. "Bill" Adair (R)
15	Montgomery	Azzie M. Oliver (D)
16	Etowah	Joseph "Jody" Willoughby (R)
17	Greene, Marengo, Sumter	Gregory S. "Greg" Griggers (D)
18	Shelby	Matt Casey (R)
19	Autauga, Chilton, Elmore	C.J. Robinson (R)
20	Henry, Houston	Russ Goodman (R)
21	Escambia	Stephen M. "Steve" Billy (R)
22	Covington	Walter M. "Walt" Merrell, III (R)
23	Madison	Robert L. "Rob" Broussard (R)
24	Fayette, Lamar, Pickens	Andy Hamlin (R)
25	Marion, Winston	Scott A. Slatton (R)
26	Russell	Rick Chancey (D)
27	Marshall	Jennifer Bray (R)
28	Baldwin	Robert E. "Bob" Wilters (R)
29	Talladega	Steven D. Giddens (R)
30	St. Clair	Lyle Harmon (R)
31	Colbert	Hal Hughston (R)
32	Cullman	Champ Crocker (R)
33	Dale, Geneva	T. Kirke Adams (R)
34	Franklin	Jeff Barksdale (R)
35	Conecuh, Monroe	Todd Watson (D)
36	Lawrence	Errek P. Jett (R)
37	Lee	Jessica Ventiere (R)
38	Jackson	Jason R. Pierce (R)
39	Limestone	Brian C.T. Jones (R)
40	Clay, Coosa	Joseph D. Ficquette (R)
41	Blount	Pamela L. Casey (R)

== Alaska ==
District attorneys in Alaska are based on the locations of district courts. Some districts share district attorneys, however. Alaskan district attorneys are appointed by the Alaska Attorney General, currently Treg Taylor.

District	District Attorney
Anchorage/Dillingham	Brittany L. Dunlop
Bethel	Mark Clark
Fairbanks/Utqiagvik	Joseph B. Dallaire
Juneau/Sitka	Jessalyn Gillum
Kenai	Scot H. Leaders
Ketchikan	Alex Kramarczuk
Kodiak	Gustaf W. Olson
Kotzebue/Nome	John A. Earthman
Palmer	Trina M. Sears

== Arizona ==
Each county in Arizona has its own prosecutor, called a county attorney.

County	Attorney
Apache	Michael D. Whiting (D)
Cochise	Brian McIntyre (R)
Coconino	Bill Ring (D)
Gila	Bradley Beauchamp (R)
Graham	Scott Bennett (R)
Greenlee	Gary Griffith (R)
La Paz	Rachel Shackelford (R)
Maricopa	Rachel Mitchell (R)
Mohave	Matthew Smith (R)
Navajo	Brad Carlyon (D)
Pima	Laura Conover (D)
Pinal	Kent Volkmer (R)
Santa Cruz	George Silva (D)
Yavapai	Dennis M. McGrane (R)
Yuma	Karolyn Kaczorowski (D)

== Arkansas ==
District attorneys are assigned to Arkansas's 23 judicial circuits. Arkansas's prosecutors are known as Prosecuting Attorneys. Their elections are non-partisan.

Judicial Circuit	County(ies)	Prosecuting Attorney
1st	Cross, Lee, Monroe, Phillips, St. Francis, Woodruff	Todd Murray
2nd	Clay, Craighead, Crittenden, Greene, Mississippi, Poinsett	Scott Ellington
3rd	Jackson, Lawrence, Randolph, Sharp	Devon Holder
4th	Madison, Washington	Brandon Carter
5th	Franklin, Johnson, Pope	Jeff Phillips
6th	Perry, Pulaski	William Jones
7th	Grant, Hot Spring	Teresa Howell
8th–North	Hempstead, Nevada	Ben Hale
8th–South	Lafayette, Miller	Connie Mitchell
9th–East	Clark	Dan Turner
9th–West	Howard, Little River, Pike, Sevier	Jana Bradford
10th	Ashley, Bradley, Chicot, Desha, Drew	Frank Spain
11th–East	Arkansas	Tim Blair
11th–West	Jefferson, Lincoln	Kyle Hunter
12th	Sebastian	Daniel Shue
13th	Calhoun, Cleveland, Columbia, Dallas, Ouachita, Union	Jeff Rogers
14th	Baxter, Boone, Marion, Newton	David Ethredge
15th	Conway, Logan, Scott, Yell	Tom Tatum II
16th	Cleburne, Fulton, Independence, Izard, Stone	Drew Smith
17th	Prairie, White	Rebecca Reed McCoy
18th–East	Garland	Michelle C. Lawrence
18th–West	Montgomery, Polk	Debra Wood Buschman
19th–East	Carroll	Tony Rogers
19th–West	Benton	Bryan Sexton
20th	Faulkner, Searcy, Van Buren	Carol Crews
21st	Crawford	Kevin Holmes
22nd	Saline	Chris Walton
23rd	Lonoke	Chuck Graham

== California ==
Each county in California has its own prosecutor, known as a district attorney. Their elections are non-partisan.

County	District Attorney	First Year
Alameda	Ursula Jones Dickson	2025
Alpine	Robert Priscaro	2022
Amador	Todd Riebe	1998
Butte	Michael L. Ramsey	1987
Calaveras	Barbara Yook	2010
Colusa	Matthew R. Beauchamp	2016
Contra Costa	Diana Becton	2017
Del Norte	Katherine Micks	2013
El Dorado	Vernon Pierson	2006
Fresno	Lisa Smittcamp	2014
Glenn	Dwayne Stewart	2015
Humboldt	Stacey Eads	2022
Imperial	George Marquez	2023
Inyo	Dana M. Crom	2025
Kern	Cynthia Zimmer	2019
Kings	Sarah Hacker	2023
Lake	Susan Krones	2019
Lassen	S. Melyssah Rios	2019
Los Angeles	Nathan Hochman	2024
Madera	Sally O. Moreno	2018
Marin	Lori Frugoli	2019
Mariposa	Walter Wall	2025
Mendocino	C. David Eyster	2011
Merced	Nicole Silveira	2022
Modoc	Nina Salarno	2024
Mono	David Anderson	2023
Monterey	Jeannine M. Pacioni	2018
Napa	Allison Haley	2016
Nevada	Jesse Wilson	2021
Orange	Todd Spitzer	2019
Placer	Morgan Gire	2020
Plumas	David Hollister	2011
Riverside	Michael Hestrin	2015
Sacramento	Thien Ho	2023
San Benito	Joel Buckingham	2023
San Bernardino	Jason Anderson	2019
San Diego	Summer Stephan	2017
San Francisco	Brooke Jenkins	2022
San Joaquin	Ron Freitas	2021
San Luis Obispo	Dan Dow	2014
San Mateo	Stephen M. Wagstaffe	2011
Santa Barbara	John Savrnoch	2023
Santa Clara	Jeffrey Rosen	2011
Santa Cruz	Jeff Rosell	2018
Shasta	Stephanie A. Bridgett	2017
Sierra	Sandra Groven	2019
Siskiyou	James Kirk Andrus	2005
Solano	Krishna A. Abrams	2014
Sonoma	Carla Rodriguez	2023
Stanislaus	Jeff Laugero	2023
Sutter	Jennifer Dupre	2023
Tehama	Matthew Rogers	2019
Trinity	David Brady	2023
Tulare	Tim Ward	2012
Tuolumne	Cassandra Jenecke	2021
Ventura	Erik Nasarenko	2021
Yolo	Jeffrey Reisig	2007
Yuba	Clint Curry	2019

== Colorado ==
District attorneys are assigned to each of Colorado's 22 judicial districts.

District	Counties	District Attorney
1st	Gilpin, Jefferson	Alexis King (D)
2nd	Denver	John F. Walsh (D)
3rd	Huerfano, Las Animas	Nicholas Dale (D)
4th	El Paso, Teller	Michael Allen (R)
5th	Clear Creek, Eagle, Lake, Summit	Heidi McCollum (D)
6th	Archuleta, La Plata, San Juan	Sean P. Murray (D)
7th	Delta, Gunnison, Hinsdale, Montrose, Ouray, San Miguel	Anna Cooling (R)
8th	Jackson, Larimer	Gordon McLaughlin (D)
9th	Garfield, Pitkin, Rio Blanco	Jefferson Cheney (R)
10th	Pueblo	Kala Beauvais (R)
11th	Chaffee, Custer, Fremont, Park	Linda Stanley (R)
12th	Alamosa, Conejos, Costilla, Mineral, Rio Grande, Saguache	Anne Kelly (R)
13th	Kit Carson, Logan, Morgan, Phillips, Sedgwick, Washington, Yuma	Travis Sides (R)
14th	Grand, Moffat, Routt	Matthew Karzen (Ind.)
15th	Baca, Cheyenne, Kiowa, Prowers	Joshua Vogel (R)
16th	Bent, Crowley, Otero	William Culver (R)
17th	Adams, Broomfield	Brian Mason (D)
18th	Arapahoe, Douglas, Elbert, Lincoln	George Brauchler (R)
19th	Weld	Michael J. Rourke (R)
20th	Boulder	Michael Dougherty (D)
21st	Mesa	Daniel P. Rubenstein (R)
22nd	Dolores, Montezuma	Jeremy Reed (R)

== Connecticut ==
Prosecutors in Connecticut are known as state's attorneys. Each judicial district is assigned its own state's attorney. They are appointed by a state commission.

District	State's Attorney
Ansonia/Milford	Margaret E. Kelley
Danbury	David R. Applegate
Fairfield/Bridgeport	Joseph T. Corradino
Hartford	Sharmese L. Walcott
Litchfield	David Shannon
Middlesex	Michael A. Gailor
New Britain	Christian M. Watson
New Haven	John P. Doyle, Jr
New London	Paul J. Narducci
Stamford/Norwalk	Paul J. Ferenck
Tolland	Matthew C. Gedansky
Waterbury	Maureen Platt
Windham	Anne F. Mahoney

== Delaware ==
All prosecutions in the state of Delaware are handled by the Attorney General of Delaware. The current Attorney General is Kathy Jennings (D).

== Florida ==
Map of Florida's judicial circuits

Florida prosecutors are known as state attorneys and are assigned by circuit.

Circuit	Location	Counties	State Attorney
1st	Pensacola	Escambia, Okaloosa, Santa Rosa, Walton	Ginger B. Madden
2nd	Tallahassee	Franklin, Gadsden, Jefferson, Leon, Liberty, Wakulla	Jack Campbell
3rd	Lake City	Columbia, Dixie, Hamilton, Lafayette, Madison, Suwannee, Taylor	John Durrett
4th	Jacksonville	Clay, Duval, Nassau	Melissa Nelson
5th	Ocala	Citrus, Hernando, Lake, Marion, Sumter	William Gladson
6th	Clearwater	Pasco, Pinellas	Bruce Bartlett
7th	Daytona	Flagler, Putnam, St. Johns, Volusia	R.J. Larizza
8th	Gainesville	Alachua, Baker, Bradford, Gilchrist, Levy, Union	Brian Kramer
9th	Orlando	Orange, Osceola	Monique Worrell
10th	Lakeland	Hardee, Highlands, Polk	Brian Haas
11th	Miami	Miami-Dade	Katherine Fernandez Rundle
12th	Sarasota	DeSoto, Manatee, Sarasota	Ed Brodsky
13th	Tampa	Hillsborough	Susan Lopez
14th	Panama City	Bay, Calhoun, Gulf, Holmes, Jackson, Washington	Larry Basford
15th	West Palm Beach	Palm Beach	Alexcia Cox
16th	Key West	Monroe	Dennis Ward
17th	Ft. Lauderdale	Broward	Harold Pryor
18th	Melbourne	Brevard, Seminole	Will Scheiner
19th	Ft. Pierce	Indian River, Martin, Okeechobee, St. Lucie	Thomas Bakkedahl
20th	Ft. Myers	Charlotte, Collier, Glades, Hendry, Lee	Amira Fox

== Georgia ==
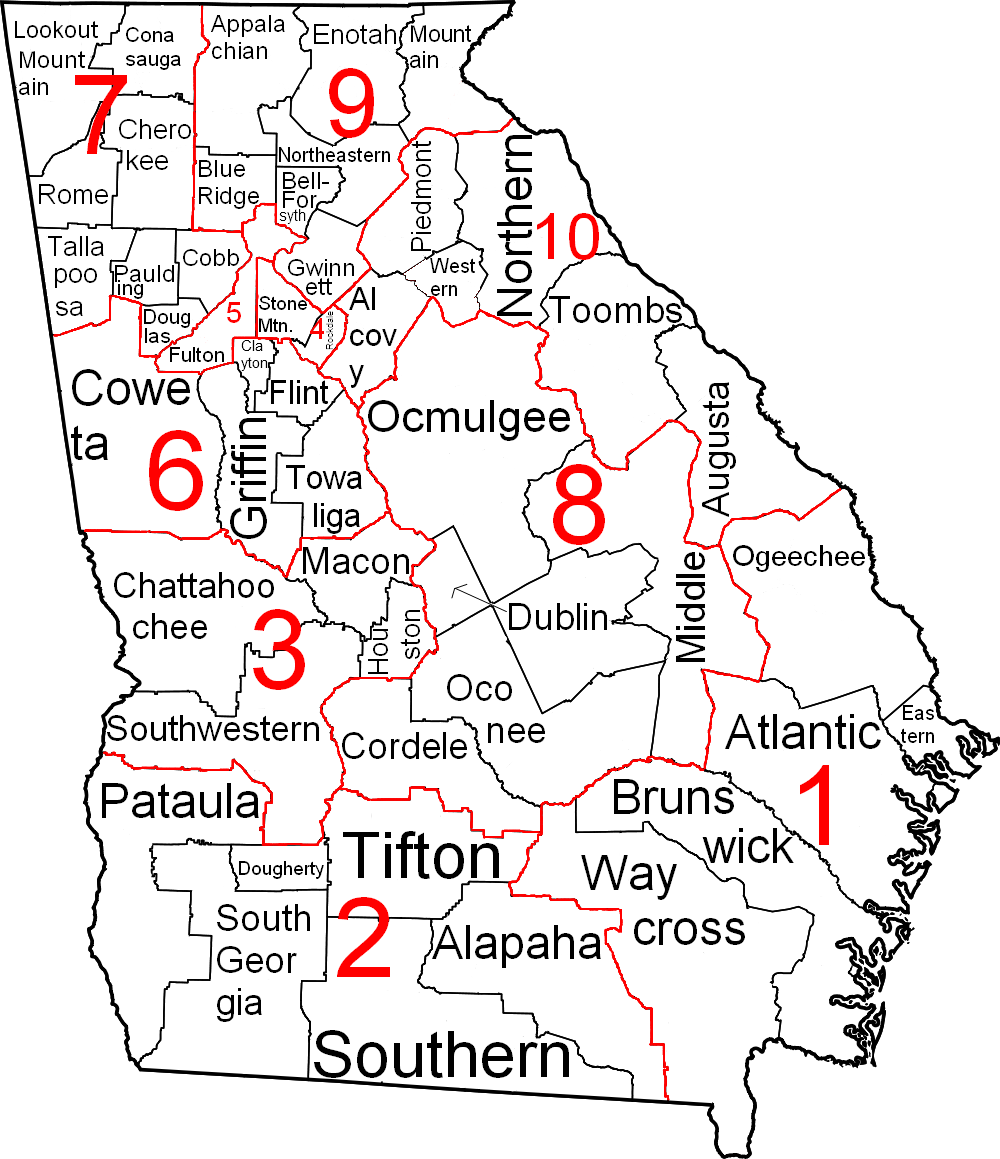
Map of Georgia judicial districts and circuits

District attorneys in Georgia are assigned to its 50 circuits.

Circuit	Counties	District Attorney
Alapaha	Atkinson, Berrien, Clinch, Cook, Lanier	Chase L. Studstill (R)
Alcovy	Newton, Walton	Randal Matthew McGinley (R)
Appalachian	Fannin, Gilmer, Pickens	Frank Wood (R)
Atlanta	Fulton	Fani T. Willis (D)
Atlantic	Bryan, Evans, Liberty, Long, McIntosh, Tattnall	Billy Joe Nelson Jr. (R)
Augusta	Burke, Richmond	Jared T. Williams (D)
Bell-Forsyth	Forsyth	Penny A. Penn (R)
Blue Ridge	Cherokee	Susan K. Treadaway (R)
Brunswick	Appling, Camden, Glynn, Jeff Davis, Wayne	Keith Higgins (R)
Chattahoochee	Chattahoochee, Harris, Marion, Muscogee, Talbot, Taylor	Don Kelly (R)
Cherokee	Bartow, Gordon	Erle J. Newton, III (R)
Clayton		Tasha M. Mosley (D)
Cobb		Sonya F. Allen (D)
Columbia		Bobby Christine (R)
Conasauga	Murray, Whitfield	Benjamin Kenemer (R)
Cordele	Ben Hill, Crisp, Dooly, Wilcox	Brad Rigby (R)
Coweta	Coweta, Meriwether, Troup	Herb Cranford (R)
DeKalb		Sherry Boston (D)
Dougherty		Gregory W. Edwards (D)
Douglas		Dalia Racine (D)
Dublin	Johnson, Laurens, Treutlen, Twiggs	Harold D. McLendon (R)
Eastern	Chatham	Shalena Cook-Jones (D)
Enotah	Lumpkin, Towns, Union, White	Jeff Langley (R)
Flint	Henry	Darius Pattillo (D)
Griffin	Fayette, Pike, Spalding, Upson	Marie Greene Broder (R)
Gwinnett		Patsy Austin-Gatson (D)
Houston		Eric Z. Edwards (R)
Lookout Mountain	Catoosa, Chattooga, Dade, Walker	Clayton Fuller (R)
Macon	Bibb, Crawford, Peach	Anita Reynolds Howard (D)
Middle	Candler, Emanuel, Jefferson, Toombs, Washington	Tripp Fitzner (R)
Mountain	Banks, Habersham, Rabun, Stephens	George R. Christian (R)
Northeastern	Dawson, Hall	Lee Darragh (R)
Northern	Elbert, Franklin, Hart, Madison, Oglethorpe	D. Parks White (R)
Ocmulgee	Baldwin, Greene, Hancock, Jasper, Jones, Morgan, Putnam, Wilkinson	T. Wright Barksdale (R)
Oconee	Bleckley, Dodge, Montgomery, Pulaski, Telfair, Wheeler	Timothy G. Vaughn (R)
Ogeechee	Bulloch, Effingham, Jenkins, Screven	Robert Busbee (R)
Pataula	Clay, Early, Miller, Quitman, Randolph, Seminole, Terrell	Richard "Vic" McNease (R)
Paulding		Matthew Rollins (R)
Piedmont	Barrow, Jackson	J. Bradley Smith (R)
Rockdale		Alisha Johnson (D)
Rome	Floyd	Leigh E. Patterson (R)
South Georgia	Baker, Calhoun, Decatur, Grady, Mitchell	Joe Mulholland (R)
Southern	Brooks, Colquitt, Echols, Lowndes, Thomas	Brad Shealy (R)
Southwestern	Lee, Macon, Schley, Stewart, Sumter, Webster	Lewis R. Lamb (Ind.)
Tallapoosa	Haralson, Polk	Jaeson Robert Smith (R)
Tifton	Irwin, Tift, Turner, Worth	Bryce Johnson (R)
Toombs	Glascock, Lincoln, McDuffie, Taliaferro, Warren, Wilkes	Bill Doupe (D)
Towaliga	Butts, Lamar, Monroe	Jonathan L. Adams (R)
Waycross	Bacon, Brantley, Charlton, Coffee, Pierce, Ware	Marilyn Bennett (R)
West Georgia	Carroll, Heard	Sarah Japour (Ind.)
Western	Clarke, Oconee	Kalki Yalamanchili (Ind.)

== Hawaii ==
Hawaii's prosecuting attorneys are assigned by county. Those in Hawaii, Honolulu, and Kauai Counties are elected on a non-partisan basis, while Maui's is appointed.

County	Prosecuting Attorney
Hawaii	Kelden B. A. Waltjen
Honolulu	Steven S. Alm
Kauaʻi	Rebecca Like
Maui	Andrew Martin

== Idaho ==
Prosecuting attorneys in Idaho are assigned by county.

County	Prosecuting Attorney
Ada	Jan Bennetts (R)
Adams	Chris Boyd (R)
Bannock	Ian Johnson (R)
Bear Lake	Joseph Hayes (R)
Benewah	Brian Thie (R)
Bingham	Paul Rogers (R)
Blaine	Matthew Fredback (D)
Boise	Adam Strong (R)
Bonner	Louis Marshall (R)
Bonneville	Daniel Clark (R)
Boundary	Andrakay J. Pluid (R)
Butte	Steve Stephens (R)
Camas	Jim Thomas (R)
Canyon	Bryan Taylor (R)
Caribou	S. Doug Wood (R)
Cassia	McCord Larsen (R)
Clark	Craig Simpson (R)
Clearwater	Clayne Tyler (R)
Custer	Justin Oleson (R)
Elmore	Daniel Page (R)
Franklin	Vic Pearson (R)
Fremont	Lindsey A. Blake (R)
Gem	Erick Thomson (R)
Gooding	Trevor Misseldine (R)
Idaho	Kirk MacGregor (R)
Jefferson	Mark Taylor (R)
Jerome	Michael J. Seib (R)
Kootenai	Barry McHugh (R)
Latah	Bill Thompson (D)
Lemhi	Bruce Withers (R)
Lewis	Zachary Pall (Ind.)
Lincoln	Richard Roats (R)
Madison	Rob H. Wood (R)
Minidoka	Lance Stevenson (R)
Nez Perce	Justin Coleman (Ind.)
Oneida	Cody Brower (R)
Owyhee	Jeffrey Phillips (R)
Payette	Mike Duke (R)
Power	Anson Call (R)
Shoshone	Benjamin J. Allen (R)
Teton	Bailey Smith (R)
Twin Falls	Grant Loebs (R)
Valley	Brian Naugle (R)
Washington	Delton Walker (R)

== Illinois ==
Illinois prosecutors are known as state's attorneys. They are assigned by county.

County	State's Attorney
Adams	Gary Farha (R)
Alexander	Erik Zachary Gowin (D)
Bond	Dora Mann (D)
Boone	Tricia L. Smith (R)
Brown	Michael Hill (R)
Bureau	Daniel C. Anderson (R)
Calhoun	Lucas Fanning (R)
Carroll	Scott Brinkmeier (R)
Cass	Craig Miller (R)
Champaign	Julia Rietz (D)
Christian	John H. McWard (R)
Clark	Kyle Hutson (R)
Clay	Andrew Koester (R)
Clinton	Doug Gruenke (R)
Coles	Jesse Danley (R)
Cook	Eileen O'Neill Burke (D)
Crawford	Cole Shaner (R)
Cumberland	Bryan Robbins (R)
DeKalb	Rick Amato (R)
DeWitt	Dan Markwell (R)
Douglas	Kate Watson (R)
DuPage	Robert Berlin (R)
Edgar	Mark R. Isaf (R)
Edwards	Eric St. Ledger (R)
Effingham	Bryan Kibler (R)
Fayette	Joshua Morrison (R)
Ford	Andrew L. Killian (R)
Franklin	Abigail D. Dinn (R)
Fulton	Justin Jochums (D)
Gallatin	Douglas E. Dyhrkopp (D)
Greene	Caleb Briscoe (R)
Grundy	Jason Helland (R)
Hamilton	Justin E. Hood (D)
Hancock	Rachel Bloom Mast (R)
Hardin	Todd Bittle (R)
Henderson	Colby G. Hathaway (R)
Henry	Catherine Runty (R)
Iroquois	James Devine (R)
Jackson	Joe Cervantez (R)
Jasper	Chad Miller (R)
Jefferson	Sean Featherstun (R)
Jersey	Benjamin L. Goetten (Ind.)
Jo Daviess	Christopher Allendorf (R)
Johnson	Tambra Cain Sharp (R)
Kane	Jamie Mosser (D)
Kankakee	Jim Rowe (D)
Kendall	Eric Weis (R)
Knox	Ashley Worby (R)
Lake	Eric Rinehart (D)
LaSalle	Joseph Navarro (D)
Lawrence	Michael M. Strange (R)
Lee	Charles Boonstra (R)
Livingston	Randy Yedniak (R)
Logan	Bradley Hauge (R)
Macon	Scott A. Rueter (R)
Macoupin	Jordan Garrison (D)
Madison	Tom Haine (R)
Marion	Tim Hudspeth (R)
Marshall	Patrick Murphy (R)
Mason	Zachary A. Bryant (D)
Massac	Josh Stratemeyer (R)
McDonough	Matt Kwacala (R)
McHenry	Randi Freese (R)
McLean	Don Knapp (R)
Menard	Gabe Grosboll (R)
Mercer	Grace Simpson (R)
Monroe	Lucas Liefer (R)
Montgomery	Andrew Affrunti (R)
Morgan	Gray Herndon Noll (R)
Moultrie	Tracy L. Weaver (R)
Ogle	Eric Morrow (R)
Peoria	Jodi Hoos (D)
Perry	David Searby (R)
Piatt	Sarah Perry (R)
Pike	Zachary P. Boren (R)
Pope	Jason Olson (R)
Pulaski	Lisa Casper (R)
Putnam	Christina Mennie (R)
Randolph	Christopher Koeneman (R)
Richland	John A. Clark (R)
Rock Island	Dora Villarreal-Nieman (D)
Saline	Molly Wilson Kasiar (R)
Sangamon	Dan Wright (R)
Schuyler	Charles Laegeler (R)
Scott	Richard J. Crews (R)
Shelby	Nichole Kroncke (R)
St. Clair	James Gomric (D)
Stark	Austin King (R)
Stephenson	Carl Larson (R)
Tazewell	Kevin Johnson (R)
Union	Tyler Tripp (R)
Vermilion	Jacqueline Lacy (R)
Wabash	Kelly Storckman (R)
Warren	Thomas Siegel (R)
Washington	Daniel Jankowski (R)
Wayne	Kevin Kakac (R)
White	Denton Aud (R)
Whiteside	Colleen Buckwalter (R)
Will	James Glasgow (D)
Williamson	Ted Hampson (R)
Winnebago	J. Hanley (R)
Woodford	Gregory Minger (R)

== Indiana ==
Indiana's prosecutors, known as prosecuting attorneys, are elected to the state's 91 judicial circuits. Each circuit, with one exception, covers a single county.

County/Counties	Circuit	Prosecuting Attorney
Adams	26	Jeremy W. Brown (R)
Allen	38	Mike McAlexander (R)
Bartholomew	9	Lindsey Holden-Kay (R)
Benton	76	Rex Kepner (R)
Blackford	71	Joelle Freiburger (R)
Boone	20	Kent T. Eastwood (R)
Brown	88	Theodore F. Adams (R)
Carroll	74	Nicholas C. McLeland (R)
Cass	29	Noah Schafer (R)
Clark	4	Jeremy T. Mull (R)
Clay	13	Emily Clarke (R)
Clinton	45	Anthony J. Sommer (R)
Crawford	77	Chase Smith (R)
Daviess	49	Daniel S. Murrie (R)
Dearborn & Ohio	7	Lynn M. Deddens (R)
Decatur	69	Nathan W. Harter IV (R)
DeKalb	75	Neal R. Blythe (R)
Delaware	46	Eric M. Hoffman (D)
Dubois	57	Beth E. Schroeder (R)
Elkhart	34	Vicki Elaine Becker (R)
Fayette	73	Bette J. Jones (R)
Floyd	52	Chris Lane (R)
Fountain	61	Daniel L. Askren (R)
Franklin	37	Christopher Huerkamp (R)
Fulton	41	Michael T. Marrs (R)
Gibson	66	Michael R. Cochren (R)
Grant	48	Scott J. Hunt (R)
Greene	63	Jarrod D. Holtsclaw (R)
Hamilton	24	Greg Garrison (R)
Hancock	18	Brent E. Eaton (R)
Harrison	3	J. Otto Schalk (R)
Hendricks	55	Loren P. Delp (R)
Henry	53	Michael J. Mahoney (R)
Howard	62	Mark A. McCann (R)
Huntington	56	Jeremy K. Nix (R)
Jackson	40	Jeffrey A. Chalfant (R)
Jasper	30	Jacob Taulman (R)
Jay	58	Wesley A. Schemenaur (D)
Jefferson	5	David R. Sutter (D)
Jennings	86	Brian J. Belding (R)
Johnson	8	Lance Hamner (R)
Knox	12	J. Dirk Carnahan (R)
Kosciusko	54	J. Brad Voelz (R)
LaGrange	35	Travis J. Glick (R)
Lake	31	Bernard A. Crater (D)
LaPorte	32	Sean Fagan (R)
Lawrence	81	Samuel C. Arp II (R)
Madison	50	Rodney J. Cummings (R)
Marion	19	Ryan Mears (D)
Marshall	72	E. Nelson Chipman, Jr. (R)
Martin	90	Aureola S. Vincz (R)
Miami	51	Jeff Sinkovics (R)
Monroe	10	Erika Oliphant (D)
Montgomery	22	Joseph R. Buser (R)
Morgan	15	Steven P. Sonnega (R)
Newton	79	Jeffrey D. Drinski (R)
Noble	33	James B. Mowrey (R)
Orange	87	Holly N. Hudelson (R)
Owen	78	Benjamin C. Kim (R)
Parke	68	Steve A. Cvengros (R)
Perry	70	Samantha Hurst (D)
Pike	83	Darrin E. McDonald (R)
Porter	67	Gary S. Gerrmann (D)
Posey	11	Thomas Clowers (R)
Pulaski	59	Kelly M. Gaumer (R)
Putnam	64	Timothy L. Bookwalter (R)
Randolph	25	David M. Daly (R)
Ripley	80	Richard J. Hertel (R)
Rush	65	Philip J. Caviness (R)
St. Joseph	60	Kenneth P. Cotter (D)
Scott	6	Chris A. Owens (D)
Shelby	16	James B. "Brad" Landwerlen (R)
Spencer	84	Megan Bennet (R)
Starke	44	Leslie A. Baker (R)
Steuben	85	Jeremy T. Musser (R)
Sullivan	14	Ann Smith Mischler (R)
Switzerland	91	Ryan Marshall (R)
Tippecanoe	23	Patrick K. Harrington (R)
Tipton	36	Jay D. Rich (R)
Union	89	Andrew "A.J." Bryson (D)
Vanderburgh	1	Diana Moers (R)
Vermillion	47	Bruce D. Aukerman (D)
Vigo	43	Terry R. Modesitt (R)
Wabash	27	William C. Hartley, Jr. (R)
Warren	21	Bonnie J. Adams (R)
Warrick	2	Michael J. Perry (R)
Washington	42	Tara Coats Hunt (R)
Wayne	17	Michael W. Shipman (R)
Wells	28	Colin Z. Andrews (R)
White	39	Mark A. Delgado (R)
Whitley	82	Daniel J. Sigler, Jr. (R)

== Iowa ==
Iowa's prosecutors are known as county attorneys. Two county attorneys serve two counties, while the rest serve one.

County	County Attorney
Adair	Melissa Larson (D)
Adams	Andrew Knuth (R)
Allamakee	Anthony Gericke (R)
Appanoose	Susan Scieszinski Cole (R)
Audubon	Christopher R. Swensen (D)
Benton	Ray Lough (R)
Black Hawk	Brian Williams (D)
Boone	Matthew John Speers (R)
Bremer	Darius P. R. Robinson (R)
Buchanan	Shawn M. Harden (D)
Buena Vista	Paul Allen (R)
Butler	Dave Kuehner (R)
Calhoun	Tina Meth-Farrington (R)
Carroll	John C. Werden (R)
Cass	Vanessa Strazdas (R)
Cedar	Adam Blank (R)
Cerro Gordo	Carlyle D. Dalen (D)
Cherokee	Ryan Kolpin (R)
Chickasaw	David C. Launder (R)
Clarke	Adam Ramsey (R)
Clay	Travis S. Johnson (D)
Clayton	Zach Herrmann (R)
Clinton	Mike Wolf (R)
Crawford	Colin Johnson (D)
Dallas	Chuck Sinnard (R)
Davis	Rick Lynch (D)
Decatur	Lisa Hynden Jeanes (Ind.)
Delaware	John Burneau (R)
Des Moines	Lisa Schaefer (D)
Dickinson	Amy E. Zenor (R)
Dubuque	Scott Nelson (R)
Emmet	Melanie Summers Bauer (R)
Fayette	Nathan Lein (D)
Floyd	Richard Ginbey (R)
Franklin	Brent Symens (R)
Fremont	Peter Johnson (D)
Greene	Thomas Laehn (L)
Grundy	Erika L. Allen (R)
Guthrie	Dana R. Minteer (R)
Hamilton	Patrick Chambers (D)
Hancock	Blake H. Norman (R)
Hardin	Darrell Meyer (R)
Harrison	Sarah Delanty (Ind.)
Henry	Darin Stater (R)
Howard	Kevin Schoeberl (R)
Humboldt	Jon Beaty (R)
Ida	Meghann Cosgrove Whitmer (D)
Iowa	Tim McMeen (R)
Jackson	John Leo Kies (R)
Jasper	Scott Nicholson (D)
Jefferson	Chauncey Moulding (D)
Johnson	Rachel Zimmermann Smith (D)
Jones	Kristoffer Lyons (Ind.)
Keokuk	Amber Thompson (R)
Kossuth	Todd Holmes (D)
Lee	Ross Braden (D)
Linn	Nick Maybanks (D)
Louisa	Adam D. Parsons (R)
Lucas	Brandon Shelton (R)
Lyon	Amy Oetken (R)
Madison	Matthew Schultz (R)
Mahaska	Andrew Ritland (R)
Marion	Ed Bull (R)
Marshall	Jordan Gaffney (R)
Mills	Naeda Elliot (R)
Mitchell	Aaron Murphy (Ind.)
Monona	Ian McConeghy (R)
Monroe	Laura Davis (R)
Montgomery	Drew B. Swanson (R)
Muscatine	Jim Barry (R)
O'Brien	Katie Morgan (R)
Osceola	Nolan McGowan (R)
Page	Carl Sonksen (R)
Palo Alto	Peter Hart (D)
Plymouth	Darin J. Raymond (R)
Pocahontas	Daniel Feistner (R)
Polk	Kimberly Graham (D)
Pottawattamie	Matthew Wilber (R)
Poweshiek	Bart Klaver (R)
Ringgold, Taylor	Clinton L. Spurrier (R)
Sac	Ben Smith (R)
Scott	Kelly Cunningham Haan (R)
Shelby	Marcus Gross Jr. (D)
Sioux	Thomas Kunstle (R)
Story	Tim Meals (D)
Tama	Brent D. Heeren (R)
Union	Shane O'Toole (R)
Van Buren	H. Craig Miller (Ind.)
Wapello	Ruben Neff (R)
Warren	Doug Eichholz (R)
Washington	John Gish (R)
Wayne	Alan M. Wilson (R)
Webster	Darren Driscoll (D)
Winnebago	Kelsey Beenken (R)
Winneshiek	Andrew VanDerMaaten (R)
Woodbury	James Loomis (R)
Worth	Jeff Greve (R)
Wright	Eric Simonson (R)

== Kansas ==
Kansas prosecutors are elected by county, although some prosecutors serve multiple counties. Most are called county attorneys, but six are designated as district attorneys.

County	District Attorney
Allen	Jerry B. Hathaway (R)
Anderson, Franklin	Brandon Jones (R)
Atchison	Sherri Becker (R)
Barber	Daniel Lynch (R)
Barton	M. Levi Morris (R)
Bourbon	Jacqie Spradling (R)
Brown	Kevin M. Hill (R)
Butler	Darrin C. Devinney (R)
Chase	William Halvorsen (R)
Chautauqua	Ruth Ritthaler (R)
Cherokee	Jacob Conard (R)
Cheyenne	Leslie Beims (R)
Clark, Comanche	Allison Kuhns (R)
Clay	Richard E. James (R)
Cloud	Robert A. Walsh (D)
Coffey	Wade Bowie (R)
Cowley	Larry Schwartz (R)
Crawford	Michael Gayoso, Jr. (R)
Decatur	Steven W. Hirsch (R)
Dickinson	Andrea Purvis (R)
Doniphan	Charles Baskins (R)
Douglas	Suzanne Valdez (D)
Edwards	Mark Frame (D)
Elk, Greenwood	Jill Ranee Gillett (R)
Ellis	Robert A. Anderson Jr. (R)
Ellsworth	Paul J. Kasper (R)
Finney	Susan Richmeier (R)
Ford	Kevin Salzman (R)
Geary	Krista Blaisdell (R)
Gove	Mark F. Schmiedler (R)
Graham	Jill Elliott (R)
Grant	Jessica Akers (R)
Gray	Curtis E. Campbell (D)
Greeley	Charles F. Moser (D)
Hamilton	Rob Gale (D)
Harper	Daniel P. Martin (R)
Harvey	Heather Figger (R)
Haskell	Lynn Koehn (R)
Hodgeman	Mark Cowell (R)
Jackson	Shawna Miller (R)
Jefferson	Josh Ney (R)
Jewell	Darrell E. Miller (D)
Johnson	Stephen M. Howe (R)
Kearny	Kenny Estes (D)
Kingman	Matthew W. Ricke (R)
Kiowa	Chay Howard (R)
Labette	Stephen Jones (R)
Lane	Dale E. Pike (R)
Leavenworth	Todd Thompson (R)
Lincoln	Jennifer O'Hare (R)
Linn	Burton Harding (R)
Logan	Craig Ulrich (R)
Lyon	James Marcus Goodman (R)
Marion	Joel Ensey (R)
Marshall	Meghan Votacek (R)
McPherson	Gregory T. Benefiel (R)
Meade	Clay Kuhns (R)
Miami	Elizabeth Sweeney-Reeder (R)
Mitchell	Mark Noah (Ind.)
Montgomery	Melissa Johnson (R)
Morris	Laura E. Allen (R)
Morton	Adam Carey (R)
Nemaha	Brad M. Lippert (R)
Neosho	Linus Thuston (R)
Ness	Kevin B. Salzman (R)
Norton, Phillips	Melissa Schoen (R)
Osage	Jack J. Hobbs (R)
Osborne	Paul Gregory (R)
Ottawa	Richard Buck (R)
Pawnee	Douglas W. McNett (R)
Pottawatomie	Sherri Schuck (R)
Pratt	Tracey T. Beverlin (R)
Rawlins	Isaac LeBlanc (R)
Reno	Thomas Stanton (R)
Republic	Justin L. Ferrell (R)
Rice	Remington S. Dalke (R)
Riley	Barry Wilkerson (R)
Rooks	Danielle N. Muir (R)
Rush	Tony Rues (D)
Russell	Daniel W. Krug (R)
Saline	Ellen Mitchell (R)
Scott	Rebecca J. Faurot (R)
Sedgwick	Marc Bennett (R)
Seward	Russell Hasenbank (R)
Shawnee	Michael F. Kagay (R)
Sheridan	Harry Joe Pratt (R)
Sherman, Wallace	Charles Moser (R)
Smith	Tabitha Owen (R)
Stafford	Michael Robinson (R)
Stanton	David C. Black (R)
Stevens	Paul Kitzke (R)
Sumner	Larry L. Marczynski II (R)
Thomas	Rachel Lamm (R)
Trego	Chris Lyon (R)
Wabaunsee	Timothy Alan Liesmann (R)
Washington	Elizabeth Baskerville Hiltgen (R)
Wichita	Laura Lewis (R)
Wilson	Kenley Thompson (R)
Woodson	Zelda Schlotterbeck (R)
Wyandotte	Mark Dupree (D)

== Kentucky ==
Kentucky judicial circuits map

Kentucky prosecutors, known as Commonwealth's Attorneys, are assigned by circuit.

Circuit	Counties	Commonwealth's Attorney
First Circuit	Ballard, Carlisle, Fulton, Hickman	Michael B. Stacy II (Ind.)
Second Circuit	McCracken	Donna L. Dixon (R)
Third Circuit	Christian	Maureen Leamy (R)
Fourth Circuit	Hopkins	Hannah Kington-Jarvis (D)
Fifth Circuit	Crittenden, Union, Webster	Zac Greenwell (D)
Sixth Circuit	Daviess	Mike Van Meter (D)
Seventh Circuit	Logan, Todd	Neil Kerr (R)
Eighth Circuit	Edmonson, Warren	Kori Beck Bumgarner (D)
Ninth Circuit	Hardin	Shane Young (R)
Tenth Circuit	Hart, LaRue, Nelson	Kyle W. Williamson (D)
Eleventh Circuit	Green, Marion, Taylor, Washington	Shelly Miller (R)
Twelfth Circuit	Henry, Oldham, Trimble	Courtney Baxter (R)
Thirteenth Circuit	Garrard, Jessamine	Clinton "Andy" Sims (R)
Fourteenth Circuit	Bourbon, Scott, Woodford	Kelli Kearney (R)
Fifteenth Circuit	Carroll, Grant, Owen	Leigh T. Roberts (R)
Sixteenth Circuit	Kenton	Rob Sanders (R)
Seventeenth Circuit	Campbell	Michael C. Zimmerman (R)
Eighteenth Circuit	Harrison, Nicholas, Pendleton, Robertson	Michael Wade Laws (R)
Nineteenth Circuit	Bracken, Fleming, Mason	Johnathan Gay (R)
Twentieth Circuit	Greenup, Lewis	Rhese David McKenzie (R)
Twenty-first Circuit	Bath, Menifee, Montgomery, Rowan	Ashton McKenzie (D)
Twenty-second Circuit	Fayette	Kimberly Baird (D)
Twenty-third Circuit	Estill, Lee, Owsley	Beverly Arvin Brewer (D)
Twenty-fourth Circuit	Johnson, Lawrence, Martin	David Matt Runyon (R)
Twenty-fifth Circuit	Clark, Madison	David W. Smith (D)
Twenty-sixth Circuit	Harlan	Karen S. Davenport (R)
Twenty-seventh Circuit	Knox, Laurel	Jackie Steele (R)
Twenty-eighth Circuit	Lincoln, Pulaski, Rockcastle	David Louis Dalton (R)
Twenty-ninth Circuit	Adair, Casey	Brian Wright (R)
Thirtieth Circuit	Jefferson	Gerina Whethers (D)
Thirty-first Circuit	Floyd	Brent Turner (D)
Thirty-second Circuit	Boyd	Rhonda M. Copley (R)
Thirty-third Circuit	Perry	John Hansen (R)
Thirty-fourth Circuit	McCreary, Whitley	Ronnie Bowling (R)
Thirty-fifth Circuit	Pike	Billy G. Slone (R)
Thirty-sixth Circuit	Knott, Magoffin	Todd Martin (D)
Thirty-seventh Circuit	Carter, Elliott, Morgan	Brandon Ison (D)
Thirty-eighth Circuit	Butler, Hancock, Ohio	Blake Chambers (R)
Thirty-ninth Circuit	Breathitt, Powell, Wolfe	Miranda S. King (D)
Fortieth Circuit	Clinton, Cumberland, Monroe	Jesse Stockton (R)
Forty-first Circuit	Clay, Jackson, Leslie	Haley Jo Fields (R)
Forty-second Circuit	Calloway, Marshall	Dennis Foust (Ind.)
Forty-third Circuit	Barren, Metcalfe	John Gardner (D)
Forty-fourth Circuit	Bell	Mike Taylor (R)
Forty-fifth Circuit	McLean, Muhlenberg	Clayton Douglas Adams (D)
Forty-sixth Circuit	Breckinridge, Grayson, Meade	Rick Allen Hardin (R)
Forty-seventh Circuit	Letcher	Matthew Thomas Butler (D)
Forty-eighth Circuit	Franklin	Larry Cleveland (D)
Forty-ninth Circuit	Allen, Simpson	Mike Lindsey (R)
Fiftieth Circuit	Boyle, Mercer	Justin Johnson (R)
Fifty-first Circuit	Henderson	Herbert L. McKee Jr. (D)
Fifty-second Circuit	Graves	George Shannon Powers (R)
Fifty-third Circuit	Anderson, Shelby, Spencer	Hart T. Megibben (R)
Fifty-fourth Circuit	Boone, Gallatin	Louis Kelly (R)
Fifty-fifth Circuit	Bullitt	Amanda Hernandez-Troutman (R)
Fifty-sixth Circuit	Caldwell, Livingston, Lyon, Trigg	Carrie L. Ovey-Wiggins (R)
Fifty-seventh Circuit	Russell, Wayne	Matthew Leveridge (R)

== Louisiana ==
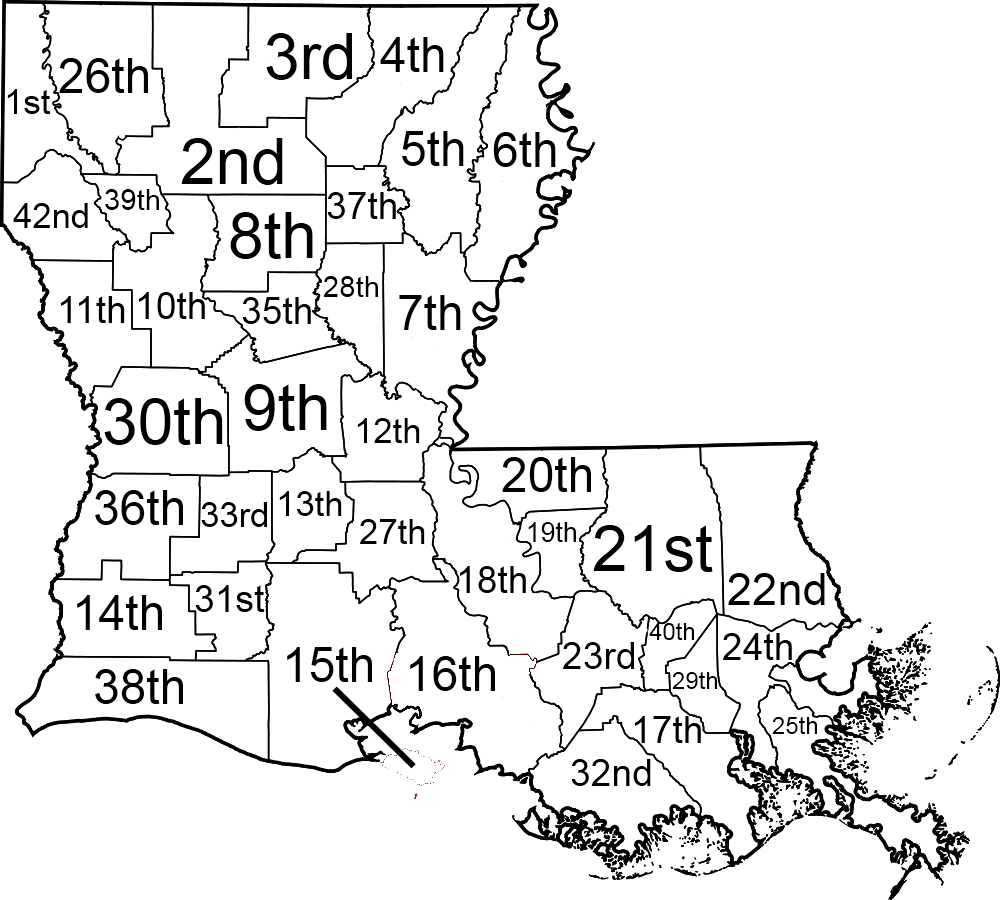
Map showing Louisiana judicial districts

Louisiana prosecutors are elected by district.

District	Parishes	District Attorney
1st	Caddo	James E. Stewart, Sr. (D)
2nd	Bienville, Claiborne, Jackson	Danny Newell (D)
3rd	Lincoln, Union	John F. Belton (Ind.)
4th	Morehouse, Ouachita	Steven Tew (Ind.)
5th	Franklin, Richland, West Carroll	Penny Douciere (R)
6th	East Carroll, Madison, Tensas	James E. Paxton (D)
7th	Catahoula, Concordia	Bradley R. Burget (D)
8th	Winn	R. Chris Nevils (Ind.)
9th	Rapides	Philip Terrell, Jr. (R)
10th	Natchitoches	Billy Joe Harrington (Ind.)
11th	Sabine	Don M. Burkett (R)
12th	Avoyelles	Charles A. Riddle III (D)
13th	Evangeline	Trent Brignac (R)
14th	Calcasieu	Stephen Dwight (R)
15th	Acadia, Lafayette, Vermilion	Donald Landry (R)
16th	Iberia, St. Martin, St. Mary	M. Bofill Duhé (R)
17th	Lafourche	Kristine M. Russell (R)
18th	Iberville, Pointe Coupee, West Baton Rouge	Antonio "Tony" Clayton (D)
19th	East Baton Rouge	Hillar C. Moore II (D)
20th	West Feliciana, East Feliciana	Samuel C. D'Aquilla (Ind.)
21st	Livingston, St. Helena, Tangipahoa	Scott M. Perrilloux (R)
22nd	St. Tammany, Washington	J. Collin Sims (R)
23rd	Ascension, Assumption, St. James	Ricky Babin (R)
24th	Jefferson	Paul D. Connick, Jr. (D)
25th	Plaquemines	Charles J. Ballay (R)
26th	Bossier, Webster	John "Schuyler" Marvin (R)
27th	St. Landry	Chad P. Pitre (R)
28th	LaSalle	J. Reed Walters (R)
29th	St. Charles	Joel T. Chaisson II (D)
30th	Vernon	Terry Lambright (Ind.)
31st	Jefferson Davis	Lauren Heinen (R)
32nd	Terrebonne	Joseph L. Waitz, Jr. (R)
33rd	Allen	Joseph Green, Jr. (Ind.)
34th	St. Bernard	Perry M. Nicosia (D)
35th	Grant	James "Jay" P. Lemoine (R)
36th	Beauregard	James Lestage (R)
37th	Caldwell	Brian Frazier (Ind.)
38th	Cameron	Thomas Barrett, III (R)
39th	Red River	Julie C. Jones (D)
40th	St. John the Baptist	Bridget A. Dinvaut (D)
Orleans		Jason Williams (D)
42nd	DeSoto	Charles B. Adams (R)

== Maine ==
Maine's prosecutors are elected by district.

District	Counties	District Attorney
1st	York	Kathryn M. Slattery (D)
2nd	Cumberland	Jacqueline A. Sartoris (D)
3rd	Androscoggin, Franklin, Oxford	Neil E. McLean Jr. (R)
4th	Kennebec, Somerset	Maeghan Maloney (D)
5th	Penobscot, Piscataquis	R. Christopher Almy (D)
6th	Knox, Lincoln, Sagadahoc, Waldo	Natasha C. Irving (D)
7th	Hancock, Washington	Robert C. Granger (I)
8th	Aroostook	Todd R. Collins (D)

== Maryland ==
Maryland's prosecutors are known as state's attorneys and are assigned by county.

County/Independent City	State's Attorney
Allegany	James Elliott (R)
Anne Arundel	Anne Colt Leitness (D)
Baltimore City	Ivan Bates (D)
Baltimore County	Scott Shellenberger (D)
Calvert	Robert Harvey (R)
Caroline	Sloane Franklin (R)
Carroll	Haven Shoemaker (R)
Cecil	James Dellmyer (R)
Charles	Anthony Covington (D)
Dorchester	Amanda Rae Leonard (R)
Frederick	J. Charles Smith III (R)
Garrett	Christian Mash (R)
Harford	Allison Healey (R)
Howard	Rich Gibson (D)
Kent	Brian DiGregory (D)
Montgomery	John McCarthy (D)
Prince George's	Aisha Braveboy (D)
Queen Anne's	Lance Richardson (R)
Somerset	Wess Garner (R)
St. Mary's	Jaymi Sterling (R)
Talbot	Joseph Coale (R)
Washington	Gina Cirincion (R)
Wicomico	Jamie Dykes (R)
Worcester	Kristin Heiser (R)

== Massachusetts ==
Massachusetts's district attorneys are elected in districts, two of which include multiple counties.

District	Counties	District Attorney
Berkshire		Timothy J. Shugrue (D)
Bristol		Thomas M. Quinn III (D)
Cape and Islands	Barnstable, Dukes, Nantucket	Robert J. Galibois (D)
Eastern	Essex	Paul F. Tucker (D)
Hampden		Anthony D. Gulluni (D)
Middle	Worcester (excluding Athol)	Joseph D. Early, Jr. (D)
Norfolk		Michael W. Morrissey (D)
Northern	Middlesex	Marian T. Ryan (D)
Northwestern	Franklin, Hampshire, and the town of Athol (Note: The town of Athol is in Worcester County but included in the Northwestern District.)	David E. Sullivan (D)
Plymouth		Timothy J. Cruz (R)
Suffolk		Kevin Hayden (D)

== Michigan ==
Michigan's prosecuting attorneys are assigned by county.

County	Prosecuting Attorney
Alcona	Thomas J. Weichel (R)
Alger	Robert T. Steinhoff (Ind.)
Allegan	Michael Villar (R)
Alpena	Cynthia Muszynski (R)
Antrim	James Rossiter (R)
Arenac	Curtis Broughton (R)
Baraga	Joseph P. O'Leary (R)
Barry	Julie Nakfoor Pratt (R)
Bay	Mike Kanuszewski (R)
Benzie	Sara Swanson (R)
Berrien	Steven Pierangeli (R)
Branch	Zachary Stempien (R)
Calhoun	David Gilbert (R)
Cass	Victor A. Fitz (R)
Charlevoix	Christopher "Kit" D. Tholen (R)
Cheboygan	Melissa Goodrich (R)
Chippewa	Robert L. Stratton III (R)
Clare	Michelle J. Ambrozaitis (R)
Clinton	Anthony Spagnuolo (R)
Crawford	Sierra Koch (R)
Delta	Lauren M. Wickman (R)
Dickinson	Lisa Richards (R)
Eaton	Douglas R. Lloyd (R)
Emmet	James R. Linderman (R)
Genesee	David S. Leyton (D)
Gladwin	Mark A. Toaz (R)
Gogebic	Nicholas J. Jacobs (R)
Grand Traverse	Noelle Moeggenberg (R)
Gratiot	Laura M. Bever (R)
Hillsdale	Neal A. Brady (R)
Houghton	Daniel J. Helmer (R)
Huron	Timothy J. Rutkowski (R)
Ingham	John Dewane (D)
Ionia	Kyle B. Butler (R)
Iosco	James A. Bacarella (R)
Iron	Chad A. DeRouin (R)
Isabella	David R. Barberi (R)
Jackson	Jerry M. Jarzynka (R)
Kalamazoo	Jeffrey S. Getting (D)
Kalkaska	Ryan Ziegler (R)
Kent	Christopher Becker (R)
Keweenaw	Charles Miller (D)
Lake	Craig Cooper (R)
Lapeer	John Miller (R)
Leelanau	Joseph T. Hubbell (R)
Lenawee	Jacqueline V. Wyse (R)
Livingston	David Reader (R)
Luce	Cameron S. Harwell (R)
Mackinac	J. Stuart Spencer (R)
Macomb	Peter J. Lucido (R)
Manistee	Jason Haag (R)
Marquette	Jenna M. Nelson (D)
Mason	Lauren Kreinbrink (R)
Mecosta	Jonathon Peterson (R)
Menominee	Jeffrey T. Rogg (R)
Midland	J. Dee Brooks (R)
Missaukee	David A. DenHouten (R)
Monroe	Jeffery A. Yorkey (R)
Montcalm	Andrea Krause (R)
Montmorency	Vicki Kundinger (R)
Muskegon	D.J. Hilson (D)
Newaygo	Rachel Robinson (R)
Oakland	Karen D. McDonald (D)
Oceana	Joseph Bizon (R)
Ogemaw	LaDonna Schultz (D)
Ontonagon	Vacant
Osceola	Anthony Badovinac (R)
Oscoda	Kristi L. McGregor (R)
Otsego	Michael Rola (R)
Ottawa	Lee Fisher (R)
Presque Isle	Ken Radzibon (R)
Roscommon	Michael T. Edwards (R)
Saginaw	John McColgan (D)
St. Clair	Michael Wendling (R)
St. Joseph	Deborah Davis (R)
Sanilac	Brenda Sanford (R)
Schoolcraft	Timothy R. Noble (R)
Shiawassee	Scott A. Koerner (R)
Tuscola	Mark E. Reene (R)
Van Buren	Susan Zuiderveen (R)
Washtenaw	Eli Savit (D)
Wayne	Kym L. Worthy (D)
Wexford	Corey Wiggins (R)

== Minnesota ==
Minnesota prosecutors are assigned by county and known as county attorneys. Their elections are non-partisan.

County	County Attorney
Aitkin	James P. Ratz
Anoka	Brad Johnson
Becker	Brian W. McDonald
Beltrami	David Hanson
Big Stone	Joseph Glasrud
Benton	Philip Miller
Blue Earth	Patrick McDermott
Brown	Chuck Hanson
Carlton	Lauri Ketola
Carver	Mark Metz
Cass	Ben Lindstrom
Chippewa	Matthew Haugen
Chisago	Janet Reiter
Clay	Brian J. Melton
Clearwater	Kathryn Lorsbach
Cook	Molly Hicken
Cottonwood	Nicholas A. Anderson
Crow Wing	Donald F. Ryan
Dakota	Kathryn M. Keena
Dodge	Paul Kiltinen
Douglas	Chad Larson
Faribault	Kathryn Karjala-Curtis
Fillmore	Brett Corson
Freeborn	David J. Walker
Goodhue	Stephen F. O'Keefe
Grant	Justin R. Anderson
Hennepin	Mary Moriarty
Houston	Samuel Jandt
Hubbard	Jonathan Frieden
Isanti	Jeffrey R. Edblad
Itasca	Matti R. Adam
Jackson	Sherry E. Haley
Kanabec	Barbara McFadden
Kandiyohi	Shane D. Baker
Kittson	Robert Albrecht
Koochiching	Jeffrey Naglosky
Lac qui Parle	Richard Stulz
Lake	Russell H. Conrow
Lake of the Woods	James C. Austad
Le Sueur	Brent Christian
Lincoln	Glen A. Petersen
Lyon	Richard R. Maes
Mahnomen	Mitchell Schluter
Marshall	Donald J. Aandal
Martin	Terry W. Viesselman
McLeod	Michael Junge
Meeker	Brandi Schiefelbein
Mille Lacs	Joe Walsh
Morrison	Brian Middendorf
Mower	Kristen Nelsen
Murray	Travis Smith
Nicollet	Michelle M. Zehnder Fischer
Nobles	Joseph Sanow
Norman	James D. Brue
Olmsted	Mark A. Ostrem
Otter Tail	Michelle Eldien
Pennington	Seamus Duffy
Pine	Reese Frederickson
Pipestone	Damain D. Sandy
Polk	Gregory A. Widseth
Pope	Neil Nelson
Ramsey	John Choi
Red Lake	Mike LaCoursiere
Redwood	Jenna Peterson
Renville	David Torgelson
Rice	John Fossum
Rock	Jeffrey L. Haubrich
Roseau	Kristy Kjos
St. Louis	Kimberly J. Maki
Scott	Ronald Hocevar
Sherburne	Kathleen A. Heaney
Sibley	David E. Schauer
Stearns	Janelle P. Kendall
Steele	Daniel McIntosh
Stevens	Aaron Jordan
Swift	Danielle Olson
Todd	Chuck Rasmussen
Traverse	Matthew Franzese
Wabasha	Karrie S. Kelly
Wadena	Kyra L. Ladd
Waseca	Rachel V. Cornelius
Washington	Kevin Magnuson
Watonwan	Stephen Lindee
Wilkin	Carl Thunem
Winona	Karin Sonneman
Wright	Brian Lutes
Yellow Medicine	Keith R. Helgeson

== Mississippi ==
Mississippi prosecutors are assigned by circuit.

Circuit	Counties	District Attorney
1	Alcorn, Itawamba, Lee, Monroe, Pontotoc, Prentiss, Tishomingo	John Weddle (R)
2	Hancock, Harrison, Stone	W. Crosby Parker (R)
3	Benton, Calhoun, Chickasaw, Lafayette, Marshall, Tippah, Union	Ben Creekmore (R)
4	Leflore, Sunflower, Washington	W. Dewayne Richardson (D)
5	Attala, Carroll, Choctaw, Grenada, Montgomery, Webster, Winston	William "Adam" Hopper (R)
6	Adams, Amite, Franklin, Wilkinson	Tim Cotton (Ind.)
7	Hinds	Jody Owens (D)
8	Leake, Neshoba, Newton, Scott	Steven S. Kilgore (R)
9	Issaquena, Sharkey, Warren	Richard (Ricky) Smith, Jr. (D)
10	Clarke, Kemper, Lauderdale, Wayne	Kassie Coleman (R)
11	Bolivar, Coahoma, Quitman, Tunica	Brenda F. Mitchell (D)
12	Forrest, Perry	Lin Carter (R)
13	Covington, Jasper, Simpson, Smith	Chris Hennis (R)
14	Lincoln, Pike, Walthall	Brendon Adams (R)
15	Jefferson Davis, Lamar, Lawrence, Marion, Pearl River	Hal Kittrell (R)
16	Clay, Lowndes, Noxubee, Oktibbeha	Scott W. Colom (D)
17	Panola, Tallahatchie, Tate, Yalobusha	Jay Hale (R)
18	Jones	Brad R. Thompson (R)
19	George, Greene, Jackson	Angel Myers McIlrath (R)
20	Madison, Rankin	John K. "Bubba" Bramlett, Jr. (R)
21	Holmes, Humphreys, Yazoo	Akillie Malone Oliver (D)
22	Claiborne, Copiah, Jefferson	Daniella M. Shorter (D)
23	DeSoto	Matthew Barton (R)

== Missouri ==
Missouri's prosecutors are known as prosecuting attorneys and serve a single county.

County	Prosecuting Attorney
Adair	David Goring (R)
Andrew	Monica Morrey (R)
Atchison	Dan Smith (Ind.)
Audrain	Jacob W. Shellabarger (R)
Barry	Amy L. Boxx (R)
Barton	Mike Smalley (R)
Bates	Hugh C. Jenkins (R)
Benton	Rod Richardson (R)
Bollinger	Stephen Gray (R)
Boone	Roger Johnson (D)
Buchanan	Michelle Davidson (R)
Butler	Kacey L. Proctor (R)
Caldwell	Brady C. Kopek (R)
Callaway	Benjamin J. Miller (R)
Camden	Richelle Grosvenor (R)
Cape Girardeau	Mark J. Welker (R)
Carroll	Cassandra Brown (D)
Carter	Hannah Pender (D)
Cass	Ben Butler (R)
Cedar	Ty Gaither (R)
Chariton	Clifford Thornburg (D)
Christian	Kristen Tuohy Avila (R)
Clark	Lindsay Gravett (R)
Clay	Zachary Thompson (Ind.)
Clinton	Brandi McClain (R)
Cole	Locke Thompson (R)
Cooper	Eric B. Phelps (R)
Crawford	David S. Smith (R)
Dade	Marci Greenwade (R)
Dallas	Jonathan Barker (R)
Daviess	Andrea "Annie" Gibson (D)
DeKalb	Erik C. Tate (R)
Dent	Andrew M. Curley (R)
Douglas	Matthew Thomas Weatherman (R)
Dunklin	Nicholas D. Jain (R)
Franklin	Matthew C. Becker (R)
Gasconade	Mary E. Weston (R)
Gentry	Jessica J. Jones (R)
Greene	Dan Patterson (R)
Grundy	Kelly W. Puckett (R)
Harrison	Alex Van Zandt (R)
Henry	LaCrisha Gray (R)
Hickory	Daniel Dysart (R)
Holt	Robert R. Shepherd (R)
Howard	Deborah K. Riekhof (R)
Howell	Michael P. Hutchings (R)
Iron	Brian Parker (D)
Jackson	Jean Peters Baker (D)
Jasper	Theresa Kenney (R)
Jefferson	Trisha C. Stefanski (R)
Johnson	Robert W. Russell (R)
Knox	Andrew Boster (R)
Laclede	Amy Folsom (R)
Lafayette	Kristen Ellis Hilbrenner (D)
Lawrence	Darlene Parrigon (R)
Lewis	Chelsea L. Fellinger (R)
Lincoln	Michael L. Wood (R)
Linn	Tracy L. Carlson (R)
Livingston	Adam L. Warren (R)
Macon	Josh Meisner (D)
Madison	Michael Ligons (R)
Maries	Anthony Skouby (R)
Marion	Luke A. Bryant (R)
McDonald	Maleia Cheney (R)
Mercer	Pamela Blevins (R)
Miller	Matt Howard (R)
Mississippi	Claire E. Poley (R)
Moniteau	Derek Kinde (R)
Monroe	Nicole Volkert (R)
Montgomery	Keith Freie (R)
Morgan	Dustin G. Dunklee (D)
New Madrid	Andrew Lawson (D)
Newton	William Lynch (R)
Nodaway	Tina Deiter (R)
Oregon	Justin Kelley (R)
Osage	Amanda L. Grellner (R)
Ozark	C. Lee Pipkins (R)
Pemiscot	Steve Horton (R)
Perry	Caitlin Hoeh Pistorio (R)
Pettis	Phillip Sawyer (R)
Phelps	Brendon Fox (R)
Pike	Alex Ellison (R)
Platte	Eric Zahnd (R)
Polk	Ken Ashlock (R)
Pulaski	Kevin Hillman (R)
Putnam	Brian Keedy (R)
Ralls	Rodney J. Rodenbaugh (D)
Randolph	Stephanie Luntsford (R)
Ray	Camille Johnston (R)
Reynolds	Bradley VanZee (R)
Ripley	Matt Michel (D)
Saline	Tim Thompson (R)
Schuyler	Lindsay Gravett (D)
Scotland	April S. Wilson (R)
Scott	Daniel Cobb (R)
Shannon	William Camm Seay (D)
Shelby	Jordan Force (D)
St. Charles	Joe McCulloch (R)
St. Clair	Daniel Dysart (R)
St. Francois	Blake Dudley (R)
St. Louis County	Melissa Price Smith (D)
St. Louis City (Note: St. Louis City's prosecutor is known as a Circuit Attorney.)	Gabe Gore (D)
Ste. Genevieve	Wayne R. Williams (D)
Stoddard	Jon-Sawyer Smith (R)
Stone	Matt Selby (R)
Sullivan	Jane Dunn (R)
Taney	William Duston (R)
Texas	Parke J. Stevens, Jr. (R)
Vernon	Brandi McInroy (R)
Warren	Kelly King (R)
Washington	John I. Jones IV (R)
Wayne	Ginger Kollner Joyner (R)
Webster	Benjamin J. Berkstresser (R)
Worth	Janet Wake Larison (R)
Wright	John Tyrell (R)

== Montana ==
Montana prosecutors are known as county attorneys. 54 out of 56 counties elect their prosecutors, with 2/3 holding partisan elections.

County	County Attorney
Beaverhead	Sky Steven Jones (R)
Big Horn	Jeanne Torske (Note: Elected in a nonpartisan election)
Blaine	Kelsie Harwood (D)
Broadwater	Cory Swanson
Carbon	Alex Nixon
Carter, Fallon (Note: Carter and Fallon Counties share their county attorney. In Fallon County, the county attorney faces election, but they are appointed in Carter County. (Hessick 2020, p. 183))	Darcy Wassman (R)
Cascade	Josh Racki (D)
Chouteau	Stephen Gannon (R)
Custer	Wyatt Glade
Daniels	Logan Olson (R)
Dawson	Brett Irogoin (R)
Deer Lodge	Ben Krakowa
Fergus	Kent Sipe
Flathead	Travis Ahner (R)
Gallatin	Audrey Cromwell (D)
Garfield	Gary Ryder
Glacier	Terryl Matt (D)
Golden Valley	Adam M. Larsen (R)
Granite	Blaine Bradshaw (R)
Hill	Lacey Lincoln (R)
Jefferson	Steve Haddon
Judith Basin	Joni Oja
Lake	James Lapotka (R)
Lewis and Clark	Kevin Downs
Liberty	Robert Padmos (R)
Lincoln	Marcia Boris (R)
Madison	David Buchler
McCone	John Hrubes (R)
Meagher	John Hurwitz (R)
Mineral	Debra Jackson (R)
Missoula	Kirsten Pabst (D)
Musselshell	Adam M. Larsen (R)
Park	Kendra Lassiter
Petroleum	Monte Boettger (Note: Petroleum County appoints its prosecutor. (Hessick 2020, p. 183))
Phillips	Dan O'Brien (R)
Pondera	Shari Lennon (R)
Powder River	Jeffrey Noble (R)
Powell	Kathryn McEnery (R)
Prairie	Daniel Rice (R)
Ravalli	Bill Fulbright (R)
Richland	Charity McClarty (R)
Roosevelt	Frank Piocos
Rosebud	C. Kristine White (R)
Sanders	Naomi Leisz
Sheridan	Benjamin Fosland (R)
Silver Bow	Eileen Joyce
Stillwater	Nancy Rohde (R)
Sweet Grass	Pat Dringman (R)
Teton	Joe Coble
Toole	Merle Raph (R)
Treasure	Hanna Schantz (R)
Valley	Dylan Jensen
Wheatland	Lynn Grant (R)
Wibaux	Ronald S. Efta (D)
Yellowstone	Scott Twito (R)

== Nebraska ==
Nebraska prosecutors are known as county attorneys. Though each attorney technically serves a single county, attorneys elected in one county are sometimes appointed to serve in others

County(ies)	County Attorney
Adams	Donna Fegler Daiss (R)
Antelope	Joseph Abler (R)
Arthur, Perkins	Richard Roberts (R)
Banner	Mark Kovarik (D)
Blaine	Glenn Clark (R)
Boone	John V. Morgan (D)
Box Butte	Marissa L. Curtiss (R)
Boyd	Brent Kelly (R)
Brown	Andy Taylor (R)
Buffalo	Shawn R. Eatherton (R)
Burt	Edmond E. Talbot III (R)
Butler	Julie L. Reiter (R)
Cass	Christopher Perrone (R)
Cedar	Nicholas S. Matney (R)
Chase	Arlan G. Wine (R)
Cherry	Eric Scott (R)
Cheyenne	Paul B. Schaub (R)
Clay	Ted S. Griess (R)
Colfax	Denise J. Kracl (R)
Cuming	Daniel Bracht (R)
Custer	Steven Bowers (R)
Dakota	Kimberly M. Watson (R)
Dawes	Vance E. Haug (R)
Dawson	Elizabeth F. Waterman (R)
Deuel	Jonathon Stellar (R)
Dixon	Leland K. Miner (R)
Dodge	Pam Hopkins (R)
Douglas	Donald Kleine (R)
Dundy	Gary Burke (R)
Fillmore	Jill R. Cunningham (R)
Franklin	Henry C. Schenker (R)
Frontier	Jon S. Schroeder (R)
Furnas	Patrick J. Calkins (R)
Gage	Roger L. Harris (R)
Garden	Philip E. Pierce (R)
Garfield	Dale Crandall (R)
Gosper	Beverly Bogle Louthan (R)
Grant	Terry Curtiss (R)
Greeley	Cindy Bassett (D)
Hall	Martin Klein (R)
Hamilton	Michael H. Powell (R)
Harlan	Bryan S. McQuay (R)
Hayes, Hitchcock	D. Eugene Garner (R)
Holt	Brent Kelly (R)
Hooker	George G. Vinton (R)
Howard	David T. Schroeder (R)
Jefferson	Joseph Casson (R)
Johnson	Rick Smith (R)
Kearney	Melodie Bellamy (R)
Keith	Randy Fair (R)
Keya Paha	Eric Scott (R)
Kimball	David Wilson (R)
Knox	John Thomas (R)
Lancaster	Patrick F. Condon (R)
Lincoln	Rebecca R. Harling (R)
Logan	Colten Venteicher
Loup	Jason White (R)
Madison	Joseph M. Smith (R)
McPherson	Whitney S. Lindstedt
Merrick	Lynelle Homolka (R)
Morrill	Travis R. Rodak (R)
Nance	Rodney Wetovick (R)
Nemaha	Louie M. Ligouri (R)
Nuckolls, Webster	Sara Bockstadter (R)
Otoe	Jennifer Panko-Rahe
Pawnee	Jennifer Stehlik Ladman (D)
Phelps	Michael Henry (R)
Pierce	Ted M. Lohrberg (R)
Platte	Carl K. Hart, Jr. (D)
Polk	Ronald E. Colling (R)
Red Willow	Paul Wood (R)
Richardson	Doug Merz (D)
Rock	Avery L. Gurnsey (R)
Saline	Tad Eickman (D)
Sarpy	Lee Polikov (R)
Saunders	Jennifer Joakim (R)
Scotts Bluff	Dave Eubanks (D)
Seward	Wendy Elston (R)
Sheridan	Jamian Simmons (R)
Sherman	Heather Sikyta (R)
Sioux	J. Adam Edmund (R)
Stanton	Bert Lammli (R)
Thayer	Daniel L. Werner (R)
Thomas	Kurt Arganbright (R)
Thurston	Lori Ubbinga (D)
Valley	Kayla C. Clark (R)
Washington	Scott VanderSchaaf (R)
Wayne	Amy K. Miller (R)
Wheeler	James J. McNally (Ind.)
York	John Lyons

== Nevada ==
Nevada district attorneys are elected by county.

County	District Attorney
Carson City	Garrit Pruyt (Note: Carson City uses non-partisan elections. (Hessick 2020, p. 202))
Churchill	Arthur Mallory (R)
Clark	Steven Wolfson (D)
Douglas	Mark Jackson (R)
Elko	Tyler Ingram (R)
Esmeralda	Robert Glennen (R)
Eureka	Theodore Beutel (R)
Humboldt	Kevin Pasquale (R)
Lander	Theodore Herrera (R)
Lincoln	Dylan Frehner (R)
Lyon	Stephen Rye (R)
Mineral	Jaren Stanton (R)
Nye	Chris Arabia (R)
Pershing	Bryce Shields (R)
Storey	Anne Langer (R)
Washoe	Christopher Hicks (R)
White Pine	Michael Wheable (R)

== New Hampshire ==
New Hampshire prosecutors are known as county attorneys.

County	County Attorney
Belknap	Keith Cormier(D)
Carroll	Keith Blair (R)
Cheshire	D. Chris McLaughlin (D)
Coos	John G. McCormick (D)
Grafton	Martha Ann Hornick (D)
Hillsborough	John J. Coughlin (R)
Merrimack	Paul Halvorsen (R)
Rockingham	Patricia Conway (R)
Strafford	Thomas P. Velardi (D)
Sullivan	Marc Hathaway (R)

== New Jersey ==
New Jersey prosecutors are appointed by the Governor and confirmed by the state senate. They are assigned by county.

County	County Prosecutor
Atlantic	William E. Reynolds
Bergen	Mark Musella
Burlington	LaChia Bradshaw
Camden	Grace C. MacAulay
Cape May	Jeffrey H. Sutherland
Cumberland	Jennifer Webb-McRae
Essex	Theodore N. Stephens II
Gloucester	Christine A. Hoffman
Hudson	Wayne Mello
Hunterdon	Renee Robeson
Mercer	Angelo J. Onofri
Middlesex	Linda Estremera
Monmouth	Raymond S. Santiago
Morris	Robert Carroll
Ocean	Bradley D. Billhimer
Passaic	Camelia M. Valdes
Salem	Kristin J. Telsey
Somerset	John P. McDonald
Sussex	Carolyn Murray
Union	William A. Daniel
Warren	James L. Pfeiffer

== New Mexico ==
New Mexico district attorneys are assigned by district.

District	Counties	District Attorney
1	Los Alamos, Rio Arriba, Santa Fe	Mary V. Carmack-Altwies (D)
2	Bernalillo	Sam Bregman (D)
3	Doña Ana	Fernando Macias (D)
4	Guadalupe, Mora, San Miguel	Thomas A. Clayton (D)
5	Chaves, Eddy, Lea	Dianna Luce (R)
6	Grant, Hidalgo, Luna	Norman Wheeler (R)
7	Catron, Sierra, Socorro, Torrance	Clint Wellborn (R)
8	Colfax, Taos, Union	Marcus J. Montoya (D)
9	Curry, Roosevelt	Quentin Paul Ray
10	De Baca, Harding, Quay	Heidi Lyn Adams (R)
11 (Note: The 11th district has two district attorneys.)	San Juan	Jack Fortner (R)
11	McKinley	Bernadine Martin (D)
12	Lincoln, Otero	Ryan Suggs (R)
13	Cibola, Sandoval, Valencia	Barbara A. Romo (D)

== New York ==
County	District Attorney
Albany	David Soares (D)
Allegany	Ian Jones (R)
Bronx	Darcel D. Clark (D)
Broome	Paul Battisti (R)
Cattaraugus	Lori Rieman (R)
Cayuga	Brittany Grome Antonacci (R)
Chautauqua	Jason Schmidt (R)
Chemung	Weeden A. Wetmore (R)
Chenango	Michael Ferrareese (R)
Clinton	Andrew J. Wylie (D)
Columbia	Chris Liberati-Conant (D)
Cortland	Patrick Perfetti (R)
Delaware	Shawn J. Smith (R)
Dutchess	Anthony Parisi (R)
Erie	John J. Flynn (D)
Essex	Kristy L. Sprague (R)
Franklin	Elizabeth M. Crawford (R)
Fulton	Michael J. Poulin (R)
Genesee	Kevin Finnell (R)
Greene	Joseph Stanzione (R)
Hamilton	Marsha King Purdue (R)
Herkimer	Jeffrey Carpenter (R)
Jefferson	Kristyna Mills (R)
Kings (Brooklyn)	Eric Gonzalez (D)
Lewis	Jeffery Tompkins (R)
Livingston	Ashley Williams (R)
Madison	William G. Gabor (R)
Monroe	Brian P. Green (D)
Montgomery	Lorraine Diamond (R)
Nassau	Anne T. Donnelly (R)
New York (Manhattan)	Alvin Bragg (D)
Niagara	Brian Seaman (R)
Oneida	Todd Carville (R)
Onondaga	William J. Fitzpatrick (R)
Ontario	James Ritts (R)
Orange	David Hoovler (R)
Orleans	Joseph V. Cardone (R)
Oswego	Anthony J. Dimartino Jr. (R)
Otsego	John M. Muehl (R)
Putnam	Robert V. Tendy (R)
Queens	Melinda Katz (D)
Rensselaer	Mary Pat Donnelly (D)
Richmond (Staten Island)	Michael McMahon (D)
Rockland	Thomas E. Walsh III (D)
St. Lawrence	Gary Pasqua (R)
Saratoga	Karen Heggen (R)
Schenectady	Robert M. Carney (D)
Schoharie	Susan Mallery (R)
Schuyler	Joseph Fazzary (R)
Seneca	John Nabinger (R)
Steuben	Brooks Baker (R)
Suffolk	Raymond A. Tierney (R)
Sullivan	Brian Contay (D)
Tioga	Kirk Martin (R)
Tompkins	Matthew Van Houten (D)
Ulster	Manny Nneji (D)
Warren	Jason Carusone (R)
Washington	Tony Jordan (R)
Wayne	Christine Callanan (R)
Westchester	Susan Cacace (D)
Wyoming	Vincent A. Hemming (R)
Yates	Todd Casella (R)

== North Carolina ==
North Carolina elects its district attorneys in multi-county districts.

District	Counties	District Attorney
1	Camden, Chowan, Currituck, Dare, Gates, Pasquotank, Perquimans	Jeff Cruden (R)
2	Beaufort, Hyde, Martin, Tyrrell, Washington	Thomas Anglim (R)
3	Pitt	Faris Dixon (D)
4	Carteret, Craven, Pamlico	Matthew Wareham (R)
5	Duplin, Jones, Onslow, Sampson	Ernie Lee (R)
6	New Hanover, Pender	Jason Smith (R)
7	Bertie, Halifax, Hertford, Northampton	Kim Gourrier Scott (D)
8	Edgecombe, Nash, Wilson	Jeffrey A. Marsigli (R)
9	Greene, Lenoir, Wayne	Matt Delbridge (R)
10	Wake	Lorrin Freeman (D)
11	Franklin, Granville, Person, Vance, Warren	Mike Waters (R)
12	Harnett, Lee	Suzanne Matthews (R)
13	Johnston	Jason Waller (R)
14	Cumberland	Billy West (D)
15	Bladen, Brunswick, Columbus	Jon David (R)
16	Durham	Satana Deberry (D)
17	Alamance	Sean Boone (R)
18	Chatham, Orange	Jeff Nieman (D)
20	Robeson	Matt Scott (D)
21	Anson, Richmond, Scotland	James Adams (D)
22	Caswell, Rockingham	Jason Ramey (R)
23	Stokes, Surry	Tim Watson (R)
24	Guilford	Avery Crump (D)
25	Cabarrus	Ashlie Shanley (R)
26	Mecklenburg	Spencer Merriweather (D)
27	Rowan	Brandy Cook (R)
28	Montgomery, Stanly	T. Lynn Clodfelter (R)
29	Hoke, Moore	Mike Hardin (R)
30	Union	Trey Robison (R)
31	Forsyth	Jim O'Neill (R)
32	Alexander, Iredell	Sarah Kirkman (R)
33	Davidson, Davie	Garry Frank (R)
34	Alleghany, Ashe, Wilkes, Yadkin	Tom Horner (R)
35	Avery, Madison, Mitchell, Watauga, Yancey	Seth Banks (R)
36	Burke, Caldwell, Catawba	Scott Reilly (R)
37	Randolph	Andy Gregson (R)
38	Gaston	Travis Page (R)
39	Cleveland, Lincoln	Mike Miller (R)
40	Buncombe	Todd Williams (D)
41	McDowell, Rutherford	Ted Bell (R)
42	Henderson, Polk, Transylvania	R. Andrew Murray (R)
43	Cherokee, Clay, Graham, Haywood, Jackson, Macon, Swain	Ashley Hornsby Welch (R)

== North Dakota ==
North Dakota assigns state's attorneys by county. Their elections are non-partisan, while two counties (Golden Valley and Steele) appoint their prosecutors.

County	State's Attorney
Adams	Aaron Roseland
Barnes	Tonya Duffy
Benson	James Wang
Billings	Pat Weir
Bottineau	Michael McIntee
Bowman	Andrew Weiss
Burke	Amber Fiesel
Burleigh	Julie Lawyer
Cass	Birch Burdick
Cavalier	Scott Stewart
Dickey	Gary Neuharth
Divide	Seymour Jordan
Dunn	Stephenie Davis
Eddy	Ashley Lies
Emmons	Joseph Hanson
Foster	Kara Brinster
Golden Valley	Chistina Wenko
Grand Forks	Haley Wamstad
Grant	Grant Walker
Griggs	Jayme Tenneson
Hettinger	David Crane
Kidder	Eric Hetland
LaMoure	James Shockman
Logan	Isaac Zimmerman
McHenry	Joshua Frey
McIntosh	Mary DePuydt
McKenzie	Ty Skarda
McLean	Ladd Erickson
Mercer	Jessica Binder
Morton	Allen Koppy
Mountrail	Wade Enget
Nelson	Jayme Tenneson
Oliver	John Mahoney
Pembina	Rebecca Flanders
Pierce	Galen Mack
Ramsey	Kari Agotness
Ransom	Fallon Kelly
Renville	Seymour Jordan
Richland	Megan Kummer
Rolette	Brian Grosinger
Sargent	Jayne Pfau
Sheridan	Ladd Erickson
Sioux	Chris Redmann
Slope	Erin Melling
Stark	Tom Henning
Steele	Charles Stock
Stutsman	Fritz Fremgen
Towner	Joshua Frey
Traill	Charles Stock
Walsh	Kelley Cole
Ward	Roza Larson
Wells	Kathleen Murray
Williams	Marlyce Wilder

== Ohio ==
Ohio counties elect a prosecuting attorney for 4 year terms as defined by the Ohio Revised Code Title 3 Section 309. They start their role the first Monday of January after their election. Their qualifications include being licensed to practice law in the state and not being a current member of the Ohio General Assembly or a mayor.

County	Prosecuting Attorney
Adams	Ariana Bowles Norris
Allen	Destiny Caldwell (R)
Ashland	Christopher R. Tunnell (R)
Ashtabula	April Grabman
Athens	Keller Blackburn (D)
Auglaize	Benjamin R. Elder
Belmont	Kevin Flanagan (R)
Brown	Zachary A. Corbin (R)
Butler	Michael T. Gmoser (R)
Carroll	Steven D. Barnett (R)
Champaign	Kevin S. Talebi (R)
Clark	Dan Driscoll (R)
Clermont	Mark Tekulve (R)
Clinton	Brian A. Shidaker
Columbiana	Vito Abruzzino (R)
Coshocton	Benjamin Edward Hall (R)
Crawford	Matthew E. Crall (R)
Cuyahoga	Michael O'Malley (D)
Darke	James Bennett
Defiance	Morris J. Murray (R)
Delaware	Melissa Schiffel (R)
Erie	Kevin J. Baxter (D)
Fairfield	R. Kyle Witt (R)
Fayette	Jess C. Weade (R)
Franklin	Shayla Favor
Fulton	T. Luke Jones (R)
Gallia	Jason D. Holdren (R)
Geauga	James R. Flaiz (R)
Greene	David Hayes (R)
Guernsey	Lindsey Angler (R)
Hamilton	Connie Pillich (D)
Hancock	Sean Abbott
Hardin	Bradford W. Bailey (R)
Harrison	Lauren Knight (R)
Henry	Gwen Howe-Gebers (D)
Highland	Anneka Collins (R)
Hocking	Jennifer Graham
Holmes	Matt Muzic (R)
Huron	James Joel Sitterly (R)
Jackson	Trent Douthett
Jefferson	Jane Hanlin (D)
Knox	Charles T. McConville (R)
Lake	Charles E. Coulson (R)
Lawrence	Brigham McKinley Anderson (R)
Licking	Jenny Wells (R)
Logan	Eric C. Stewart (R)
Lorain	Anthony (Tony) Cillo (R)
Lucas	Julia R. Bates (D)
Madison	Nicholas Adkins (R)
Mahoning	Lynn Maro (R)
Marion	Raymond A. Grogan (R)
Medina	S. Forrest Thompson (R)
Meigs	James K. Stanley (R)
Mercer	Erin Minor (R)
Miami	Paul M. Watkins
Monroe	James L. Peters (D)
Montgomery	Mathias H. Heck, Jr. (D)
Morgan	Richard Welch
Morrow	Andrew Wick
Muskingum	Ronald (Ron) Welch (R)
Noble	Jordan Croucher (R)
Ottawa	James VanEerten (R)
Paulding	Matt Miller
Perry	Terry Rugg
Pickaway	Jayme Fountain
Pike	Michael (Mike) A. Davis (D)
Portage	Connie Lewandowski (R)
Preble	Eric Marit
Putnam	Gary L. Lammers (D)
Richland	Jodie Schumacher (R)
Ross	Jeffrey C. Marks (R)
Sandusky	Beth Tischler (R)
Scioto	Shane A. Tieman (R)
Seneca	Derek W. DeVine (Ind.)
Shelby	William Zimmerman
Stark	Kyle Stone (R)
Summit	Elliot Kolkovich (D)
Trumbull	Dennis Watkins (D)
Tuscarawas	R. Scott Deedrick
Union	David W. Phillips (R)
Van Wert	Dillon Staas IV
Vinton	William L. Archer, Jr. (R)
Warren	David P. Fornshell (R)
Washington	Joe Derkin (R)
Wayne	Angela Wypasek (R)
Williams	Katherine J. Zartman (R)
Wood	Paul A. Dobson (R)
Wyandot	Eric J. Figlewicz (R)

== Oklahoma ==
Oklahoma assigns its district attorneys by district.

District	Counties	District Attorney
1	Beaver, Cimarron, Harper, Texas	George Buddy Leach III (R)
2	Beckham, Custer, Ellis, Roger Mills, Washita	Angela Marsee (R)
3	Greer, Harmon, Jackson, Kiowa, Tillman	David Thomas (R)
4	Blaine, Canadian, Garfield, Grant, Kingfisher	Mike Fields (R)
5	Comanche, Cotton	Kyle Cabelka (R)
6	Caddo, Grady, Jefferson, Stephens	Jason Hicks (R)
7	Oklahoma	Vicki Behenna (D)
8	Kay, Noble	Brian Hermanson (R)
9	Logan, Payne	Laura Thomas (R)
10	Osage, Pawnee	Mike Fisher (R)
11	Nowata, Washington	Will Drake (R)
12	Craig, Mayes, Rogers	Matt Ballard (R)
13	Delaware, Ottawa	Kenny Wright (R)
14	Tulsa	Steve Kunzweiler (R)
15	Muskogee	Larry Edwards (R)
16	Latimer, Le Flore	Kevin S. Merritt (R)
17	Choctaw, McCurtain, Pushmataha	Mark Matloff (R)
18	Haskell, Pittsburg	Chuck Sullivan (R)
19	Atoka, Bryan, Coal	Timothy Webster (R)
20	Carter, Johnston, Love, Marshall, Murray	Craig Ladd (R)
21	Cleveland, Garvin, McClain	Greg Mashburn (R)
22	Hughes, Pontotoc, Seminole	Erik Johnson (R)
23	Lincoln, Pottawatomie	Adam Pantner (R)
24	Creek, Okfuskee	Max Cook (R)
25	Okmulgee, McIntosh	Carol Iski (R)
26	Alfalfa, Dewey, Major, Woods, Woodward	Christopher Boring (R)
27	Adair, Cherokee, Sequoyah, Wagoner	Jack Thorp (R)

== Oregon ==
Oregon assigns district attorneys by county. Their elections are non-partisan.

County	District Attorney
Baker	Greg Baxter
Benton	Ryan S. Joslin
Clackamas	John Wentworth
Clatsop	Ron L. Brown
Columbia	Jeffrey D. Auxier
Coos	R. Paul Frasier
Crook	Wade Whiting
Curry	Joshua A. Spansail
Deschutes	John Hummel
Douglas	Rick Wesenberg
Gilliam	Marion Weatherford
Grant	Jim Carpenter
Harney	Hughes Ryan
Hood River	Carrie Rasmussen
Jackson	Beth Heckert
Jefferson	Stephen F. Lariche
Josephine	Joshua J. Eastman
Klamath	Eve A. Costello
Lake	Ted K. Martin
Lane	Patricia Perlow
Lincoln	Lanee Danforth
Linn	Doug Marteeny
Malheur	David M. Goldthorpe
Marion	Paige E. Clarkson
Morrow	Justin Nelson
Multnomah	Nathan Vasquez
Polk	Aaron Felton
Sherman	Wade McLeod
Tillamook	William Porter
Umatilla	Daniel R. Primus
Union	Kelsie McDaniel
Wallowa	Rebecca Frolander
Wasco	Matthew Ellis
Washington	Kevin Barton
Wheeler	Gretchen M. Ladd
Yamhill	Brad Berry

== Pennsylvania ==
Pennsylvania assigns district attorneys by county.

County	District Attorney
Adams	Brian R. Sinnett (R)
Allegheny	Stephen A. Zappala (R) (Note: Zappala ran in the Democratic primary and lost. He then ran in the general election as a Republican and won.)
Armstrong	Katie Charlton (R)
Beaver	Nate Bible (D)
Bedford	Ashlan J. Clark (R)
Berks	John T. Adams (D)
Blair	Peter J. Weeks (R)
Bradford	Richard A. Wilson (R)
Bucks	Joe Khan (D)
Butler	Richard A. Goldinger (R)
Cambria	Jessica Aurandt (R)
Cameron	Paul J. Malizia (R)
Carbon	Mike Greek (R)
Centre	Bernie F. Cantorna (D)
Chester	Christopher de Barrena-Sarobe (D)
Clarion	Drew Welsh (R)
Clearfield	Ryan P. Sayers (R)
Clinton	David A. Strouse (D)
Columbia	Daniel Lynn (D)
Crawford	Paula Digiacomo (R)
Cumberland	Sean M. McCormack (R)
Dauphin	Francis T. Chardo (R)
Delaware	Tanner Rouse (D)
Elk	Beau M. Grove (R)
Erie	Elizabeth Hirz (R)
Fayette	Mike Aubele (R)
Forest	Alyce M. Busch (D)
Franklin	Ian Brink (R)
Fulton	Eric J. Weisbrod (R)
Greene	Brianna Vanata (R)
Huntingdon	David G. Smith (R)
Indiana	Robert F. Manzi, Jr. (R)
Jefferson	Jeffrey D. Burkett (R)
Juniata	Corey J. Snook (R)
Lackawanna	Brian J. Gallagher (D)
Lancaster	Heather L. Adams (R)
Lawrence	Joshua Lamancusa (D)
Lebanon	Pier Hess Graf (R)
Lehigh	Gavin P. Holihan (R)
Luzerne	Samuel M. Sanguedolce (R)
Lycoming	Tom Marino (R)
McKean	Stephanie Vettenburg-Shaffer (R)
Mercer	Peter C. Acker (R)
Mifflin	Christopher Torquato (R)
Monroe	Mike Manusco (D)
Montgomery	Kevin R. Steele (D)
Montour	Angela L. Mattis (R)
Northampton	Stephen Baratta (D)
Northumberland	Michael C. O’Donnell (R)
Perry	Clay Merris (R)
Philadelphia	Lawrence S. Krasner (D)
Pike	Raymond J. Tonkin (R)
Potter	Andy Watson (R)
Schuylkill	Michael O’Pake (D)
Snyder	Heath Brosius (R)
Somerset	Thomas Leiden (R)
Sullivan	Julie Gavitt Shaffer (R)
Susquehanna	Marion O’Malley (R)
Tioga	Sandra Olson (R)
Union	Brian Kerstetter (R)
Venango	D. Shawn White (R)
Warren	Cody Brown (R)
Washington	Jason Walsh (R)
Wayne	A. G. Howell (R)
Westmoreland	Nicole Ziccarelli (R)
Wyoming	Joe Peters (R)
York	Timothy J. Barker (R)

== Rhode Island ==
All prosecutions in the state of Rhode Island are handled by the Attorney General of Rhode Island. The current Attorney General is Peter Neronha (D).

== South Carolina ==
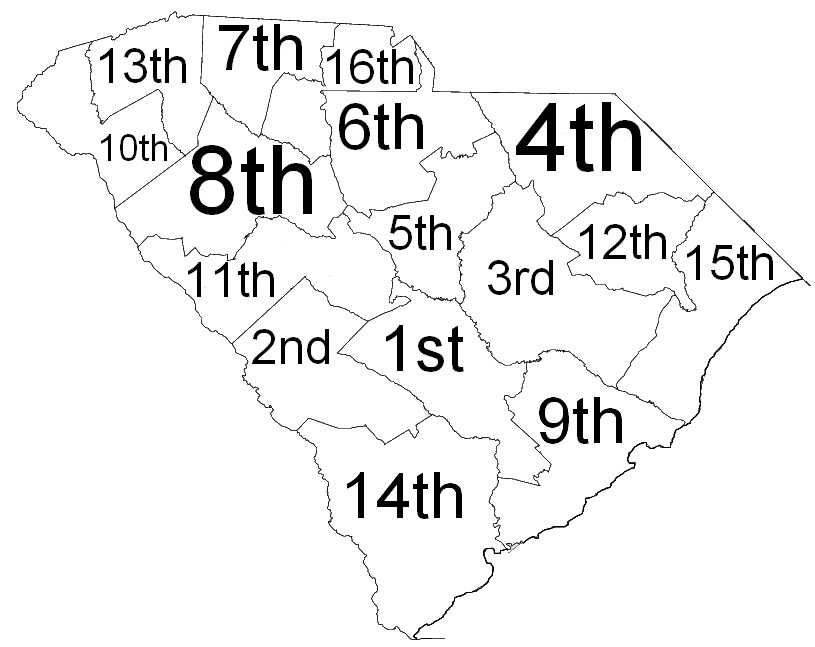
Map of South Carolina's judicial circuits

South Carolina prosecutors are known as solicitors. They are assigned by judicial circuit.

Circuit	Counties	Solicitor
1st	Calhoun, Dorchester, Orangeburg	David Pascoe, Jr. (R)
2nd	Aiken, Bamberg, Barnwell	Bill Weeks (R)
3rd	Clarendon, Lee, Sumter, Williamsburg	Ernest A. "Chip" Finney III (D)
4th	Chesterfield, Darlington, Dillon, Marlboro	Mike Burch (R)
5th	Kershaw, Richland	Byron Gipson (D)
6th	Chester, Fairfield, Lancaster	Randy E. Newman, Jr. (R)
7th	Cherokee, Spartanburg	Barry J. Barnette (R)
8th	Abbeville, Greenwood, Laurens, Newberry	David M. Stumbo (R)
9th	Berkeley, Charleston	Scarlett A. Wilson (R)
10th	Anderson, Oconee	David R. Wagner, Jr. (R)
11th	Edgefield, Lexington, McCormick, Saluda	S.R. (Rick) Hubbard III (R)
12th	Florence, Marion	E.L. (Ed) Clements III (D)
13th	Greenville, Pickens	W. Walter Wilkins III (R)
14th	Allendale, Beaufort, Colleton, Hampton, Jasper	Isaac McDuffie (Duffie) Stone III (R)
15th	Georgetown, Horry	Jimmy A. Richardson II (R)
16th	Union, York	Kevin S. Brackett (R)

== South Dakota ==
South Dakota assigns state's attorneys by county. Four pairs of counties share a state's attorney.

County	State's Attorney
Aurora	Rachel Mairose (R)
Beadle	Michael Moore (D)
Bennett	Sarah Harris (R)
Bon Homme	Lisa Rothschadl (R)
Brookings	Daniel Nelson (R)
Brown	Ernest Thompson (R)
Brule	Theresa Maule Rossow (R)
Buffalo	David Larson (D)
Butte	Cassie Wendt (R)
Campbell	Mark Kroontje (R)
Charles Mix	Steven Cotton (R)
Clark	Chad Fjelland (R)
Clay	Alexis Tracy (R)
Codington	Rebecca Morlock Reeves (R)
Corson, Perkins, Ziebach	Shane Penfield (R)
Custer	Tracy Kelley (R)
Davison	James Miskimins (R)
Day	John D. Knight (D)
Deuel	Jared I. Gass (R)
Dewey	Steven Aberle (D)
Douglas	Craig Parkhurst (R)
Edmunds	Vaughn Beck (R)
Fall River, Oglala Lakota	Lance S. Russell (R)
Faulk	Emily Marcotte (R)
Grant	Jackson Schwandt (D)
Gregory	Amy Bartling (R)
Haakon	Thomas Maher (R)
Hamlin	John R. Delzer
Hand	Elton R. Anson (R)
Hanson	James Davies (D)
Harding	Dusty Ginsbach (R)
Hughes	Jessica LaMie
Hutchinson	Glenn Roth (R)
Hyde	Merlin Voorhees (Ind.)
Jackson	Daniel Van Gorp (R)
Jerauld	Dedrich Koch (R)
Jones	Kirby Krogman (Ind.)
Kingsbury	Gary W. Schumacher (R)
Lake	Wendy Kloeppner (R)
Lawrence	John Fitzgerald (R)
Lincoln	Thomas Wollman (R)
Lyman	Steven R. Smith (Ind.)
Marshall	Victor Rapkoch (Ind.)
McCook	Mike Fink (R)
McPherson	Austin Hoffman (R)
Meade	Michele Bordewyk (R)
Mellette, Tripp	Zach Pahlke (R)
Miner	Kristian D. Ellendorf (R)
Minnehaha	Daniel Haggar (R)
Moody	Paul M. Lewis (R)
Pennington	Mark Vargo (R)
Potter	Craig Smith (R)
Roberts	Dylan D. Kirchmeier
Sanborn	Jeffrey Larson (R)
Spink	Victor Fischbach (D)
Stanley	Thomas P. Maher (R)
Sully	Emily Sovell (R)
Todd	Alvin Pahlke (R)
Turner	Katelynn Hoffman (R)
Union	Jerry Miller (R)
Walworth	James Hare (Ind.)
Yankton	Robert Klimisch (R)

== Tennessee ==
Map of Tennessee's judicial districts

Tennessee prosecutors are known as district attorneys general. Collectively they are form "The Tennessee District Attorneys General Conference."

Partisanship among Tennessee DAs as of 2026 Republican Democratic Independent

Judicial District	Counties	District Attorney
1st	Carter, Johnson, Unicoi, and Washington	Steven R. Finney (R)
2nd	Sullivan	Barry P. Staubus (R)
3rd	Greene, Hamblen, Hancock, and Hawkins	Dan E. Armstrong (R)
4th	Cocke, Grainger, Jefferson, and Sevier	Jimmy B. Dunn (R)
5th	Blount	Ryan Desmond (R)
6th	Knox	Charme Allen (R)
7th	Anderson	Dave S. Clark (Ind.)
8th	Campbell, Claiborne, Fentress, Scott, and Union	Jared R. Effler (Ind.)
9th	Loudon, Meigs, Morgan, and Roane	Russell Johnson (Ind.)
10th	Bradley, McMinn, Monroe, and Polk	Stephen Hatchett (R)
11th	Hamilton	Coty Wamp (R)
12th	Bledsoe, Franklin, Grundy, Marion, Rhea, and Sequatchie	Courtney Lynch (R)
13th	Clay, Cumberland, DeKalb, Overton, Pickett, Putnam, and White	Bryant C. Dunaway (R)
14th	Coffee	Craig Northcott (R)
15th	Jackson, Macon, Smith, Trousdale, and Wilson	Jason Lawson (R)
16th	Cannon and Rutherford	Jennings H. Jones (R)
17th	Bedford, Lincoln, Marshall, and Moore	Robert J. Carter (Ind.)
18th	Sumner	Tohmas Dean (R)
19th	Montgomery and Robertson	Robert Nash (R)
20th	Davidson	Glenn Funk (D)
21st	Hickman, Lewis, and Perry	Hans Schwendimann (R)
22nd	Giles, Lawrence, Maury, and Wayne	Brent A. Cooper (R)
23rd	Cheatham, Dickson, Houston, Humphreys, and Stewart	Ray Crouch, Jr. (R)
24th	Benton, Carroll, Decatur, Hardin, and Henry	Neil Thomson (R)
25th	Fayette, Hardeman, Lauderdale, McNairy, and Tipton	Mark E. Davidson (R)
26th	Chester, Henderson, and Madison	Jody Pickens (R)
27th	Obion and Weakley	Colin Johnson (Ind.)
28th	Crockett, Gibson, and Haywood	Frederick Agee (R)
29th	Dyer and Lake	Danny Goodman, Jr. (Ind.)
30th	Shelby	Steven J. Mulroy (D)
31st	Van Buren and Warren	Matt Colvard (Ind.)
32nd	Williamson	Stacey Edmondson (R)

== Texas ==
Texas prosecutors cover districts that include multiple counties or single counties. Some district attorneys are assigned a district which may or may not cover multiple counties.

=== District Attorneys (multiple counties) ===
District	Counties	District Attorney
1	Sabine, San Augustine	J. Kevin Dutton (R)
2	Cherokee	Elmer Beckworth (R)
8	Delta, Franklin, Hopkins	Will Ramsay (R)
9	Archer (part)	David A. Levy (R)
9	Montgomery	Brett W. Ligon (R)
18	Johnson, Somervell	Dale Hanna (R)
21	Burleson	Susan R. Deski (R)
21	Washington	Julie Renken (R)
22	Comal	Jennifer Anne Tharp (R)
23	Matagorda	Steven E. Reis (D)
24	DeWitt, Goliad, Refugio	Rob Lassmann (R)
26	Williamson	Shawn Dick (R)
27	Bell	Henry L. Garza (R)
29	Palo Pinto	Kriste Burnett (R)
31	Gray, Hemphill, Lipscomb, Roberts, Wheeler	Franklin McDonough (R)
32	Fisher, Mitchell, Nolan	Ricky N. Thompson (R)
33	Blanco, Burnet, Llano, San Saba	Wiley B. "Sonny" McAfee (R)
34	Culberson, El Paso, Hudspeth	James B. Montoya (D)
35	Brown, Mills	Michael B. Murray (R)
36	San Patricio	Sam Smith (R)
38	Medina	Mark P. Haby (R)
38	Real, Uvalde	Christina Mitchell Busbee (R)
39	Haskell, Kent, Stonewall, Throckmorton	Mike Fouts (D)
42	Coleman	Heath Hemphill (R)
43	Parker	Jeff Swain (R)
46	Foard, Hardeman, Wilbarger	Jon Whitsitt (R)
47	Armstrong, Potter	Jason Herring (R)
49	Webb, Zapata	Isidro R. Alaniz (D)
50	Baylor, Cottle, King, Knox	Hunter Brooks (R)
51	Irion, Schleicher, Sterling, Tom Green (part)	Allison Palmer (R)
52	Coryell	Dustin "Dusty" Boyd (R)
53	Travis	José Garza (D)
63	Kinney, Terrell, Val Verde	Suzanne West (R)
64	Hale	Wally Hatch (R)
66	Hill	Mark Pratt (R)
69	Dallam, Hartley, Moore, Sherman	Erin Lands (R)
70	Ector	Dusty Gallivan (R)
76	Camp, Titus	David Colley (R)
79	Brooks, Jim Wells	Carlos O. Garcia (D)
81	Atascosa, Frio, Karnes, La Salle, Wilson	Audrey Gossett Louis (R)
83	Brewster, Jeff Davis, Pecos (part), Presidio	Ori Tucker White (R)
84	Hansford, Hutchinson	Mark W. Snider (R)
85	Brazos	Jarvis Parsons (R)
88	Hardin	Rebecca R. Walton (R)
90	Stephens, Young	Dee H. Peavy (R)
97	Archer (part), Clay, Montague	Casey Polhemus (R)
100	Carson, Childress, Collingsworth, Donley, Hall	Luke Inman (R)
105	Kenedy, Kleberg	John T. Hubert (R)
105	Nueces	James Granberry (R)
106	Dawson, Gaines, Garza, Lynn	Phillip Mack Furlow (R)
109	Crane, Winkler	Amanda Navarette (R)
110	Briscoe, Dickens, Floyd, Motley	Wade Jackson (R)
112	Crockett, Pecos (part), Reagan, Sutton, Upton	Laurie K. English (R)
118	Howard, Martin	Hardy L. Wilkerson (R)
119	Concho, Runnels, Tom Green (part)	John Best (R)
123	Shelby	Karren S. Price (R)
132	Borden, Scurry	Ben R. Smith (R)
142	Midland	Laura A. Nodolf (R)
143	Loving, Reeves, Ward	Sarah Stogner (R)
145	Nacogdoches	Andrew Jones (R)
156	Bee, Live Oak, McMullen	Jose Aliseda (R)
159	Angelina	Layne Thompson (R)
173	Henderson	Jenny Palmer (R)
196	Hunt	Noble D. Walker, Jr. (R)
198	Bandera, Kerr (part)	Stephen Harpold (R)
216	Gillespie, Kerr (part)	Lucy Wilke (R)
220	Bosque, Comanche, Hamilton	Adam Sibley (R)
229	Duval, Jim Hogg, Starr	Gocha Ramirez (D)
235	Cooke	John Warren (R)
253	Liberty	Jennifer L. Bergman (R)
258	Trinity	Bennie Schiro (R)
259	Jones, Shackelford	Joe Edd Boaz (R)
266	Erath	Alan Nash (R)
268	Fort Bend	Brian M. Middleton (D)
271	Jack, Wise	James Stainton (R)
286	Cochran, Hockley	Angela Overman (R)
287	Bailey, Parmer	Kathryn Gurley (R)
293	Dimmit, Maverick, Zavala	Roberto Serna (D)
329	Wharton	Dawn Allison (R)
344	Chambers	Cheryl Lieck (R)
349	Houston	Donna G. Kaspar (R)
355	Hood	Ryan Sinclair (R)
369	Leon	Hope Knight (R)
451	Kendall	Nicole Bishop (R)
452	Edwards, Kimble, Mason, McCulloch, Menard	Tonya S. Ahlschwede (R)
506	Grimes	Andria Bender (R)

=== District Attorneys (single county) ===
County	District Attorney
Anderson	Allyson Mitchell (R)
Andrews	Sean B. Galloway (D)
Aransas	Amanda Oster (R)
Austin	Travis Koehn (R)
Bastrop	Bryan Goertz (R)
Bexar	Joe Gonzales (D)
Bowie	Jerry Rochelle (R)
Brazoria	Thomas J. "Tom" Selleck (R)
Caldwell	Fred H. Weber (D)
Calhoun	Sara M. Rodriguez (R)
Callahan	Shane Deel (R)
Cameron	Luis V. Saenz (D)
Cass	Courtney Shelton (R)
Castro	Shalyn Hamlin (R)
Collin	Greg Willis (R)
Colorado	Jay Johannes (R)
Crosby	Michael Sales (R)
Dallas	John Creuzot (D)
Deaf Smith	Chris Strowd (R)
Denton	Paul Johnson (R)
Eastland	Brad Stephenson (R)
Ellis	Ann Montgomery (R)
Falls	Kathryn J. "Jodi" Gilliam (R)
Fannin	Richard Glaser (R)
Fayette	James Hebrich (R)
Freestone	Brian Evans (R)
Galveston	Jack Roady (R)
Glasscock	Hardy L. Wilkerson (R)
Gonzales	Paul Watkins (R)
Grayson	J. Brett Smith (R)
Gregg	Tom Watson (R)
Guadalupe	David Willborn (R)
Harris	Sean B. Teare (D)
Harrison	Reid McCain (R)
Hays	Kelly Higgins (D)
Hidalgo	Toribio “Terry” Palacios (D)
Jackson	Pam Guenther (R)
Jasper	Anne Pickle (R)
Jefferson	Keith Giblin (D)
Kaufman	Erleigh Norville Wiley (R)
Lamar	Gary Young (R)
Lamb	Scott A. Say (R)
Lampasas	John Greenwood (R)
Lavaca	Kyle A. Denney (R)
Lee	Martin Placke (R)
Limestone	Roy DeFriend (R)
Lubbock	Sunshine Stanek (R)
Madison	Brian Risinger (R)
Marion	Angela Smoak (R)
McLennan	Josh Tetens (R)
Milam	Bill Torrey (R)
Morris	Rick Shelton (R)
Navarro	Will Thompson (R)
Newton	Courtney Tracy Ponthier (R)
Ochiltree	Jose N. Meraz (R)
Oldham	Kent Birdsong (R)
Orange	John D. Kimbrough (R)
Panola	Danny Buck Davidson (R)
Polk	William Lee Hon (R)
Rain	Robert Vititow (R)
Randall	Robert Love (R)
Red River	Val Varley (R)
Robertson	W. Coty Siegert (R)
Rockwall	Kenda Culpepper (R)
Rusk	Michael Jimerson (R)
San Jacinto	Robert Trapp (R)
Smith	Jacob Putman (R)
Swisher	J. Michael Criswell (R)
Tarrant	Phil Sorrells (R)
Taylor	James Hicks (R)
Terry	Jo'Shae Ferguson-Worley (R)
Tyler	Lucas Babin (R)
Upshur	Billy Byrd (R)
Van Zandt	Tonda Curry (R)
Victoria	Constance Filley Johnson (R)
Walker	Will Durham (R)
Waller	Elton Mathis (R)
Wichita	John Gillespie (R)
Willacy	Annette C. Hinojosa (D)
Wood	Angela Albers (R)
Yoakum	Bill Helwig (R)

== Utah ==
Utah assigns district attorneys by county. They are called "County Attorneys."

County	County Attorney
Beaver	Von J. Christiansen (D)
Box Elder	Stephen R. Hadfield (R)
Cache	Dane Stuart Murray (R)
Carbon	Christian Bryner (R)
Daggett	Kent Snider (R)
Davis	Troy S. Rawlings (R)
Duchesne	Stephen D. Foote (R)
Emery	Michael D. Olsen (R)
Garfield	Barry Huntington (R)
Grand	Stephen J. Stocks (Ind.)
Iron	Chad Dotson (R)
Juab	Ryan Peterson (R)
Kane	Robert C. Van Dyke (R)
Millard	Patrick S. Finlinson (R)
Morgan	Garret Smith (R)
Piute	Scott Burns (R)
Rich	Benjamin Willoughby (R)
Salt Lake	Sim Gill (D) (Note: The prosecutor in Salt Lake County is known as a "District Attorney.")
San Juan	Mitchell Maughan (R)
Sanpete	Kevin Daniels (R)
Sevier	Casey Jewkes (R)
Summit	Margaret Olson (D)
Tooele	Scott Broadhead (R)
Uintah	Jaymon Thomas (R)
Utah	Jeff Gray (R)
Wasatch	Scott H. Sweat (R)
Washington	Eric Clarke (R)
Wayne	Michael Winn (R)
Weber	Christopher F. Allred (R)

== Vermont ==
Vermont prosecutors are known as "State's Attorneys." They are assigned by county.

County	State's Attorney
Addison	Eva P. Vekos (D)
Bennington	Erica Albin Marthage (D/R)
Caledonia	Jessica Zaleski (R/D)
Chittenden	Sarah Fair George (D/R)
Essex	Vincent Illuzzi (D/R/Prog.)
Franklin	Bram Kranichfeld (D)
Grand Isle	Douglas DiSabito (D/R)
Lamoille	Todd A. Shove (D)
Orange	Dickson Corbett (D/R)
Orleans	Farzana Leyva (R)
Rutland	Ian Sullivan (D)
Washington	Michele Donnelly (D)
Windham	Tracy Kelly Shriver (D)
Windsor	Ward Goodenough (D)

== Virginia ==
Virginia prosecutors are known as "Commonwealth's Attorneys." Most are assigned by county or independent city, although some independent cities lack their own prosecutor.

County/Independent City	Commonwealth's Attorney
Accomack	J. Spencer Morgan (Ind.)
Albemarle	James M. "Jim" Hingeley (D)
Alexandria City	Bryan L. Porter (D)
Alleghany (incl. Covington City)	Ann Gardner (Ind.)
Amelia	Lee R. Harrison (Ind.)
Amherst	W. Lyle Carver (Ind.)
Appomattox	Leslie M. "Les" Fleet (Ind.)
Arlington County and Falls Church City	Parisa Dehghani-Tafti (D)
Augusta	Timothy A. "Tim" Martin (R)
Bath	Charles S. "Charlie" Moore (Ind.)
Bedford	W. Wes Nance (R)
Bland	Patrick D. White (R)
Botetourt	John R.H. Alexander, II (R)
Bristol City	Jerry A. Wolfe (R)
Brunswick	Meredith A. Smith (Ind.)
Buchanan	M. Nikki Stiltner (R)
Buckingham	Kemper M. Beasley, III (Ind.)
Buena Vista City	Josh O. Elrod (Ind.)
Campbell	Paul A. McAndrews (Ind.)
Caroline	Benjamin P. "Ben" Heidt (Ind.)
Carroll (incl. Galax City (Note: The city of Galax is split between two prosecutors.))	Roger D. Brooks (R)
Charles City County	Tyler A. Klink (Ind.)
Charlotte	William E. "Bill" Green, Jr. (Ind.)
Charlottesville City	Joseph D. "Joe" Platania (D)
Chesapeake City	Matthew R. "Matt" Hamel (R)
Chesterfield	Erin B. Barr (Ind.)
Clarke	Anne M. Williams (R)
Colonial Heights City	Alfred G. "Gray" Collins, III (Ind.)
Craig	Matthew "Matt" Dunne (R)
Culpeper	Russell L. Rabb, III (R)
Cumberland	Wendy J.D. Hannah (Ind.)
Danville City	Michael J. "Mike" Newman (Ind.)
Dickenson	Joshua H. "Josh" Newberry (R)
Dinwiddie	Amanda N. Mann (Ind.)
Essex	Vince S. Donoghue (R)
Fairfax County (incl. Fairfax City)	Steve T. Descano (D)
Fauquier	Scott C. Hook (R)
Floyd	W. Eric Branscom (R)
Fluvanna	Jeffrey W. "Jeff" Haislip (Ind.)
Franklin	W. Cooper Brown, IV (R)
Frederick	Ross P. Spicer (R)
Fredericksburg City	Elizabeth K. "Libby" Humphries (Ind.)
Giles	Robert M. "Bobby" Lilly, Jr. (Ind.)
Gloucester	John T. Dusewicz (R)
Goochland	John L. Lumpkins, Jr. (R)
Grayson (incl. Galax City)	Brandon R. Boyles (R)
Greene	Edwin R. "Win" Consolvo (Ind.)
Greensville (incl. Emporia City)	Patricia T. "Patti" Watson (Ind.)
Halifax	Tracy Q. Martin (Ind.)
Hampton City	Anton A. Bell (D)
Hanover	Mackenzie K. Babichenko (R)
Henrico	Shannon L. Taylor (D)
Henry	M. Andrew Nester (Ind.)
Highland	Megan L. Yelen (R)
Hopewell City	Richard K. "Rick" Newman (Ind.)
Isle of Wight	Georgette C. Phillips (Ind.)
James City County (incl. Williamsburg City)	Nathan R. "Nate" Green (R)
King and Queen	Meredith D. Adkins (Ind.)
King George	Keri A. Gusmann (Ind.)
King William	Tiffany M. Webb (Ind.)
Lancaster	Anthony G. "Tony" Spencer (R)
Lee	H. Fuller Cridlin (D)
Loudoun	Robert D. "Bob" Anderson (R)
Louisa	Russell E. "Rusty" McGuire (R)
Lunenburg	Rhonda K. Alexander (Ind.)
Lynchburg City	Bethany A.S. Harrison (R)
Madison	Clarissa T. Berry (Ind.)
Martinsville City	G. Andrew "Andy" Hall (Ind.)
Mathews	T. Marie Walls (Ind.)
Mecklenburg	R. Allen Nash (Ind.)
Middlesex	Michael T. "Mike" Hurd (Ind.)
Montgomery	Mary K. Pettitt (R)
Nelson	Daniel L. Rutherford (R)
New Kent	T. Scott Renick (Ind.)
Newport News City	Howard E. Gwynn (D)
Norfolk City	Ramin Fatehi (D)
Northampton	Jack A. Thornton, III (Ind.)
Northumberland	Jane B. Wrightson (Ind.)
Nottoway	Leanne E. Watrous (Ind.)
Orange	S. Page Higginbotham, III (Ind.)
Page	Bryan M. Cave (R)
Patrick	Dayna K. Bobbitt (Ind.)
Petersburg City	Tiffany Buckner (D)
Pittsylvania	R. Bryan Haskins (R)
Portsmouth City	Stephanie N. Morales (D)
Powhatan	Robert C. "Rob" Cerullo (Ind.)
Prince Edward	Megan L. Clark (D)
Prince George	Susan O. Fierro (R)
Prince William (incl. Manassas City and Manassas Park City)	Amy K. Ashworth (D)
Pulaski	Justin L. Griffith (R)
Radford City	Christian E. "Chris" Rehak (D)
Rappahannock	Arthur L. "Art" Goff (Ind.)
Richmond City	Colette W. McEachin (D)
Richmond County	Elizabeth A. "Libby" Trible (Ind.)
Roanoke City	John M. McNeil (D)
Roanoke County	Brian T. Holohan (R)
Rockbridge (incl. Lexington City)	Jared L. Moon (R)
Rockingham (incl. Harrisonburg City)	Marsha L. Garst (R)
Russell	Zackary A. "Zack" Stoots (R)
Salem City	Thomas E. "Tom" Bowers (Ind.)
Scott	Kyle B. Kilgore (R)
Shenandoah	Elizabeth H. "Liz" Cooper (R)
Smyth	Philip L. "Bucky" Blevins (R)
Southampton (incl. Franklin City)	Eric A. Cooke (Ind.)
Spotsylvania	G. Ryan Mehaffey (R)
Stafford	Eric L. Olsen (R)
Staunton City	John B. Baber II (Ind.)
Suffolk City	Narendra R. Pleas (D)
Surry	Derek A. Davis (Ind.)
Sussex	Regina T. Sykes (Ind.)
Tazewell	J. Chris Plaster (R)
Virginia Beach City	Colin D. Stolle (R)
Warren	John S. Bell (R)
Washington	Joshua S. "Josh" Cumbow (D)
Waynesboro City	David L. Ledbetter (Ind.)
Westmoreland	Julia H. Sichol (Ind.)
Winchester City	Heather D. Hovermale (Ind.)
Wise (incl. Norton City)	M. Brett Hall (R)
Wythe	Michael D. "Mike" Jones (R)
York (incl. Poquoson City)	Krystyn L. Reid (R)

== Washington ==
Washington assigns district attorneys by county. They are known as "Prosecuting Attorneys."

County	Prosecuting Attorney
Adams	Randy Flyckt (R)
Asotin	Curt Liedkie (Ind.)
Benton	Eric Eisinger (R)
Chelan	Robert Sealby (R)
Clallam	Mark Nicholas (R)
Clark	Tony Golik (Note: The Clark County Prosecuting Attorney is a non-partisan position.)
Columbia	Dale Slack (Ind.)
Cowlitz	Ryan Jurvakainen (Ind.)
Douglas	Gordon Edgar (Ind.)
Ferry	Kathryn Burke (R)
Franklin	Shawn Sant (R)
Garfield	Matthew Newberg (R)
Grant	Kevin McCrae (R)
Grays Harbor	Norma Tillotson (D)
Island	Gregory Banks (Ind.)
Jefferson	James Kennedy (D)
King	Leesa Manion (Note: The King County Prosecuting Attorney is a non-partisan position.)
Kitsap	Chad Enright (D)
Kittitas	Gregory Zempel (R)
Klickitat	David Quesnel (Ind.)
Lewis	Jonathan Meyer (R)
Lincoln	Adam Walser (R)
Mason	Michael Dorcy (R)
Okanogan	Albert Lin (R)
Pacific	Michael Rotham (R)
Pend Oreille	Dolly Hunt (R)
Pierce	Mary Robnett (Ind.)
San Juan	Amy Vira (D)
Skagit	Rich Weyrich (Ind.)
Skamania	Adam Kick (Ind.)
Snohomish	Jason Cummings (D)
Spokane	Larry Haskell (R)
Stevens	Erika George (R)
Thurston	Jon Tunheim (D)
Wahkiakum	Dan Bigelow (D)
Walla Walla	Gabriel Acosta (R)
Whatcom	Eric Richey (D)
Whitman	Denis Tracy (R)
Yakima	Joseph Brusic (R)

== West Virginia ==
West Virginia assigns district attorneys by county. They are known as "Prosecuting Attorneys."

County	Prosecuting Attorney
Barbour	Andrew Phillips (R)
Berkeley	Joseph R. Kisner (R)
Boone	Dan Holstein (R)
Braxton	Dwayne Vandevender (D)
Brooke	Allison Cowden (R)
Cabell	Jason M. Spears (R)
Calhoun	Michael J. Hicks (R)
Clay	Jim E. Samples (D)
Doddridge	A. Brooke Fitzgerald (R)
Fayette	Anthony Cilberti, Jr. (D)
Gilmer	Gerald B. Hough (D)
Grant	John Ours (R)
Greenbrier	Patrick Via (R)
Hampshire	Rebecca L. Miller (R)
Hancock	Stephen Dragisich (R)
Hardy	Jeffrey N. Weatherholt (R)
Harrison	Rachel Romano (D)
Jackson	David Kyle Moore (R)
Jefferson	Adam Ward (R)
Kanawha	Debra Rusnak (R)
Lewis	Christina T. Flanigan (R)
Lincoln	Jeffrey S. Bowen (D)
Logan	David Wandling (D)
Marion	Jeffrey L. Freeman (D)
Marshall	Joseph Canestraro (D)
Mason	Seth Gaskins (R)
McDowell	Brittany Puckett (D)
Mercer	Brian K. Cochran (R)
Mineral	F. Cody Pancake III (R)
Mingo	Brock Mounts (R)
Monongalia	Gabrielle Mucciola (D)
Monroe	Justin St. Clair (D)
Morgan	Dan James (R)
Nicholas	Paul Williams (R)
Ohio	Scott R. Smith (D)
Pendleton	April Mallow (R)
Pleasants	Brian K. Carr (D)
Pocahontas	Teresa Helmick (R)
Preston	James Shay, Jr. (R)
Putnam	Kris Raynes (R)
Raleigh	Ben Hatfield (R)
Randolph	Michael Parker (D)
Ritchie	Samuel C. Rogers II (D)
Roane	Josh Downey (R)
Summers	Kristin R. Cook (R)
Taylor	John R. Bord (R)
Tucker	Savannah Wilkins (D)
Tyler	D. Luke Furbee (R)
Upshur	Bryan S. Hinkle (R)
Wayne	Matthew Deerfield (D)
Webster	Mary "Beth" Snead (D)
Wetzel	Timothy Haught (D)
Wirt	Austin Grimmet (Ind.)
Wood	Pat Lefebure (R)
Wyoming	Gregory Bishop (R)

== Wisconsin ==
Wisconsin assigns district attorneys by county.

County	District Attorney
Adams	Rebecca Maki-Wallander (Ind.)
Ashland	Blake Gross (D)
Barron	Brian Wright (R)
Bayfield	Kimberly Lawton (D)
Brown	David L. Lasee (R)
Buffalo	Tom Bilski (R)
Burnett	James Jay Rennicke (R)
Calumet	Nathan Haberman (R)
Chippewa	Wade C. Newell (R)
Clark	Melissa Inlow (D)
Columbia	Brenda Yaskal (D)
Crawford	Lukas L. Steiner (D)
Dane	Ismael R. Ozanne (D)
Dodge	Kurt F. Klomberg (R)
Door	Colleen Nordin (R)
Douglas	Mark Fruehauf (D)
Dunn	Andrea Nodolf (R)
Eau Claire	Peter J. Rindal (D)
Florence	Doug Drexler (R)
Fond du Lac	Eric Toney (R)
Forest	Alex Seifert (Ind.)
Grant	Lisa Riniker (R)
Green	Craig R. Nolen (R)
Green Lake	Andrew Christenson (R)
Iowa	Zach Leigh (D)
Iron	Matthew Tingstad (R)
Jackson	Daniel Diehn (R)
Jefferson	Monica Hall (D)
Juneau	Kenneth Hamm (R)
Kenosha	Xavier Solis (R)
Kewaunee	Andrew Naze (D)
La Crosse	Tim Gruenke (D)
Lafayette	Jenna Gill (R)
Langlade	Elizabeth R. Gebert (R)
Lincoln	Galen Bayne-Allison (D)
Manitowoc	Jacalyn LaBre (R)
Marathon	Kyle Mayo (R)
Marinette	DeShea D. Morrow (R)
Marquette	Clifford Burdon (Ind.)
Milwaukee	John T. Chisholm (D)
Monroe	Kevin D. Croninger (R)
Oconto	Edward Burke (R)
Oneida	Michael W. Schiek (R)
Outagamie	Mindy Tempelis (R)
Ozaukee	Benjamin Lindsay (R)
Pepin	Jon D. Seifert (D)
Pierce	Halle Hatch (D)
Polk	Jeffrey L. Kemp (R)
Portage	Louis J. Molepske, Jr. (D)
Price	Karl Kelz (R)
Racine	Tricia Hanson (R)
Richland	Jennifer Harper (R)
Rock	David J. O'Leary (D)
Rusk	Annette Barna (D)
Saint Croix	Karl Anderson (R)
Sauk	Michael X. Albrecht (D)
Sawyer	Bruce R. Poquette (R)
Shawano/Menominee	Greg Parker (R)
Sheboygan	Joel Urmanski (R)
Taylor	Kristi Tlusty (D)
Trempealeau	John Sacia (D)
Vernon	Timothy J. Gaskell (R)
Vilas	Martha Milanowski (R)
Walworth	Zeke Wiedenfeld (R)
Washburn	Aaron Marcoux (R)
Washington	Mark D. Bensen (R)
Waukesha	Lesli Boese (R)
Waupaca	Veronica Isherwood (R)
Waushara	Matthew R. Leusink (R)
Winnebago	Christian A. Gossett (R)
Wood	Craig Lambert (R)

== Wyoming ==
Wyoming assigns district attorneys by county, who are thus known as "County Attorneys."

County	County Attorney
Albany	Edward Kurt Britzius (D)
Big Horn	Marcia Bean (R)
Campbell	Mitch Damsky (R)
Carbon	Ashley Mayfield Davis (R)
Converse	Quentin Richardson (R)
Crook	Joseph M. Baron (D)
Fremont	Patrick LeBrun (R)
Goshen	Eric Boyer (R)
Hot Springs	Jill Logan (R)
Johnson	Tucker J. Ruby (R)
Laramie	Sylvia Miller Hackl (R)
Lincoln	Spencer Allred (R)
Natrona	Dan Itzen (R)
Niobrara	Anne Wasserburger (R)
Park	Brian Skoric (R)
Platte	Douglas W. Weaver (R)
Sheridan	Dianna Bennett (R)
Sublette	Michael Crosson (R)
Sweetwater	Daniel Erramouspe (R)
Teton	Erin Weisman (D)
Uinta	Loretta Rae Howieson (R)
Washakie	John P. Worrall (R)
Weston	Alex Berger (R)
