= Mark Peterson (district attorney) =

American politician

Mark A. Peterson

District Attorney for Contra Costa County, California
- In office 2010 – June 14, 2017

Personal details
- Born: August 1958 (age 67)
- Party: Republican

Mark A. Peterson is an American Republican politician who served as the district attorney for Contra Costa County in California from 2010 to 2017. Peterson resigned after a scandal involving the use of campaign funds for personal use.

== Early life and education ==
Peterson was raised in Anchorage, Alaska. He obtained a Bachelors of Arts degree in history from the University of Colorado, and went on to earn a Juris Doctor degree from the University of Denver law school.

== Early political career ==
Prior to being elected district attorney for Contra Costa County, Peterson served on the city council of Concord, California. He was first elected to the Concord City Council in 1995, and served on the council until 2010, when he resigned to take over as district attorney for Contra Costa County. During his tenure on the Concord City Council, he served as mayor three times.

== District attorney ==
Peterson was elected to the position of district attorney of Contra Costa County in 2010. In 2014 he was re-elected, running unopposed.

=== Scandal ===
In December 2016 Peterson admitted that between 2011 and 2015 he used $66,372 from his campaign account for personal expenses such as groceries, jewelry store bills and movie tickets over 600 times. He had to pay a $45,000 fine to the California Fair Political Practices Commission. Peterson fully reimbursed his campaign account after being audited by tax authorities. In June 2017, Xavier Becerra, the California Attorney General, opened a criminal investigation against Peterson. On June 14, 2017, Peterson pleaded no contest to one count of perjury as part of a plea bargain agreement in which all 12 other charges were dropped. As part of his plea agreement, he resigned. His sentence carried three years of probation and 250 hours of community service. The plea deal allowed him to keep his pension, estimated at $128,000 per year, with adjustments for inflation.

Prior to his resignation, he was planning on running for reelection in 2018.

== Electoral history ==
Concord, California city council election, 2000 (top two elected)
Party	Candidate	Votes	%
N/A	Mark Peterson	23,244	36.25%
N/A	Bill McManigal	21,303	33.23%
N/A	Marcus O'Connell	13,059	20.37%
N/A	J.T. "Jack" Novak	6,508	10.15%

Concord, California city council election, 2004 (top two elected)
Party	Candidate	Votes	%
N/A	Mark Peterson	27,362	44.90%
N/A	William "Bill" Shinn	19,705	32.34%
N/A	Harmon C. West	13,868	22.76%

Concord, California city council election, 2008 (top two elected)
Party	Candidate	Votes	%
N/A	Mark Peterson	25,974	41.98%
N/A	William "Bill" Shinn	24,066	38.90%
N/A	La Shawn B. Wells	11,566	18.69%
N/A	Write-in candidates	267	0.43%

Contra Costa County, California district attorney primary election, 2010
Party	Candidate	Votes	%
N/A	Mark Peterson	82,774	47.44%
N/A	William "Dan" O'Malley	63,700	36.51%
N/A	Elle B. Falahat	27,403	15.70%
N/A	Write-in candidates	610	0.35%

Contra Costa County, California district attorney general election, 2010
Party	Candidate	Votes	%
N/A	Mark Peterson	163,810	57.43%
N/A	Dan O'Malley	120,408	42.21%
N/A	Write-in candidates	1,015	0.36%

Contra Costa County, California district attorney primary election, 2014
Party	Candidate	Votes	%
N/A	Mark Peterson	109,814	98.65%
N/A	Write-in candidates	1,503	1.35%
