= Kasten =

Kasten is a surname. Notable people with the surname include:

- Bob Kasten (born 1942), U.S. Republican politician
- G. Randy Kasten, attorney and author
- Jeremy Kasten, American filmmaker
- Karl Kasten (1916–2010), painter-printmaker-educator in the San Francisco Bay Area
- Kasten Antell (1845–1906), Finnish politician
- Lloyd Kasten (1905–1999), American Hispanist, medievalist, lexicographer, and Lusophile
- Sam Kasten, comic actor in Yiddish Theater
- Stan Kasten (born 1952), president, and part-owner, of the Los Angeles Dodgers
- Tim Kasten (born 1983), German international rugby union player

== See also ==
- Hoher Kasten, mountain in the Appenzell Alps, overlooking the Rhine in Eastern Switzerland
- Kasten bei Böheimkirchen, town in the district of Sankt Pölten-Land in the Austrian state of Lower Austria
- Kasten-brust armour, German form of plate armour from the first half of 15th century
- Kaisten (disambiguation)
