= Susan Duncan (academic administrator) =

American academic administrator and lawyer

Dean of the University of Mississippi School of Law
- Incumbent
- Assumed office August 2017
- Preceded by: Deborah H. Bell (interim)

Interim Dean of the University of Louisville School of Law
- In office 2012–2017
- Preceded by: Jim Chen
- Succeeded by: Colin Crawford

Personal details
- Born: Susan Hanley Louisville, Kentucky, U.S.
- Children: 7
- Education: Miami University (BA); University of Louisville School of Law (JD)

Susan Hanley Duncan is an American academic administrator and lawyer serving as dean of the University of Mississippi School of Law since August 2017. She was the interim dean of the University of Louisville School of Law from 2012 to 2017.

== Early life and education ==
Duncan is from Louisville, Kentucky. Her father John "Jack" Hanley was an attorney and her mother, Jean Kipp, was a teacher. Duncan graduated from the Sacred Heart Academy in 1984. She graduated cum laude from Miami University in 1987 with B.A. in speech communication and a minor in political science. She completed her spring 1986 semester in Luxembourg through the Miami University European Center. She earned a J.D. cum laude at the University of Louisville School of Law in 1991.

== Career ==
Duncan worked as an associate from 1991 to 1992 at Boehl Stopher Graves & Deindoerfer in Louisville, Kentucky. From 1994 to 1996, she was an adjunct professor for legal methods at the Cecil C. Humphreys School of Law. She joined Brandeis School of Law in 1997 as an adjunct professor. She was an adjunct professor of legal studies at Spalding University in 1999. She returned to Brandeis in 1999 as a visiting professor where she was promoted to associate dean of academic affairs and faculty development in 2011 and full professor in 2012. She served as the interim dean from 2012 to 2017. Duncan was one of the top four candidates to become the Brandeis dean but the school eventually selected Colin Crawford. On August 1, 2017, joined the University of Mississippi School of Law as its dean, succeeding interim dean Debbie Bell. She is the first female dean to serve in a non interim capacity at the University of Mississippi School of Law on August 1, 2017. She became a fellow of the American Bar Foundation in 2020. In 2022, served as president of the Scribes legal society.

== Personal life ==
Duncan is married has six daughters and one son.
