= Golden Gate University School of Law =

Law school in San Francisco, California

Coordinates: 37.7892°N 122.3988°W

- Parent school: Golden Gate University
- Established: October 1, 1901
- School type: Private non-profit
- Parent endowment: $59.9 million
- Dean: Mark Yates
- Location: San Francisco, California, US
- Enrollment: 198 (2023)
- Faculty: 91 (33 full-time)
- USNWR ranking: 178th–196th (bottom 8% at most) (2024)
- Bar pass rate: 45.38% (2022 1st time takers)
- Website: https://ggu.edu/school/school-of-law/
- ABA profile: Golden Gate University School of Law

Golden Gate University School of Law (informally referred to as GGU School of Law, GGU Law and Golden Gate Law) is the law school of Golden Gate University. Located in downtown San Francisco, California, Golden Gate Law is part of a California non-profit corporation and was fully accredited by the American Bar Association (ABA). On November 30, 2023, the law school announced that it would discontinue its J.D. program at the end of the academic year, following years of financial hardship and non-compliance with the ABA's two-year bar pass rate requirement. To allow students enrolled in 2023 to complete their studies, the school's ABA accreditation was extended to July 1, 2027, but not thereafter.

== History ==
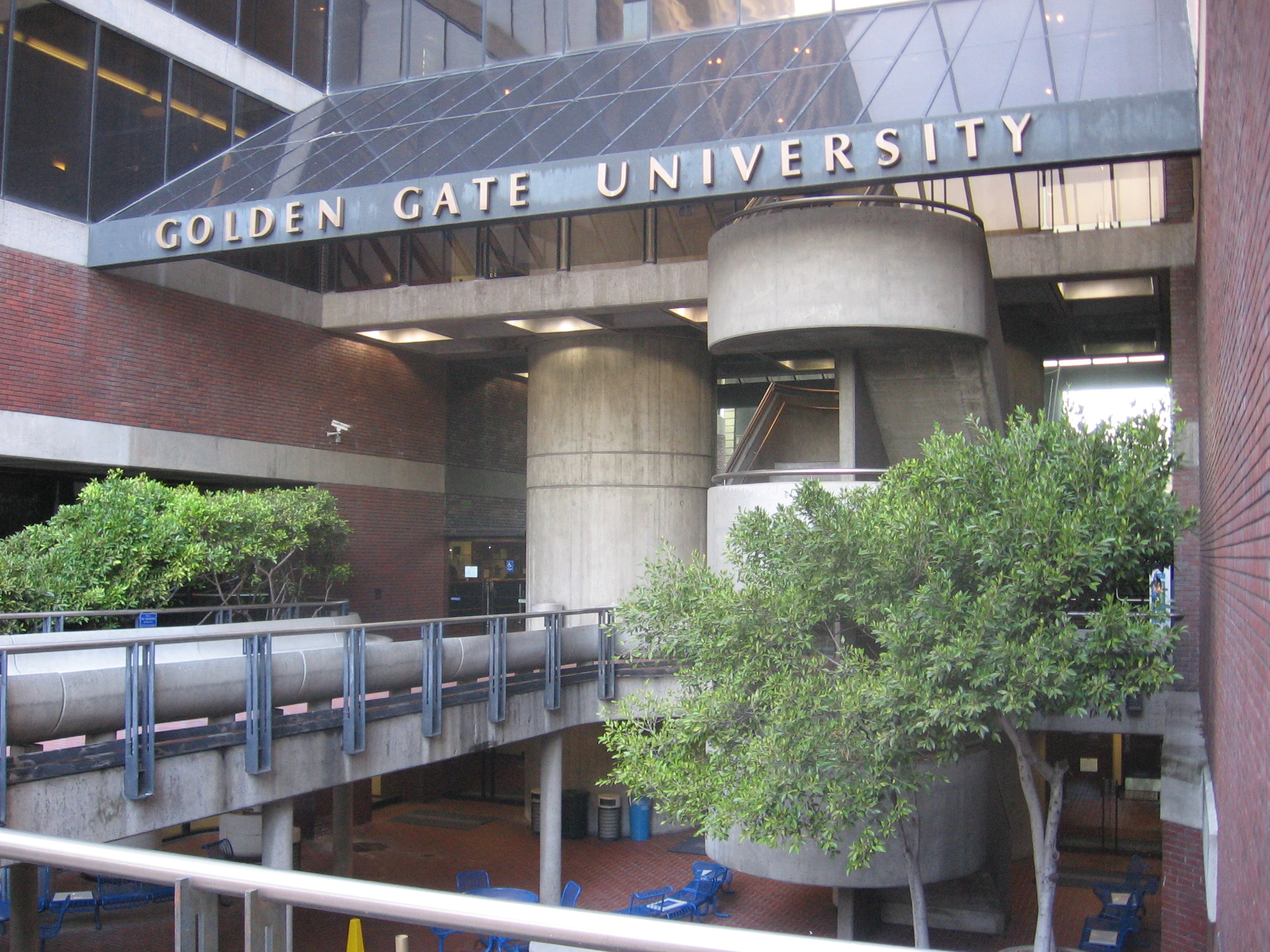
Mission Street entrance to GGU's campus

Golden Gate Law was founded in the autumn of 1901 as the YMCA Evening Law School, offering the first evening law program in the state of California. Like other YMCA law schools across the nation, it was established to provide full-time workers the opportunity to attend law school at night. The first graduating class in June 1905 had four male students.

As a component of the San Francisco Central YMCA, classes were held in the YMCA's five-story building at the northeast corner of Mason and Ellis Streets in the Tenderloin until it was destroyed in the 1906 San Francisco earthquake. After the earthquake, the school was conducted out of tents and later leased space at 1220 Geary Street, now Geary Boulevard, in the Western Addition.

On June 1, 1910, the school was incorporated as the "YMCA Law College" for the purpose of conferring LL.B degrees under authority of law. In November 1910, the Law College moved with the YMCA to its purpose-built home at 220 Golden Gate Ave in the Tenderloin. Law College's graduates enjoyed the diploma privilege from 1915 to its abolition in 1917.

In 1923, the Law College and the YMCA's local educational programs incorporated as "Golden Gate College," separating from the San Francisco Central YMCA. The college became fully independent of the YMCA in 1962. In December 1964, the school moved to its present location, a 1924 warehouse known as the "Allyne Building" at 536 Mission Street near 1st Street in the South of Market, with the rest of the college moving there in June 1968. In September 1966, the law school added a full-time three-year day program. Following the national trend, the school replaced the Bachelor of Laws (LL.B) with the Doctor of Jurisprudence (JD) on December 1, 1967, effective spring 1968.

The law school held provisional accreditation from the ABA from 1956 until full approval was granted in 1971. In 1972, the college elevated to university status and became "Golden Gate University," with "Golden Gate University School of Law" as its law school. A new "west wing" of the university was completed in 1979, where most of the school's classroom space is now located.

In 2019, Golden Gate Law received notice that it was not in compliance with ABA Standard 316, which requires accredited law schools to have a two-year bar pass rate of at least 75% or lose accreditation. On November 30, 2023, the law school announced that it would discontinue its J.D. program at the end of the current academic year, following years of financial hardship and non-compliance with the ABA's two-year bar pass rate requirement. Lawsuits have followed, including demands that the school stay open; but, in mid-September 2024, the San Francisco Superior Court denied a motion for an injunction against closing the program. The school's teachout program involves full-time students transferring to the University of San Francisco School of Law, and part-time students transferring to the Mitchell Hamline School of Law.

== Academics ==
=== Admissions ===
For the class entering in 2023, Golden Gate Law accepted 22.43% of applicants while only 10.92% of those accepted enrolled with the average enrollee having a 153 LSAT score and 3.28 undergraduate GPA.

=== Degrees ===
The school announced on November 30, 2023, that it would discontinue its J.D. program at the end of the academic year, following years of financial hardship and non-compliance with the ABA's two-year bar pass rate requirement. The school offered advanced degrees (LL.M. and S.J.D.) in intellectual property, environmental law, taxation, U.S. legal studies, and international law; however, starting in the 2024–2025 academic year, the school would not be accepting new students for enrollment in some of its LL.M. and S.J.D. programs.

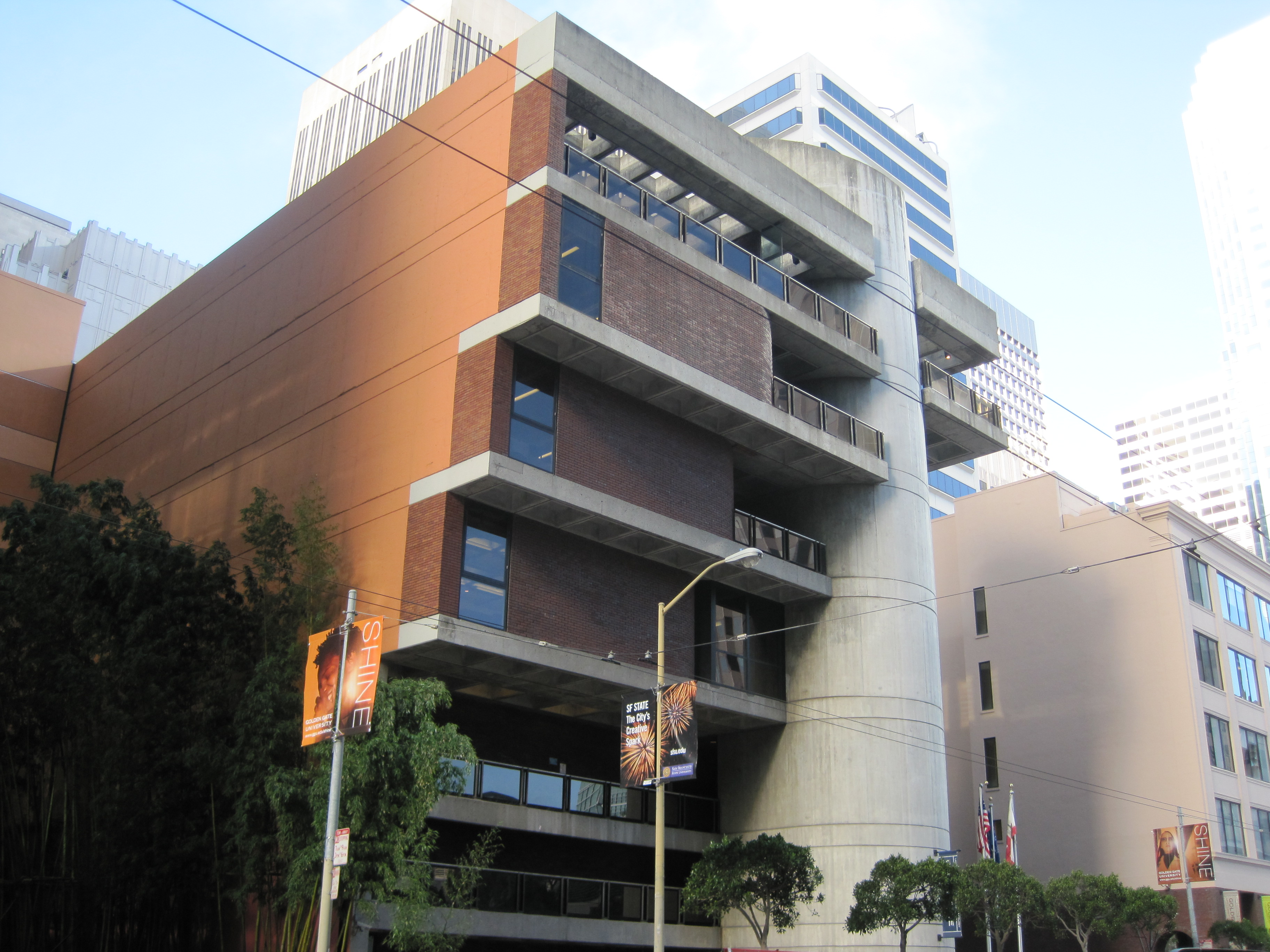
Western wing of GGU's campus

=== Clinics and programs ===
In 1978, the law school developed a graduate legal program in taxation. In the 1990s, the school developed a graduate legal program in environmental law and the International Legal Studies Program. The law school's Public Interest Scholars Program includes the Environmental Law and Justice Clinic, Veteran's Legal Advocacy Center, and the Women's Employment Rights Clinic.

In 1994, the school's Environmental Law and Justice Clinic (ELJC) was founded. The ELJC provides pro bono legal support to low-income and minority communities suffering from pollution and environmental impacts. It has received numerous awards for its collaboration with grassroots, regional, and national groups in effecting change, most notably for bringing attention to the health disparities resulting from pollution concentrated in the Bayview Hunters-Point neighborhood of San Francisco. The ELJC's work with other groups and the City of San Francisco resulted in the closure of two power plants and the prevention of other power plants from being built in Bayview-Hunters Point. In its third decade, the ELJC has focused attention on clean drinking water for low-income communities while also continuing its work to reduce air pollution and to support clients who have long made the connection between civil rights and environmental benefits and harms.

In 1998, the school established the Honors Lawyering Program through which students participate in two full-time, semester-long legal apprenticeships.

The school's clinics and programs are as follow:

- Pro Bono Tax Clinic
- Environmental Law & Justice Clinic (ELJC)
- Honors Lawyering Program (apprenticeships) (HLP)
- Summer Trial and Evidence Program (1st STEP)
- Veterans Legal Advocacy Clinic (VLAC)
- Women's Employment Rights Clinic (WERC)

== Accreditation ==
The school was provisionally or fully accredited by the American Bar Association (ABA) since August 1956. Golden Gate graduates qualify to take the bar exam in all 50 states and the District of Columbia. Golden Gate held only provisional accreditation from the ABA longer than any other law school in history, from August 30, 1956, until full approval was granted on July 6, 1971. In 2019, Golden Gate received notice that it was not in compliance with ABA Standard 316, which requires accredited law schools to have a two-year bar pass rate of at least 75% or lose accreditation. For 2020, Golden Gate had a two-year pass rate of 62.71%. On November 30, 2023, the law school announced that it would discontinue its J.D. program at the end of the academic year, following years of financial hardship and non-compliance with the ABA's two-year bar pass rate requirement. To allow students enrolled in 2023 to complete their studies, the school's ABA accreditation was extended to July 1, 2027, but not thereafter.

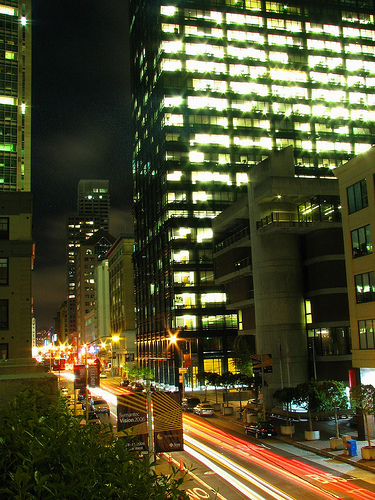
GGU's San Francisco campus at night

The school was approved by the Committee of Bar Examiners of the State Bar of California in 1940. It was also a member of the Association of American Law Schools (AALS). On an institution-wide basis, Golden Gate University has been accredited by the Western Association of Schools and Colleges (WASC) since 1959. The university has been accredited by what is now the Northwest Association of Accredited Schools since 1950.

== Bar passage rates ==
45.38% of Golden Gate graduates who took a bar examination for the first time in 2022 passed. That year 49% of Golden Gate first-time takers passed the California bar vs. a statewide first-time average of 66%, an ABA national first-time average of 72.69%, and a 75% first-time average for passage of the California bar by graduates of ABA-approved California law schools. Golden Gate ranked seventeenth and next-to-last (missing last place by one percentage point) among ABA-approved California law schools. In 2019, Golden Gate received notice that it was not in compliance with ABA Standard 316, which requires accredited law schools to have a two-year bar pass rate of at least 75% or lose accreditation. For 2020, Golden Gate had a two-year bar pass rate of 62.71%.

== Cost of attendance ==
The total cost of attendance (indicating the cost of tuition, fees, and living expenses) for continuing students at Golden Gate Law for the 2018–2019 academic year was $77,750.

== Post-graduation employment ==
According to Golden Gate Law's official 2023 ABA-required employment disclosures, within nine months of graduation 39.83% of the Class of 2022 obtained full-time, long-term employment in positions that required bar passage (i.e., as attorneys), while 33.05% of the class obtained some other form of employment, and 27.12% of graduates were unemployed and seeking employment.

== Rankings ==
For 2024, the law school is ranked 180–196 overall out of 196 law schools (the bottom 8% at most) and tied for #60 out of 70 schools in part-time law (the bottom 14%) by U.S. News & World Report.

== Notable people ==
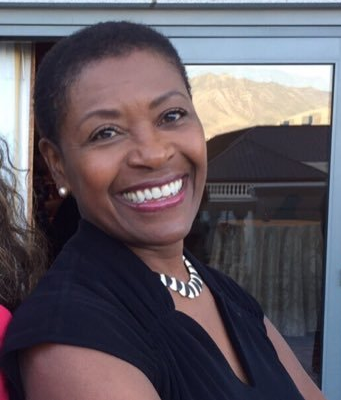
Diana Becton (JD 1985)

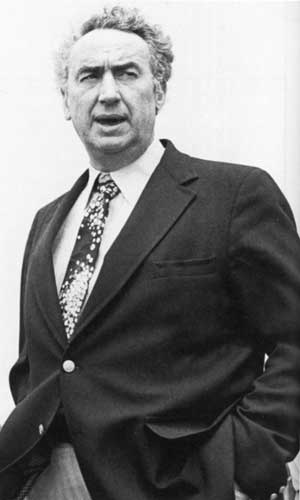
Phillip Burton (LL.B 1952) (deceased)

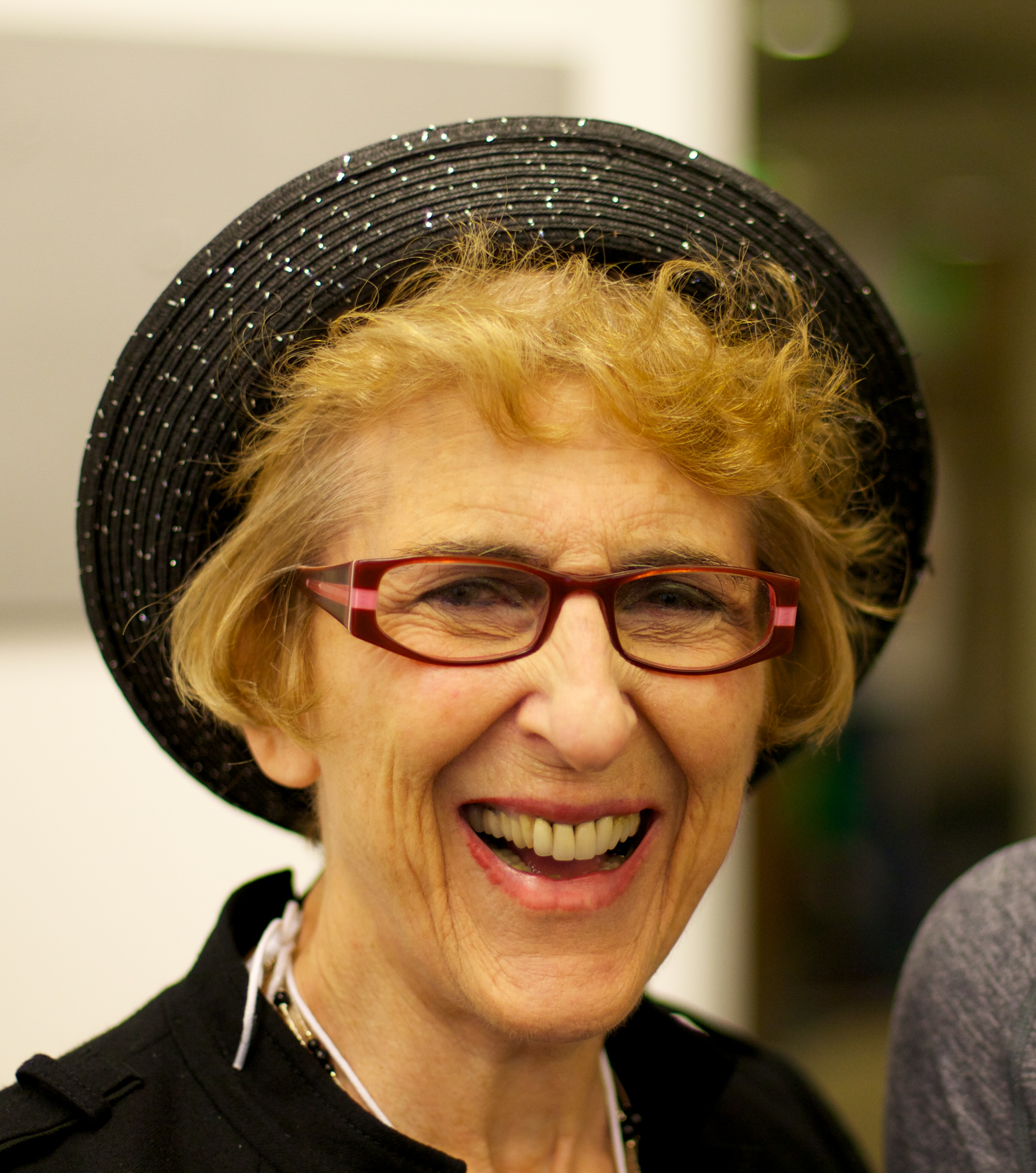
Carol Ruth Silver former Golden Gate faculty member

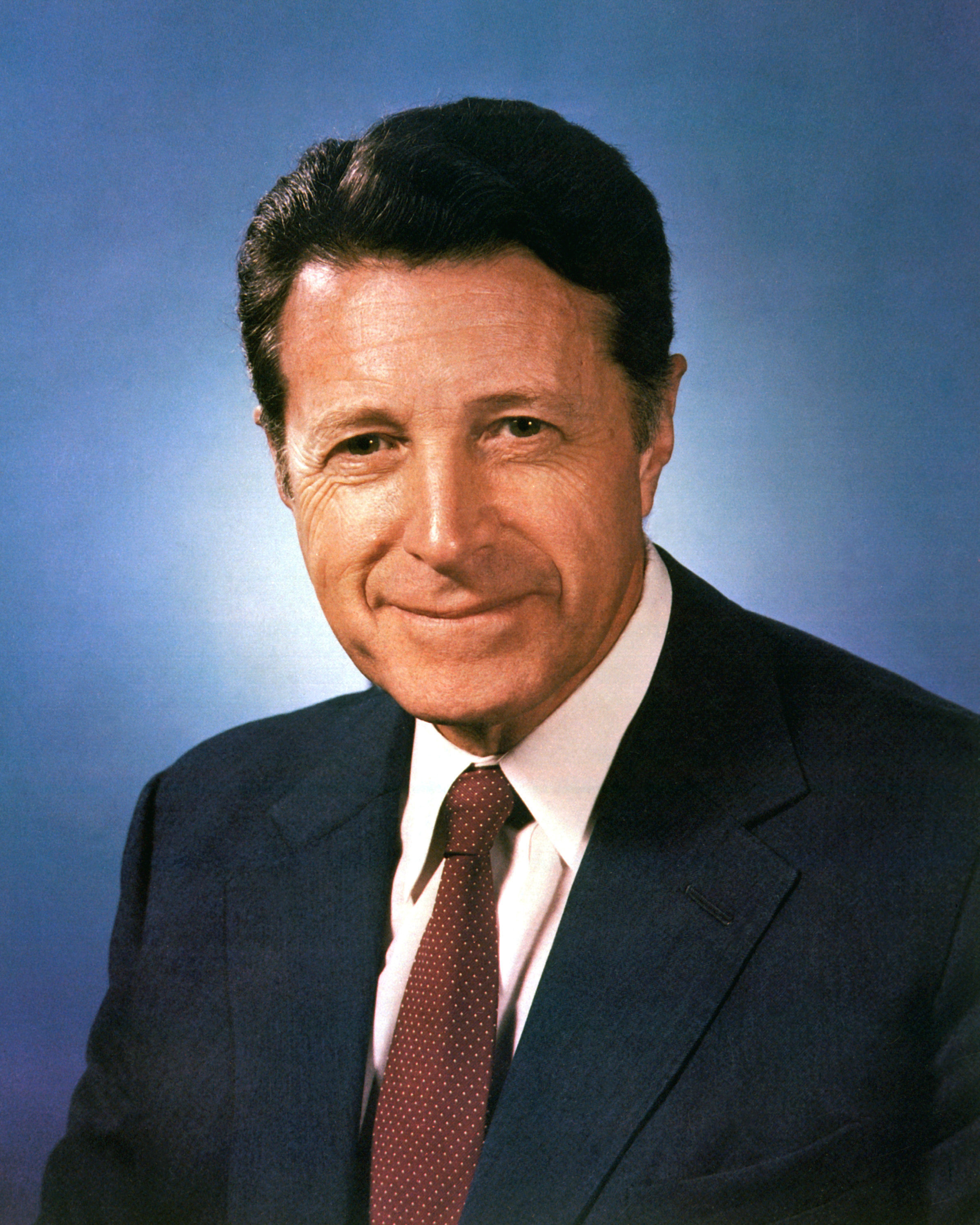
Caspar Weinberger (deceased) former Golden Gate instructor (pre-1966)

=== Alumni ===
- Diana Becton (JD 1985), district attorney of Contra Costa County (2017–present)
- Joan Blades (JD 1980), computer software entrepreneur, political activist, author, and co-founder of MoveOn.org
- David Briley (JD 1995), former 8th mayor of Nashville, Tennessee (2018–19), former vice mayor of Nashville (2015–18)
- Phillip Burton (LL.B. 1952) (deceased), former member U.S. House of Representatives (1964–83), former California State Assembly member (1957–64)
- Jesse W. Carter (JD 1913) (deceased), former associate justice of the Supreme Court of California (1939–59), former member of the California State Senate from the 5th district (1939–39)
- Morgan Christen (JD 1986), judge of the United States Court of Appeals for the Ninth Circuit (2012–present), former associate justice of the Alaska Supreme Court (2009–12)
- Peter Corroon (JD 1995), former 2nd Mayor of Salt Lake County, Utah (2004–13), former chair of the Utah Democratic Party (2014–17)
- Gary W. Goldstein (JD 1978), author, speaker, filmmaker, and producer of Pretty Woman
- C. J. Goodell (LL.B. 1909) (deceased), former associate justice of the California Court of Appeal’s First District (1945–1953)
- Cem Kaner (JD 1994), software engineering professor, co-founder of Association for Software Testing
- G. Randy Kasten (JD 1982), attorney and author
- Linda J. LeZotte (LL.M. 1983), director of the Santa Clara Valley Water District (2010–present), former San Jose City Council member (1998–2006)
- George Malek-Yonan (1964, attended) (deceased), Iranian Assyrian international attorney, politician, and athlete
- Bruce William Nickerson (JD), civil rights and gay rights attorney, a leading authority on lewd conduct law
- Cindy Ossias (JD 1983), lawyer and California Department of Insurance whistleblower
- Philip M. Pro (JD 1972), former judge of the United States District Court for the District of Nevada (1987–2015)
- Ira P. Rothken (JD 1992), high technology attorney and computer scientist
- Mike Terrizzi (JD 1981), community association lawyer and former Purdue quarterback
- Hanna Thompson (JD 2013), attorney and 2008 Olympics silver-medalist fencer
- Gertrude Tokornoo (LLM 2011), Chief Justice of Ghana
- Paul Traub (JD 1977), bankruptcy and business lawyer

=== Faculty ===
- Rebecca Bauer-Kahan, former law school professor, California State Assemblymember from the 16th district (2018–present)
- Colin Crawford, former dean of Golden Gate University School of Law (2021–23)
- George N. Crocker, former dean of Golden Gate University School of Law (1934–41)
- Thelton Henderson, former associate law professor (1978–80), inactive judge of the United States District Court for the Northern District of California (1980–present; inactive)
- Gerald Sanford Levin (deceased), former law school instructor (pre-1966), former judge of the United States District Court for the Northern District of California (1969–71) and San Francisco County Superior Court
- Andrew McClurg, former visiting law professor (1991–92), legal humorist
- Shannon Minter, former instructor, civil rights attorney, and legal director of the National Center for Lesbian Rights
- Anthony Niedwiecki, former dean of Golden Gate University School of Law (2017–2020), former Vice-Mayor of Oakland Park, FL, co-founder of the lesbian, gay, bisexual and transgender lobby group Fight OUT Loud
- Cecil F. Poole (deceased), former law school instructor (1952–1958), former judge of the United States Court of Appeals for the Ninth Circuit (1979–97) and United States District Court for the Northern District of California (1976–80), United States Attorney for the Northern District of California (1961–70)
- Carol Ruth Silver, former law school professor, former attorney, former member of the San Francisco Board of Supervisors (1978–89), member of Freedom Riders, civil liberties activist
- Lidia S. Stiglich, former adjunct law professor, associate justice of the Nevada Supreme Court (2016–present), one of a few openly LGBT judges serving on U.S. state supreme courts
- Caspar Weinberger (deceased), former law school instructor (pre-1966), resigned as 15th United States Secretary of Defense (1981–87), indicted but pardoned regarding the Iran–Contra affair, 10th United States Secretary of Health and Human Services (1973–75)
- Henry Travillion Wingate, former adjunct law school instructor (1975–76), judge of the United States District Court for the Southern District of Mississippi (1985)
