= Colin Crawford (academic) =

American academic (born 1958)

16th Dean of the Golden Gate University School of Law
- In office 2021–2023
- Preceded by: Eric Christiansen (interim); Anthony Niedwiecki

24th Dean of the University of Louisville School of Law
- In office May 15, 2018 – 2021
- Preceded by: Susan Duncan (interim)
- Succeeded by: Melanie B. Jacobs

Personal details
- Born: Colin Crawford; November 17, 1958 (age 67) Denver, Colorado, U.S.
- Education: Columbia University (BA); University of Cambridge (MA); Harvard University (JD)
- Profession: Academic administrator

Colin Crawford (born November 17, 1958) is an American academic and dean of the William H. Bowen School of Law at the University of Arkansas at Little Rock.

== Education ==
Crawford earned his Bachelor of Arts from Columbia University in 1980, a Master of Arts degree from the University of Cambridge, and a Juris Doctor from Harvard Law School.

== Career ==
On February 18, 2021, Golden Gate University announced it had hired Crawford as the new dean of its law school.

Crawford became dean of the University of Louisville School of Law on January 1, 2018. He was named Dean after a search that lasted nearly five years.

Prior to his position in Louisville, he was the Robert C. Cudd Professor of Environmental Law at Tulane University Law School in New Orleans, Louisiana from 2010 to 2017. He has also taught at Georgia State University College of Law from 2003 to 2010, Thomas Jefferson School of Law from 1997 to 2003, and Brooklyn Law School from 1992 to 1997.
