= Adam Winkler =

American legal scholar (born 1967)

- Born: July 25, 1967 (age 59); Los Angeles, U.S.
- Education: Georgetown University (BS); New York University (JD); University of California Los Angeles (MA)
- Occupations: Attorney; Law professor
- Parent: Irwin Winkler
- Website: Official website

Adam Winkler (born July 25, 1967) is the Connell Professor of Law at the UCLA School of Law. He is the author of We the Corporations: How American Businesses Won Their Civil Rights and Gunfight: The Battle over the Right to Bear Arms in America. His work has been cited in judicial opinions, including in Supreme Court cases pertaining to the First and Second Amendments.

== Early life and education ==
Winkler, born and raised in Los Angeles, is the youngest son of film producer Irwin Winkler. As a child, he had small acting parts in movies, including Martin Scorsese's New York, New York (1977).

He holds a Bachelor of Science in foreign service from Edmund A. Walsh School of Foreign Service, a Juris Doctor from New York University School of Law, and a master's degree in political science from UCLA, where he studied under Karen Orren.

== Professional career ==
Winkler practiced with Howard Weitzman and represented Michael Jackson in his defense against charges of sexual assault. He also served as a law clerk to judge David Thompson of the U.S. Court of Appeals for the Ninth Circuit from 1995 to 1996.

Winkler was the John M. Olin fellow at the University of Southern California Law School from 2001 to 2002. He has taught at UCLA School of Law since 2002, receiving tenure in 2007.

== Scholarship ==
Winkler's book We the Corporations: How American Businesses Won Their Civil Rights was a finalist for the 2018 National Book Award for Nonfiction, the National Book Critics Circle Award, the American Bar Association's Silver Gavel Award, the California Book Award, and received the Scribes Book Award. The book describes the corporate rights movement: the two-hundred year effort by business corporations to achieve the same constitutional rights as ordinary people, culminating in the Supreme Court's ruling in Citizens United v. FEC. We the Corporations was listed as a Best or Notable Book of 2018 by the New York Times, the Washington Post, the Economist, the San Francisco Chronicle, and the Seattle Times.

Winkler's writing on the right to bear arms, which recognizes both the individual right to possess firearms and the legitimacy of effective gun control, has been cited by the U.S. Supreme Court and numerous lower courts. His book Gunfight: The Battle over the Right to Bear Arms in America details the history of the right to bear arms and efforts to balance gun rights with gun safety laws in the United States since the country's founding.

Winkler has written on legal history topics, such as the origins of campaign finance law, the women's suffrage movement, and the regulation of political parties. He has also done quantitative research on constitutional law issues, including a study which challenged the legal maxim that strict scrutiny is "'strict' in theory, but fatal in fact," finding that federal courts upheld laws when applying the test in approximately 25% of cases. Along with historian Leonard Levy and UCLA School of Law professor Kenneth Karst, Winkler edited the six-volume Encyclopedia of the American Constitution.

== Awards and honors ==
Winkler has won awards and honors for his work including the Scribes Book Award. His book We the Corporations also made him a finalist for the 2018 National Book Award for Nonfiction, the National Book Critics Circle Award, the American Bar Association's Silver Gavel Award, the California Book Award. In 2018, his alma mater, NYU, awarded him its Law Teaching Award, which is given to teachers for their scholarship and dedication to the education and training of law students. Winkler also currently serves on the board of directors at the Brennan Center for Justice.
