= We the Corporations =

2018 book by Adam Winkler

- First edition
- Author: Adam Winkler
- Language: English
- Subject: United States constitutional law, history of business
- Publisher: W. W. Norton
- Publication date: February 27, 2018
- Publication place: United States
- Pages: 496 pp.
- ISBN: 978-0-87140-712-2

We the Corporations: How American Businesses Won Their Civil Rights is a book-length history of American corporate personhood and other rights of corporations written by constitutional law professor Adam Winkler and published by W. W. Norton in 2018.

The title was a 2018 National Book Award for Nonfiction finalist.

The book won the 2019 Scribes Book Award from the American Society of Legal Writers.

== See also ==
- Citizens United v. FEC
