= Melanie B. Jacobs =

American legal scholar and administrator

27th Dean of the University of Louisville School of Law
- Incumbent
- Assumed office July 2022
- Preceded by: Colin Crawford

Dean of the Michigan State University College of Law
- Interim
- In office January 2020 – June 2021
- Preceded by: Lawrence Ponoroff
- Succeeded by: Linda Sheryl Greene

Personal details
- Education: Columbia University (BA); Boston University (JD); Temple University (LLM)
- Profession: Academic administrator

Melanie B. Jacobs is an American legal scholar and administrator. She served as the interim dean of Michigan State University College of Law and was appointed 27th dean of the University of Louisville School of Law.

== Biography ==
Jacobs received her A.B. from Columbia University, her J.D. from Boston University, and LL.M. from Temple University. She joined Michigan State University College of Law's faculty in 2002 and served in a number of administrative positions. She served as interim dean from January 2020 to June 2021. She was appointed 25th dean of the University of Louisville School of Law in March 2022. She also taught at Temple University Beasley School of Law and Boston University School of Law.

Jacobs' scholarship focuses on family law and advocates for legal recognition of non-traditional families and changes to traditional parent-child relationships due to increased use of assisted reproductive technologies.
