= Henry Vits =

American politician

Henry Vits (January 21, 1842 – December 7, 1921) was an American businessman and politician.

Born in Rheydt, Prussia, Vits emigrated with his parents to the United States in 1855 and settled in Manitowoc, Wisconsin. Vits owned a grist mill and was involved with the tannery business. In 1898, Vits started the Manitowoc Aluminum Novelty Company in Manitowoc, which eventually merged into the combined Mirro Aluminum Company. Vits served as postmaster in Manitowoc during the administration of President Grover Cleveland. He also served on the school board, the Manitowoc Common Council, and the Manitowoc County Board of Supervisors. In 1878, Vits served in the Wisconsin State Assembly. He died suddenly of a stroke at his home in Manitowoc.
