= University of Louisville Law Review =

- Discipline: Law
- Language: English
- Edited by: Amy Armstrong-Reyes

Publication details
- History: 1961-present
- Publisher: The Editorial Board (United States)
- Frequency: Quarterly

Standard abbreviations
- Bluebook: U. Louisville L. Rev.
- ISO 4: Univ. Louisv. Law Rev.

Indexing
- ISSN: 1531-0183

Links
- Journal homepage

The University of Louisville Law Review is the law journal of the University of Louisville School of Law. It was established in 1961 and is the principal publication of the University of Louisville Brandeis School of Law. The Editorial Board and Staff of the Law Review publish three issues per year and have complete editorial control of its content and publication. In March 2013, Washington & Lee University School of Law ranked the University of Louisville Law Review among the top one-third of all law journals nationally. Additionally, the journal ranks in the top quarter of all law journals in terms of annual citations to its publications.

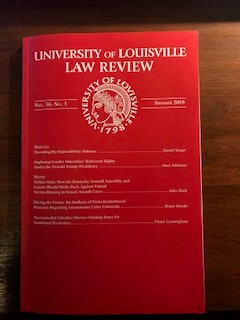
The University of Louisville Law Review, Summer 2018.
