= Joseph Koenig =

American lawyer

- Born: April 21, 1858; Neisse, Germany
- Died: November 15, 1929 (aged 71); Manitowoc, Wisconsin
- Known for: Founding of Mirro and Metal Ware

Joseph Koenig (April 21, 1858 – November 15, 1929) was a German-American lawyer, educator, businessman, manufacturer, and prolific inventor who lived most of his life in Manitowoc, Wisconsin.

== Early life ==
Joseph Koenig was born near Niesse, Germany, the seventh of nine children of Josef and Magdalena Koenig. His father died in his native country and subsequently his mother came to the United States with her children in 1872, settling in Two Rivers, Wisconsin.

Koenig went to Indianapolis, Indiana in 1873 at the age of 15 and worked as a painter and decorator. In 1880 he moved to Milwaukee, Wisconsin and attended the Normal College of the American Gymnastic Union, for a one-year course of study, graduating in 1881.

In 1881, he moved to Louisville, Kentucky where he taught for three years while also attending the University of Louisville School of Law. He graduated in 1884. Mr. Koenig was married to Miss Emma Susanna Kraft in Louisville, Kentucky, November, 1884. He and his wife had two children, Remus (1885–1955) and Ruby (1887–1968).

In 1884 he move to Wichita, Kansas where he was admitted to the bar in the state of Kansas, and practiced law for several years, and also speculated in real estate.

In 1886, Koenig co-founded a vinegar factory that operated after he moved from Wichita until 1970.

In 1884, he formed a partnership in Wichita, Kansas named Adams and Koenig, for cutting and dressing stone and selling bricks and plaster. This company only lasted 2 weeks and resulted in a lawsuit that was appealed to the Kansas Supreme Court.

A business decline left him bankrupt and in 1891 he moved to Chicago, Illinois.

After moving to Chicago he taught for three years. During that time he became interested in aluminum ware. At his request his cousin, Arthur Reymond, exhibited some of this aluminum ware at the World's Fair in 1893. Koenig made similar exhibits in San Francisco and St. Louis. Most of the goods he displayed were imported from Germany. Due to the success he had in selling the goods, he decided to start manufacturing aluminum goods in the United States.

== Aluminum era ==
In 1895 he returned to Wisconsin to found the Aluminum Manufacturing Co. at Two Rivers. This company, the first aluminum fabricating plant in Wisconsin, was merged with other firms in 1909 to become the Aluminum Goods Manufacturing Company. The name of the company was changed to Mirro Aluminum Company in 1957. Before its closure in 2003, it was the largest aluminum cookware company in the world.

He also cofounded the Two Rivers Coal Company in 1899. The coal company was sold to the C. Reiss Coal Company in 1913. C. Reiss later became part of Koch Industries as a subsidiary of Koch Carbon.

In 1905 he cofounded The Wisconsin Automobile Supply which provided tires, repairs and accessories so that automobile owners would not have to order them from Milwaukee or Chicago.

Joseph also cofounded the Metal Ware Corporation in 1920. The Metal Ware Corporation is still operating and is current owner of the NESCO brand.

Koenig held numerous patents on aluminum products, including the U.S. army canteen used during World War I. His first patent was issued when he was 18. His production of patents started 21 years later and continued for almost 30 years up until the year before his death.

== Retirement and personal life ==
He retired from active business life shortly before his death, and lived in Two Rivers, Wisconsin.

Koenig was a lifelong physical fitness enthusiast and advocate, as evidenced by his choice of schools and his association with gymnasiums and a natatorium. This began with his attendance at the American Gymnastic Union from 1880 to 1881. This school was moved in 1907 to the Athenæum in Indianapolis and had a strong emphasis on physical exercise, anatomy, and physics. The school was incorporated into Indiana University in 1941. He continued with his association with the Turner Movement as an instructor at the Turnverein in Indianapolis, and later as the director. His association with the turners continued after his move to Wichita, Kansas in 1884. Koenig constructed a natatorium in 1889 and operated it until he moved from Wichita.

Joseph Koenig was an avid outdoorsman and the society columns in the local newspapers often carried reports of his hunting trips.

Mr Koenig was an early example of a technophile. He owned the first practical automobile in Manitowoc County and in 1922 owned the first practical radiophone.

He was a Blue Lodge Mason and a member of the Elks.

When the Two Rivers School system opened a new grade school in 1931, the school was named the Joseph Koenig School. The school is currently called Koenig Elementary School.

== List of patents ==
1. U.S. patent 203,923 - Awning - 21 May 1878
2. U.S. patent 633,696 - Comb-cutting machine - 26 September 1899
3. U.S. patent 633,721 - Making metal combs - 1899
4. U.S. patent 633,722 - Grinding, polishing, or buffing machine - 1899
5. U.S. patent 639,742 - Grinding, polishing, or buffing machine - 1899
6. U.S. patent 648,498 - Grinding, polishing, or buffing machine - 1900
7. U.S. patent 648,499 - Grinding, polishing, or buffing machine - 1900
8. U.S. patent 648,500 - Comb-pointing machine - 1900
9. U.S. patent 648,759 - Comb-tooth-beveling machine - 1900
10. U.S. patent 662,536 - Grinding, polishing, or buffing machine - 1900
11. U.S. patent 677,158 - Comb-filing tool - 1901
12. U.S. patent D36175 - Design for a comb - 1902
13. U.S. patent 739,324 - Fish-net float - 1903
14. U.S. patent 744,768 - Comb - 1903
15. U.S. patent 770,863 - Biggin - 1904
16. U.S. patent 780,041 - Fish-net float - 1905
17. U.S. patent 780,042 - Fish-net float - 1905
18. U.S. patent 797,125 - Bill-file - 1905
19. U.S. patent 827,733 - Making combs - 1906
20. U.S. patent 855,063 - Fish-net float - 1907
21. U.S. patent 1,032,841 - Spouted vessel - 1912
22. U.S. patent 1,062,716 - Flask for liquids - 1913
23. U.S. patent 1,111,840 - Internal-combustion engine - 1914
24. U.S. patent 1,111,841 - Internal-combustion engine - 1914
25. U.S. patent 1,127,642 - Internal-combustion engine - 1915
26. U.S. patent 1,162,374 - Drawing-press - 1915
27. U.S. patent 1,165,421 - Making spouts - 1915
28. U.S. patent 1,183,077 - Compressor - 1916
29. U.S. patent 1,265,092 - Internal-combustion engine - 1918
30. U.S. patent 1,292,615 - Heat-economizer - 1919
31. U.S. patent 1,300,416 - Heating apparatus - 1919
32. U.S. patent RE14641 - Flask for liquids - 1919
33. U.S. patent 1,330,478 - Heating apparatus - 1920
34. U.S. patent 1,330,479 - Means for securing handles and the like to receptacles - 1920
35. U.S. patent 1,369,672 - Propelling device - 1921
36. U.S. patent 1,436,316 - Match box and ash tray for automobiles - 21 November 1922
37. U.S. patent 1,438,639 - Percolator - 12 December 1922
38. U.S. patent 1,459,289 - Percolator - 19 June 1923
39. U.S. patent 1,541,414 - Electrically Heated percolator - 9 June 1923
40. U.S. patent 1,561,084 - Turbine-engine rotor and method of making the same - 10 November 1925
41. U.S. patent 1,596,543 - Hot-air engine - 17 August 1926
42. U.S. patent 1,600,733 - Toy turbine engine - 21 September 1926
43. U.S. patent 1,600,734 - Hot-air turbine - 21 September 1926
44. U.S. patent 1,603,779 - Hot-air motor - 19 October 1926
45. U.S. patent 1,607,282 - Hot-air turbine - 16 November 1926
46. U.S. patent 1,611,755 - Hot-air engine - 21 December 1926
47. U.S. patent 1,613,038 - Hot-air engine - 4 January 1927
48. U.S. patent 1,614,961 - Hot-air motor - 18 January 1927
49. U.S. patent 1,614,962 - Hot-air engine - 18 January 1927
50. U.S. patent 1,618,594 - Hot-air motor - 22 February 1927
51. U.S. patent 1,644,256 - Hot-air motor - 4 October 1927
52. U.S. patent 1,678,396 - Heater for hot-air engines - 24 July 1928
