= Sacred Heart Academy (Louisville) =

Location
- 3175 Lexington Road; Louisville, (Jefferson County), Kentucky 40206; United States; 38°14′57″N 85°40′30″W

Information
- Type: Private, All-Girls
- Religious affiliation: Catholic
- Founded: 1877
- President: Dr. Karen McNay
- Principal: Dr. Tim Adams
- Grades: 9–12
- Gender: female
- Colors: Navy, white, and red
- Mascot: Valkryies
- Nickname: Valkyries
- Rival: Assumption High School
- Accreditation: Southern Association of Colleges and Schools
- Newspaper: The Rune
- Yearbook: The Angeline
- Athletic Director: Donna Moir
- Website: https://sha.shslou.org/

Sacred Heart Academy is an all-girls Catholic high school in Louisville, Kentucky. It is located in the Archdiocese of Louisville. Sacred Heart Academy was founded in 1877 and is a sponsored school of the Ursuline Sisters of Louisville. It has been named a Blue Ribbon School of Excellence twice and is an International Baccalaureate (IB) World School. It first achieved International Baccalaureate (IB) World School status in 1997. It is one of only two schools in the city and the only Catholic school in the state to offer IB.

== History ==
Sacred Heart Academy's history began in 1858, when a request for teachers from the Ursuline Sisters of Germany came from Louisville, KY. Three young Ursulines answered the request, traveling to Louisville to teach German immigrant children at St. Martin's school. By 1859, the Sisters had established Ursuline Academy at the corner of Shelby and Chestnut streets. In 1864, the Sisters incorporated the Ursuline Society and Academy of Education. In the 1870s, more space was needed to accommodate the growing number of sisters, students, and boarders. The community purchased property on Workhouse Road (later known as the Lexington Road campus). In 1877, classes began in an existing farmhouse, and the Academy of the Sacred Heart opened for grades 1 through 12. In 1924, The Academy became two schools: Sacred Heart Academy, a high school for girls, and Sacred Heart Model School, a grade school for boys and girls.

== Athletics ==
Sacred Heart Academy has earned over 100 team state titles in its history. The on-campus athletic facility includes a gym, fitness center, five tennis courts, a regulation track, a softball field, two natural grass fields, and one synthetic turf field. More than 50% of the student body participates in one or more of the 15 sports offered.

== Ursuline Sisters ==
The Ursuline Sisters of Louisville, Kentucky, are an apostolic religious congregation of the Catholic Church, rooted in the spirit and tradition of Saint Angela Merici. Teaching Christian Living is the corporate ministry of the Ursuline Sisters.

== Core values ==
Sacred Heart Academy teaches the Ursuline Core Values of community, reverence, service, and leadership. Community is taught over the course of students' freshman year, reverence for their sophomore, service for their junior, and leadership for their senior.

== Notable alumni ==
- Grace Berger (born 1999), WNBA basketball player
- Caroline Burckle (born 1986), Olympic swimmer
- Jennifer Carpenter (born 1979), actress
- Susan Duncan, academic administrator and lawyer
- Leigh Ann Fetter (born 1969), Olympic swimmer
- Brooke Forde (born 1999), Olympic swimmer
- Mary T. Meagher (born 1964), Olympic swimmer
- Anne Northup (born 1948), politician
