= Harold Wren =

American lawyer and law professor

Harold G. Wren
- Born: 1921; Norfolk, Virginia
- Died: June 13, 2016 (aged 94–95)
- Other name: Hal
- Education: Columbia University (AB 1942, LLB 1948); Yale University (master's degree)
- Occupation: Dean
- Employers: the Brandeis School of Law at the University of Louisville, the Northwestern School of Law, Lewis & Clark College (1969–72), and; the T.C. Williams School of Law at the University of Richmond.
- Notable work: The Of Counsel Agreement
- Spouse: Beryl Bird
- Children: 2
- Awards: Fulbright Fellow

Harold "Hal" G. Wren (1921 – June 13, 2016) was a lawyer, law professor, and dean of three American law schools. In addition, he was the author of multiple editions of the well reviewed legal guidebook, The Of Counsel Agreement.

== Biography ==
Wren was born in Norfolk, Virginia. He grew up in Norfolk as well as in Brooklyn, New York. He served in the United States Navy during World War II. He achieved the rank of captain in the naval reserves.

Wren attended Columbia University where he received an A.B. undergraduate degree from Columbia College in 1942, Columbia Law School where he received an LL.B. law degree in 1948, and Yale University where received a master's degree. He was a Fulbright Fellow, and later wrote a number of books.

He first was a practicing attorney at the law firm of Willkie Farr & Gallagher.

Later, Wren was a law professor and dean at three law schools, including the Brandeis School of Law at the University of Louisville, the Northwestern School of Law, Lewis & Clark College (1969–72), and the T.C. Williams School of Law at the University of Richmond. As dean of the Brandeis School of Law, Wren oversaw the opening of a new wing of the law school building, "doubling the space and providing a handsome home for the law library and the Brandeis papers".

Wren also authored multiple editions of The Of Counsel Agreement, a guidebook for law offices wishing to have attorneys of counsel to the firm. Following the release of the second edition in 1999, the ABA Journal remarked that the first edition "helped thousands of lawyers and law firms enter the largely undefined area of the Of Counsel relationship".

== Personal life ==
Wren married Beryl Bird in 1948, with whom he had two children, both of whom became lawyers. He died on June 13, 2016, at 95 years of age.
