= Metal Ware Corporation =

American kitchen appliance manufacturer

- Type: Privately held company
- Industry: Consumer goods; SIC Code: 3634, Electric Housewares and Fans; NAICS Code: 33521102, Electric Housewares & Household Fan Manufacturing
- Predecessor: Two River Plating and Manufacturing Company
- Founded: 1920
- Headquarters: Two Rivers, Wisconsin
- Key people: Joseph Koenig; William H. Ellis II; Henry Mixa; Remis Koenig; Walter S. Marvin; Elmer Drumm, Pres 1931-1960; Wesley Drumm, Pres 1960-2017; Richard Carey; Ross Niemi
- Products: Variety of Consumer goods
- Website: www.mwcorp.com

Metal Ware Corporation is a company located in Two Rivers, Wisconsin and manufactures small kitchen appliances primarily marketing them under the NESCO and American Harvest brand names.

== History ==
=== 1927-1940 ===
Metal Ware Corporation was co-founded by Joseph Koenig, who also founded the Mirro Aluminum Company and William H Ellis II. Metal Ware filed for incorporation on August 18, 1920. The company was a successor to Two Rivers Plating which was founded by Henry Mixa in 1902. In October, 1920, property was purchased from Two River Plating and Manufacturing Company. The company's primary products were copper and nickel-plated utensils.

The 1920s saw growth in the company with employment reaching 100 by 1927. A popular product of the company was a full feature miniature stove measuring 21 inches wide, 17 inches high and only 10 inches deep. It was particularly popular with apartment dwellers. Metal Ware announced an agreement with Westinghouse Electric and Manufacturing Co. to sell these compact stoves. They also announced a contract with General Electric to handle their stoves for export trade.

In addition to several different sizes of electric ranges, they were also producing electric percolators and educational toys including an electric power 'steam' engine. In the first seven years of existence, the company grew enough that they were advertising that they were the 'Worlds Biggest Electrical Toy Factory".

In 1928, Metal Ware introduced a new style of sandwich toaster with an expandable hinge and was designed to toast both sides of an assembled sandwich at the same time as well as making French toast and grilling bacon.

In December, 1931, Elmer Drumm, who had worked at the Mirro Aluminum Company, along with his brother Charles Drumm, Elmer Bleser, and Victor C. Trastek purchased Metal Ware. At the time of the purchase, the company was renamed The Metal Ware Corporation.

In 1936 the Empire line of toy trains was spun off into a separate business named Empire Products Company. The Metal Ware Corporation continued to manufacture the toys for the new company. At this time, it was also announced that they obtained a franchise for making Disney character toys from the Silly Symphonies animated short films.

As with many companies at the time, they experienced the effects of the growth of labor unions with the American Federation of Labor announcing that they completely unionized the employees of the Metal Ware Corporation in 1937.

=== 1941-1945 ===
In April 1942, The Metal Ware Corporation announced that it would have contracts for arms production.

By December 1944, essential consumer goods were in short supply and the War Production Board authorized The Metal Ware Corp to resume production of electrical appliances as materials and labor became available.

In April 1945, because of continued war production, the company began construction of a 2500 s.f. addition to their plant.

For national security reasons, plant production was often not made public until after the war was over. In 1946, it was reported that The Metal Ware Corporation had been producing electric lanterns for soldiers and electrical appliances for naval ships.

=== 1946-1980 ===
In 1950, The Metal Ware Corporation bought the assets of the Herah Electric Specialty company in Milwaukee and moved the dies, patterns and materials inventory to its Two Rivers plant. The Herah company was in the business of manufacturing electric wall heaters, electric fireplace logs, portable heaters, and fluorescent lighting specialties... They had employed fewer than a dozen people.

Business growth continued to fuel expansion. An additional 6000 s.f. of warehouse space was construction in 1952.

In the mid 1950s, metal toys continued to be a large part of the company's business making up nearly half of their production with the largest portion of that being it the miniature ranges. Other products produced include toy electric irons with ironing boards, electric trains, various small appliances marketed under the Empire name such as electric corn poppers and Lady Aristette hair dryers.

A major change came to the company in March 1960 with the passing of Elmer O. Drumm who had been president of the company since purchasing it in 1931. Elmer was succeeded in August by his son Wesley C. Drumm. He was promoted from the position of General Manager. He had been associated with the firm since 1947 and had become the sales and advertising manager in 1953.

At the end of 1964, the company reported that sales were up from previous years and had a record year for coffee makers. Continued strong growth for the company was evidenced by construction of a 1400 s.f. office space addition to their main building in 1965. By 1973 an additional office space expansion added another 3200 s.f.

A labor strike by the Aluminum Workers International Union was started on April 2, 1968, over a labor contract that expired On December 31. 1967. Negotiations for a new contract had begun the previous May. The strike lasted three weeks and ended on April 24. The new contract was to run till the end of 1970.

By the mid 1970s the product line showed a complete shift away from toys and included the Empire line of electric coffee makers and party urns, slow cookers, electric kettles, pop-corn poppers, egg cookers and poachers, hot cups, travel kits, Lady Aristette hair dryers, and the combination Kar 'N Home kits. The line of metal toys was dropped in the mid 1960s due to increasing federal safety regulations. New products introduced in 1977 included the Little Fry mini deep fryer and the Empire Travl-Mate automatic coffee maker kit.

=== 1981-2014 ===
The 1980s marked a major change in the growth in the company with a series of acquisitions of related cookware manufacturers.

In 1981, Metal ware Corporation Purchased the NESCO trade name for roaster ovens along with all dies, tooling, equipment, and finished goods inventory from the previous owners. The roasters were being manufactured in New York, but at one time had been previously manufactured in Wisconsin.

In 1985, Metal Ware purchased MIRRO Outdoor Products and began manufacturing and marketing the Open Country® line of camp cookware and in 1987 bought MAFCO (Monarch Appliance and Fabricating Company), a porcelain finishing and metal stamping facility in Algoma, Wis.

A major boost to the company began in 1991 when the QVC television shopping channel began selling their NESCO roasters on national basis. In addition to large phone sales through QVC, the national exposure expanded their access to other retail stores as customers were asking for the roasters in the stores. The exposure was also a big help with the launch of a new product, a convection roaster called the Roast-Aire. By 1997 one million units had shipped.

In 1996, it acquired a tabletop cooking grill product line from Algonquin Mercantile Corporation, a small appliance maker in Ontario, Canada, and brought that production into Wisconsin.

In 1997, it acquired a Wisconsin plastics molding company and obtained the assets of Minnesota-based American Harvest, Inc., well known for its food dehydrator. With this addition, the company created a new brand—NESCO®/American Harvest™.

Metal Ware continues to expand its product lines and find new paths to develop markets and build value. The Open Country® collection now includes a Fish Scaler, Jerky Seasonings and cooking accessories for outdoor enthusiasts, and the electrics line contains an array of pressure cookers, Jet-Steam Ovens, bread maker, food grinders and slicers, hand blenders, juicers and coffee products. In developing its coffee bean roaster, Metal Ware developed a unique method to convert the harsh odors typical of this process into the fragrance that draws coffee lovers.

The classic Roaster Oven comes in many sizes and colors. The basic design of the Spa Pro® Massage Stone Heater is based on the roaster over. The current product line includes a coffee blade grinder, coffee roasters, coffee urn, food slicers, food grinders, pressure cookers, juice blenders, water kettles, food steamers, bread machine, waffle maker, toasters, and a portable induction cooktop.

=== 2014-Present ===
In 2016, The Metal Ware Corporation merged with Chard International, an outdoor cooking and meat preparation product company, owned by Richard Carey and business partner Ross Niemi. The merger brought 14 new employees to Metal Ware. Richard Carey took over as President of Metal Ware and Ross Niemi as the COO.

The Metal Ware Corp is currently expanding, adding new brands and product lines such as Grizzly Docks and DeWALT Coolers. Along with new products, The Metal Ware Corp is also currently working to increase domestic production. To do so, Metal Ware has added three plastic injection molding machines, as well as a new plastic Roto Molding machine increasing production jobs by 50% in the last three years within their six facilities.

== Patents and Trademarks ==
As is common with many corporations, the Metal Ware Corporation applied for and was granted numerous patents for its products over the course of its existence. It has also become the assignee for patents for companies that it has acquired.

=== Utility Patents ===
1. U.S. patent 4,140,254 Canteen construction
2. U.S. patent 5,403,607 Method for Rapidly Cooking Food
3. U.S. patent 5,416,950 Cooking system and accessories
4. U.S. patent 5,420,393 Assemblies for Increasing Airflow and Heating Efficiency in a Multi-shelf Food Heading Device
5. U.S. patent 5,423,249 Food dehydrator
6. U.S. patent 5,437,108 Food dehydrator and tray for a dehydrator
7. U.S. patent 5,438,916 Cooking system and accessories
8. U.S. patent 5,465,651 Rapid cooking device
9. U.S. patent 5,466,912 Convection oven
10. U.S. patent 5,484,621 Method for rapidly cooking food
11. U.S. patent 5,513,558 Rapid cooking device
12. U.S. patent 5,520,096 Cooking system and accessories
13. U.S. patent 5,839,356 Automatic bread making machine
14. U.S. patent 5,878,508 Food dehydrator
15. U.S. patent 6,085,442 Food Dehydrator
16. U.S. patent 6,362,459 Electronically controlled roaster oven with digital control assembly
17. U.S. patent 6,558,726 Coffee bean roasting apparatus

=== Design Patents ===
1. U.S. patent D354659 Bread slicer
2. U.S. patent D355564 Convection oven
3. U.S. patent D356230 Handle for a countertop oven
4. U.S. patent D356716 Muffin holder
5. U.S. patent D357383 Convection oven
6. U.S. patent D367397 Breadmaker
7. U.S. patent D369274 Extension ring for a convection oven
8. U.S. patent D374305 Hair braiding device
9. U.S. patent D401468 Food dehydrator
10. U.S. patent D438756 Bread pan
11. U.S. patent D441251 Roaster oven with end caps
12. U.S. patent D448238 Combined roaster oven with hinged cover

=== Registered Trademarks ===
1. U.S. Trademark 71,446,436 NESCO
2. U.S. Trademark 73,244,184 MONARCH
3. U.S. Trademark 73,318,760 SIERRA
4. U.S. Trademark 73,415,135 CLEAN-A-SCREEN
5. U.S. Trademark 73,415,137 CONVERGA-FLOW
6. U.S. Trademark 73,415,191 ADD-A-TRAY
7. U.S. Trademark 73,532,035 OPEN COUNTRY
8. U.S. Trademark 73,556,565 SNACKMASTER
9. U.S. Trademark 73,666,111 GARDENMASTER
10. U.S. Trademark 73,807,094 CYCLONIC COOKING
11. U.S. Trademark 74,001,972 WEEKENDER
12. U.S. Trademark 74,237,324 JET-STREAM OVEN
13. U.S. Trademark 74,237,334 AMERICAN HARVEST
14. U.S. Trademark 74,420,885 ROAST AIR OVEN
15. U.S. Trademark 74,420,915 ROAST-AIR
16. U.S. Trademark 74,801,734 AH AMERICAN HARVEST
17. U.S. Trademark 75,031,125 NESCOTE
18. U.S. Trademark 75,041,480 CIRCLE OF HEAT
19. U.S. Trademark 75,271,565 NESCO
20. U.S. Trademark 75,330,639 SNACKMASTER VISION
21. U.S. Trademark 77,487,611 NESCO
22. U.S. Trademark 77,487,614 OPEN COUNTRY
23. U.S. Trademark 77,487,618 OPEN COUNTRY
24. U.S. Trademark 77,624,064 GRIP 'N GO
25. U.S. Trademark 78,216,075 SPA PRO
26. U.S. Trademark 78,617,093 TUMBLE DRUMM
27. U.S. Trademark 78,630,286 TUMBLE DRUMM FISH SCALER
28. U.S. Trademark 85,235,657 NESCO AH AMERICAN HARVEST
