= Paul Traub =

American attorney (born 1952)

- Born: January 31, 1952 (age 74); Brooklyn, New York, U.S.
- Education: University at Buffalo (BA); Golden Gate University (JD)

Paul R. Traub (born January 31, 1952) is an American attorney who specializes in business law, specifically bankruptcy, insolvency, and trial litigation. He has participated in several large retail bankruptcies, including Kmart, FAO Schwarz, KB Toys, Stage Stores, Office Max, and eToys.com. Other clients have included Halston, Joan & David, Levitz, Bombay Company, Linens 'n Things, Zales, and Whitehall Jewelers.

== Early life and education ==
Traub was born in Brooklyn, New York. Traub earned his Bachelor of Arts degree from the University at Buffalo in 1973, followed by a Juris Doctor from the Golden Gate University School of Law in 1977. He was admitted to the New York Bar Association in 1978.

== Career ==
He is admitted to practice law before the U.S. District Court Southern, Eastern and Western Districts of New York, the Second Circuit Court of Appeals, and Eastern District of Wisconsin.

Traub is the founding member and managing partner, of Traub, Bonacquist, and Fox, a New York-based boutique law firm specializing in bankruptcy and business reorganization matters. In September, 2006, Marc Dreier, sole equity partner of Dreier, LLP, acquired the boutique law firm. Paul Traub became a Dreier partner and co-chair with Norman Kinel of the Bankruptcy and Business Reorganization group.

Following Dreiers 2008 arrest for an alleged $700 million promissory-note fraud, Traub and the rest of the bankruptcy team resigned and re-stablished Traub, Bonacquist & Fox. In February, 2009, Epstein, Becker & Green, a firm specializing in government contracts, brought the seven-member Traub/Dreier bankruptcy team into their New York office.

Traub represented the creditors in eToys.com bankruptcy. The dotcom company filed for chapter 11 protection toward the end of the Internet bubble on March 7, 2001. The Office for United States Trustee accused him and his New York law firm of a conflict of interest, non-disclosure, and employing non "arms length" key personnel, because of his business partnership with Barry Gold. In April, 2001, Traub founded Asset Disposition Advisors, LLC ( "ADA"), a Delaware liquidation company, with Gold, located at his Manhattan law office.

Traub also appointed Gold CEO of eToys.com one month after forming ADA, while Gold had been receiving paychecks from Traub's lawfirm. The Court ruled in favor of Traub: Gold's participation in ADA with Traub was not sufficient to establish a conflict of interest, although the judge said failure to disclose such relationships in future could lead to sanctions. "In the future ... the failure of an officer of a debtor to disclose such relationships will subject that officer to review and possible disgorgement of compensation, if the court concludes that the relationship constitutes an actual conflict of interest."
