= Scribes (society) =

Legal writing organization

Scribes—The American Society of Legal Writers—is an organization dedicated to encouraging legal writers and improving legal writing throughout the entire legal community: in court, in the law office, in the publishing house, and in law school. Founded in 1953, Scribes is the oldest organization of its kind. Scribes has almost 2,700 members, including state and federal judges, practicing lawyers, law-school deans and professors, and legal editors.

Scribes' executive office is in Los Angeles, at Southwestern Law School. Before Southwestern, it was located at the University of Illinois Chicago School of Law, Texas Tech University School of Law, Thomas M. Cooley Law School, Barry University Dwayne O. Andreas School of Law, University of Arkansas School of Law, and Wake Forest University School of Law. The executive director is Bradley Yost.

== Origin ==
Scribes was formed in 1951 by Arthur T. Vanderbilt, Chief Justice of the New Jersey Supreme Court. That year he invited several like-minded lawyers to join him in creating an organization to assist those who would write about the law as well as to promote better legal writing. Membership was initially limited to members of the legal profession who had published at least one book or three articles on legal subjects; new members were required to be nominated by an existing member. Later, the eligibility requirement was reduced to one book or two articles, and nominations are no longer necessary.

== Goals ==
As written in its Constitution, Scribes' goals are:

1. to foster a feeling of fraternity among those who write about the law, and especially among its members;
2. to create an interest in writing about the history, philosophy, and language of the law and about those who make, interpret, and enforce it;
3. to help and encourage people who write about the law; and
4. above all, to promote a clear, succinct, and forceful style in legal writing.

== Publications ==
=== The Scribes Journal of Legal Writing ===
In 1990, Scribes printed its first volume of The Scribes Journal of Legal Writing. The initial circulation was 3,000 copies; its editor in chief was Bryan Garner, then a young law-school professor at the University of Texas. Today, Garner is recognized as the preeminent authority on legal writing and language.

From 2001 through 2013, the editor in chief was Professor Joseph Kimble, who is widely known for his plain-language advocacy and his work restyling the Federal Rules of Civil Procedure and Evidence. From 2013 to 2022, Professor Mark Cooney served as editor in chief. The current editor in chief is Professor Megan E. Boyd.

The Journal is widely read and cited. Its distribution exceeds 6,000 copies, and it has published articles by some of the best-known figures in legal writing, including Bryan Garner, Joseph Kimble, Charles Alan Wright, Judge Richard Posner, Lawrence M. Friedman, Richard Wydick, Reed Dickerson, Dean Darby Dickerson, Irving Younger, Steven Stark, Ken Adams, Ross Guberman, and Wayne Schiess.

Volume 13 of the Scribes Journal featured the transcripts of interviews with justices of the United States Supreme Court. The interviews were conducted by Bryan Garner.

=== The Scrivener ===
The Scrivener has been Scribes' newsletter since 1974. Originally it was used for membership updates and organizational news, but today it also includes shorter pieces about legal writing and publishing. The editor of The Scrivener is Professor Maureen Kordesh of UIC John Marshall Law School, The University of Illinois at Chicago.

=== Other publications ===
In 1960, Scribes issued Advocacy and the King's English, published by Bobbs-Merrill Company. Forty years later, the book was reissued under the title Classic Essays on Legal Advocacy, published by The Lawbook Exchange in Clark, New Jersey.

== Awards ==
=== Lifetime-Achievement Awards ===
The Scribes Lifetime-Achievement Award is presented to persons who have had a great influence on legal writing or distinguished themselves in their own writing:

- 2002 – Judge Guido Calabresi, U.S. Court of Appeals for the Second Circuit, and former Dean and Professor at Yale Law School;
- 2004 – Richard S. Arnold, Chief Judge on the U.S. Court of Appeals for the Eighth Circuit
- 2008 – Justice Antonin Scalia, Associate Justice of the United States Supreme Court
- 2009 – Justice Ruth Bader Ginsburg Associate Justice of the United States Supreme Court
- 2010 – Professor Emeritus Richard C. Wydick, in 2010, UC Davis School of Law, and author of Plain English for Lawyers (Carolina Academic Press).
- 2012 – Justice John Paul Stevens, Associate Justice of the United States Supreme Court
- 2015 – The Right Honorable Harry Woolf, Baron Woolf, Master of the Rolls from 1996 until 2000 and Lord Chief Justice of England and Wales from 2000 until 2005;
- 2016 – Frank Easterbrook, former Chief Judge of the U.S. Court of Appeals for the Seventh Circuit;
- 2016 – Former Chief Judge Richard Posner, U.S. Court of Appeals for the Seventh Circuit
- 2017 – The Honorable Robert Henry, President, Oklahoma City University
- 2018 – Chief Judge Diane Wood, U.S. Court of Appeals for the Seventh Circuit
- 2019 – Justice Stephen G. Breyer, Associate Justice of the United States Supreme Court
- 2020 – Bryan A. Garner
- 2022 – William C. Burton

=== Book Award ===
Since 1961, Scribes has presented its annual Book Award for the best legal work published during the previous year. The Scribes Book-Award Committee reviews up to 40 submissions each year, and the award is presented at Scribes' annual meeting or CLE where the author usually speaks and signs copies of the book. A list of winners of the Scribes Book Award is posted on the Scribes website.

=== Law-Review Award ===
Since 1987, Scribes has presented its annual Law-Review Award for the best student-written article published in a law review or law journal. Each year, the editors of every law review and law journal are encouraged to submit their best student-written note or comment. Volunteer legal-writing professors and attorneys review the submissions and nominate the finalists to the Scribes selection committee. The committee selects a winner. Until 2017, the award was presented during the annual meeting of the National Conference of Law Reviews. Since then, Scribes has presented the award at its Annual Meeting.

=== Brief-Writing Award ===
In 1996, Scribes began an annual Brief-Writing Award for the best student-written brief. Each year, any law student who won best brief in a regional or national moot-court competition may submit the brief to Scribes, which then honors the best of the best. As with the Law-Review Award, volunteer legal-writing professors review the articles and decide on the finalists. The Scribes committee selects a winner, who receives the award at Scribes's annual meeting or CLE.

=== National Order of Scribes ===
In 2007, Scribes created the National Order of Scribes to honor graduating law students who excel in legal writing. Each year, every law school that is an institutional member of Scribes may nominate law students to be inducted into the National Order of Scribes. As with other Scribes awards, a list of all honorees, past and present, appear on the Scribes website.

== Programs & CLEs ==
Scribes has on several occasions participated in legal-writing programs at the American Bar Association's annual meetings. In 2007, Scribes participated in the annual meeting of the Association of American Law Schools in Washington, D.C., where it presented a panel discussion on "Jury Instructions in Plain English." In 2008, Scribes teamed up with the New York City Bar Association's Legal History Committee to cosponsor a symposium on Abraham Lincoln's legal writing.

Recently, Scribes has also made a point of speaking directly to law students about legal writing. Since 2006, institutional-member law schools have hosted Scribes's annual board meetings. In return, Scribes conducts legal-writing programs for the school's students.

In 2016, Scribes began hosting annual CLEs for legal professionals. The first CLE was hosting at The John Marshall Law School in Chicago, Illinois. The second CLE was hosted in Houston, Texas.

In 2023, Scribes launched the National Conference for Law Review Editors. Held in late March or early April, this virtual conference is designed as a training session for incoming editors of student-edited law reviews and law journals.

== Membership ==
Scribes had 41 members at its first meeting in the early 1950s. Today, membership has grown to almost 2,700 members, including state and federal judges, practicing lawyers, law-school deans and professors, and legal editors. Any member of the legal profession is eligible to join.

In 1990, President Roy M. Mersky helped develop a new category of membership for law schools: institutional membership. Since then, 37 law schools have become institutional members. Once a law school becomes an institutional member, professors at those schools automatically become a Scribes member if they meet the other eligibility requirements. In the mid-2000s, institutional membership expanded to include appellate courts; once an appellate court becomes an institutional member, the judges on that court automatically become members of Scribes as well.

== Past presidents ==
- 1953–1957 Sidney Teiser
- 1957–1958 Eugene C. Gerhart
- 1958–1959 Gibson Witherspoon
- 1959–1960 Harry Gershenson
- 1960–1961 Walter P. Armstrong
- 1961–1962 William A. Schnader
- 1962–1963 Justice E.J. Dimock
- 1963–1964 Judge Charles W. Joiner
- 1964–1965 Willoughby A. Colby
- 1965–1966 Herman Finklestein
- 1966–1967 Justice Laurence Hyde
- 1967–1968 Warren V. Ludlam Jr.
- 1968–1969 Paul Wolkin
- 1969–1970 Rufus King
- 1970–1971 Eugene C. Gerhart
- 1971–1972 Sidney Bernstein
- 1972–1973 Howard L. Oleck
- 1973–1974 Jack Kleiner
- 1974–1975 James J. Brown
- 1975–1976 Bobby D. Dyess
- 1976–1977 Frederick D. Lewis
- 1977–1978 Justice William H. Erickson
- 1978–1979 Judge Edward D. Re, Chief Judge of the U.S. Customs Court (later the U.S. Court of International Trade)
- 1979–1980 H. Sol Clark
- 1980–1981 Francis L. Kenney Jr.
- 1981–1982 E. Donald Shapiro
- 1982–1983 Joseph J. Marticelli
- 1983–1984 Margaret S. Bearn
- 1984–1985 Michael Cardozo
- 1985–1986 Rudolph Hasl
- 1986–1987 Justice Charles Blackmar
- 1987–1989 Roger Billings
- 1989–1991 Kenneth A. Zick
- 1991–1993 Roy M. Mersky
- 1993–1995 Lynne P. Iannelli
- 1995–1997 Marianna Smith
- 1997–1999 Bryan A. Garner
- 1999–2001 Gary Spivey
- 2001–2003 Donald J. Dunn
- 2003–2005 Beverly Ray Burlingame
- 2005–2007 Norman Otto Stockmeyer
- 2007–2009 Stuart Shiffman
- 2009–2012 Steven R. Smith, Dean, California Western School of Law
- 2012–2015 Darby Dickerson, Dean, Texas Tech University School of Law and Innagural Dean of UIC John Marshall Law School, The University of Illinois at Chicago)
- 2015–2018 Michael B. Hyman, Justice, Illinois Appellate Court
- 2018–2020 Mark E. Wojcik, Professor, UIC John Marshall Law School, The University of Illinois at Chicago
- 2020–2022 Susan Hanley Duncan, Dean, University of Mississippi School of Law
- 2022–2024 John Browning, Distinguished Jurist in Residence, Jones Law School, Faulkner University
- 2024–2025 Darby Dickerson, President & Dean, Southwestern Law School

For a historical list of past award winners and other executive board members, see Thomas M. Steele and Norman Otto Stockmeyer, Scribes After More Than 50 Years – A History, 12 The Scribes Journal of Legal Writing 1 (2008–2009).
