= Kaisten =

Kaisten may refer to:

- Kaisten, Aargau, Switzerland
- Kaisten, Bavaria, in Wasserlosen, Germany
