= William C. Burton =

American attorney and lobbyist

- Occupations: Attorney and Lobbyist
- Employer: Sagat Burton LLP
- Known for: Founding of The Burton Awards
- Spouse: Michele Burton
- Children: 2

William C. Burton is a partner in the law firm of Sagat Burton LLP, Park Avenue, New York City. His practice is devoted primarily to lobbying for banking, financial services and insurance business interests. As an attorney, Burton has devoted a substantial part of the past 27 years to promoting the legal profession through his non-profit foundation. He is the author of the legal profession's first-ever legal thesaurus entitled Burton's Legal Thesaurus. Burton served as New York State Assistant Attorney General, as well as an Assistant New York State Special Prosecutor. Previously, Burton was Director of Government Affairs for one of the world's largest insurers, Continental Insurance.

== Early life ==
Burton grew up in Great Neck, New York, and resides in East Hills, New York. He is married to Michele Burton and has two children: Brian, a lawyer married to Rebecca Pinkus; and Marni, a celebrity make-up artist married to Jarek Gabor.

For the past 25 years, Burton has served as the Village attorney for East Hills, New York.

== The Burton Foundation and Burton Awards Program ==
In 1999, Burton established and funded the Burton Foundation, to promote the profession and practice of law. The foundation is a 501(c) (3), non-profit, academic organization. That same year, Burton founded "The Burton Awards Program" which honors and rewards the finest achievements in law. The Burton Awards is run in association with the Library of Congress, and in 2015 became co-sponsored by the American Bar Association. Each year, more than 50 leaders in law are honored at the Library of Congress in Washington, DC including professors, partners in the leading law firms, general counsel in the largest corporations in America, and members of the military. Many prominent jurists have been guest speakers, including the United States Chief Justice John Roberts. In the past, other dignitaries who have also spoken at the national awards program, included Tom Brokaw, Bob Schieffer, Tim Russert, Chris Matthews, George Will, and master of ceremonies, Bill Press. Performers have included Jay Leno, Idina Menzel, Sara Bareilles, Shin Lim, Kristen Chenoweth, Bernadette Peters, Katherine Jenkins and Vanessa Williams. The Honorary Board of Directors includes 13 United States Senators as well as judges and the nation's most prominent attorneys.

Burton is also credited with having established the Holmes Debates at the Library of Congress which featured a national debate between members of the United States Justice Department and renowned legal scholars on an issue confronting the nation.

== Published works ==
- Burton's Legal Thesaurus, 5th Edition, McGraw-Hill, 6th Edition, 40th Anniversary Publication, Lexis Publishing May, 2021 with foreword written by William O. Douglas.

Burton's Legal Thesaurus was declared "Leading Thesaurus in Law" in an in-depth empirical study, entitled "Beyond Black's and Webster's: The Persuasive Value of Thesauri in legal Research and Writing." Author Brian Craig affirmed "Burton's Legal Thesaurus as the leading legal thesaurus" based on the frequency of citations in written decisions by the Supreme Court and Federal and State Courts.

In September 2013, Burton spoke at the National Book Fair in Washington, D.C. about the reference book. A new, 6th edition celebrates the 40th anniversary since the book was first printed.

== Awards ==
In 2010, the Legal Writing Institute awarded Burton the Golden Pen Award, which is given to a recipient who has most significantly advanced the cause of better legal writing. The organization said that Burton was selected because he "has become one of the most listened to and melodic voices in the world of people who advocate for legal writing excellence."

In June of that same year, the Friends of the Law Library of Congress presented Burton with the "Blackstone Award" for exemplifying the best objectives of the Law Library of Congress and advancing the mission and activities of the Law Library of Congress. Roberta I. Shaffer, Associate Librarian of Congress said "Mr. Burton shares an unerring sense of legal excellence."

When "Burton's Legal Thesaurus" was published, The Association of Legal Publishers honored it as "One of the Most Innovative and Creative Projects of the Year."

In 2022, Burton was selected as a member of the Hofstra Law School Hall of Fame. The Law School selected its top 50 graduates on celebrating its 50th anniversary.

He was also named as the 2022 recipient of a Lifetime Achievement Award from The American Society of Legal Writers, whose members include jurists, professors, and practitioners devoted to excellence in legal writing. The award was previously presented to U.S. Supreme Court Justices Antonin Scalia, Ruth Bader Ginsburg, John Paul Stevens, and Stephen Breyer, and other prominent award winners. In 2024, Mr. Burton received the ABA Presidential Citation for visionary leadership and contributions significantly impacting the legal profession and society at large.

== Education ==
Burton attended Long Island University and obtained a BA and MA. He received a scholarship to graduate school before attending Hofstra Law School. He is admitted to both the New York and Florida Bars.
