= Mirro Aluminum Company =

Former US cookware manufacturer, now a brand owned by Groupe SEB

Mirro
- Formerly: Mirro Aluminum Company
- Industry: Consumer goods
- Founded: 1909
- Founders: Joseph Koenig and Henry Vits
- Defunct: 2003 (for the US company, but the brand still exists)
- Fate: Closed, but the brand continues
- Successor: Skana Aluminum; Northport Marine LLC; Groupe SEB
- Headquarters: 900 South 16th Street; Manitowoc, Wisconsin; United States
- Products: Variety of Consumer goods
- Owner: Groupe SEB

Mirro is an American cookware brand owned by the French consortium Groupe SEB, the world's largest cookware manufacturer, through its Colombian subsidiary IMUSA. Between 1909 and 2003, it was an American company specialising in aluminium cookware called Mirro Aluminum Company, based in Manitowoc, Wisconsin.

== History ==
=== Founding - 1940 ===
The roots of the company can be traced to the founding of three companies: the Aluminum Manufacturing Company founded by Joseph Koenig in Two Rivers, Wisconsin, in 1895; the Manitowoc Aluminum Novelty Company, founded in neighboring Manitowoc, Wisconsin, by Henry Vits in 1898; and the New Jersey Aluminum Company founded in 1890 in Newark, New Jersey. In 1909, the three companies merged, and the resulting company was renamed the Aluminum Goods Manufacturing Company. It was headquartered in Manitowoc and headed by Vits as president and Koenig as vice president. In 1910, in a $200,000 deal between George Vits and the eastern capitalists, all offices and manufacturing were moved to Manitowoc.

The company received its first government contract in 1911, winning an $80,000 contract to build aluminum canteens developed by Joseph Koenig for the army. Koening filed for a patent in April 1911 and was granted patent US1062716 in May 1913.

By 1914, the company reported that its employment was over 400 and building space had grown to almost 90,000 sq ft. In 1915 the company acquired the facilities of the Standard Aluminum Company, another manufacturer in Two Rivers. For the next two years the company concentrated on the production of cooking utensils. The Mirro brand was introduced in 1917.

The company continued to grow and by 1920 had increased its capital to $12,000,000.

=== 1941-1982 ===
During World War II Mirro retooled its factories to make aluminum products for the military. When the war ended in 1945, the company expanded into aluminum toys, making the popular Sno-Coaster saucer shaped sled. In 1957 shareholders approved a name change to the Mirro Aluminum Company.

In 1958, Mirro began manufacturing a line of 16 ft aluminum boats under the Mirro-Craft name. The boats, introduced at the Chicago National Boat Show in February of that year, were designed by naval architect David Beach. Shipment of production boats did not start until January 1959.

In late 1971, Mirro purchased Cruisers, Inc., of Oconto, Wisconsin, a manufacturer of Fiberglass boats ranging in length from 16 ft to 25 ft.

At its peak, Mirro was the world's largest manufacturer of aluminum cooking utensils, and over time it had as many as eight plants in three states, with products ranging from pots and pans to small boats and aluminum siding.

In 1982 the boat business was divested. It was purchased by employees and moved to Gillett, Wisconsin, to a plant formerly owned by Mirro. The new company was named Northport, Inc. The MirroCraft tradename was transferred to the new company. In 2003 Northport was purchased by Weeres pontoons of St. Cloud, Minnesota. The fiberglass boat portion was sold to Cruisers, Incorporated of Oconto, Wisconsin. This company is now known as Cruisers Yachts.

=== 1983-2003 ===
Former company logo.

Mirro was acquired by The Newell Companies in 1983. The following year, their new parent company also acquired Aluminum Specialty Company, Mirro's longtime neighbor in Manitowoc that was noted for manufacturing aluminum christmas trees in the 1960s. Facing competition from other manufacturers, Newell had moved most of its Manitowoc area operations out of the country by 2001, and shuttered the most modern of the area Mirro plants in 2003. Mirro also closed its administrative offices in Manitowoc at that time, ending the company's 118-year history in the area.

=== Post 2003 ===
The manufacturing facility in the industrial park on Mirro Drive on the northeast of Manitowoc, was purchased by Koenig & Vits, Inc., when it closed. They formed an alliance in 2005 with Tramontina, a Brazil-based cookware and cutlery manufacture to manufacture cookware in Manitowoc at the plant. July 8, 2019 the company announced it is closing the Manitowoc manufacturing plant, laying off 145 workers.

The current owner of the plant, Skana Aluminum, was incorporated in 2009. The plant is currently operated as a contract custom aluminum rolling mill.

As of July 2014, The trademark name Mirro (U.S. Trademark 86,014,641) was registered to Groupe SEB.

The trademark for MIRRO CRAFT (U.S. Trademark 72,057,085) was renewed in 2009 by Northport Marine LLC of Gillett, Wisconsin.

The part of the old plant in the downtown location, bounded by 15th, 16th, Franklin and Washington streets, has been demolished. The current owner of this parcel is EJ Spirtas Manitowoc LLC. Plans for redevelopment of the remaining portion of the building occupying the south third of the block into the Mirro Shops, are currently on hold.

The former 250,000 sq. ft. distribution center next to the plant on Mirro Drive was sold to Orion Energy Systems by Koenig & Vits in 2004.

The newer downtown building in the next block west bounded by 16th and 17th streets is owned by LVR Properties LLC

== Gallery ==
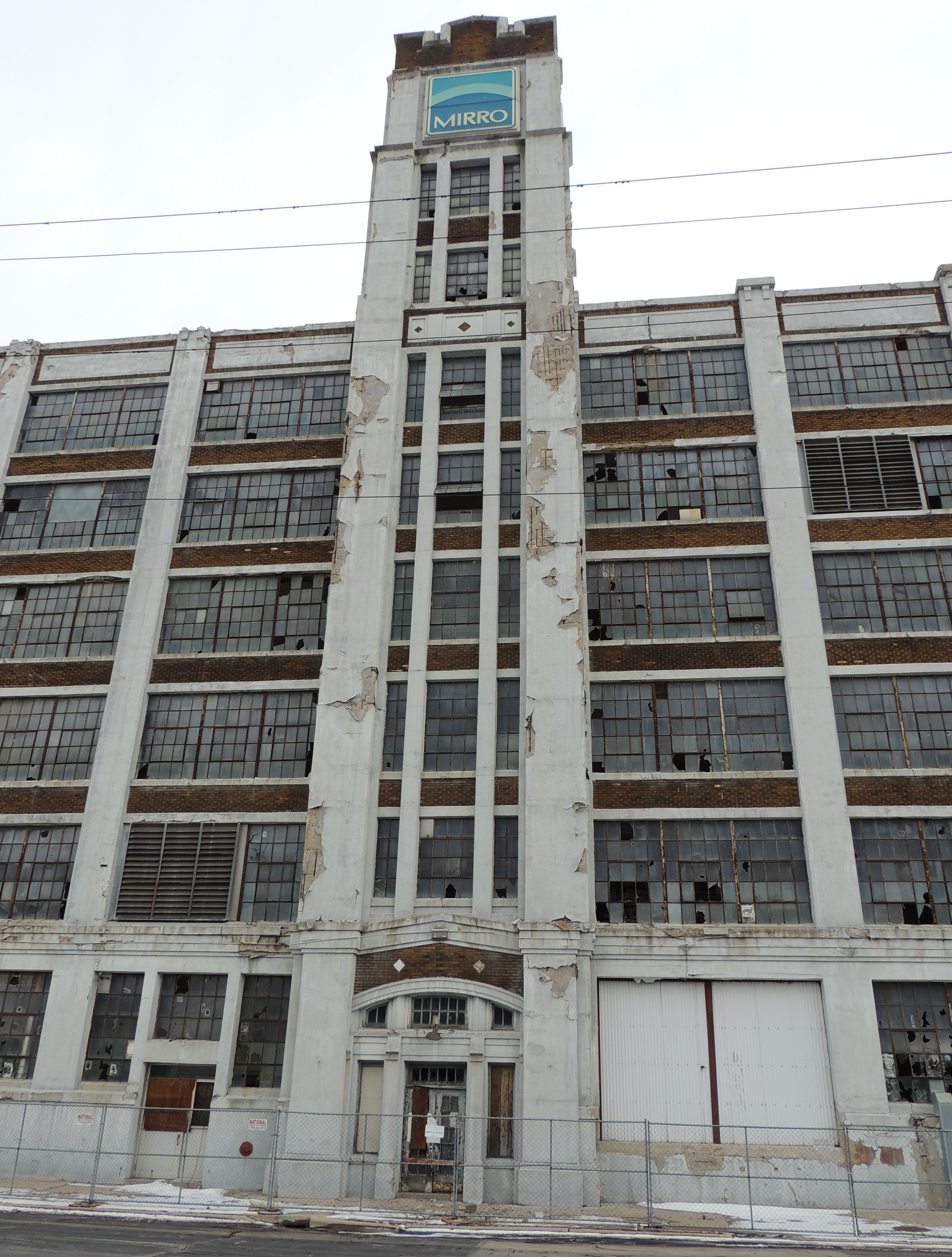
Winter - front (Jan 2015)

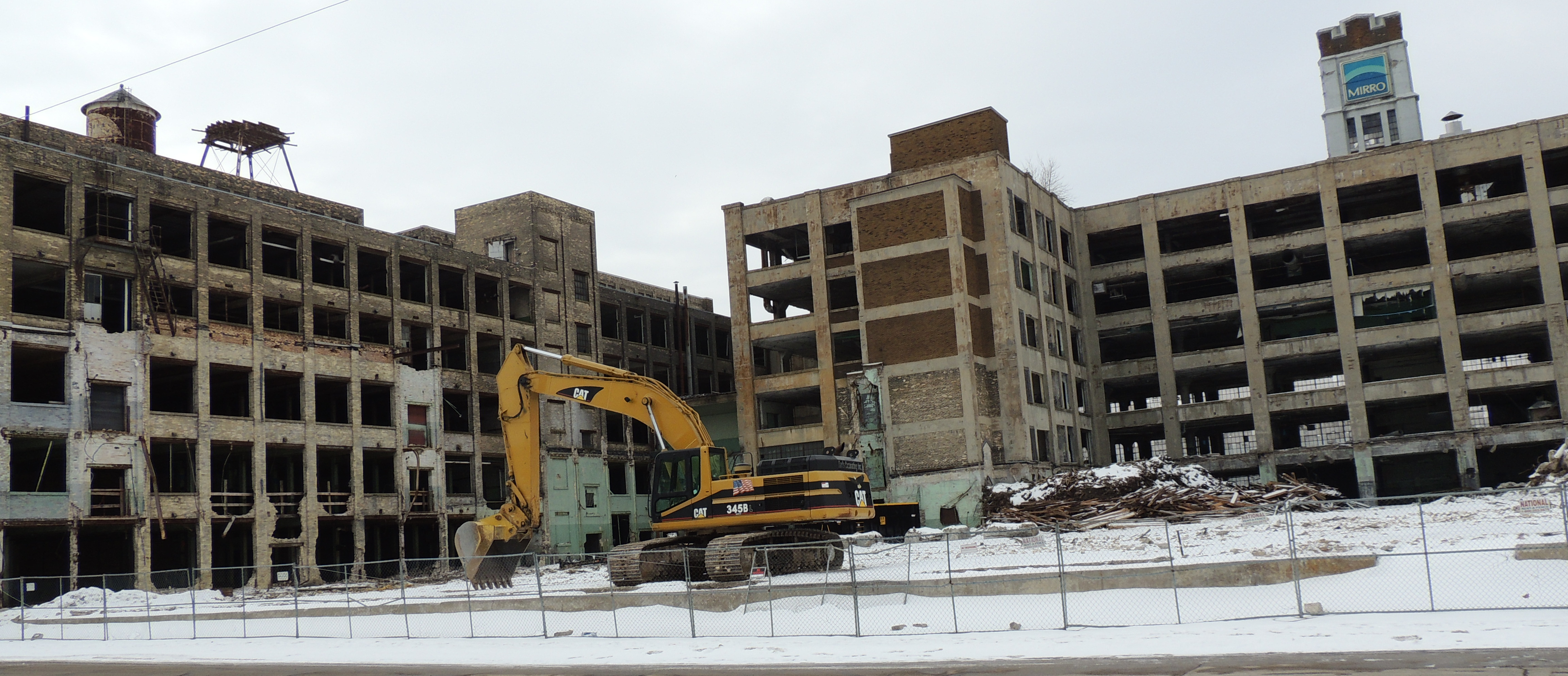
Winter - side (Jan 2015)

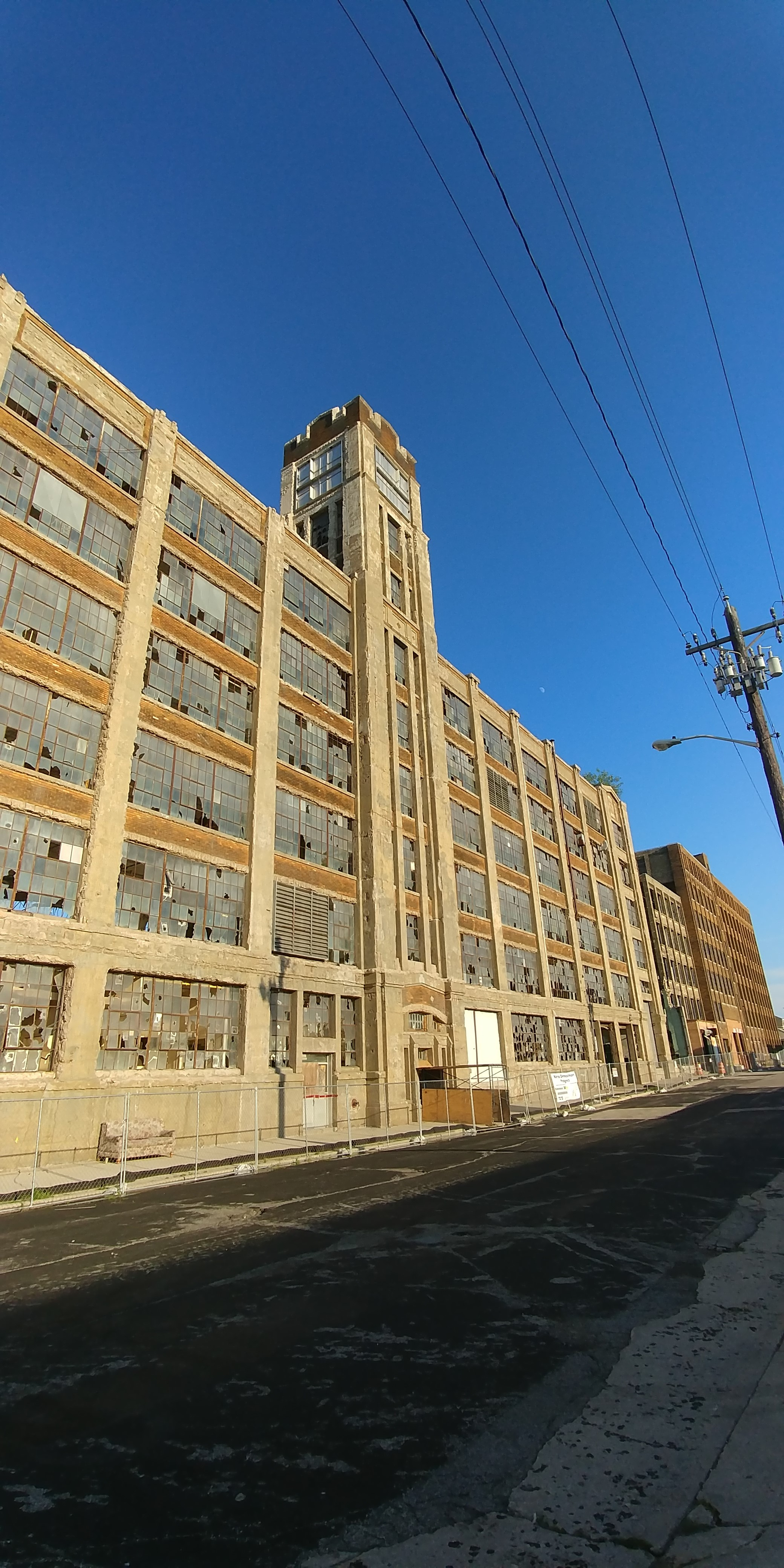
Mirro building during the demolition project in 2017

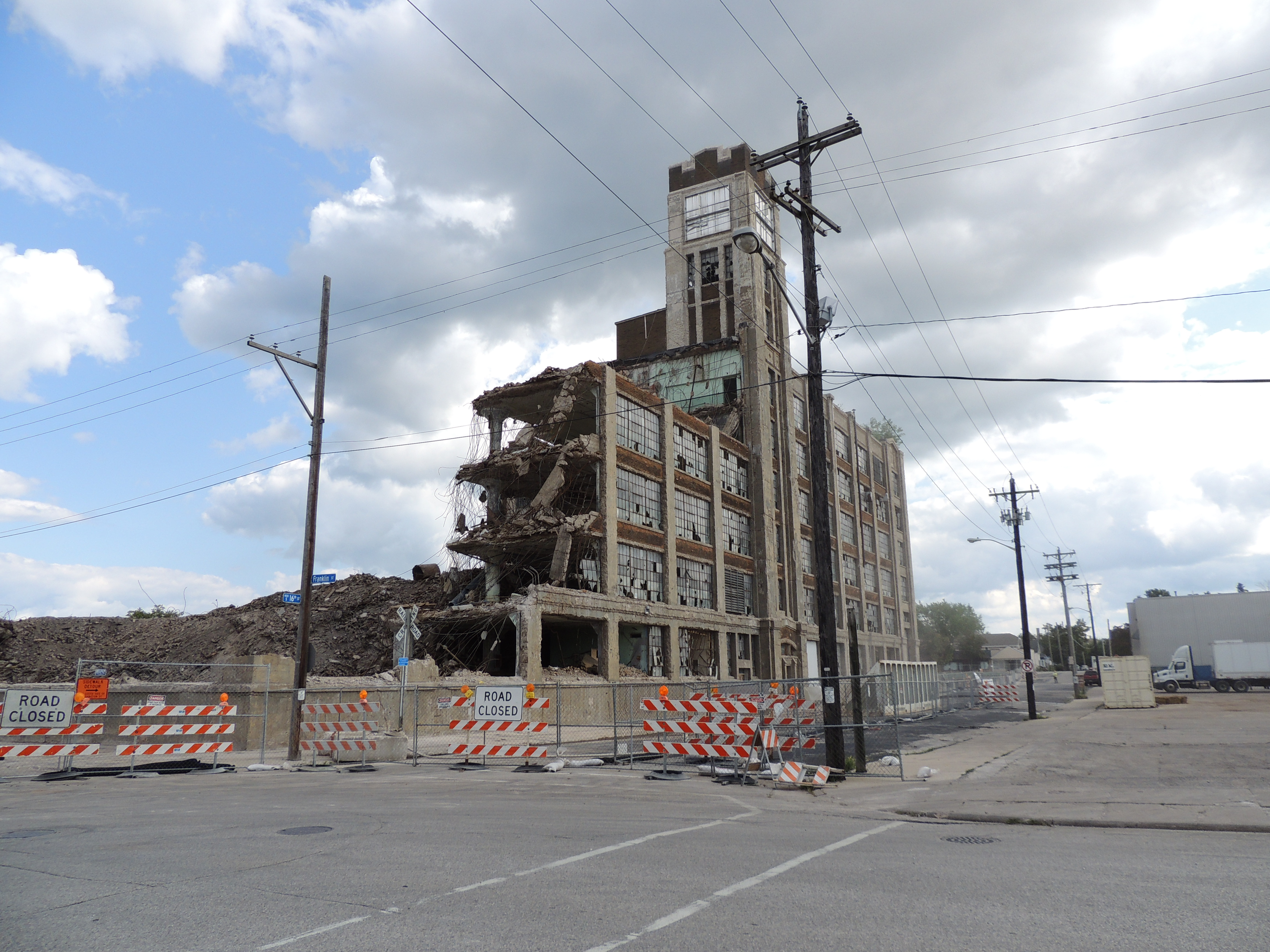
Demolition of the Mirro Aluminum Company building in August 2017

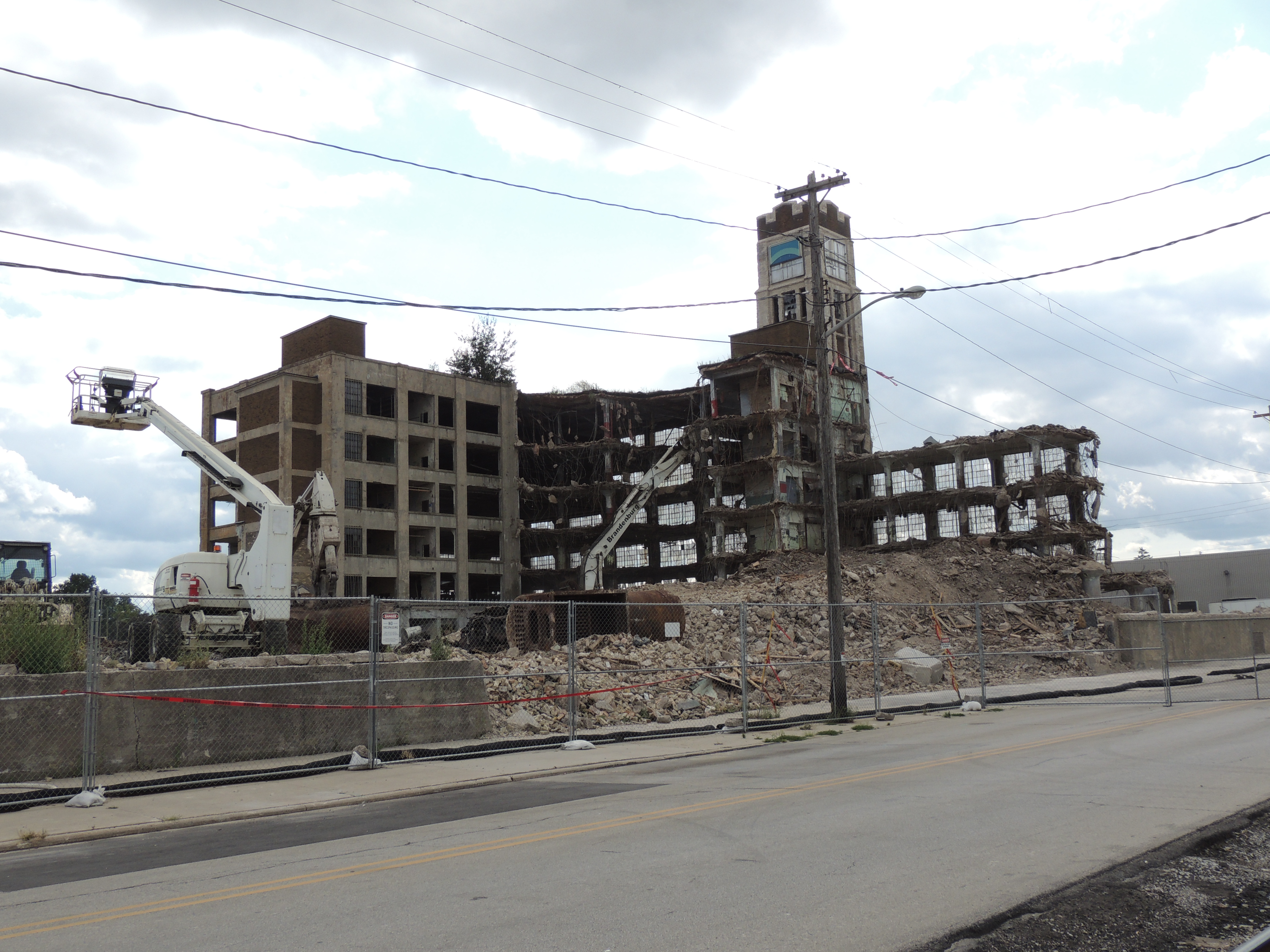
Demolition of the Mirro Aluminum Company building in August 2017

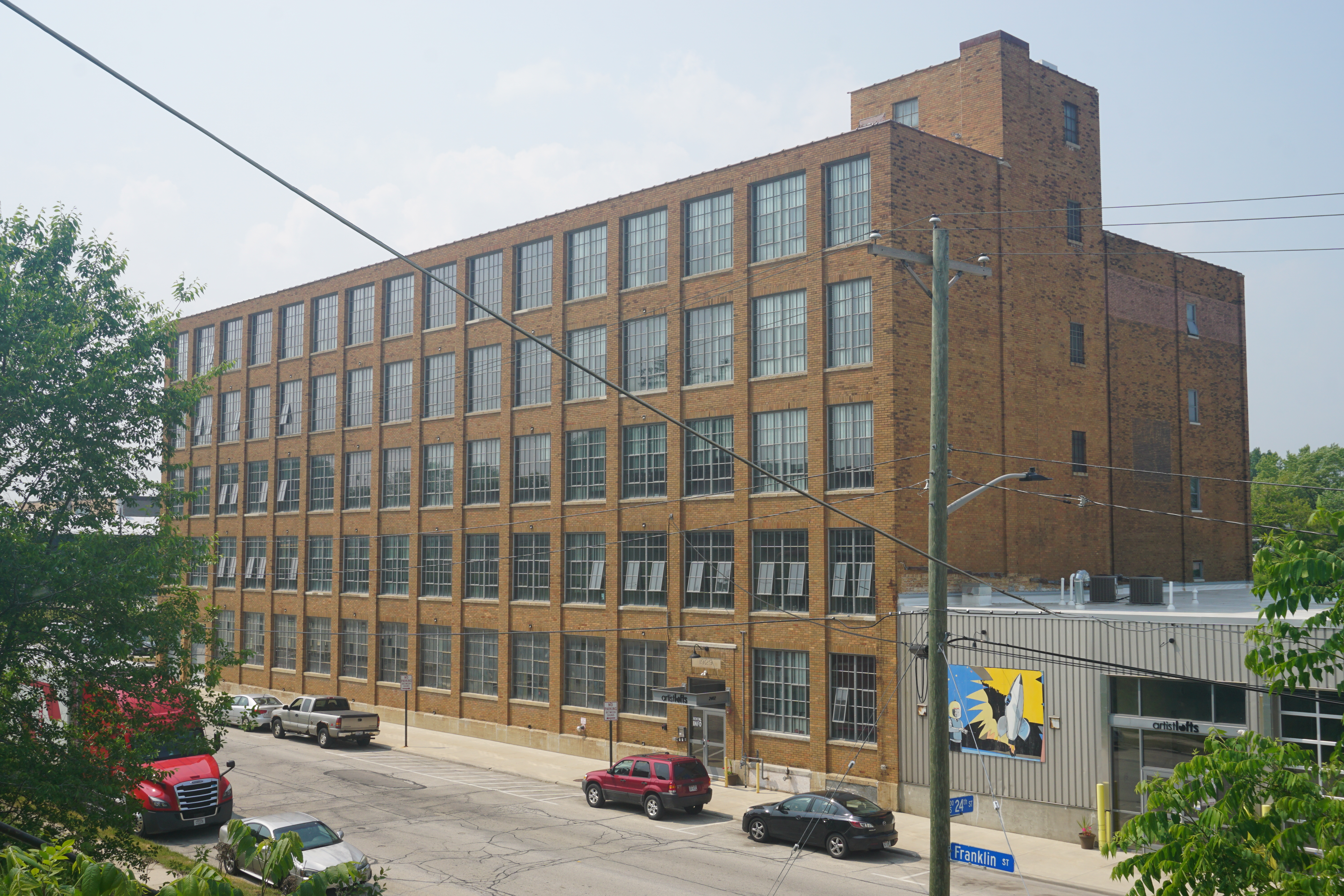
Mirro Aluminum Company Plant No. 1, currently Artist Lofts
