= G. Randy Kasten =

American attorney and author (born 1955)

Gregory Randolph Kasten is an American attorney and author. Born April 11, 1955 in Oakland, California, Kasten received a bachelor's degree in American Studies from Reed College in Portland, Oregon in 1978 and a J.D. from Golden Gate University School of Law in 1982. He was admitted to the California bar in 1984. Now working in San Francisco, California, Kasten's first book was Just Trust Me: Finding the Truth in a World of Spin (Quest Books, 2011) a nonfiction work on critical thinking.

The book presents methods for discovering truths behind advertising, politics, media, family and social relationships. Kasten has described the genesis of the book as his experiences in a rural community "It was 1970, and my family had recently moved from the San Francisco Bay Area to a town in the San Joaquin Valley…One evening I found myself sitting on a couch at my friend Earl's house…Walter Cronkite was finishing up a newscast with a bit of commentary. He spoke about the dangers of making up one's mind too quickly and labeling events before fully understanding them…His concluding phrase was something like, "Let's not be too quick to use the label-making device." Earl looked over at me. "Do you know what the crap he was talking about?" Kasten has said the book is an attempt to answer that question.

The trade publication Publishers Weekly observed "G. Randy Kasten explains how to discern fact from fiction in all your personal and professional dealings with others so as not to be taken for a ride." The Magical Buffet stated "your mind will probably be blown on more than one occasion as you realize, I do that, or I’ve experienced that. Humans are a strange animal indeed, and these are truly some of our strangest times."

Kasten's play, The Perfect Step, had a five-performance run at the Fringe of Marin in November 2011. The play featured songs by the musical group Random Love. In 2012, two of his songs were featured in Not Quite Opera, a production at the Alcove Theatre in San Francisco. His play Supplementing had a five-performance run at the Fringe of Marin festival in November 2012. Kasten is at work on The Selling of the Next War, a book setting forth logical arguments for optimism about world peace.
