= Fight OUT Loud =

Non-profit LGBT organization

- Founded: 2007
- Purpose: "Fight OUT Loud is a national non-profit organization dedicated to empowering GLBT individuals and their allies to fight discrimination and hate."
- Location: United States
- Region served: United States
- Method: Activism
- Website: fightoutloud.org

Fight OUT Loud is a non-profit organization in the United States aimed to empower LGBT individuals. Fight OUT Loud was established in 2007.

== Overview ==
Fight OUT Loud is a United States 501(c)(3) non-profit organization established in 2007 to empower lesbian, gay, bisexual, and transgender (LGBT) individuals, and their allies to fight discrimination and hate. The organization also works to raise awareness of hate crimes as in the cases of E.O. Green School shooting of Lawrence King. The group also advocates for the passage of the Employment Non-Discrimination Act (ENDA).

== History ==
Fight OUT Loud was founded by Waymon Hudson and Anthony Niedwiecki as a result of a 2007 incident where an employee at the Fort Lauderdale International Airport played an anti-gay death threat over the intercom quoting a Bible verse from Leviticus reading "men that lie with men as with women should be put to death." The couple complained but no action was taken until they alerted local and national media outlets. According to Hudson, the incident became an international news story. According to the group they had over 5,000 members in less than four months of doing their free online action alerts.

Their first cause after the airport incident was supporting two 14-year-old lesbians in Portland, Oregon who were verbally abused by the bus driver as he was kicking them off the bus for kissing. The group worked with the teens and their mothers, the Portland transit department issued an apology in response to the concerns.

=== National Recognition ===
In 2007 Fight OUT Loud became a leader in the effort to address Fort Lauderdale, Florida Mayor Jim Naugle's comments about the gay community. Comments Naugle made about alleged use of a planned $250,000 robotic toilet in Fort Lauderdale's beach to prevent sexual encounters between men caused protests from the local community. In a press release and in public rallies they tied his official public statements to violent anti-gay incidents. The protests and campaign led to Naugle's removal from Broward County's Tourism Board, and the proposed toilet was eliminated from the budget.

In 2008 the group announce the first four members of their newly formed national board of advisors including: Chip Arndt (activist and winner of The Amazing Race - season 4); Matt Foreman (Executive Director of the National Gay and Lesbian Task Force); David Mixner (political strategist, civil rights activist and public affairs advisor); and Pam Spaulding (Editor and publisher of Pam's House Blend).

In 2010 Hudson and Niedwiecki moved to Chicago and continue to coordinate the group's work from there online.

In 2011 the organization was the beneficiary of "Rock Out Loud", a music concert and anti hate crimes rally at Nova Southeastern University.

== Anthony Niedwiecki ==
A law professor and administrator at Broward County's Shepard Broad law school, Niedwiecki and his husband Waymon Hudson were co-founders of the lesbian, gay, bisexual and transgender lobby group Fight OUT Loud, and led an activist campaign against former Fort Lauderdale mayor Jim Naugle after Naugle made a number of anti-gay statements. The couple also lobbied the Florida State Senate to overturn the state's ban on gay adoption, after taking in a foster child who had been abandoned as "unadoptable" by the state because of the child's HIV status. The couple wed in California in before Proposition 8 passed in June 2008 and remain legally married as one of 18,000 couples still wed after the anti-gay marriage proposition passed.
