= 2025 Virginia Attorney General election =

- November 4, 2025
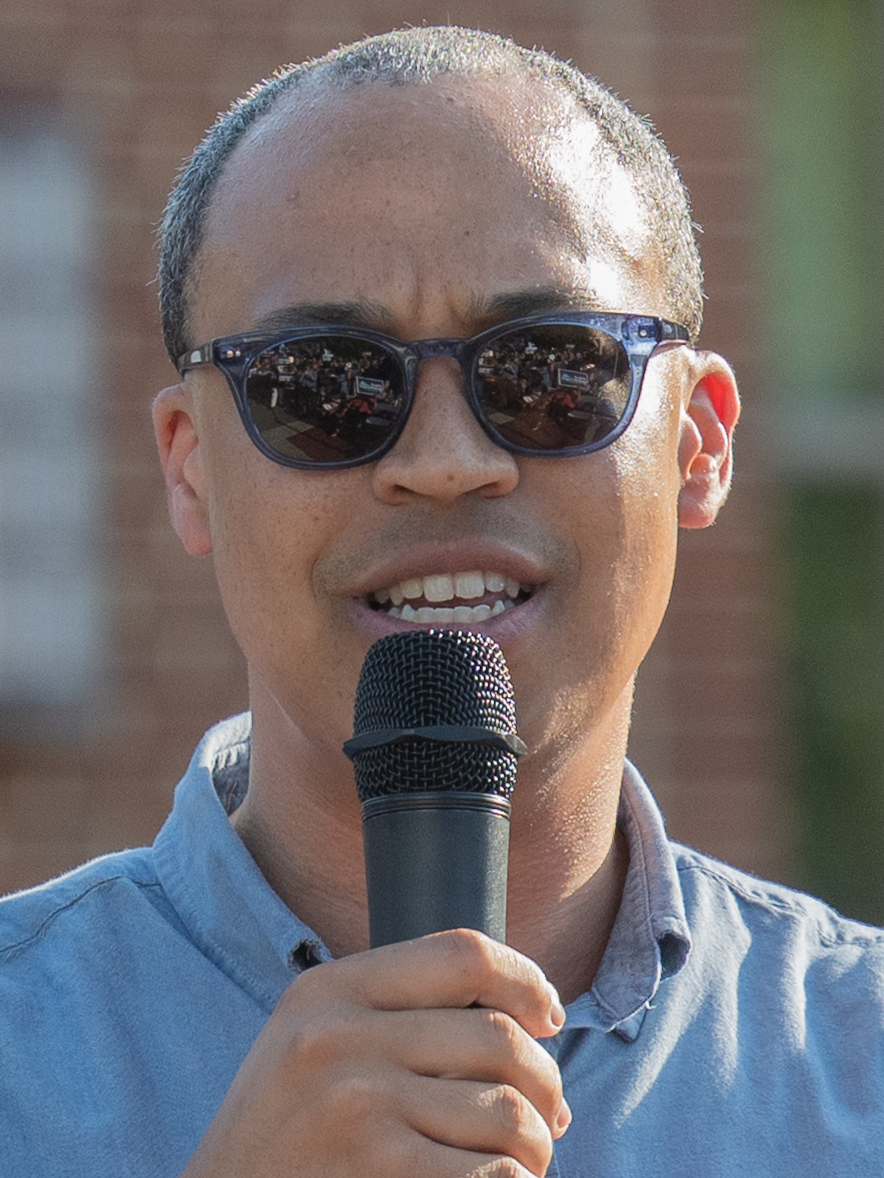

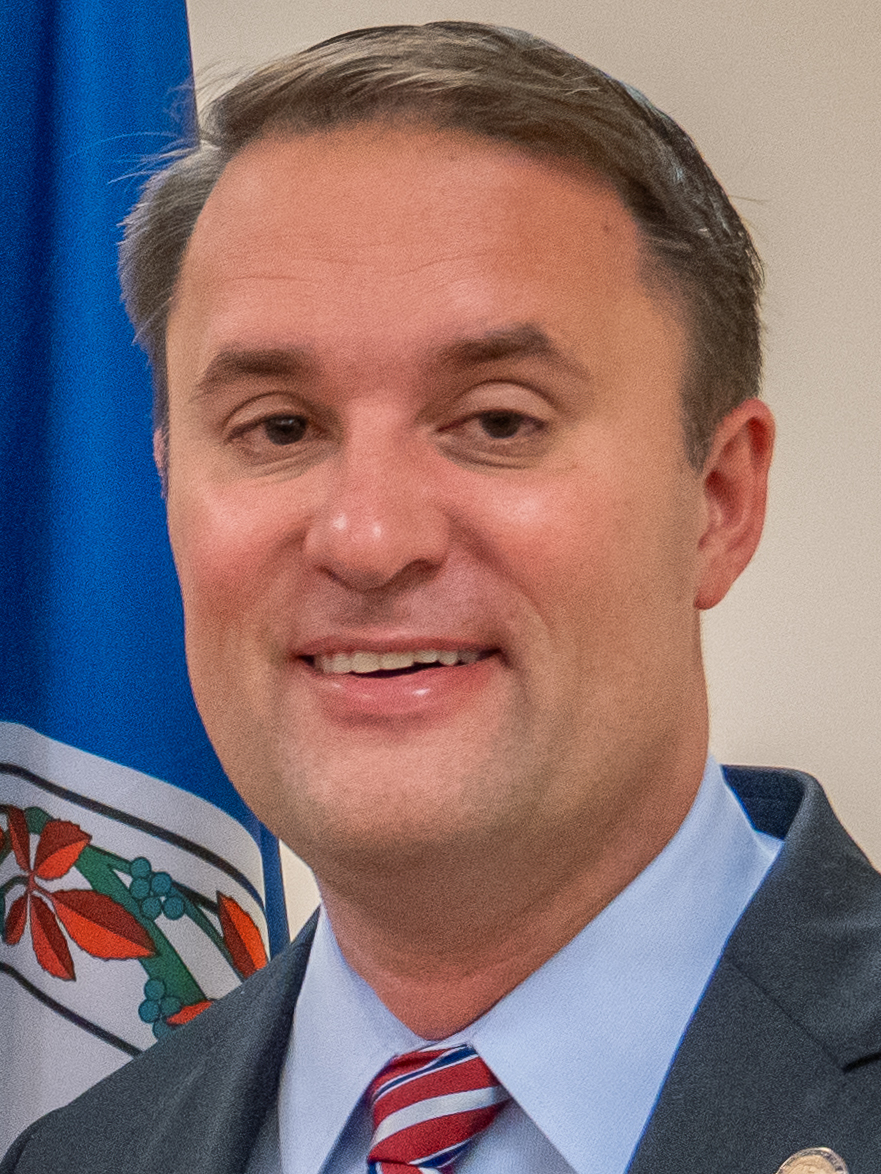
Nominee	Jay Jones	Jason Miyares
Party	Democratic	Republican
Popular vote	1,804,940	1,577,843
Percentage	53.14%	46.45%
- Jones: 40–50% 50–60% 60–70% 70–80% 80–90% >90% Miyares: 40–50% 50–60% 60–70% 70–80% 80–90% >90% Tie: 50% No votes
Attorney General before election
Jason Miyares
Republican
Elected Attorney General
Jay Jones
Democratic

The 2025 Virginia attorney general election was held in the US state on November 4, 2025, to elect the attorney general of Virginia. The election was held concurrently with elections for Virginia's statewide offices, the House of Delegates, and other local offices. Incumbent Republican Attorney General Jason Miyares lost his bid for a second term to a challenge by the Democratic nominee Jay Jones in the general election. The in-person early voting period ran from September 19 to November 1, 2025.

During his campaign, Jones received widespread condemnation after text messages from 2022 surfaced in which he joked about shooting the then-state house speaker Todd Gilbert and fantasized about the death of his children, while deriding a moderate Democrat who had received eulogies from Republicans. Despite the controversy and bipartisan condemnation, including from his running mates, Jones defied the polls that predicted the reelection of Miyares and won the election by 6.69%. Jones became the first African American to serve as Virginia attorney general. Jones outperformed Kamala Harris from 2024, but largely underperformed Abigail Spanberger and Ghazala Hashmi in the concurrent gubernatorial and lieutenant gubernatorial elections.

== Republican primary ==
=== Background ===
Incumbent Attorney General Jason Miyares announced his re-election bid on November 18, 2024, on X after declining a gubernatorial bid.

He received the party's nomination on April 3, after no other candidacies were filed.

=== Candidates ===
==== Nominee ====
- Jason Miyares, incumbent attorney general (2022–2026)

=== Endorsements ===
Jason Miyares

Statewide officials

- Glenn Youngkin, governor of Virginia (2022–2026)

== Democratic primary ==
=== Campaign ===
Teo Armus of The Washington Post described the primary as a proxy battle between Dominion Energy and Clean Virginia, an environmental group meant to counter Dominion's influence in Virginia elections. Shannon Taylor received over $800,000 from Dominion, its largest ever contribution in a single race. Jay Jones received $579,000 from Clean Virginia.

=== Candidates ===
==== Nominee ====
- Jay Jones, former Washington, D.C. assistant attorney general (2022–2023), former state delegate from the 89th district (2018–2021), and candidate for attorney general in 2021

==== Eliminated in primary ====
- Shannon Taylor, Henrico County commonwealth's attorney (2012–present)

==== Declined ====
- Steve Descano, Fairfax County commonwealth's attorney (2020–present) (endorsed Jones)

=== Endorsements ===
Jay Jones

U.S. senators

- Cory Booker, New Jersey (2013–present)

U.S. representatives

- Bobby Scott, VA-03 (1993–present)
- Suhas Subramanyam, VA-10 (2025–present)
- Eugene Vindman, VA-07 (2025–present)

Statewide officials

- Terry McAuliffe, former governor of Virginia (2014–2018)
- Ralph Northam, former governor of Virginia (2018–2022)

State legislators

- 4 state senators (Note: Lashrecse Aird, SD-13 (2024–present); Russet Perry, SD-31 (2024–present); Kannan Srinivasan, SD-32 (2025–present); Schuyler VanValkenburg, SD-16 (2024–present))
- 6 state delegates (Note: Alex Askew, HD-95 (2020–2022, 2024–present); Jeff Bourne, former HD-71 (2017–2024); Patrick Hope, HD-01 (2010–present); Adele McClure, HD-02 (2024–present); Atoosa Reaser, HD-27 (2024–present); Irene Shin, HD-08 (2022–present))

Local officials

- Andrea Bailey, Prince William County supervisor
- Parisa Dehghani-Tafti, commonwealth's attorney of Arlington and Falls Church
- Steve Descano, Fairfax County commonwealth's attorney
- Karl Frisch, Fairfax County School Board chair
- Koran Saines, Loudoun County supervisor

Organizations

- American Federation of Government Employees
- Clean Virginia
Shannon Taylor

Statewide officials

- Mark Herring, former attorney general of Virginia (2014–2022)
- Mary Sue Terry, former attorney general of Virginia (1986–1993)

State legislators

- Eileen Filler-Corn, former speaker of the House of Delegates (2020–2022) from HD-41 (2010–2024)
- Dick Saslaw, former majority leader of the Virginia Senate (2020–2024) from SD-35 (1980–2024)

Labor unions

- International Association of Sheet Metal, Air, Rail and Transportation Workers and SMART Local 100

Organizations

- EMILY's List

=== Polling ===
Poll source	Date(s) administered	Sample size (Note: Key: A – all adults RV – registered voters LV – likely voters V – unclear)	Margin of error	Jay Jones	Shannon Taylor	Undecided
Global Strategy Group (D) (Note: Poll sponsored by Taylor's campaign)	March 11–13, 2025	600 (LV)	± 4.0%	15%	25%	60%

=== Results ===
Results by county and independent city: Jones: 50–60%; 60–70%; 70–80%; Taylor: 50–60%; 60–70%; Tie: 50%

2025 Virginia attorney general Democratic primary
Party	Candidate	Votes	%
Democratic	Jay Jones	252,976	51.11%
Democratic	Shannon Taylor	241,969	48.89%
Total votes		494,945	100.00%

== General election ==
=== Campaign ===
In October, a month before the election, a 2022 text conversation between Jay Jones and Republican delegate Carrie Coyner following the death of former delegate Democrat Joe Johnson Jr. was made public by National Review. In the texts, Jones made disparaging remarks toward Republican members of the House, stating, "If those guys die before me I will go to their funerals to piss on their graves." Jones targeted then-Speaker of the House of Delegates Republican Todd Gilbert, giving a scenario in which Gilbert would be shot twice in the head. Jones said, "Three people, two bullets, Gilbert, Hitler, and Pol Pot. Gilbert gets two bullets to the head. Spoiler: put Gilbert in the crew with the two worst people you know, and he receives both bullets every time." Jones also wished death upon Gilbert's children, and said that Gilbert and his wife were "evil" and "breeding little fascists."

Jones received bipartisan condemnation for his texts. His running mates Abigail Spanberger, the Democratic nominee in the 2025 Virginia gubernatorial election, and Ghazala Hashmi, the Democratic nominee in the 2025 Virginia lieutenant gubernatorial election, issued statements condemning Jones's comments. Spanberger said that she had spoken with Jones regarding her "disgust". Meanwhile, Hashmi stated, "I condemn it at every turn, Jay must take accountability for the pain that his words have caused", along with U.S. Senator Mark Warner writing that Jones's comments are "appalling, unacceptable, and inconsistent with the person [he's] known." Virginia Senate Majority Leader Scott Surovell called the texts "a serious lapse in judgment that cannot be defended," while current Virginia House Speaker Don Scott condemned the remarks but stated that "we can't get distracted, because they want us to get distracted by the text message here or something else. Stay focused." Republicans, including Governor Glenn Youngkin, U.S. House Speaker Mike Johnson, and Vice President JD Vance, called for Jones to withdraw from the race.

In Jones's initial statement following the publication, he accused his opponent of "dropping smears through Trump-controlled media organizations to assault my character and rescue his desperate campaign" and stated that his opponent "will continue to be accountable to Donald Trump, not the people of Virginia." Prior to the article, it had come out that in the same year, Jones was charged with reckless driving after driving 116 miles per hour on Interstate 64 in New Kent County. Despite Virginia's mandatory one-year jail sentence for reckless driving, Jones was sentenced to 1,000 hours of community service, half of which he served working for his own PAC, Meet Our Moment, along with a $1,500 fine. Jones later issued a statement taking responsibility for the text messages, and apologized to Gilbert and his family.

A criminal investigation was opened against Jones by the New Kent County commonwealth's attorney on October 9, stating that the documentation did not clearly indicate that Meet Our Moment was a political action committee and that community service must be performed at nonpolitical nonprofit organizations. On October 21, a judge signed an order recusing the New Kent County commonwealth's attorney and appointing the Williamsburg-James City County commonwealth's attorney as a special prosecutor to oversee the investigation.

=== Debates ===
There was one streamed debate, on October 16, hosted by the University of Richmond.

2025 Virginia attorney general debate
No.	Date	Host	Moderator	Link	Republican	Democratic
Key: P Participant A Absent N Not invited I Invited W Withdrawn						
Key: P Participant A Absent N Not invited I Invited W Withdrawn					Miyares	Jones
1	October 16, 2025	Virginia Bar Association; University of Richmond	Brett Marston		P	P

=== Predictions ===
Source	Ranking	As of
State Navigate	Lean D (flip)	October 22, 2025
Sabato's Crystal Ball	Lean D (flip)	August 21, 2025

=== Post-primary endorsements ===
Jason Miyares (R)

Executive branch officials

- Donald Trump, president of the United States (2017–2021, 2025–present)

U.S. representatives

- Denver Riggleman, former VA-05 (2019–2021) (Independent)

Statewide officials

- Bob McDonnell, former governor of Virginia (2010–2014)
- James Uthmeier, attorney general of Florida (2025–present)

State legislators

- Mark Earley Jr., HD-73 (2024–present)

Local officials

- Pat Herrity, Fairfax County supervisor from the Springfield district (2008–present)

Organizations

- National Right to Life Committee
- NRA Political Victory Fund
- Virginia Police Benevolent Association
Jay Jones (D)

U.S. senators

- Tim Kaine, Virginia (2013–present)

State legislators

- Lamont Bagby, SD-14 (2024–present)
- Joe Morrissey, former SD-16 (2020–2024)

Local officials

- Shannon Taylor, Henrico County commonwealth's attorney (2012–present) (eliminated in primary)

Organizations

- End Citizens United
- Giffords
- Jewish Democratic Council of America
- National Organization for Women Virginia Chapter
- People for the American Way
- Reproductive Freedom for All

=== Polling ===
Aggregate polls

Source of poll aggregation	Dates administered	Dates updated	Jason Miyares (R)	Jay Jones (D)	Other/Undecided (Note: Calculated by taking the difference of 100% and all other candidates combined.)	Margin
Decision Desk HQ	through November 3, 2025	November 3, 2025	47.3%	45.5%	7.1%	Miyares +1.8%
RealClearPolitics	October 16–31, 2025	November 2, 2025	47.0%	45.4%	7.6%	Miyares +1.6%
VoteHub	through November 3, 2025	November 4, 2025	46.9%	45.8%	7.3%	Miyares +1.1%
Average			47.1%	45.6%	7.3%	Miyares +1.5%

Poll source	Date(s) administered	Sample size	Margin of error	Jason Miyares (R)	Jay Jones (D)	Other	Undecided
Quantus Insights (R)	November 3, 2025	1,039 (LV)	± 2.7%	47%	47%	1%	5%
InsiderAdvantage (R)	November 2–3, 2025	800 (LV)	± 3.5%	47%	49%	–	4%
The Trafalgar Group (R)	November 1–2, 2025	1,057 (LV)	± 2.9%	46%	46%	–	8%
Emerson College	October 30–31, 2025	880 (LV)	± 3.2%	47%	49%	–	4%
Echelon Insights	October 28–31, 2025	606 (LV)	± 4.7%	49%	46%	1% (Note: "I did not vote for this office" with 1%)	4%
AtlasIntel	October 25–30, 2025	1,325 (LV)	± 3.0%	48%	47%	3% (Note: "Would not vote" with 3%)	2%
SoCal Strategies (R) (Note: Poll sponsored by Red Eagle Politics, a conservative content creator)	October 28–29, 2025	800 (LV)	–	48%	46%	–	6%
State Navigate	October 26–28, 2025	614 (LV)	± 4.0%	46%	49%	–	5%
Roanoke College	October 22–27, 2025	1,041 (LV)	± 4.1%	46%	38%	4% (Note: "Refused" with 3%; "Some other candidate" with 1%)	12%
A2 Insights	October 24–26, 2025	776 (LV)	–	49%	48%	–	3%
Christopher Newport University	October 21–23, 2025	803 (LV)	± 4.1%	46%	45%	1%	8%
Suffolk University	October 19–21, 2025	500 (LV)	± 4.4%	46%	42%	2% (Note: "Refused" with 2%)	9%
Quantus Insights (R)	October 19–20, 2025	1,302 (RV)	± 2.8%	49%	42%	2%	7%
State Navigate	October 17–20, 2025	694 (LV)	± 4.0%	45%	50%	–	5%
The Washington Post/Schar School	October 16–20, 2025	927 (LV)	± 3.5%	46%	46%	5% (Note: "Neither" with 4%; "Would not vote" with 1%)	3%
The Washington Post/Schar School	October 16–20, 2025	927 (RV)	± 3.5%	44%	44%	9% (Note: "Neither" with 6%; "Would not vote" with 3%)	3%
Kaplan Strategies (R)	October 16–18, 2025	556 (LV)	± 4.2%	45%	44%	–	10%
co/efficient (R)	October 15–17, 2025	937 (LV)	± 3.2%	46%	42%	–	11%
Clarity Campaign Labs (D) (Note: Poll commissioned by the Democratic Attorneys General Association, which supports Jones)	October 14–17, 2025	958 (RV)	± 3.2%	47%	47%	–	6%
The Trafalgar Group/InsiderAdvantage (R)	October 13–15, 2025	1,039 (LV)	± 2.9%	50%	45%	–	6%
Virginia Commonwealth University	October 6–14, 2025	842 (A)	± 4.0%	45%	42%	–	12%
The Trafalgar Group (R)	October 8–10, 2025	1,034 (LV)	± 2.9%	49%	43%	–	8%
Cygnal (R) (Note: Poll commissioned by the Republican Attorneys General Association, which supports Miyares)	October 6–7, 2025	600 (LV)	± 4.0%	46%	44%	–	10%
Hart Research (D) (Note: Poll sponsored by Jones's campaign)	October 4–6, 2025	600 (LV)	–	45%	46%	–	9%
	October 3, 2025	Jay Jones text messages leak					
Christopher Newport University	September 29 – October 1, 2025	805 (RV)	± 3.9%	43%	49%	–	8%
The Trafalgar Group (R)	September 29 – October 1, 2025	1,034 (LV)	± 2.9%	45%	49%	–	6%
The Washington Post/Schar School	September 25–29, 2025	1,002 (LV)	± 3.4%	45%	51%	1% (Note: "None of these" with 1%)	3%
The Washington Post/Schar School	September 25–29, 2025	1,002 (RV)	± 3.4%	42%	48%	6% (Note: "Neither" with 4%; "Would not vote" with 2%)	3%
A2 Insights	September 16–28, 2025	771 (LV)	–	46%	49%	1% (Note: "Other" with 1%)	5%
OnMessage Inc. (R)	September 15–18, 2025	800 (V)	± 3.5%	46%	46%	–	8%
Christopher Newport University	September 8–14, 2025	808 (RV)	± 3.9%	41%	48%	–	12%
Cygnal (R)	September 7, 2025	–	–	43%	46%	–	11%
Virginia Commonwealth University	August 18–28, 2025	804 (A)	± 4.1%	41%	47%	–	12%
SoCal Strategies (R) (Note: Poll sponsored by the Virginia Project)	August 31 – September 1, 2025	700 (LV)	–	41%	46%	–	12%
co/efficient (R)	August 23–26, 2025	1,025 (LV)	± 3.06%	44%	45%	–	11%
Roanoke College	August 11–15, 2025	702 (LV)	± 4.3%	38%	41%	–	21%
Wick Insights	July 9–11, 2025	1,000 (LV)	± 3.0%	41%	48%	–	11%
American Directions Research Group/AARP	June 25 – July 8, 2025	1,001 (LV)	± 3.1%	36%	53%	–	11%
Virginia Commonwealth University	June 19 – July 3, 2025	764 (RV)	± 4.2%	37%	46%	3% (Note: "Wouldn't vote" with 2%, "Refused" with 1%, and "Someone else" with 0%)	13%

Hypothetical polling

Jason Miyares vs. Generic Democrat

Poll source	Date(s) administered	Sample size	Margin of error	Jason Miyares (R)	Generic Democrat	Undecided
co/efficient (R) (Note: Poll sponsored by Founders Insight)	June 8–10, 2025	1,127 (LV)	± 3.1%	44%	44%	12%

== Results ==
2025 Virginia attorney general election
Party	Candidate	Votes	%	±%
Democratic	Jay Jones	1,804,940	53.14%	+3.59%
Republican	Jason Miyares (incumbent)	1,577,843	46.45%	−3.91%
Write-in		13,716	0.40%	+0.31%
Total votes		3,396,499	100.00%	N/A
Democratic gain from Republican				

=== By county and independent city ===
The counties and cities of Caroline, Nelson, Prince Edward, Spotsylvania, Waynesboro, and York voted for Miyares and Democrat Abigail Spanberger for governor.

Locality	Jason Miyares Republican		Jay Jones Democratic		Write-in Various		Margin		Totals
Locality	#	%	#	%	#	%	#	%	Totals
Accomack	7,462	57.57%	5,479	42.27%	21	0.16%	−1,983	−15.30%	12,962
Albemarle	18,727	34.16%	35,798	65.30%	296	0.54%	17,071	31.14%	54,821
Alexandria	13,412	21.86%	47,317	77.12%	630	1.03%	33,905	55.26%	61,359
Alleghany	4,179	72.64%	1,559	27.10%	15	0.26%	−2,620	−45.54%	5,753
Amelia	4,686	74.03%	1,637	25.86%	7	0.11%	−3,049	−48.17%	6,330
Amherst	9,121	69.70%	3,941	30.12%	24	0.18%	−5,180	−39.58%	13,086
Appomattox	5,751	78.17%	1,594	21.67%	12	0.16%	−4,157	−56.50%	7,357
Arlington	21,021	21.59%	75,633	77.67%	719	0.74%	54,612	56.09%	97,373
Augusta	25,478	75.09%	8,352	24.62%	99	0.29%	−17,126	−50.48%	33,929
Bath	1,461	77.02%	431	22.72%	5	0.26%	−1,030	−54.30%	1,897
Bedford	30,203	77.36%	8,761	22.44%	80	0.20%	−21,442	−54.92%	39,044
Bland	2,024	84.44%	370	15.44%	3	0.13%	−1,654	−69.00%	2,397
Botetourt	12,400	74.34%	4,254	25.50%	27	0.16%	−8,146	−48.83%	16,681
Bristol	3,242	68.79%	1,460	30.98%	11	0.23%	−1,782	−37.81%	4,713
Brunswick	2,720	45.96%	3,186	53.84%	12	0.20%	466	7.87%	5,918
Buchanan	4,519	83.98%	851	15.81%	11	0.20%	−3,668	−68.17%	5,381
Buckingham	3,730	61.84%	2,289	37.95%	13	0.22%	−1,441	−23.89%	6,032
Buena Vista	1,491	71.41%	590	28.26%	7	0.34%	−901	−43.15%	2,088
Campbell	17,470	76.18%	5,410	23.59%	52	0.23%	−12,060	−52.59%	22,932
Caroline	7,057	52.87%	6,255	46.86%	35	0.26%	−802	−6.01%	13,347
Carroll	9,112	80.75%	2,157	19.12%	15	0.13%	−6,955	−61.64%	11,284
Charles City	1,587	45.76%	1,867	53.84%	14	0.40%	280	8.07%	3,468
Charlotte	3,262	69.54%	1,422	30.31%	7	0.15%	−1,840	−39.22%	4,691
Charlottesville	2,667	14.50%	15,625	84.95%	102	0.55%	12,958	70.45%	18,394
Chesapeake	45,173	47.21%	50,267	52.53%	253	0.26%	5,094	5.32%	95,693
Chesterfield	77,198	45.62%	91,374	54.00%	644	0.38%	14,176	8.38%	169,216
Clarke	4,461	58.93%	3,081	40.70%	28	0.37%	−1,380	−18.23%	7,570
Colonial Heights	4,318	66.12%	2,198	33.65%	15	0.23%	−2,120	−32.46%	6,531
Covington	1,062	63.94%	596	35.88%	3	0.18%	−466	−28.06%	1,661
Craig	1,863	82.65%	387	17.17%	4	0.18%	−1,476	−65.48%	2,254
Culpeper	13,444	62.18%	8,111	37.52%	65	0.30%	−5,333	−24.67%	21,620
Cumberland	2,724	61.91%	1,660	37.73%	16	0.36%	−1,064	−24.18%	4,400
Danville	4,861	39.94%	7,276	59.78%	34	0.28%	2,415	19.84%	12,171
Dickenson	3,513	79.21%	912	20.56%	10	0.23%	−2,601	−58.65%	4,435
Dinwiddie	7,305	60.65%	4,715	39.14%	25	0.21%	−2,590	−21.50%	12,045
Emporia	593	35.64%	1,069	64.24%	2	0.12%	476	28.61%	1,664
Essex	2,691	55.66%	2,130	44.05%	14	0.29%	−561	−11.60%	4,835
Fairfax City	3,331	32.54%	6,832	66.74%	74	0.72%	3,501	34.20%	10,237
Fairfax County	136,325	30.94%	301,294	68.38%	3,003	0.68%	164,969	37.44%	440,622
Falls Church	1,591	21.65%	5,696	77.50%	63	0.86%	4,105	55.85%	7,350
Fauquier	21,127	61.68%	13,012	37.99%	113	0.33%	−8,115	−23.69%	34,252
Floyd	4,949	67.11%	2,406	32.62%	20	0.27%	−2,543	−34.48%	7,375
Fluvanna	7,151	53.79%	6,096	45.86%	47	0.35%	−1,055	−7.94%	13,294
Franklin City	1,153	39.47%	1,766	60.46%	2	0.07%	613	20.99%	2,921
Franklin County	17,062	74.00%	5,936	25.74%	59	0.26%	−11,126	−48.25%	23,057
Frederick	24,411	63.15%	14,177	36.67%	68	0.18%	−10,234	−26.47%	38,656
Fredericksburg	3,408	32.89%	6,906	66.64%	49	0.47%	3,498	33.75%	10,363
Galax	1,334	71.15%	539	28.75%	2	0.11%	−795	−42.40%	1,875
Giles	5,186	76.89%	1,543	22.88%	16	0.24%	−3,643	−54.01%	6,745
Gloucester	11,982	69.52%	5,221	30.29%	32	0.19%	−6,761	−39.23%	17,235
Goochland	10,604	62.84%	6,216	36.84%	55	0.33%	−4,388	−26.00%	16,875
Grayson	4,752	81.15%	1,098	18.75%	6	0.10%	−3,654	−62.40%	5,856
Greene	5,762	61.25%	3,615	38.43%	30	0.32%	−2,147	−22.82%	9,407
Greensville	1,503	45.09%	1,828	54.85%	2	0.06%	325	9.75%	3,333
Halifax	8,237	62.04%	5,024	37.84%	15	0.11%	−3,213	−24.20%	13,276
Hampton	13,063	27.81%	33,819	71.99%	96	0.20%	20,756	44.18%	46,978
Hanover	39,076	65.29%	20,535	34.31%	241	0.40%	−18,541	−30.98%	59,852
Harrisonburg	4,122	31.94%	8,722	67.59%	60	0.46%	4,600	35.65%	12,904
Henrico	53,005	35.89%	94,039	63.67%	653	0.44%	41,034	27.78%	147,697
Henry	11,604	66.54%	5,796	33.23%	40	0.23%	−5,808	−33.30%	17,440
Highland	859	73.23%	308	26.26%	6	0.51%	−551	−46.97%	1,173
Hopewell	2,827	42.65%	3,794	57.24%	7	0.11%	967	14.59%	6,628
Isle of Wight	11,495	60.22%	7,556	39.59%	37	0.19%	−3,939	−20.64%	19,088
James City	20,848	49.36%	21,230	50.27%	156	0.37%	382	0.90%	42,234
King and Queen	2,073	63.57%	1,180	36.19%	8	0.25%	−893	−27.38%	3,261
King George	7,279	62.87%	4,266	36.85%	33	0.29%	−3,013	−26.02%	11,578
King William	6,325	70.28%	2,657	29.52%	18	0.20%	−3,668	−40.76%	9,000
Lancaster	3,477	58.26%	2,469	41.37%	22	0.37%	−1,008	−16.89%	5,968
Lee	5,568	86.45%	867	13.46%	6	0.09%	−4,701	−72.99%	6,441
Lexington	787	37.02%	1,329	62.51%	10	0.47%	542	25.49%	2,126
Loudoun	66,849	40.18%	98,696	59.32%	841	0.51%	31,847	19.14%	166,386
Louisa	11,938	63.52%	6,804	36.20%	51	0.27%	−5,134	−27.32%	18,793
Lunenburg	2,789	62.32%	1,676	37.45%	10	0.22%	−1,113	−24.87%	4,475
Lynchburg	14,340	54.08%	12,082	45.56%	95	0.36%	−2,258	−8.52%	26,517
Madison	4,483	68.24%	2,063	31.41%	23	0.35%	−2,420	−36.84%	6,569
Manassas	4,446	38.28%	7,120	61.31%	48	0.41%	2,674	23.02%	11,614
Manassas Park	1,282	32.27%	2,674	67.30%	17	0.43%	1,392	35.04%	3,973
Martinsville	1,556	39.42%	2,386	60.45%	5	0.13%	830	21.03%	3,947
Mathews	3,427	71.86%	1,335	27.99%	7	0.15%	−2,092	−43.87%	4,769
Mecklenburg	7,334	62.35%	4,409	37.48%	20	0.17%	−2,925	−24.87%	11,763
Middlesex	3,657	65.37%	1,926	34.43%	11	0.20%	−1,731	−30.94%	5,594
Montgomery	16,712	46.14%	19,335	53.38%	173	0.48%	2,623	7.24%	36,220
Nelson	4,043	53.13%	3,543	46.56%	23	0.30%	−500	−6.57%	7,609
New Kent	9,299	67.30%	4,478	32.41%	41	0.30%	−4,821	−34.89%	13,818
Newport News	19,061	33.99%	36,885	65.77%	139	0.25%	17,824	31.78%	56,085
Norfolk	17,459	27.38%	46,057	72.22%	260	0.41%	28,598	44.84%	63,776
Northampton	2,648	48.44%	2,798	51.18%	21	0.38%	150	2.74%	5,467
Northumberland	4,354	64.16%	2,413	35.56%	19	0.28%	−1,941	−28.60%	6,786
Norton	750	72.12%	289	27.79%	1	0.10%	−461	−44.33%	1,040
Nottoway	3,299	61.42%	2,060	38.35%	12	0.22%	−1,239	−23.07%	5,371
Orange	10,559	61.54%	6,526	38.03%	74	0.43%	−4,033	−23.50%	17,159
Page	7,196	77.84%	2,032	21.98%	17	0.18%	−5,164	−55.86%	9,245
Patrick	5,238	79.60%	1,332	20.24%	10	0.15%	−3,906	−59.36%	6,580
Petersburg	1,281	12.97%	8,575	86.81%	22	0.22%	7,294	73.84%	9,878
Pittsylvania	17,897	72.60%	6,712	27.23%	44	0.18%	−11,185	−45.37%	24,653
Poquoson	4,624	74.16%	1,598	25.63%	13	0.21%	−3,026	−48.53%	6,235
Portsmouth	9,147	29.32%	21,988	70.48%	62	0.20%	12,841	41.16%	31,197
Powhatan	12,507	73.86%	4,376	25.84%	51	0.30%	−8,131	−48.02%	16,934
Prince Edward	3,853	52.05%	3,520	47.55%	29	0.39%	−333	−4.50%	7,402
Prince George	8,327	61.06%	5,294	38.82%	16	0.12%	−3,033	−22.24%	13,637
Prince William	60,386	36.71%	103,553	62.95%	572	0.35%	43,167	26.24%	164,511
Pulaski	9,004	72.15%	3,440	27.56%	36	0.29%	−5,564	−44.58%	12,480
Radford	2,197	47.28%	2,426	52.21%	24	0.52%	229	4.93%	4,647
Rappahannock	2,368	59.20%	1,606	40.15%	26	0.65%	−762	−19.05%	4,000
Richmond City	15,390	17.17%	73,702	82.21%	560	0.62%	58,312	65.04%	89,652
Richmond County	2,098	67.46%	1,012	32.54%	0	0.00%	−1,086	−34.92%	3,110
Roanoke City	11,204	36.75%	19,104	62.66%	178	0.58%	7,900	25.91%	30,486
Roanoke County	26,480	62.34%	15,822	37.25%	176	0.41%	−10,658	−25.09%	42,478
Rockbridge	6,883	68.54%	3,126	31.13%	34	0.34%	−3,757	−37.41%	10,043
Rockingham	25,672	71.72%	9,994	27.92%	131	0.37%	−15,678	−43.80%	35,797
Russell	7,451	83.77%	1,418	15.94%	26	0.29%	−6,033	−67.82%	8,895
Salem	5,664	60.46%	3,663	39.10%	41	0.44%	−2,001	−21.36%	9,368
Scott	6,276	85.77%	1,026	14.02%	15	0.21%	−5,250	−71.75%	7,317
Shenandoah	13,020	72.25%	4,937	27.40%	63	0.35%	−8,083	−44.86%	18,020
Smyth	8,070	81.18%	1,843	18.54%	28	0.28%	−6,227	−62.64%	9,941
Southampton	4,698	63.44%	2,698	36.43%	9	0.12%	−2,000	−27.01%	7,405
Spotsylvania	31,187	52.53%	28,020	47.19%	165	0.28%	−3,167	−5.33%	59,372
Stafford	30,186	48.17%	32,279	51.51%	201	0.32%	2,093	3.34%	62,666
Staunton	4,586	42.98%	6,043	56.64%	40	0.37%	1,457	13.66%	10,669
Suffolk	17,131	41.30%	24,265	58.50%	83	0.20%	7,134	17.20%	41,479
Surry	1,778	49.75%	1,789	50.06%	7	0.20%	11	0.31%	3,574
Sussex	1,854	48.46%	1,965	51.36%	7	0.18%	111	2.90%	3,826
Tazewell	10,533	83.60%	2,044	16.22%	23	0.18%	−8,489	−67.37%	12,600
Virginia Beach	82,620	49.12%	85,191	50.65%	387	0.23%	2,571	1.53%	168,198
Warren	10,888	67.68%	5,145	31.98%	55	0.34%	−5,743	−35.70%	16,088
Washington	16,326	78.08%	4,515	21.59%	68	0.33%	−11,811	−56.49%	20,909
Waynesboro	4,280	50.87%	4,111	48.86%	23	0.27%	−169	−2.01%	8,414
Westmoreland	4,614	57.08%	3,457	42.77%	12	0.15%	−1,157	−14.31%	8,083
Williamsburg	1,931	29.13%	4,668	70.43%	29	0.44%	2,737	41.29%	6,628
Winchester	3,803	43.87%	4,831	55.73%	34	0.39%	1,028	11.86%	8,668
Wise	8,993	81.96%	1,956	17.83%	23	0.21%	−7,037	−64.14%	10,972
Wythe	8,747	79.53%	2,229	20.27%	23	0.21%	−6,518	−59.26%	10,999
York	16,906	54.04%	14,294	45.69%	83	0.27%	−2,612	−8.35%	31,283
Totals	1,577,843	46.45%	1,804,940	53.14%	13,716	0.40%	227,097	6.69%	3,396,499

Counties and independent cities that flipped from Republican to Democratic

- Chesapeake (independent city)
- Chesterfield (largest municipality: Chester)
- James City (largest municipality: Williamsburg)
- Montgomery (largest municipality: Blacksburg)
- Northampton (largest municipality: Exmore)
- Radford (independent city)
- Stafford (largest municipality: Aquia Harbour)
- Virginia Beach (independent city)

=== By congressional district ===
Jones won six of 11 congressional districts.

District	Miyares	Jones	Representative
1st	54.0%	45.6%	Rob Wittman
2nd	50.4%	49.4%	Jen Kiggans
3rd	30.8%	68.9%	Bobby Scott
4th	32.5%	67.1%	Jennifer McClellan
5th	57.1%	42.6%	John McGuire
6th	62.1%	37.5%	Ben Cline
7th	46.2%	53.5%	Eugene Vindman
8th	24.9%	74.3%	Don Beyer
9th	71.5%	28.2%	Morgan Griffith
10th	44.3%	55.2%	Suhas Subramanyam
11th	31.2%	68.1%	James Walkinshaw

== Exit poll ==
Miyares had the best performance among the three statewide Republicans in the 2025 Virginia elections. Miyares benefitted from ticket splitting among White and Hispanic voters, winning a majority of Latino men and Whites, while Jones won Black and Asian voters by large margins.

=== CNN exit poll ===
2025 Virginia gubernatorial election voter demographics (CNN)
Demographic subgroup	Jones	Miyares	% of total vote
Ideology
Liberals	91	9	33
Moderates	63	37	33
Conservatives	8	91	35
Party
Democrats	95	4	36
Republicans	4	96	31
Independents	53	46	33
Donald Trump job approval
Approve	3	97	39
Disapprove	89	11	59
Most important issue facing Virginia
Economy	60	39	48
Health care	75	24	21
Education	50	49	11
Immigration	11	89	11
2024 presidential vote
Kamala Harris	93	7	51
Donald Trump	4	96	42
Another candidate	48	51	2
Did not vote	64	35	3
Gender
Men	44	55	47
Women	60	39	53
Income
$200,000 or more	60	40	14
$100,000-$199,999	48	52	28
$50,000-$99,999	55	44	31
Less than $50,000	58	41	26
Race/ethnicity
White	42	58	71
Asian	77	22	4
Latino	61	39	5
Black	89	11	16
White born-again or evangelical Christian?
Yes	15	84	28
No	66	34	72
Race by gender
White men	34	66	34
White women	49	50	36
Black men	85	14	7
Black women	92	8	9
Latino men	45	54	2
Latina women	74	26	2
All other voters	70	29	9
Age
18–29 years old	62	37	13
30–44 years old	58	41	20
45-64 years old	50	50	35
65 and older	48	51	32
Area type
Urban	61	39	19
Suburban	54	45	57
Rural	43	56	24
Education
College graduate	58	42	52
No college degree	47	52	48
Education by race
White college graduates	51	49	38
Non-white college graduates	77	23	14
Whites without college	32	68	33
Non-whites without college	81	19	15
Education by gender and race
White women with college degrees	59	41	20
White women without college degrees	37	63	16
White men with college degrees	42	58	18
White men without college degrees	26	73	17
Voters of color	79	21	30
Educational attainment
Advanced degree	62	37	23
Bachelor's degree	54	45	29
Associate's degree	50	49	10
Some college	51	48	17
Never attended college	42	57	21

== See also ==
- 2025 United States elections
- 2025 Virginia elections
- 2025 Virginia gubernatorial election
- 2025 Virginia lieutenant gubernatorial election
- 2025 Virginia House of Delegates election

== Notes ==
Partisan clients
