= Terry McAuliffe =

Governor of Virginia from 2014 to 2018

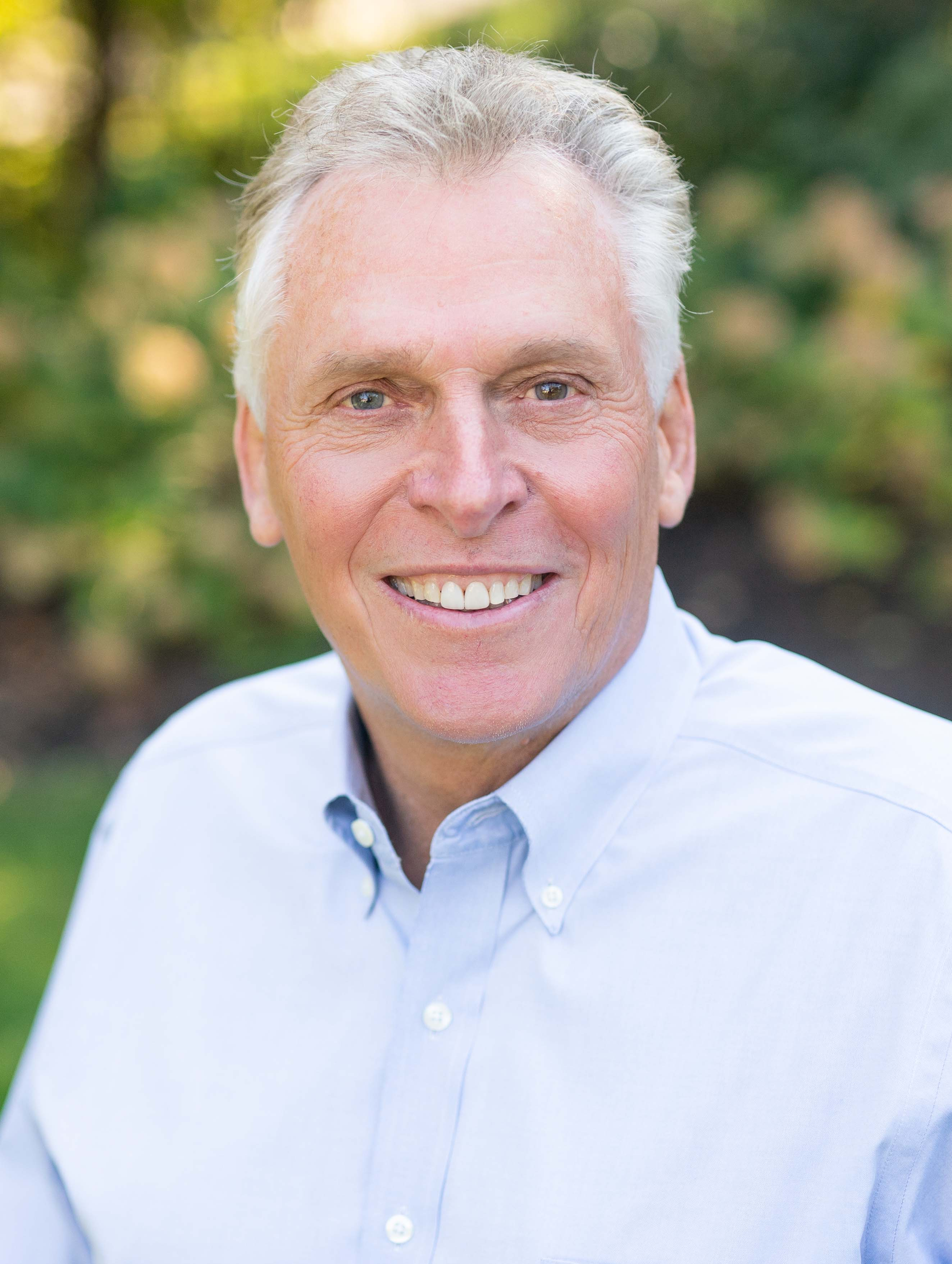
- McAuliffe in 2020

72nd Governor of Virginia
- In office January 11, 2014 – January 13, 2018
- Lieutenant: Ralph Northam
- Preceded by: Bob McDonnell
- Succeeded by: Ralph Northam

Chair of the National Governors Association
- In office July 17, 2016 – July 16, 2017
- Preceded by: Gary Herbert
- Succeeded by: Brian Sandoval

Chair of the Democratic National Committee
- In office February 3, 2001 – February 12, 2005
- Preceded by: Ed Rendell (General Chair); Joe Andrew (National Chair)
- Succeeded by: Howard Dean

Personal details
- Born: Terence Richard McAuliffe; February 9, 1957 (age 69) Syracuse, New York, U.S.
- Party: Democratic
- Spouse: Dorothy Swann (m. 1988)
- Children: 5
- Education: Catholic University of America (BA); Georgetown University (JD)
- Website: Official website

Terence Richard McAuliffe (born February 9, 1957) is an American businessman and politician who served as the 72nd governor of Virginia from 2014 to 2018. A member of the Democratic Party, he was co-chairman of President Bill Clinton's 1996 reelection campaign, co-chairman of the 1997 Presidential Inaugural Committee, chairman of the 2000 Democratic National Convention, chairman of the Democratic National Committee from 2001 to 2005 and chairman of Hillary Clinton's 2008 presidential campaign.

McAuliffe was an unsuccessful candidate for the Democratic nomination in the 2009 Virginia gubernatorial election. In the 2013 gubernatorial election, after he ran unopposed in the Democratic primary, he defeated Republican Ken Cuccinelli and Libertarian Robert Sarvis in the general election. Due to Virginia law barring governors from serving consecutive terms, he was succeeded by his lieutenant governor, Ralph Northam. McAuliffe ran for a non-consecutive second term as governor in the 2021 gubernatorial election but lost to Republican nominee Glenn Youngkin.

Throughout McAuliffe's term in office, the state had a Republican-controlled legislature and McAuliffe issued a then-record number of vetoes for a Virginia governor; the record was later surpassed by Youngkin. As governor, McAuliffe focused heavily on economic development and restored voting rights to a record number of released felons. During his final year in office, he responded to the Unite the Right rally in Charlottesville, condemning the rally and calling for the removal of Confederate monuments from public spaces throughout Virginia; Northam began the removal of these monuments a few years later.

== Early life and education ==
Terence Richard McAuliffe was born on February 9, 1957, and raised in Syracuse, New York, the son of Mildred Katherine (née Lonergan) and Jack McAuliffe. His father was a real estate agent and local Democratic politician. The family is of Irish descent.

In 1975, McAuliffe graduated from Bishop Ludden Junior/Senior High School. In 1979, he earned a bachelor's degree from the Catholic University of America, where he served as a resident adviser. After graduating, McAuliffe worked for President Jimmy Carter's re-election campaign, becoming the national finance director at age 22. Following the unsuccessful campaign, McAuliffe attended Georgetown University Law Center, where he obtained his Juris Doctor degree in 1984.

== Business career ==
At the age of 14, McAuliffe started his first business, McAuliffe Driveway Maintenance, sealing driveways and parking lots.

In 1985, McAuliffe helped found the Federal City National Bank, a Washington, D.C.–based local bank. In January 1988, when he was thirty years old, the bank's board elected him as chairman, making him the youngest chairman in the United States Federal Reserve Bank's charter association. In 1991, he negotiated a merger with Credit International Bank, which he called his "greatest business experience." He became the vice-chairman of the newly merged bank.

In 1979, McAuliffe met Richard Swann, a lawyer who was in charge of the fundraising for Jimmy Carter's presidential campaign in Florida. In 1988, he married Swann's daughter, Dorothy. McAuliffe purchased some of American Pioneer's real estate from the Resolution Trust Corporation. His equal partner in the deal was a pension fund controlled by the International Brotherhood of Electrical Workers (IBEW) and the National Electrical Contractors Association (NECA). They purchased real estate valued at $50 million for $38.7 million; McAuliffe received a 50% equity stake. In 1996, he acquired a distressed housebuilding company, American Heritage Homes, which was on the brink of bankruptcy. He served as chairman of American Heritage. By 1998, he had built American Heritage Homes into one of Central Florida's biggest homebuilding companies. By 1999, the company was building more than 1,000 single family homes per year. In late 2002, KB Home bought American Heritage Homes for $74 million.

In 1997, McAuliffe invested $100,000 as an angel investor in Global Crossing, a Bermuda–registered telecommunications company. Global Crossing went public in 1998. In 1999, he sold most of his holdings for $8.1 million.

McAuliffe joined ZeniMax Media as company advisor in 2000.

In 2009, McAuliffe joined GreenTech Automotive, as a non-executive chairman. GreenTech, a holding company, purchased Chinese electric car company EU Auto MyCar for $20 million in May 2010. Later that year, he relocated GreenTech's headquarters to McLean, Virginia, and the manufacturing plant was later based in Mississippi. In December 2012, he announced his resignation from GreenTech to focus on his run for governor of Virginia. In 2013, the U.S. Securities and Exchange Commission investigated GreenTech Automotive and McAuliffe for visa fraud. He attempted to gain tax credits from the Virginia Economic Development Partnership (VEDP), the state's business recruitment agency, to build GreenTech Automotive's factory in Virginia. He refused to supply the VEDP with proper documentation of their business strategy and investors, which caused the VEDP to decline economic incentives for GreenTech Automotive. He later falsely claimed during his gubernatorial run that the VEDP was uncooperative and uninterested in GreenTech Automotive.

In 2017, 32 GreenTech Automotive investors from China sued McAuliffe, Anthony Rodham, and others for fraud. The plaintiffs alleged that McAuliffe and his co-defendants promised to obtain EB-5 visas for the Chinese plaintiffs in exchange for $560,000 investments from each of them into GreenTech Automotive; however, the Department of Homeland Security did not provide the visas due to GreenTech's failure to generate the number of jobs required for the visas to be issued under the EB-5 program. In February 2018 the firm declared bankruptcy, and the following month a federal judge dismissed McAuliffe from the lawsuit.

According to The Washington Post, he has "earned millions as a banker, real estate developer, home builder, hotel owner, and internet venture capitalist."

== Early political career ==
=== Relationship with the Clintons ===
McAuliffe had a prolific fundraising career within the Democratic Party and a personal and political relationship with Bill and Hillary Clinton. McAuliffe and his staff raised $275 million, then an unprecedented amount, for Clinton's causes while president. After Bill Clinton's tenure ended, he guaranteed the Clintons' $1.35 million mortgage for their home in Chappaqua, New York. The deal raised ethical questions. In 1999, he served as chairman of America's Millennium Celebration under Clinton. In 2000, he chaired a fundraiser with the Clintons to benefit Vice President Al Gore, setting a fundraising record of $26.3 million.

McAuliffe told to The New York Times in 1999, "I've met all of my business contacts through politics. It's all interrelated." When he meets a new business contact, he continued, "Then I raise money from them." He acknowledged that the success of his business dealings stemmed partly from his relationship with Bill Clinton, saying, "No question, that's a piece of it." He also credited his ties to former congressmen Dick Gephardt and Tony Coelho, his Rolodex of 5,000-plus names, and his ability to personally relate to people. In 2004, he was one of the five-member board of directors of the Clinton Foundation. He remained on the board until 2013, re-joining it in 2024. He told New York Times reporter Mark Leibovich in 2012 that his Rolodex held 18,632 names.

=== 2000 Democratic National Convention ===
In June 2000, as organizers of the 2000 Democratic National Convention were working to raise $7 million, convention chairman Roy Romer resigned to become superintendent of the Los Angeles Unified School District. McAuliffe immediately accepted appointment as Romer's replacement when asked on a phone call by presumptive presidential nominee Al Gore. Already in the news for a record $26 million fundraiser with Bill Clinton the month prior, he promised that money would be a "non-issue" for the convention, and that the outstanding $7 million would be raised "very quickly". Many in the party praised his selection, which was widely seen to represent the growth in his influence, with James Carville telling The New York Times that "his stock is trading at an all-time high".

=== Chair of the Democratic National Committee ===
In February 2001, McAuliffe was elected chairman of the Democratic National Committee (DNC) and served until February 2005. During his tenure, the DNC raised $578 million and emerged from debt for the first time in its history. Prior to serving as chairman of the DNC, he served as chairman of the DNC Business Leadership Forum in 1993 and as the DNC finance chairman in 1994.

In 2001, McAuliffe founded the Voting Rights Institute. In June 2001, he announced the founding of the Hispanic Voter Outreach Project to reach more Hispanic voters. The same year, he founded the Women's Vote Center to educate, engage and mobilize women at the local level to run for office.

In the period between the elections of 2002 and the 2004 Democratic convention, the DNC rebuilt operations and intra-party alliances. McAuliffe worked to restructure the Democratic primary schedule, allowing Arizona, Michigan, New Mexico, and South Carolina to vote earlier; the move provided African-American and Hispanic/Latino communities as well as labor unions greater inclusion in presidential primaries. According to The Washington Post, the move bolstered United States Senator John Kerry's fundraising efforts. The DNC rebuilt its headquarters and McAuliffe built the Democratic Party's first National Voter File, a computer database of more than 175 million names known as "Demzilla." During the 2004 election cycle, the DNC hosted six presidential debates for the first time.

As chairman, McAuliffe championed direct mail and online donations and built a small donor base that eliminated the party's debt and, according to The Washington Post, "could potentially power the party for years". Under his leadership, the DNC raised a total of $248 million from donors giving $25,000 or less during the 2003–2004 election cycle.

In January 2005, a few weeks before his term ended, McAuliffe earmarked $5 million of the party's cash to assist Tim Kaine and other Virginia Democrats in their upcoming elections. This donation was the largest non-presidential disbursement in DNC history, and was part of his attempt to prove Democratic viability in Southern states in the wake of the 2004 presidential election. Kaine was successful in his bid, and served as the governor of Virginia from 2006 to 2010.

=== Post-DNC ===
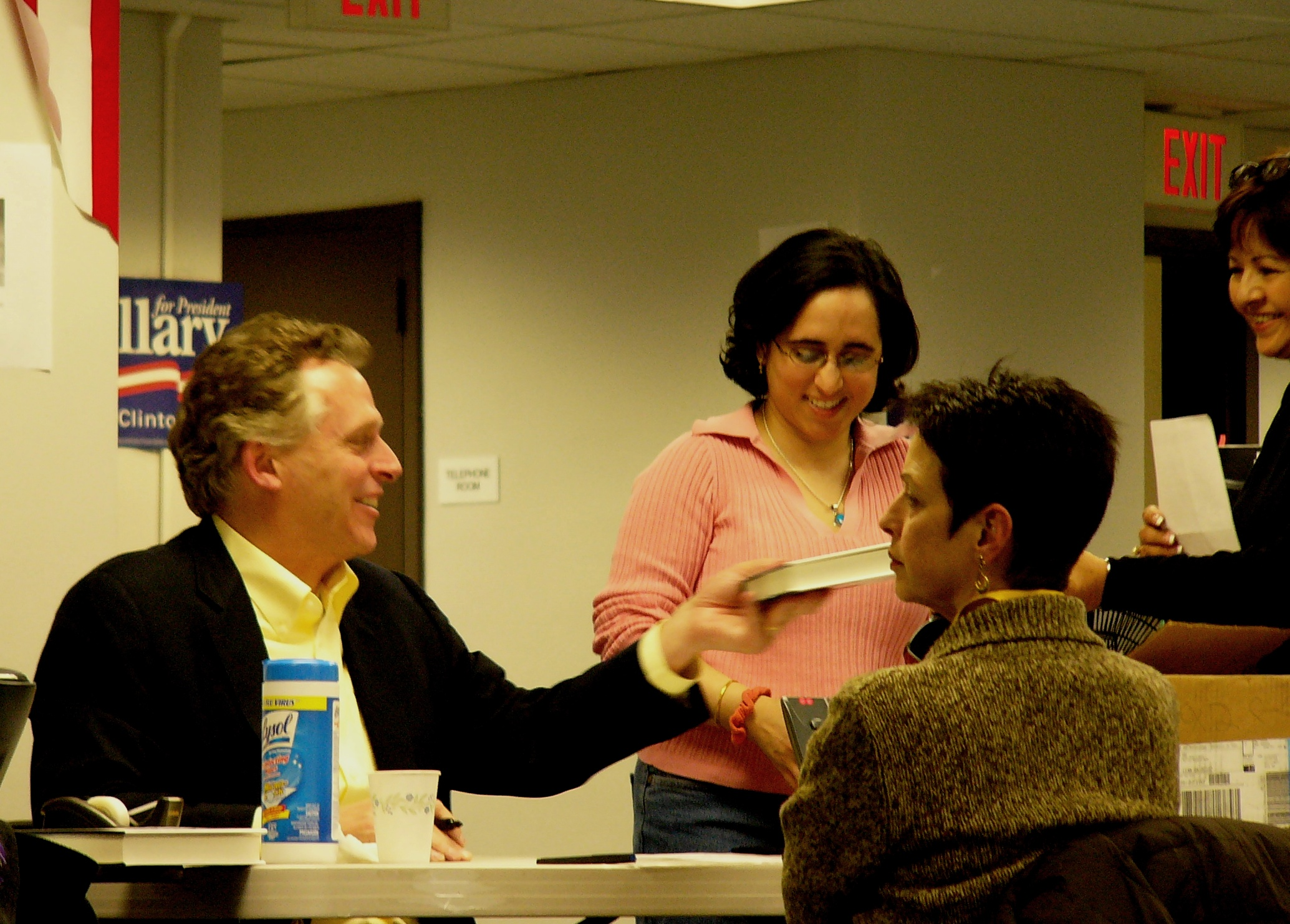
McAuliffe with staffers and volunteers at Hillary Clinton's 2008 presidential campaign headquarters

McAuliffe was co-chair of the Hillary Clinton 2008 presidential campaign and one of her superdelegates at the 2008 Democratic National Convention.

In 2012, he was a visiting fellow at Harvard University's John F. Kennedy School of Government. In addition to several faculty and student lectures, McAuliffe hosted a segment entitled "The Making of a Candidate: From Running Campaigns to Running on my Own."

In August 2026, McAuliffe spoke at a Democratic National Committee meeting in Austin, Texas, where he addressed internal party disputes, telling Democrats to stop "hand-wringing" and "lemon-sucking” in order to capitalize on the “best political position we have been in a decade.”

==== 2009 gubernatorial campaign ====
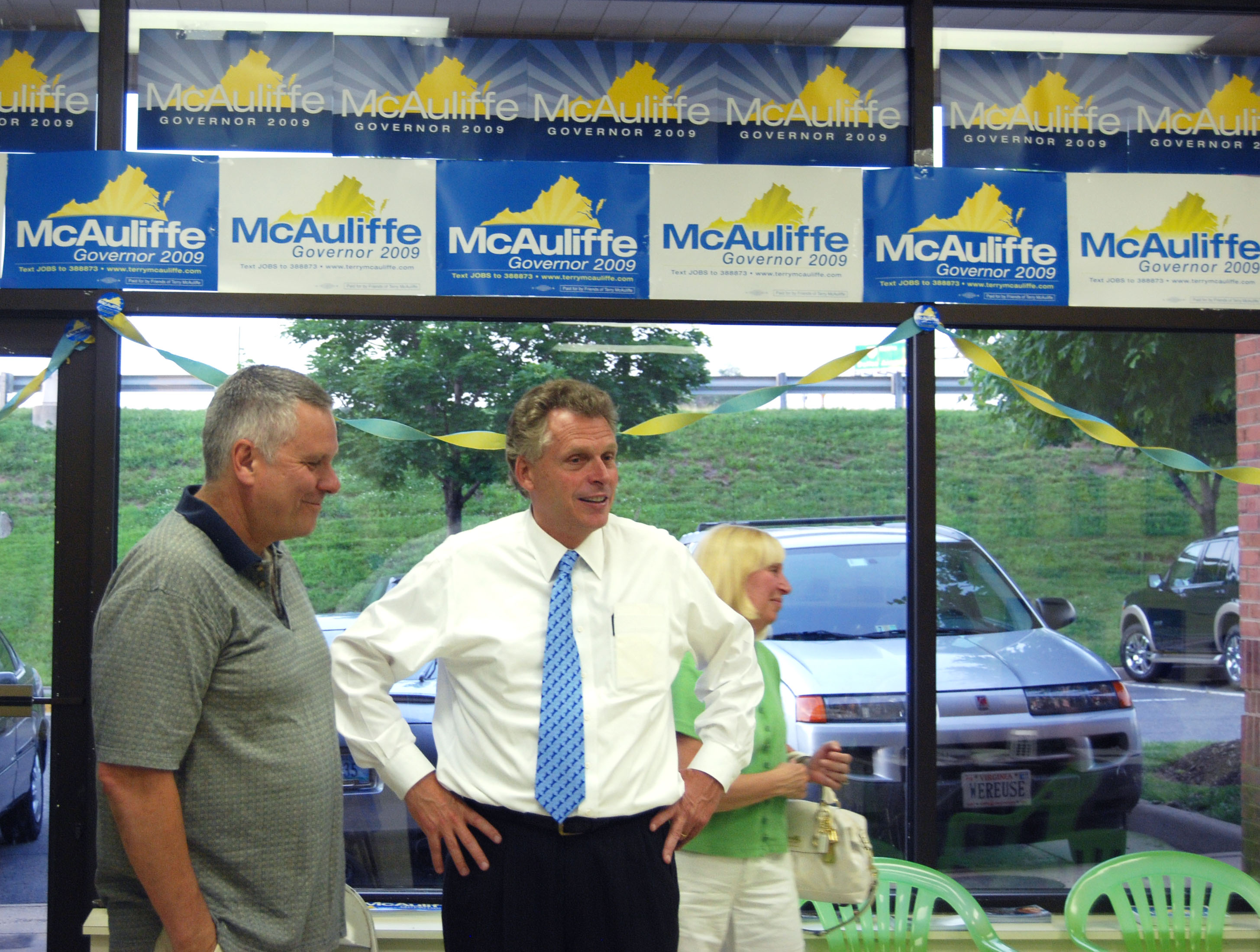
McAuliffe campaigning for governor, 2009

On November 10, 2008, McAuliffe formed an exploratory committee for the Virginia gubernatorial election in 2009. According to The Washington Post, he believed he would prevail "because he [could] campaign as a business leader who can bring jobs to Virginia." He also cited his ability to raise money for down-ticket Democratic candidates.

In the primary election, he faced two high-profile Democrats, state senator Creigh Deeds, the 2005 Democratic nominee for Attorney General of Virginia, and Brian Moran, a former Virginia House of Delegates Minority Leader. On June 9, 2009, McAuliffe placed second with 26% of the vote; Deeds and Moran garnered 50% and 24%, respectively.

== Governor of Virginia (2014–2018) ==
=== 2013 election ===
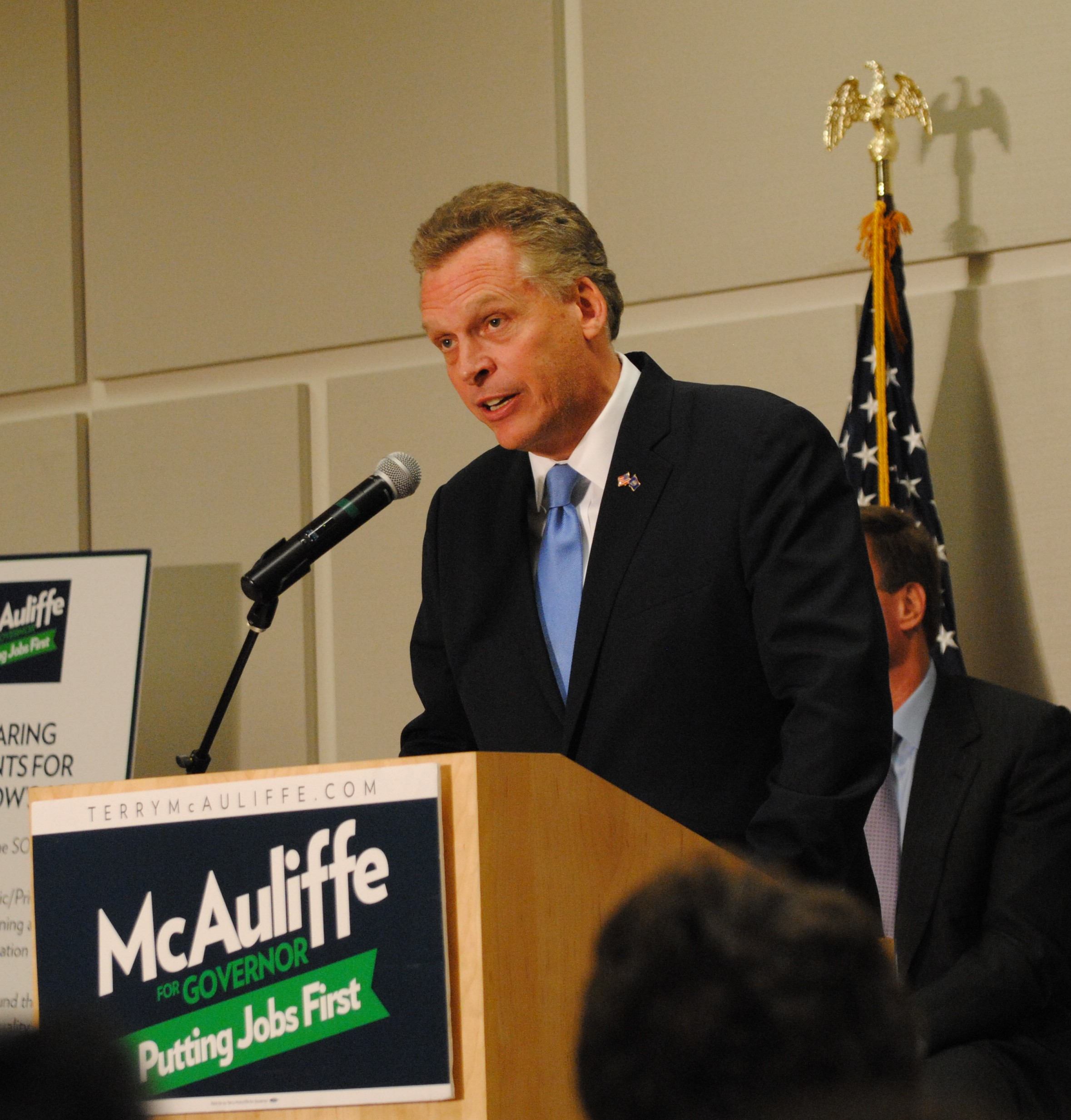
McAuliffe campaigning for governor, 2013

On November 8, 2012, McAuliffe emailed supporters announcing his intention to run for governor of Virginia in 2013. In his email he stated, "It is absolutely clear to me that Virginians want their next Governor to focus on job creation and common sense fiscal responsibility instead of divisive partisan issues."

On April 2, 2013, McAuliffe became the Democratic nominee, as he ran unopposed. In the general, he campaigned against Republican nominee (and sitting attorney general of Virginia) Ken Cuccinelli, and Libertarian nominee Robert Sarvis. He won 47.8% of the vote; Cuccinelli and Sarvis garnered 45.2% and 6.5%, respectively. He broke a 40-year trend and was the first candidate of the sitting president's party elected governor of Virginia since 1973.

=== Tenure ===
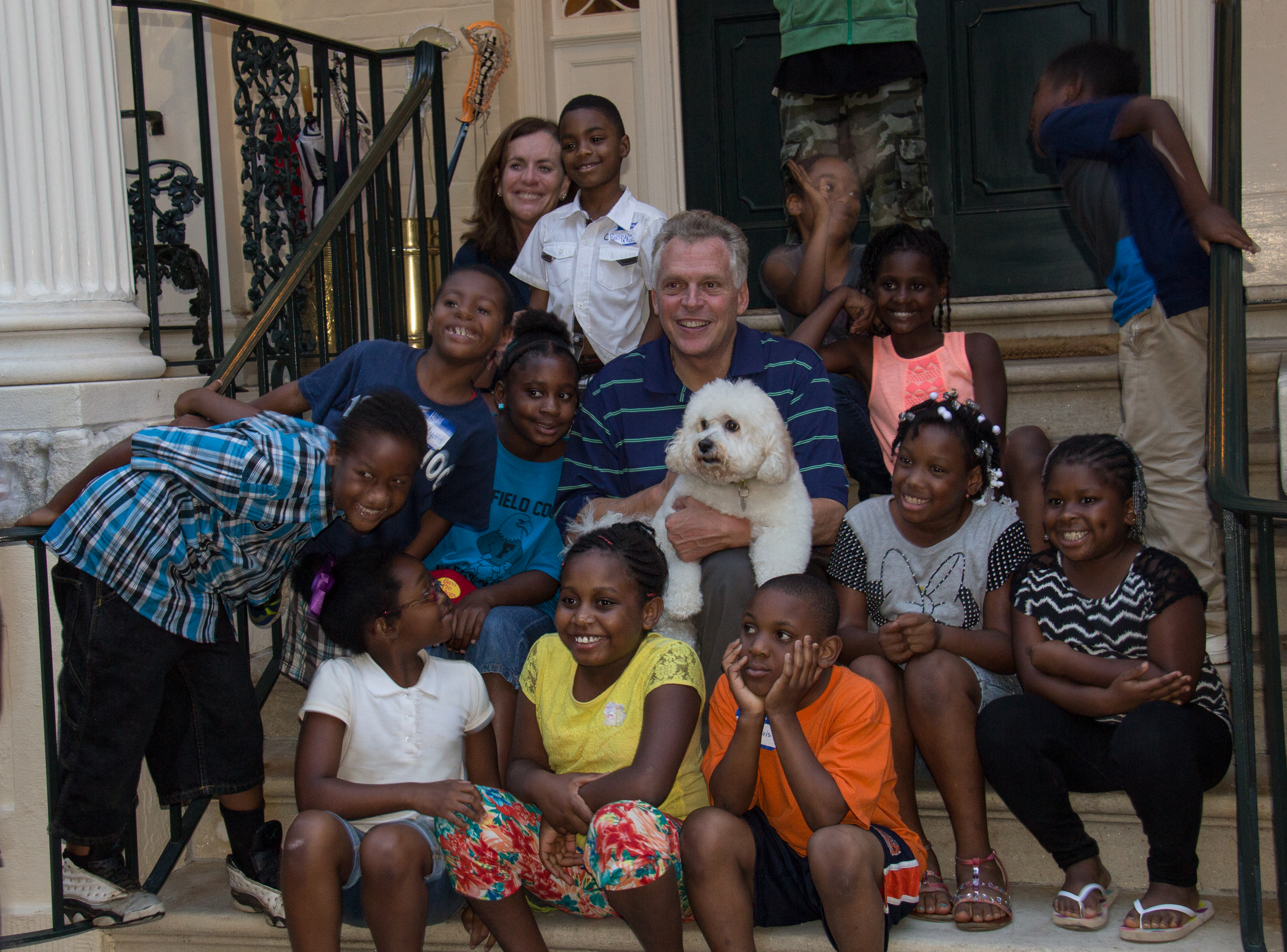
McAuliffe and the inaugural VSP Capital Campout, 2015

McAuliffe took the oath of office on January 11, 2014. Following the ceremony, he signed four executive orders, including one instituting a ban on gifts over $100 to members of the administration, and an order prohibiting discrimination against state employees for sexual orientation and gender identity. The other executive orders dealt with government continuity.

As governor, McAuliffe issued a record 120 vetoes. He vetoed more bills than his three predecessors combined. He vetoed bills mainly concerning social legislation, including abortion and LGBT rights, along with the environment and voting rights. Throughout his term, the state legislature did not overturn any of the vetoes he issued. During his tenure, Virginia collected more than $20 billion in new capital investment, $7 billion more than any previous governor. He participated in more than 35 trade and marketing missions to five continents, more than any other preceding governor, to promote state tourism and other products.

In 2014, President Barack Obama appointed McAuliffe to the Council of Governors. That same year, the Chesapeake Bay Program appointed him to chair its executive council. He was elected as vice chair of the National Governors Association in July 2015 and became chair of the organization in July 2016. In June 2016, the Biotechnology Innovation Organization named him "Governor of the Year".

During his term, unemployment fell from 5.7% to 3.3% and personal income rose by 14.19%. PolitiFact noted McAuliffe, like many other governors, had little control over their state's economic performance, with Virginia's economy following national trends. That year, he was named Public Official of the Year by Governing Magazine. He was also named one of StateScoop's State Executives of the year. From 2015 and even into 2021, he has repeated false claims that he "inherited" a budget deficit for his tenure, when in fact the previous governor left two balanced budgets bills based on anticipated revenues, but subsequent economic issues caused revenue to fall.

McAuliffe maintained strong job approval ratings among registered voters in Virginia, but he was less popular than Bob McDonnell, Tim Kaine, and Mark Warner.

==== Healthcare reform ====
After the Republican-controlled Virginia House of Delegates blocked his plans to expand Medicaid, McAuliffe unveiled his own plan titled "A Healthy Virginia." He authorized four emergency regulations and issued one executive order allowing for use of federal funds (made available by the Affordable Care Act to any state seeking to expand its Medicaid program to increase the number of poor citizens who had access to health insurance). His last hope for full Medicaid expansion ended when a Democratic state senator, Phillip Puckett of Russell County, resigned from his Republican-leaning seat. As a result, Virginia Democrats' razor-thin majority in the state senate flipped in favor of the Republicans, giving them control of both chambers of the state's legislature.

==== Economic development ====
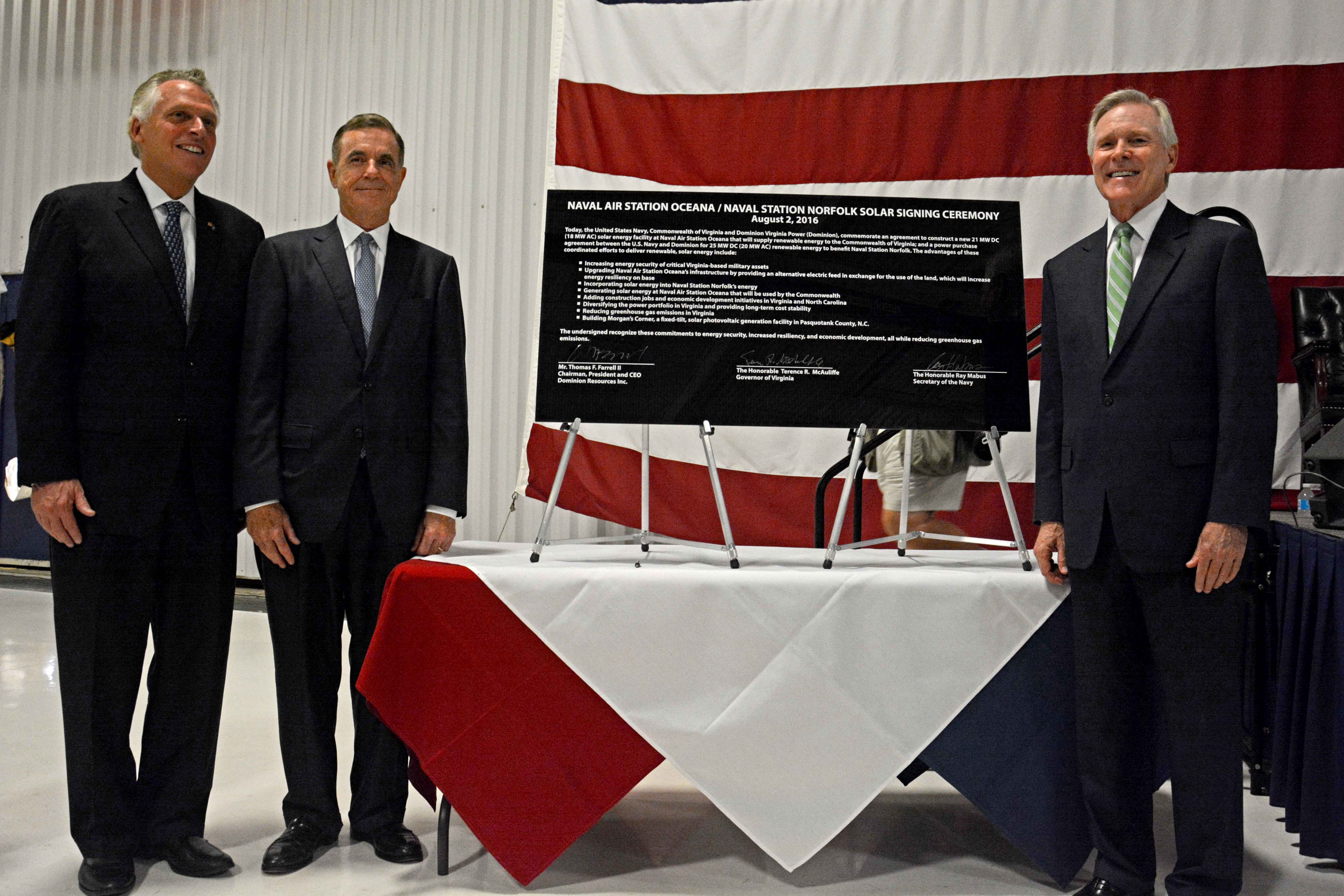
McAuliffe with CEO of Dominion Resources Inc. Thomas F. Farrell II and Secretary of the Navy Ray Mabus, after signing a ceremonial solar panel, August 2, 2016

He helped close a deal to bring Stone Brewing to Richmond and landed a $2 billion paper plant in the Richmond suburbs. He helped broker a deal with the Corporate Executive Board to move its global headquarters in Arlington which created 800 new jobs. He worked on deals to restore service in Norfolk from Carnival Cruise Lines and Air China service to Dulles International Airport. In February 2016, he announced that Virginia was the first state to functionally end veteran homelessness. In 2017, he announced that Nestle USA was moving its headquarters from California to Virginia. He had worked with the company for more than a year to secure the move. He also helped with bringing Amazon's second headquarters to Virginia in 2018.

==== Voting rights ====
In April 2016, McAuliffe signed an executive order restoring voting rights to more than 200,000 ex-offenders in Virginia who had completed their prison sentences and periods of parole or probation. The order allowed this group to register to vote. Virginia was, at the time, one of 12 states with lifetime felon disenfranchisement, barring ex-offenders from voting even after their sentences are complete.

McAuliffe's order was initially overturned by the Supreme Court of Virginia, which ruled that the Constitution of Virginia did not allow the governor to grant blanket pardons and restorations of rights. In August 2016, he announced that he had restored the voting rights to almost 13,000 felons individually using an autopen. Republican leadership in the state filed a contempt-of-court motion against McAuliffe for the action, which the court dismissed. By the end of his term, he had restored voting rights for 173,000 released felons, more than any governor in U.S. history. The blanket restoration was controversial; several Democratic Commonwealth's Attorneys opposed McAuliffe's blanket restoration, including Theo Stamos of Arlington County and Falls Church City, Ray Morrogh of Fairfax County, and Paul Ebert of Prince William County. Progressive challengers Steve Descano and Parisa Dehghani-Tafti supported by McAuliffe defeated Stamos and Morrogh, respectively, in primary elections in 2019; Ebert retired.

==== FBI investigation ====
On May 23, 2016, CNN reported that the Federal Bureau of Investigation was investigating McAuliffe "over whether donations to his gubernatorial campaign violated the law." One example cited was a $120,000 donation from Chinese businessman Wang Wenliang. No action was taken, as Wang's status as a legal permanent resident of the United States could make the donation legal under U.S. election law.

==== Immigration ====
On January 31, 2017, McAuliffe appeared with Attorney General Mark Herring to announce that Virginia was joining the lawsuit Aziz v. Trump, challenging President Donald Trump's immigration executive order. On March 27, 2017, he vetoed a bill that would have prevented sanctuary cities in Virginia.

==== Death penalty ====
While describing himself as "personally opposed" to death penalty, McAuliffe presided over the three last executions carried in Virginia, before it was abolished in 2021 under his successor Ralph Northam. He also commuted two death sentences, that of Ivan Teleguz and William Joseph Burns.

==== Unite the Right rally ====
McAuliffe was governor during the Unite the Right rally in Charlottesville. He condemned the rally saying, "I have a message to all the white supremacists and the Nazis who came into Charlottesville today. Our message is plain and simple: Go home. . . . There is no place for you here, there is no place for you in America." Although at the start of his governorship, McAuliffe was opposed to removing Confederate monuments from public spaces, he reversed his position after the rally. Skepticism remains over his role in how the police initially responded to the rally, and whether he allowed the conflict to escalate for political purposes.

==== Pardons ====
McAuliffe pardoned 227 people during his tenure, the most of any Virginia governor, and three times as many as his predecessor Bob McDonnell. In 2017, he granted pardons to the Norfolk Four, a group of U.S. Navy sailors who were wrongly convicted of a 1997 rape and murder and were declared actually innocent by a federal court in 2016. He rejected an application for pardon by Jens Söring, who had been convicted for double murder. In January 2018, McAuliffe pardoned 6 Virginians who were given excessive sentences, including Travion Blount, who was convicted and given six life sentences at age 15 for robbery.

== Post-governorship ==
After the 2016 presidential election, McAuliffe was viewed as a potential candidate for the Democratic nomination for president in 2020. In 2017, McAuliffe's confidantes told The Hill he was "seriously considering a 2020 presidential run." McAuliffe told a group of union leaders "If I can wrestle an alligator, I can certainly wrestle Donald Trump," referencing his wrestling match with an alligator to secure a political donation. In April 2019, McAuliffe announced that he would not pursue the presidency in 2020 and would focus on supporting Democrats in the 2019 Virginia elections.

In February 2018, he began serving as the state engagement chair of the National Democratic Redistricting Committee. He is currently a senior advisor at the MarTech startup, Applecart.

In January 2022, after losing his re-election bid for Governor, a website was launched for Common Good, an organization founded by McAuliffe to "[help] Democratic campaigns and organizations win critical races in Virginia and across the country."

In 2025, former president Joe Biden appointed McAuliffe to the Board of Trustees of the Woodrow Wilson International Center for Scholars. Shortly after, Trump revoked the appointment.

McAuliffe joined Natural Allies for a Clean Energy Future as a co-chair in November 2025. The organization advocates for the use of natural gas as part of the United States' broader energy-transition strategy.

In January 2026, McAuliffe authored an op-ed with Bob McDonnell, urging policymakers to follow through on the construction for the proposed 9/11 Pentagon Memorial Visitor Education Center.

=== 2021 gubernatorial campaign ===
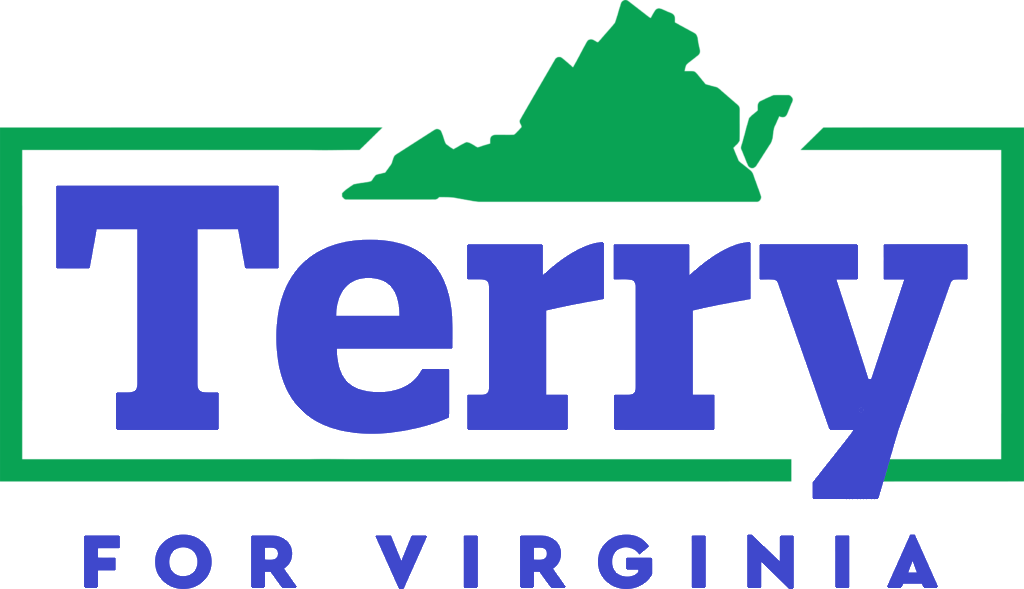
Campaign logo, 2021

==== Primary election ====
Despite the extreme rarity of second-term governors in Virginia (which only allows former governors to run for governor again after another has served in that role) — and despite calls from within Virginia's Democratic party for McAuliffe to stand aside in the 2021 governors' race, to allow two black female Democratic legislators to compete to become the nation's first black woman governor — in December 2020, McAuliffe announced his campaign for governor.

On June 8, 2021, he won the Democratic primary, garnering 62% of the vote, defeating four other candidates, and winning each city and locality in the state.

==== General election ====
In the general election, McAuliffe faced Republican Glenn Youngkin. Their first debate was canceled after Youngkin refused to attend, citing his objection to moderator Judy Woodruff over a donation she made to the Clinton Bush Haiti Fund in 2010. McAuliffe and Youngkin ultimately debated twice, trading attacks. The race was costly, with both sides' campaigns and outside groups raising and spending tens of millions of dollars.

Consistent with his past campaigns, McAuliffe had a backslapping, gregarious campaign style. McAuliffe campaigned on his economic record from his term as governor, supporting infrastructure improvements, voting rights, and Joe Biden's American Rescue Plan.

Education policy was an important factor in the election. McAuliffe criticized Youngkin for running a campaign ad with a supporter who attempted to ban Toni Morrison's novel Beloved from Virginia schools.

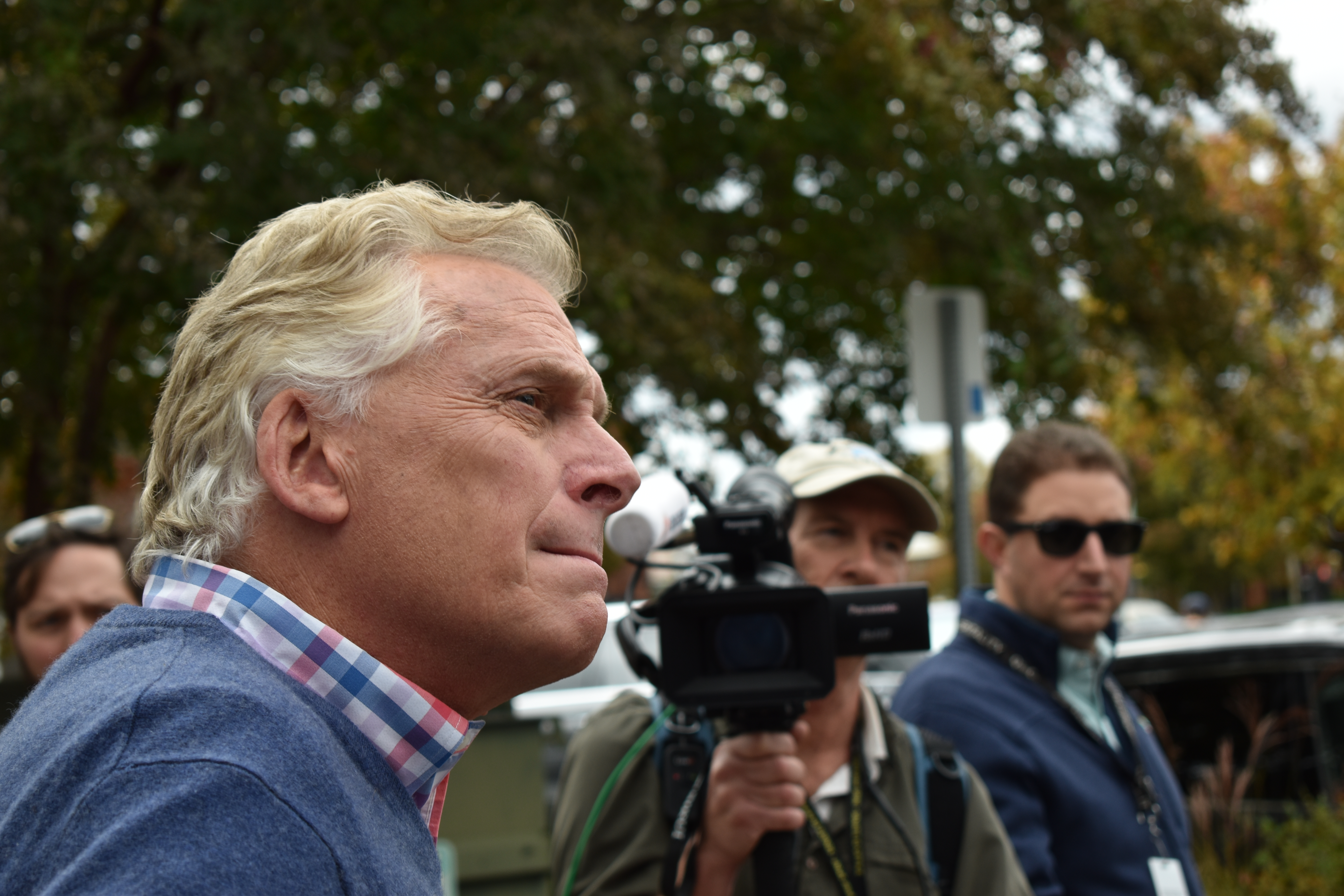
McAuliffe answering press questions during the 2021 gubernatorial campaign

When asked during a debate to explain his veto of a bill that, in the words of The Washington Post, would have allowed "parents to remove books they objected to from school libraries or curriculums", McAuliffe responded, "I don't think parents should be telling schools what they should teach". Although this comment proved unpopular with voters, The Washington Post published an analysis finding that McAuliffe's stance on education likely had little impact on how parents voted. In election exit polls, more than 8 in 10 voters said parents should have at least some input into what schools teach; McAuliffe won with this group of voters, but Youngkin won with voters who said parents should have "a lot" of input into what schools teach. However, exit polls found that both groups swung by the same margin to the right from 2020.

During his campaign, McAuliffe repeatedly cited inflated numbers of the number of daily COVID-19 cases in the state and the number of children hospitalized with COVID-19 in the state, while Youngkin made various false and misleading claims about McAuliffe's positions and record.

Major Democratic figures campaigned with McAuliffe, including Joe Biden, Barack Obama, Stacey Abrams, and Kamala Harris. Television attack ads by both candidates contained false or misleading statements.

The race had been seen as a toss-up, with polling ahead of Election Day showing the candidates in a dead heat.

In the general election, Youngkin defeated McAuliffe with 50.6% of the vote. McAuliffe received 48.6% of the vote, losing by about 64,000 votes.

== Political positions ==
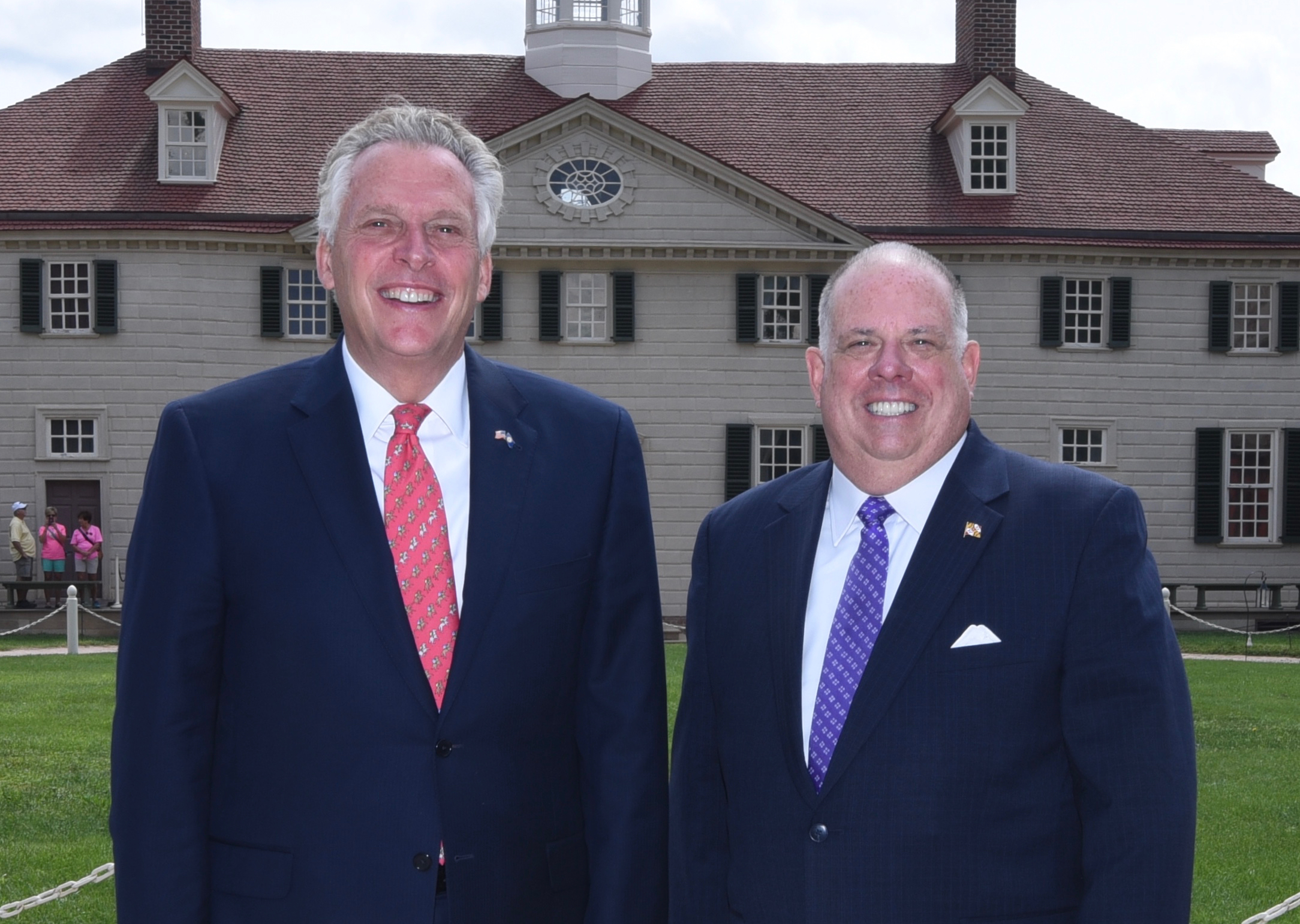
McAuliffe meeting with Maryland governor Larry Hogan in 2017

=== Abortion ===
McAuliffe has been a consistent supporter of abortion rights.

In 2017, he vetoed a bill that would have defunded Planned Parenthood in Virginia.

=== Education ===
McAuliffe has argued for workforce development, with education proposals being funded through savings from the proposed Medicaid expansion.

In his 2013 gubernatorial campaign, McAuliffe pledged to deemphasize the number of standardized tests in schools and reduce the number of them. The General Assembly passed a bipartisan bill in 2015, signed by McAuliffe, that directed the Virginia Board of Education to adopt new accreditation standards that "recognize the progress of schools that do not meet accreditation benchmarks but have significantly improved their pass rates." In 2017, the board, which primarily consisted of McAuliffe appointees, implemented the law and made significant changes to the criteria for accreditation, including reducing the number of standardized tests required for graduation and adding metrics such as absenteeism, achievement gaps, and improvement on the state exams.

In 2016, McAuliffe vetoed a bill that would have allowed parents to block books containing "sexually explicit content" in schools; the bill was known as the "Beloved bill" because its supporters cited the Toni Morrison novel (as well as other books, such as Ralph Ellison's Invisible Man and Cormac McCarthy's The Road) as examples of objectionable works. Republicans and the Family Foundation of Virginia supported the bill; the National Council of Teachers of English and the National Coalition Against Censorship opposed it. McAuliffe vetoed a similar bill in 2017. In 2017, McAuliffe also vetoed Republican-backed legislation to increase the number of charter schools; in vetoing the bill, McAuliffe cited its removal of authority from local school boards to make decisions about local public schools and expressed concern about diverting funding from public schools.

=== Energy and environmental issues ===
McAuliffe believes that human activity has contributed to global warming, and characterizes clean energy as a national security issue. He supports reducing dependence on foreign oil through investment in technologies such as carbon capture and storage, solar farms, and offshore wind turbines. Billionaire environmentalist Tom Steyer and the League of Conservation Voters endorsed him.

In his 2009 campaign, McAuliffe said, "I want to move past coal. As governor, I never want another coal plant built." In his 2013 campaign, he supported tougher safety requirements on coal plants. He also announced his support for the Environmental Protection Agency's Clean Power Plan, which would limit the amount of carbon dioxide that could be emitted by power plants, making it difficult to build new coal-fired plants and to keep old ones operating.

In 2017, McAuliffe asked the federal Bureau of Ocean Energy Management to exclude Virginia's coastal areas from a program to open the East Coast to offshore drilling. In May 2017, he issued an executive order for Virginia to become a member of the Regional Greenhouse Gas Initiative (RGGI) to cut greenhouse gases from power plants. It was the first southern state to join.

=== Gun control ===
McAuliffe supports universal background checks for gun sales, and while governor called for "a renewal of the state's one-a-month limit on handgun purchases...a ban on anyone subject to a protection-from-abuse order from having a gun and the revoking of concealed-handgun permits for parents who are behind on child-support payments." A one-handgun-a-month law was enacted in 2020, under the governorship of successor Ralph Northam. McAuliffe has also called for an assault weapons ban in Virginia. He is a hunter and owns several shotguns.

In January 2016, McAuliffe reached a compromise with Republicans, allowing interstate holders of concealed carry permits in Virginia, nullifying Attorney General Mark Herring's previous ruling, effective February 1, 2016. The deal will also take guns from domestic abusers and will require state police to attend gun shows to provide background checks upon request from private sellers.

=== Healthcare ===
McAuliffe supports the Affordable Care Act, also known as Obamacare. He supports expanding Medicaid, arguing that taxes Virginians pay would return to Virginia.

=== Impeachment ===
In August 2018, McAuliffe stated "that's something we ought to look at", referring to President Trump's impeachment. He argued that if "President Obama had gone to Helsinki and done what President Trump had done, you would already have impeachment hearings going on."

=== Law enforcement ===
In 2021, according to PolitiFact, McAuliffe made a "full flop" on qualified immunity, initially supporting its repeal when attempting to win the support of Democrats in the primary before reversing course in the general election.

=== LGBT rights ===
McAuliffe supports transgender rights and same-sex marriage. He supported the United States Supreme Court rulings in United States v. Windsor (2013) (holding the Defense of Marriage Act unconstitutional) and Obergefell v. Hodges (2015) (recognizing the right of same-sex couples to marry as a fundamental constitutional right).

While running for governor in 2013, McAuliffe declared his support for same-sex marriage, becoming the first candidate to do so. In 2014, he became the first Virginia governor to preside over a same-sex wedding ceremony.

McAuliffe declared his support for transgender students during his campaign in 2021.

=== Transportation ===
McAuliffe supported the bipartisan transportation bill that passed the General Assembly in 2013. He was in favor of the Silver Line, which expanded Metrorail services into Fairfax and Loudoun counties. In May 2011, according to PolitiFact, he made a "pants on fire" claim when he stated Virginia has no mechanism to repay transportation bonds; the commonwealth does in fact have one.

In 2016, McAuliffe helped propose and secure a $165 million federal FASTLINE grant, which was put toward the Atlantic Gateway Project. In 2018, McAuliffe announced a deal that involved adding 10 miles of express lanes to the 1-95 corridor. The project was completed in 2022.

== Personal life ==
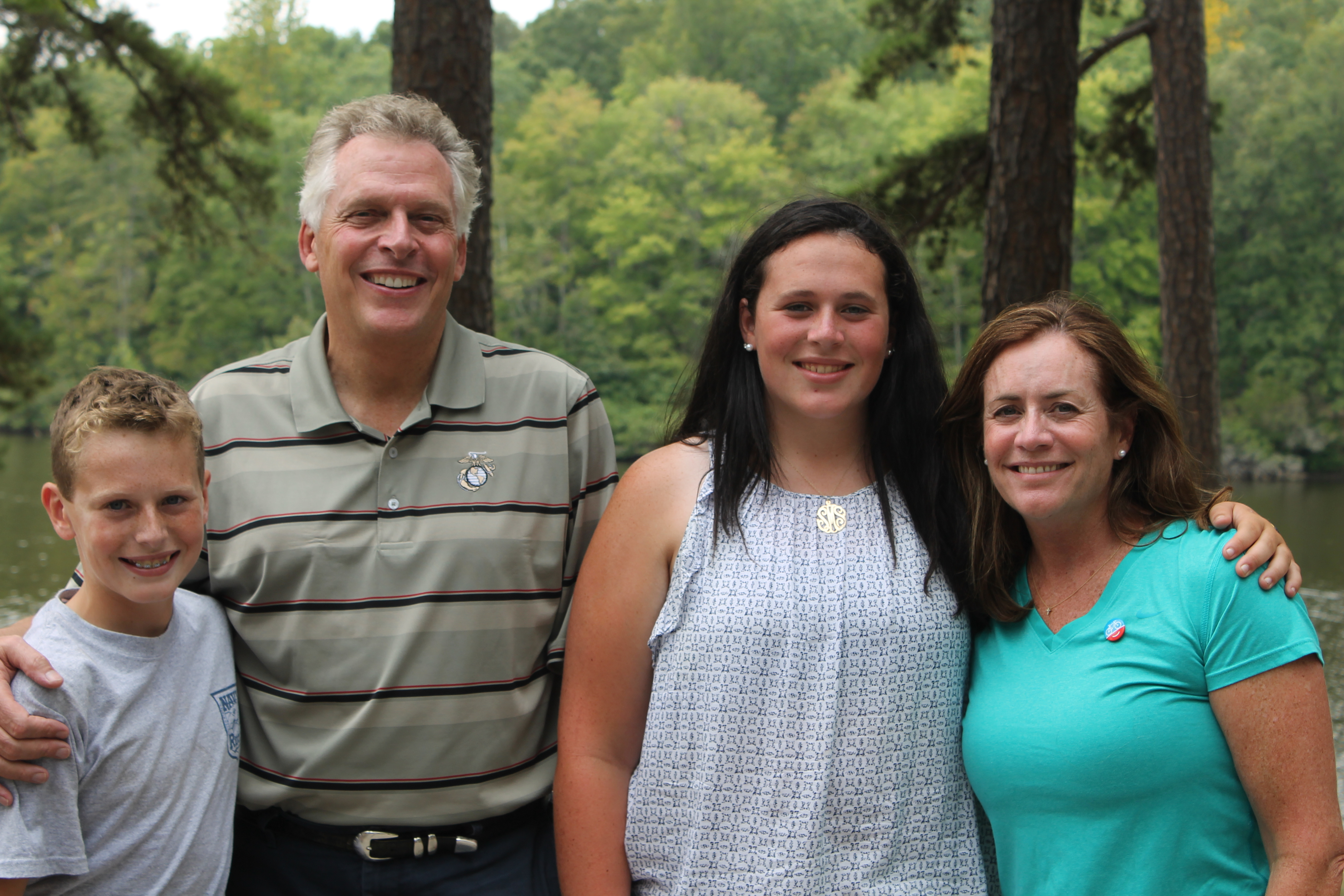
McAuliffe and his family at Twin Lakes State Park, 2015

McAuliffe married Dorothy Swann on October 8, 1988. They reside in McLean, Virginia with their five children. Their son Jack attended the United States Naval Academy and became a Marine. Their daughter, Sally, graduated from Syracuse University in 2022.

In March 2018, George Mason University appointed McAuliffe as a visiting professor.

=== Memoirs ===
McAuliffe authored two books that both appeared on The New York Times Best Seller list.

His memoir, What a Party! My Life Among Democrats: Presidents, Candidates, Donors, Activists, Alligators, and Other Wild Animals, was published in 2007 with Steve Kettmann and made The New York Times Best Seller list, debuting at No. 5 in February 2007. Among anecdotes told in the memoir was McAuliffe wrestling an eight-foot, 260-pound alligator for three minutes to secure a $15,000 contribution for President Jimmy Carter in 1980. He and the alligator would appear on the cover of Life magazine. Others included hunting with King Juan Carlos of Spain, golf outings with President Bill Clinton, and reviving the Democratic National Convention. McAuliffe also wrote about the September 11 attacks and his experiences in the Democratic National Committee office immediately after.

In 2019, McAuliffe wrote a second book in the aftermath of the Unite the Right rally, entitled Beyond Charlottesville, Taking a Stand Against White Nationalism. In August 2019, the book made The New York Times Best Seller list.

== Electoral history ==
2009

2009 Virginia gubernatorial Democratic primary
Party	Candidate	Votes	%
Democratic	Creigh Deeds	158,845	49.77
Democratic	Terry McAuliffe	84,387	26.44
Democratic	Brian Moran	75,936	23.79
Total votes		319,168	100.00

2013

McAuliffe ran unopposed in the 2013 Virginia gubernatorial Democratic primary.

2013 Virginia gubernatorial election
Party	Candidate	Votes	%
Democratic	Terry McAuliffe	1,069,859	47.75
Republican	Ken Cuccinelli	1,013,355	45.23
Libertarian	Robert Sarvis	146,084	6.52
Write-in		11,091	0.50
Total votes		2,240,314	100.00

2021

2021 Virginia gubernatorial Democratic primary
Party	Candidate	Votes	%
Democratic	Terry McAuliffe	307,367	62.10
Democratic	Jennifer Carroll Foy	98,052	19.81
Democratic	Jennifer McClellan	58,213	11.76
Democratic	Justin Fairfax	17,606	3.56
Democratic	Lee J. Carter	13,694	2.77
Total votes		494,932	100.00

2021 Virginia gubernatorial election
Party	Candidate	Votes	%
Republican	Glenn Youngkin	1,663,158	50.58
Democratic	Terry McAuliffe	1,599,470	48.64
Liberation	Princess Blanding	23,107	0.70
Write-in		2,592	0.08
Total votes		3,288,327	100.00

Party political offices
Preceded by Tom Daschle; Dick Gephardt	Permanent Chair of the Democratic National Convention; 2000	Succeeded by Bill Richardson
Preceded by Ed Rendell as General Chair of the Democratic National Committee	Chair of the Democratic National Committee; 2001–2005	Succeeded by Howard Dean
Preceded by Joe Andrew as National Chair of the Democratic National Committee	Chair of the Democratic National Committee; 2001–2005	Succeeded by Howard Dean
Preceded by Creigh Deeds	Democratic nominee for Governor of Virginia; 2013	Succeeded by Ralph Northam
Preceded by Ralph Northam	Democratic nominee for Governor of Virginia; 2021	Succeeded by Abigail Spanberger
Political offices
Preceded by Bob McDonnell	Governor of Virginia; 2014–2018	Succeeded by Ralph Northam
Preceded by Gary Herbert	Chair of the National Governors Association; 2016–2017	Succeeded by Brian Sandoval
U.S. order of precedence (ceremonial)
Preceded by Bob McDonnell as Former Governor	Order of precedence of the United States	Succeeded by Ralph Northam as Former Governor
