= Clean Virginia =

American advocacy group

- Formation: 2018; 8 years ago
- Founder: Michael Bills
- Website: www.cleanvirginia.org

Clean Virginia is a 501(c)(4) non-profit organization founded in 2018, with an associated political action committee, Clean Virginia Fund. The group primarily supports Democratic Party candidates in Virginia and is notable for being one of the largest donors in Virginia politics.

== History ==
Clean Virginia was founded in 2018 by investor and Democratic megadonor Michael Bills. It was founded with the goal of curbing the political influence of Dominion Energy, Virginia's largest energy utility. It has a political action committee called the Clean Virginia Fund.

== Political activity ==
The organization's stated mission is to "advance clean government and clean energy by fighting utility monopoly corruption in Virginia politics". Clean Virginia only funds candidates who have not accepted money from Dominion Energy.

As of 2021, Clean Virginia had donated to around 40 out of 55 Democratic Virginia House of Delegates incumbents, according to a spokesman. In the 2023 Virginia legislative elections, Clean Virginia spent $11.8 million, almost all on Democratic campaigns. In the 2022–2023 Virginia campaign cycle, Michael Bills (almost all of whose donations went to Clean Virginia) and his wife Sonjia Smith together spent over $17 million.
