= Steve Descano =

American lawyer and politician

Commonwealth's Attorney for Fairfax County
- Incumbent
- Assumed office January 2020
- Preceded by: Ray Morrogh

Personal details
- Born: c. 1980–1981 (age 44–46)
- Party: Democratic
- Education: United States Military Academy (BS); Temple University (JD)
- Occupation: Attorney

Steve T. Descano (born 1980 or 1981) is an American attorney and politician serving as the Commonwealth's Attorney for Fairfax County, Virginia. First elected in 2019, he is associated with the movement of reform-oriented or progressive prosecutors that emerged in several jurisdictions across the United States during the late 2010s and early 2020s.

== Early life and career ==
Descano graduated from West Point and served as a U.S. Army Aviation Officer before receiving a Juris Doctor degree from Temple University. He was a federal prosecutor for the Department of Justice under Barack Obama for six years, specializing in complex financial crimes. Afterwards, he represented the NAACP on Fairfax County's Police Civilian Review Panel, and worked as general counsel and chief operating officer for behavior therapy analysis provider Paragon Autism Services.

== Commonwealth's Attorney ==
Descano ran for Commonwealth's Attorney in 2019 against incumbent Ray Morrogh on a platform of criminal justice reform, defeating Morrogh in the Democratic primary 51%–49%. He then defeated independent Jonathan Fahey in the general election and took office in January 2020. The Washington Post has described Descano among a group of Northern Virginia Democratic prosecutors first elected in 2019 on reform platforms that emphasized reducing incarceration, limiting the use of cash bail, and addressing some mental health and substance abuse issues outside the traditional criminal justice system. Other examples cited were Parisa Dehghani-Tafti in Arlington County and Buta Biberaj in Loudoun County.

In his first term, Descano implemented several criminal justice reforms, including ending routine requests for cash bail, expanding diversion programs and no longer prosecuting some offenses such as simple marijuana possession. He also launched an interactive dashboard to analyze prosecutors' decisions to detail or release defendants before trial, and created a team to enforce Virginia's red flag law.

In 2023, Descano won renomination in the Democratic primary against challenger Ed Nuttall by 10 percentage points and was reelected to a second term without opposition in the general election.

In 2025, Descano's office partnered with the Mid-Atlantic Innocence Project to establish a Conviction Integrity Unit to review claims of wrongful conviction. The initiative was described as only the second local conviction integrity program in Virginia. Descano stated that the program was intended to strengthen public confidence in the justice system by ensuring that wrongful convictions could be identified and corrected.

== Controversies ==
Descano has been the target of criticism from some law enforcement groups, watchdog organizations and families of crime victims in response to violent criminals receiving dismissed or reduced charges. He was the subject of two unsuccessful recall efforts.

=== Richard Kenneth Cox case ===
In June 2024, Tier III sex offender Richard Kenneth Cox was charged with indecent exposure after allegedly exposing himself at a Planet Fitness women's restroom in Fairfax County, though the charge was dismissed. Descano's office stated that county prosecutors were not involved due to it being a pro se misdemeanor case, and that a judge had dismissed it due to the complaint filer not showing up. Between September and December 2024, Arlington and Fairfax counties then reported that Cox had visited two schools and two recreation centers, and was charged with indecent exposure for actions at three of these locations. Virginia Attorney General Jason Miyares as well as Democratic state senator Dave Marsden criticized Descano for not prosecuting Cox when he was first arrested.

=== Killing of Stephanie Minter ===
In February 2026, a 41-year-old mother named Stephanie Minter was stabbed to death at a bus stop in Fairfax County. Abdul Jalloh, who had lived in the United States illegally since 2012 and had over 30 criminal charges including for violent acts, was charged for the crime. Descano's office was warned by local police about Jalloh's potential for violence before the murder, but was reported to have dropped multiple prior cases of his and agreed to allow Jalloh to remain unsupervised following a probation violation that could have led to incarceration.

Following the killing, in May 2026 the United States Department of Justice opened a civil rights investigation into Descano's office regarding allegations that he had improperly offered "sweetheart deals" to perpetrators who were illegal immigrants, based on his claim to "make charging and plea decisions that limit or avoid immigration consequences." Descano denied wrongdoing and defended his policies as "fair, legal, and [reflecting] the values of my community".

== Personal life ==
Descano's wife is named Ryanne and they have one daughter.
