= Parisa Dehghani-Tafti =

American lawyer and politician

Commonwealth's Attorney for Arlington County and Falls Church
- Incumbent
- Assumed office January 2020
- Preceded by: Theo Stamos

Personal details
- Born: c. 1973–1974 (age 52–53)
- Party: Democratic
- Education: University of California, Berkeley (BA); New York University (JD)
- Occupation: Attorney

Parisa Dehghani-Tafti (born 1973 or 1974) is an Iranian-American politician and lawyer serving as the Commonwealth's Attorney for Arlington County and Falls Church in Virginia.

== Early life and career ==
Dehghani-Tafti was born in Iran and immigrated to the United States as a child. She graduated from the University of California, Berkeley with a BA in Philosophy and Comparative Literature and received her law degree from New York University School of Law.

Dehghani-Tafti worked as an attorney with the Public Defender Service for the District of Columbia, and later became the legal director at the Mid-Atlantic Innocence Project nonprofit. She has also worked as a law professor.

== Commonwealth's Attorney ==
=== First term ===
Dehghani-Tafti ran against incumbent Theo Stamos in the 2019 Democratic Commonwealth's Attorney primary on a platform of criminal justice reform, with campaign pledges including ending cash bail and not prosecuting low-level marijuana offenses. During the campaign, Deghani-Tafti accused Stamos of failing to prosecute police brutality cases, pointing to a 2015 fatal shooting where an investigation determined the officer had acted in self-defense; the accusation was criticized by two Arlington County police organizations who demanded an apology. The race garnered national attention as part of a wave of reform prosecutors challenging long-time incumbents in Northern Virginia. On June 11, 2019, Dehghani-Tafti won the primary with 52% of the vote compared to 48% for Stamos. Dehghani-Tafti was subsequently elected unopposed in the general election.

During her first term, Dehghani-Tafti created a position to review old convictions, launched a restorative justice program, and created a behavioral health docket for people with mental illnesses or developmental disabilities. Her office also worked with nonprofits to create diversion programs aimed at reducing racial disparities. After Deghani-Tafti was blocked from dropping marijuana cases by county judges who requested specific, written explanations for each case, Deghani-Tafti petitioned the Virginia Supreme Court to find that the judges were encroaching on her prosecutorial discretion, but the case was rejected in December 2020 on procedural grounds.

In the second half of 2021, Dehghani-Tafti was the target of an unsuccessful recall effort by the Virginians for Safe Communities advocacy group, who accused her of leniency toward criminals. The group criticized incidents where Dehghani-Tafti's office had offered plea deals to a man who threw his dogs from a balcony to their deaths, and to a man who allegedly brought 50 pounds of marijuana to Ronald Reagan Washington National Airport. The group also attempted to recall fellow progressive prosecutors Steve Descano in Fairfax County and Buta Biberaj in Loudoun County.

Data in July 2022 showed that the overall number of felony indictments by Dehghani-Tafti's office had fallen compared to her predecessor, and that some types of crime had increased. Speaking to ARLnow, the Arlington County police union president stated officers generally approved of her office's pursuance of violent crime charges, but that they were concerned with the handling of nonviolent repeat criminals, and an increase in felony cases being downgraded to misdemeanors. Dehghani-Tafti conversely advocated for increased investment into diversion programs to reduce the crime rate.

=== Second term ===
In the 2023 Commonwealth's Attorney race, Dehghani-Tafti was challenged in the Democratic primary by career prosecutor Josh Katcher. Katcher also styled himself a reformer, claiming that he was more competent to deliver reform. On June 20, 2023, Dehghani-Tafti defeated Katcher by a 14-point margin. She was again unopposed in the general election.

In July 2026, Dehghani-Tafti was deposed by the United States House Committee on the Judiciary over her handling of a case where she declined to prosecute an activist who distributed leaflets with the home address of White House advisor Stephen Miller.

In September 2026, Dehgani-Tafti made the statement that Arlington County will not pursue DWI charges for DACA recipients. Dehghani-Tafti testified that her office's policy is to find a resolution or shift to a "lateral charge" so DACA recipients don't lose their status.
