= Members of the San Francisco Board of Supervisors =

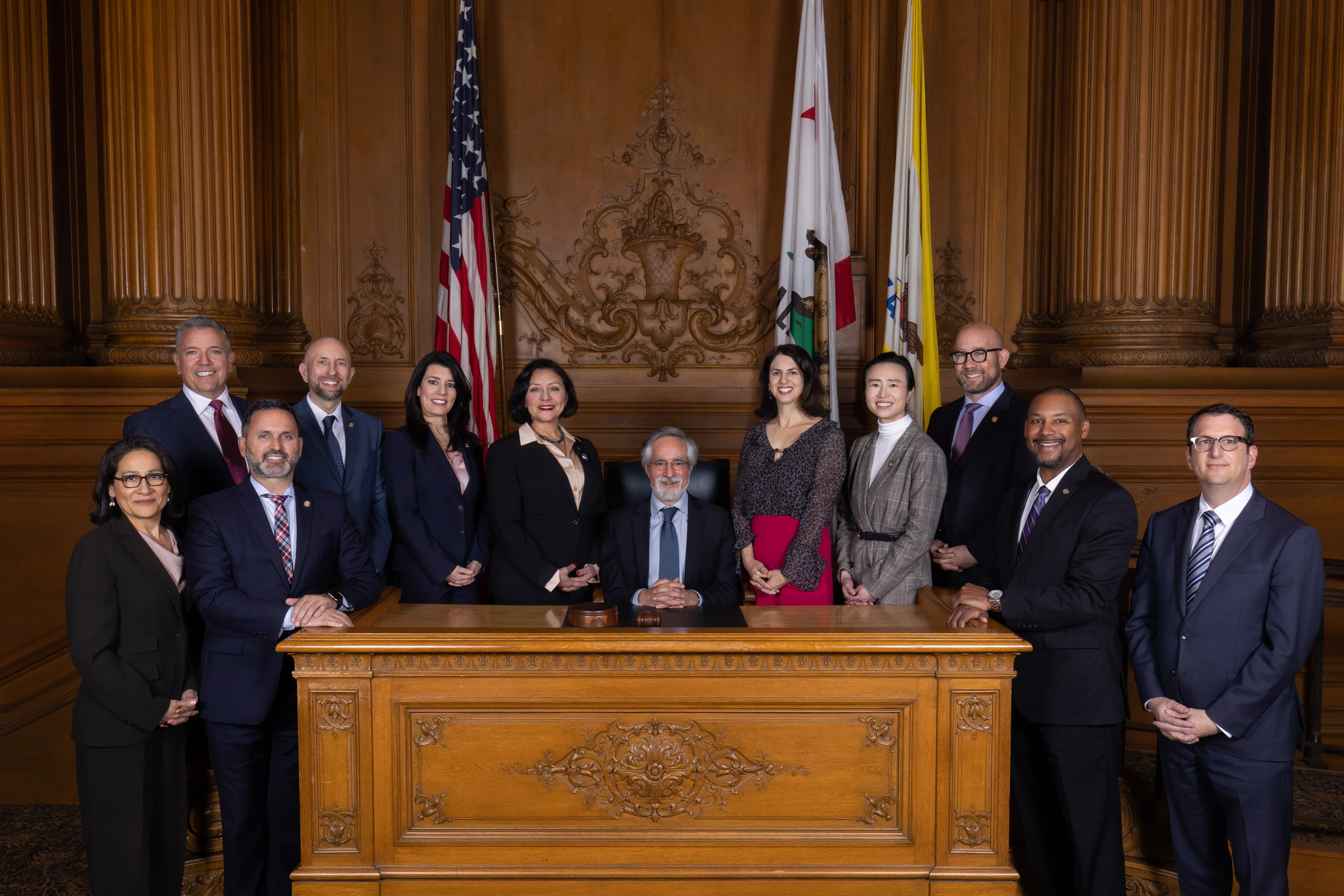
The Board of Supervisors as of March 2023 (official group photo)

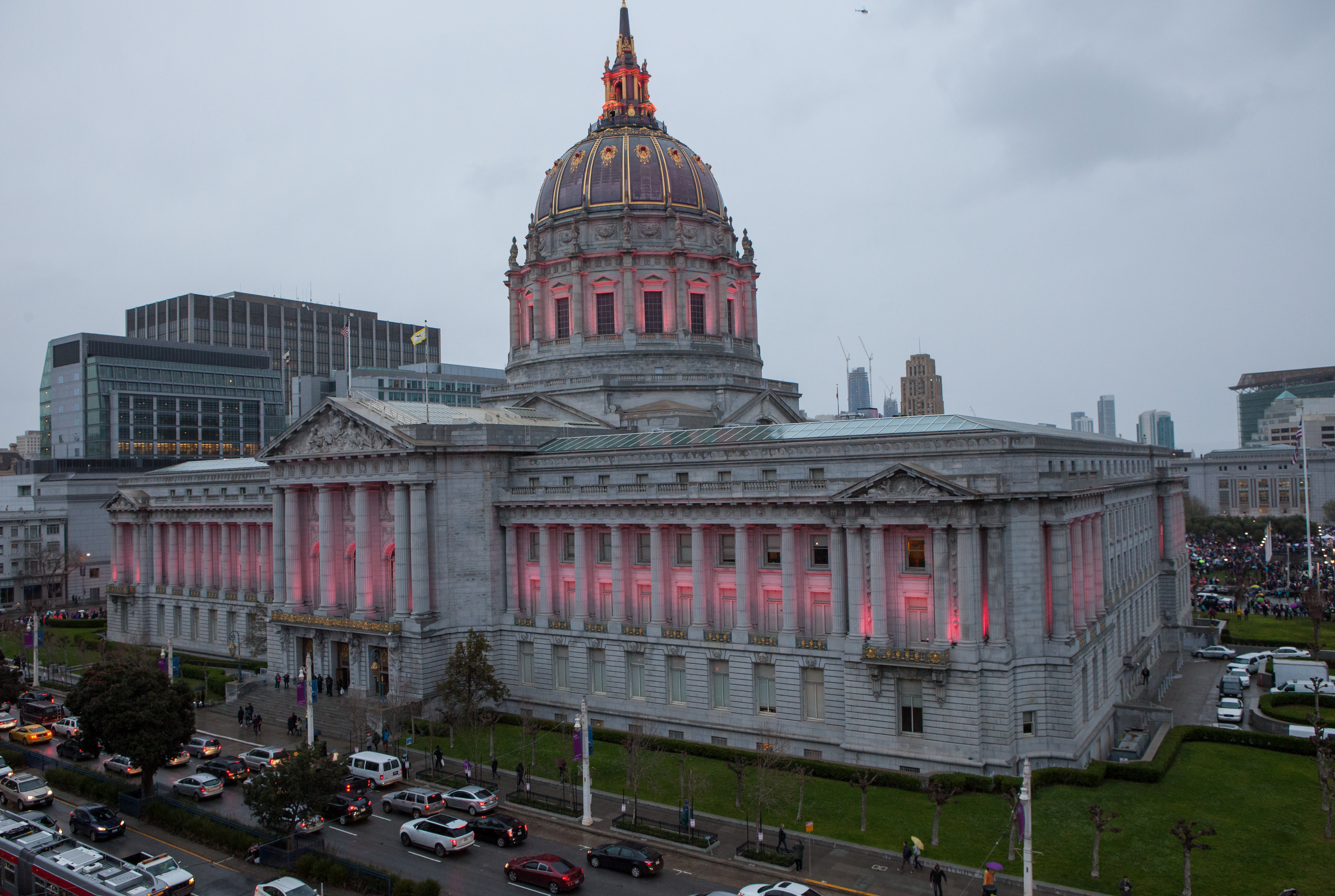
The Board of Supervisors meets in San Francisco City Hall.

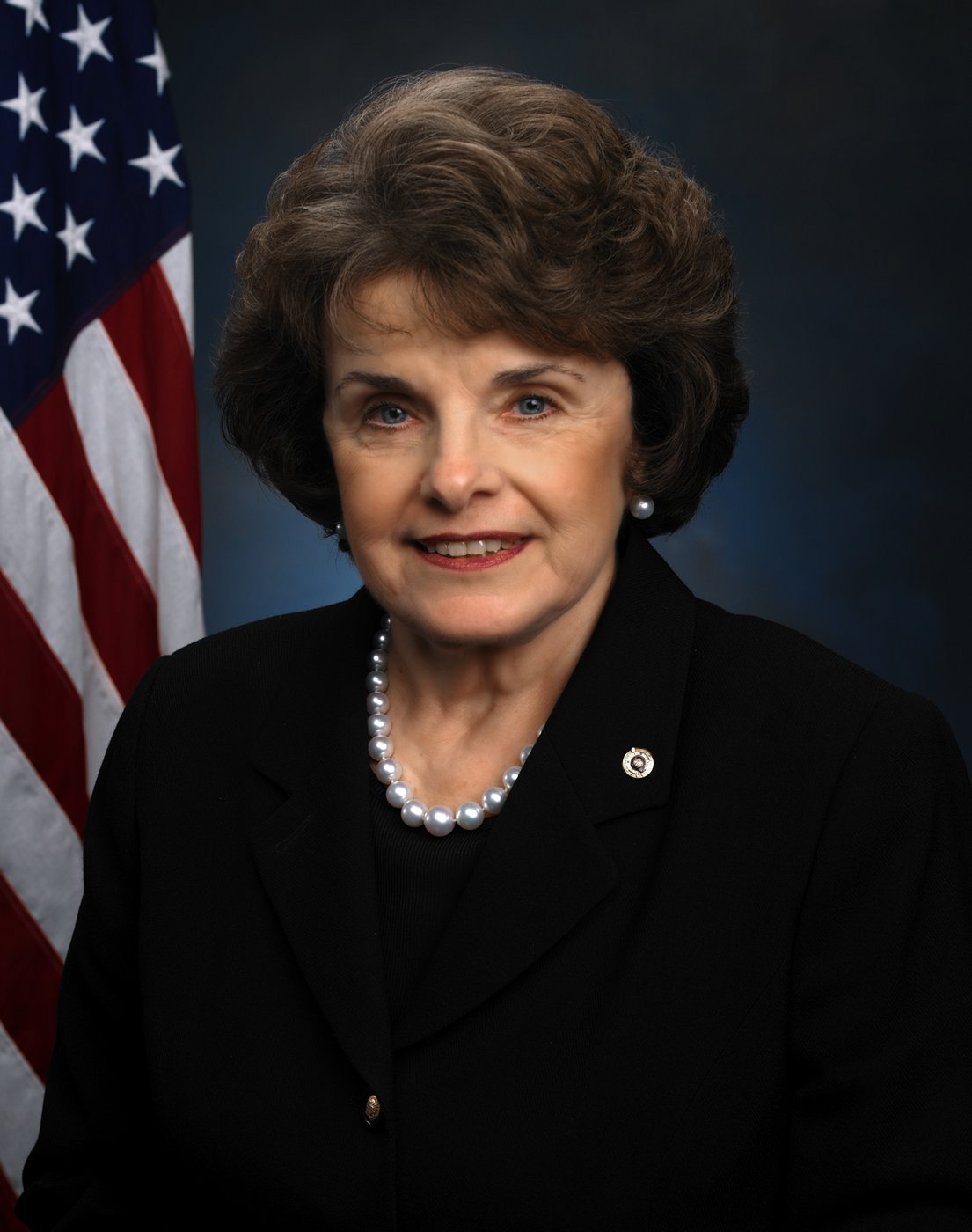
Former United States Senator Dianne Feinstein served as supervisor from 1970 to 1978 and as president in 1978.

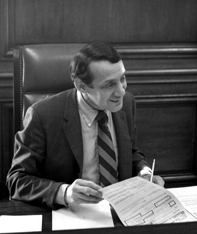
Harvey Milk, the first openly gay elected public official in California, served as supervisor in 1978.

The San Francisco Board of Supervisors is the legislative body of San Francisco, California, United States. The body consists of eleven members elected from single-member districts through ranked choice voting.

== Elections ==
From 1977 to 1979, and starting again in 2000, supervisors were elected from eleven single-member districts. Prior to 1977 and from 1980 to 1998, members were elected at-large, all running on one ballot, with the top vote-getters winning office. In 1980, elections shifted from odd-numbered years to even-numbered years, and because of the shift from district to at-large elections, all seats were up for election, with some members winning four-year terms and some winning two-year terms. Similar cases of supervisors elected to truncated terms happened in 1977 and 2000, when elections shifted to district elections.

Several members were initially appointed by the mayor. San Francisco's city charter gives the mayor the power to fill any vacancies and to suspend members in limited circumstances; the latter case has happened only once, when Mayor Gavin Newsom suspended Ed Jew due to allegations of lying about his residency and extortion. A few members were elected to the board, but appointed to their seat by the mayor during the weeks between the election and the beginning of their term. This has generally been done when supervisors were elected to the state legislature, since the terms of state legislators begin earlier than those of supervisors. The most recent example occurred in 2008, when David Campos was elected to the District 9 seat held by Tom Ammiano. In the same election, Ammiano was elected to the California State Assembly and resigned his seat a month early to take his new office. Mayor Gavin Newsom appointed Campos to the seat on December 4, 2008, a month before he would otherwise have taken office.

Supervisors are elected on non-partisan ballots, but in 2010, all current members of the Board of Supervisors were registered Democrats. Supervisor Jane Kim was previously a member of the Green Party, but switched her registration to Democratic before running for supervisor.

== Board presidents ==
The president of the Board of Supervisors presides over all board meetings and appoints members to board committees, among other duties. Board presidents are elected by their colleagues at the beginning of every odd-numbered year, or when a vacancy arises in the office. From 1983 to 2001, the city charter specified that the president would be the highest vote-getter in the previous election, taking the power of electing the board president away from the supervisors themselves, except in the case of a vacancy in the post.

== Board members ==
No official list of supervisors in office prior to 1906 exists as the 1906 San Francisco earthquake destroyed all Board of Supervisors records. However, the names of San Francisco supervisors are recorded in many documents and newspapers from the time.

=== San Francisco Common Council ===
The San Francisco Common Council was the predecessor of the San Francisco Board of Supervisors. The Common Council was made up of the Board of Aldermen and the Board of Assistant Aldermen, each composed of one member elected from each of the city's eight wards. The first elections to these posts took place on May 1, 1850 (the same day as the vote on the city charter), and the Common Council took office on May 6, 1850. The Common Council had authority only within the city limits, which stretched west to Divisadero and Castro streets and south to 20th Street.

The seventh and last Common Council served until July 1856, when under the Consolidation Act that unified city and county government in San Francisco, the Common Council was replaced by the first Board of Supervisors.

=== Four-member board (July–November 1856) ===
The first Board of Supervisors served only from July 8 to November 15, 1856, and consisted of one justice of the peace for each of the city's four districts. These four men chose George J. Whelan as the city's mayor and president of the board.

Year	President	District			
Year	President	1	2	3	4
July–November 1856	George J. Whelan	Lawrence Ryan	E.W. Smith	C.M. Chamberlain	David B. Castree

=== 12 members elected by district (1856–1899) ===
Supervisors from the 19th century are listed in surviving copies of municipal reports, contemporary newspapers, and similar sources.

Year	Ward											
Year	1	2	3	4	5	6	7	8	9	10	11	12
November 1856 – 1857	Charles Wilson	W.A. Darling	W.K. Van Alen	M.R. Roberts	Samuel Merritt	Charles W. Bond^{[A]}	H.A. George	N.C. Lane	W.L. Palmer	R.G. Sneath	J.J. Denny	S.S. Tilton
1858	Charles Wilson	W.A. Darling	W.K. Van Alen	L.B. Benchley	Samuel Merritt	Thomas Tennent^{[B]}	H.A. George	N.C. Lane	W.L. Palmer	R.G. Sneath	J.J. Denny	S.S. Tilton
1859	Charles S. Biden	W.A. Darling	H.S. Gates	L.B. Benchley	Thomas Young	Thomas Tennent^{[B]}	J.S. Paxson	N.C. Lane	W. McKibbin	R.G. Sneath	J.C. Corbett	S.S. Tilton
1860	Charles S. Biden	Joseph Britton	H.S. Gates	F.W. Brooks	Thomas Young	Thomas Tennent^{[B]}	J.S. Paxson	J.S. Davies	W.B. Johnson	James Otis^{[G]}	A.G. Randall^{[C]} John C. Ayres[D]	John Lynch^{[E]}
1861	Charles S. Biden	Joseph Britton	H. De La Montaya	F.W. Brooks	D. Gaven	H.L. Dodge	W.C. Hinckley	J.S. Davies	Eugene Crowell	James Otis^{[G]}	Frank McCoppin	John Lynch^{[E]}
1862	Charles S. Biden	Myles D. Sweeney	H. De La Montaya	H.L. King	D. Gaven	H.L. Dodge	W.C. Hinckley	Gerritt W. Bell	John C. Merrill	J.H. Redington^{[H]}	Frank McCoppin	James W. Cudworth^{[F]}
1863	A.H. Titcomb	Myles D. Sweeney	H. De La Montaya	H.L. King	D. Gaven	Giles H. Gray	W.C. Hinckley	Gerritt W. Bell	John C. Merrill	J.H. Redington^{[H]}	Frank McCoppin	James W. Cudworth^{[F]}
1864	A.H. Titcomb	John Fay	H. De La Montaya	H.L. King	E.C. Kennedy A.S. Baldwin	E.N. Torrey	W.C. Hinckley	Gerritt W. Bell	John C. Merrill	A.H. Cummings	Frank McCoppin	Michael Cody
1865	A.H. Titcomb	John Fay	Isaac Rowell	H.L. King	Monroe Ashbury	E.N. Torrey	Charles Clayton	Gerritt W. Bell	A.J. Shrader	A.H. Cummings	Frank McCoppin	Michael Cody
1866	A.H. Titcomb	R.P. Clement	Isaac Rowell	William S. Phelps	Monroe Ashbury	E.N. Torrey	Charles Clayton	Jacob Schreiber	A.J. Shrader	James H. Reynolds	Frank McCoppin	Charles H. Stanyan
1867	P.H. Daly	R.P. Clement	W.B. Farman	William S. Phelps	Monroe Ashbury	E.N. Torrey	Charles Clayton	F.G.E. Tittell	A.J. Shrader	James H. Reynolds	Frank McCoppin	Charles H. Stanyan
1868	Henry Winkle	John Harrold	Edward Flaherty	R. Beverly Cole	Monroe Ashbury	D.D. Shattuck	Charles Clayton	J.B.E. Cavallier	A.J. Shrader	Edward Nunan	P.H. Canavan	Charles H. Stanyan
1869	Henry Winkle	John Harrold	Edward Flaherty	R. Beverly Cole	Monroe Ashbury	D.D. Shattuck	Richard Ring	J.B.E. Cavallier	A.J. Shrader	Edward Nunan	P.H. Canavan	Charles H. Stanyan
1870	Henry Winkle	John Harrold	Edward Flaherty	Timothy McCarthy	Monroe Ashbury	Alexander Badlam	Richard Ring	Charles R. Story	A.J. Shrader	James Adams	P.H. Canavan	M.J. Kelly
1871	Stewart Menzies	John Harrold	James J. Kenney	Timothy McCarthy	Robert Goodwin	Alexander Badlam	A.B. Forbes	Charles R. Story	A.J. Shrader	James Adams	Edward Commins	M.J. Kelly
1872	Stewart Menzies	H.F. Swain	James J. Kenney	Timothy McCarthy	Robert Goodwin	Henry L. King	A.B. Forbes	Charles R. Story	A.J. Shrader	James Barrett	Edward Commins	Samuel Penfield Taylor
1873	Stewart Menzies	H.F. Swain	James J. Kenney	Timothy McCarthy	Robert Goodwin	Henry L. King	A.B. Forbes	Charles R. Story	A.J. Shrader	James Barrett	Edward Commins	Samuel Penfield Taylor
1874	Stewart Menzies	William C. Pease	James J. Kenney	A.M. Ebbets	John R. Sims	James H. Deering	James B. Roberts	A.L. Wangenheim	A.W. Scott	George Hewston	M. Lynch	D.A. Macdonald
1875	Stewart Menzies	William C. Pease	James J. Kenney	A.M. Ebbets	John R. Sims	James H. Deering	James B. Roberts	Abram Block	A.W. Scott	George Hewston	M. Lynch	D.A. Macdonald
1876	August Drucker	C.B. Edwards	Thomas Bryan	John H. Wise	John P. Shine	Frederick W. Eaton	George W. Hayes	Fleet F. Strother	Thomas Boyce	John C. Roberts	Frederick A. Gibbs	D.A. Macdonald
1877	August Drucker	C.B. Edwards	Thomas Bryan	John H. Wise	John P. Shine	Frederick W. Eaton	George W. Hayes	Fleet F. Strother	Thomas Boyce	John C. Roberts	Frederick A. Gibbs	D.A. Macdonald
1878	John Foley	Martin Mangels	Horace L. Hill	Edwin Danforth	J. Henley Smith	James O. Rountree	John W. Farren	Thomas S. Acheson	A.W. Scott	Robert Haight	Frederick A. Gibbs	Henry Brickwedel
1879	John Foley	Martin Mangels	Thomas A. Talbert	Edwin Danforth	J. Henley Smith	James O. Rountree	John W. Farren	Thomas S. Acheson	A.W. Scott	Robert Haight	Frederick A. Gibbs	Henry Brickwedel
1880	Antone Schottler	John Mason	J.M. Litchfield	Samuel Drake	James D. Whitney	Frank Eastman	Hugh Fraser	Charles L. Taylor	Micah Doane	Charles A. Bayly	Erastus N. Torrey	James B. Stetson
1881	Antone Schottler	John Mason	J.M. Litchfield	Samuel Drake	James D. Whitney	Frank Eastman	Hugh Fraser	Charles L. Taylor	Micah Doane	Charles A. Bayly	Erastus N. Torrey	James B. Stetson
1882	William H. Bodfish	John C. McKew	John Shirley	John H. Carmany	Henry Molineaux	George Torrens	George B. Bradford	Charles A. Fisher	Oliver Merrill	Henry B. Russ	Nathan C. Parrish	John F. Kennedy
1883	John T. Sullivan	John J. Reichenbach	John Shirley	Charles H. Burton	J. Henley Smith	Edward B. Pond	John D. Griffin	Fleet F. Strother	John B. Lewis	Herman Ranken	Jefferson G. James	Thomas Ashworth
1884	John T. Sullivan	John J. Reichenbach	John Shirley	Charles H. Burton	J. Henley Smith	Edward B. Pond	John D. Griffin	Fleet F. Strother	John B. Lewis	Herman Ranken	Jefferson G. James	Thomas Ashworth
1885	Justin Gates	Robert Roy	John E. Kunkler	John E. Abbott	Willard B. Farwell	Edward B. Pond	James Williamson	David L. Farnsworth	Albert Heyer	James Gilleran	Daniel McMillan	Samuel Valleau
1886	Justin Gates	Robert Roy	John E. Kunkler	John E. Abbott	Willard B. Farwell	Edward B. Pond	James Williamson	David L. Farnsworth	Albert Heyer	James Gilleran	Daniel McMillan	Samuel Valleau
1887	Hugh Curran	James M. McDonald	Colin M. Boyd	Joseph Pescia	Charles S. Bush	Aaron M. Burns	William Hawkins	Albert F. Knorp	Albert Heyer	William P. Lambert	Herman Joost	Sargent S. Morton
1888	Hugh Curran	James M. McDonald	Colin M. Boyd	Joseph Pescia	Charles S. Bush	Aaron M. Burns	William Hawkins		Albert Heyer	William P. Lambert	Herman Joost	Sargent S. Morton
1889	Henry Bingham	James M. McDonald	Colin M. Boyd	Joseph Pescia	Charles S. Bush	Levi R. Ellert	Peter Wheelan	Diedrich Becker	Henry Pilster	Vincent Kingwell	David Barry	Patrick Noble
1890	Henry Bingham	Selden S. Wright	Colin M. Boyd	Joseph Pescia	Charles S. Bush	Levi R. Ellert	Peter Wheelan	Diedrich Becker	Henry Pilster	Vincent Kingwell	David Barry	Patrick Noble
1891	Henry Evans	David B. Jackson	James W. Burling	John. B. Curtis	Washington Ayer	Levi R. Ellert	George A. Carnes	Patrick J. Coffee	Albert Heyer	Denis D. Hunt	Charles W. Taber	William Wilkinson
1892	Joseph A. Artigues	David B. Jackson	James W. Burling	John. B. Curtis	Washington Ayer	Levi R. Ellert	George A. Carnes	Patrick J. Coffee	Albert Heyer	Denis D. Hunt	Charles W. Taber	William Wilkinson
1893	Michael Goodwin	Daniel Rogers	William Montgomery James I. Stanton C.W. Nevin	Patrick J. Kennedy	Sands W. Forman	Christian Reis	James Ryan	Robert Day	Patrick F. Dundon	William M. Hinton	Jefferson G. James	James Denman
1894	Michael Goodwin	Daniel Rogers	William Montgomery James I. Stanton C.W. Nevin	Patrick J. Kennedy	Sands W. Forman	Christian Reis	James Ryan	Robert Day	Patrick F. Dundon	William M. Hinton	Jefferson G. James	James Denman
1895	Joseph King	Peter A. Scully	Charles E. Benjamin	Alphonse Hirsch	Joseph I. Dimond	Edward C. Hughes	Christopher Dunker	Charles L. Taylor	Alfred W. Morgenstern	Adolph B. Spreckels	John K.C. Hobbs	Edward L. Wagner
1896	Joseph King	Peter A. Scully	Charles E. Benjamin	Alphonse Hirsch	Joseph I. Dimond	Edward C. Hughes	Christopher Dunker	Charles L. Taylor	Alfred W. Morgenstern	Adolph B. Spreckels	John K.C. Hobbs	Edward L. Wagner
1897	Lawrence Devany	Thomas H. Haskins	P.M. Delany	John H. Sheehan	Washington Dodge	John Lackmann	T.A. Rottanzi	Thomas Morton	James E. Britt	Edward J. Smith	Charles A. Clinton	Thomas W. Rivers
1898	Lawrence Devany	Thomas H. Haskins	P.M. Delany	John H. Sheehan	Washington Dodge	John Lackmann	T.A. Rottanzi	Thomas Morton	James E. Britt	Edward J. Smith	Charles A. Clinton	Thomas W. Rivers
1899	Edward Holland	Edward C. Kalben	Howard Black	Edward L. Perrault	William H. Phelps	John Lackmann	Lewis F. Byington	George W. Collins	Albert Heyer	Jeremiah Deasy	Arthur Attridge	Edward H. Algeltinger
Year	1	2	3	4	5	6	7	8	9	10	11	12
Year	Ward											

- ^{A} Charles W. Bond resigned April 7, 1858.
- ^{B} Thomas Tennett took his seat May 21, 1858.
- ^{C} A.G. Randall resigned February 13, 1860.
- ^{D} John C. Ayres took his seat May 7, 1860.
- ^{E} John Lynch resigned October 7, 1861.
- ^{F} James W. Cudworth took his seat November 4, 1861.
- ^{G} James Otis resigned November 25, 1861, "as he is under the necessity of absenting himself from the State for the next few months".
- ^{H} J.H. Redington took his seat December 30, 1861.

=== 18 members elected at-large, serving two-year terms (1900–1911) ===
Article II, Chapter I, Section 2 of the revised charter, ratified by voters on May 26, 1898, specified that "[t]he Board of Supervisors shall consist of eighteen members all of whom shall hold office for two years and be elected from the City and County at large." Former mayors of the city were allowed non-voting seats on the board. In 1912, supervisors' terms were extended to four years.

Year																		
1900	James P. Booth	Charles Boxton^{[P]}	Henry U. Branden- stein	A. B. Maguire^{[A]}	A. Comte, Jr.	John Connor	Peter J. Curtis	A. Arnold D'Ancona	L.J. Dwyer^{[G]}	M.J. Fontana	Richard M. Hotaling	Thomas Jennings	William N. McCarthy	Charles Wesley Reed	George R. Sanderson	John E.A. Helms^{[C]}	Joseph S. Tobin	Victor D. Duboce^{[D]}
1901	James P. Booth	Charles Boxton^{[P]}	Henry U. Branden- stein	Samuel Braunhart^{[B]}	A. Comte, Jr.	John Connor	Peter J. Curtis	A. Arnold D'Ancona	L.J. Dwyer^{[G]}	M.J. Fontana	Richard M. Hotaling	Thomas Jennings	William N. McCarthy	Charles Wesley Reed	George R. Sanderson	Henry J. Stafford^{[E]}	Joseph S. Tobin	Horace Wilson^{[E]}
1902	James P. Booth	Charles Boxton^{[P]}	Henry U. Branden- stein	Samuel Braunhart^{[B]}	A. Comte, Jr.	John Connor	Peter J. Curtis	A. Arnold D'Ancona	Robert J. Loughery^{[H]}	George Alpers	Fred N. Bent	Frederick Eggers	John A. Lynch	George B. McClellan	George R. Sanderson	Henry Payot	William J. Wynn^{[I]}	Horace Wilson^{[E]}
1903	James P. Booth	Charles Boxton^{[P]}	Henry U. Branden- stein	Samuel Braunhart^{[B]}	A. Comte, Jr.	John Connor	Peter J. Curtis	A. Arnold D'Ancona	Robert J. Loughery^{[H]}	George Alpers	Fred N. Bent	Frederick Eggers	John A. Lynch	George B. McClellan	George R. Sanderson	Henry Payot	Edward I. Walsh^{[J]}	Horace Wilson^{[E]}
1904	James P. Booth	Charles Boxton^{[P]}	Henry U. Branden- stein	Samuel Braunhart^{[B]}	A. Comte, Jr.	John Connor	Thomas F. Finn^{[K]}	A. Arnold D'Ancona	Oscar Hocks	George Alpers	Fred N. Bent	Frederick Eggers	Theodore Lunstedt	George B. McClellan	L.A. Rea	Henry Payot	Edward R. Rock	William W. Sanderson
1905	James P. Booth	Charles Boxton^{[P]}	Henry U. Branden- stein	Samuel Braunhart^{[B]}	A. Comte, Jr.	John Connor	James L. Gallagher^{[L]}	A. Arnold D'Ancona	Oscar Hocks	George Alpers	Fred N. Bent	Frederick Eggers	Theodore Lunstedt	George B. McClellan	L.A. Rea	Henry Payot	Edward R. Rock	William W. Sanderson
1906	Michael W. Coffey	Charles Boxton^{[P]}	Daniel G. Coleman	Sam Davis	John J. Furey	Cornelius J. Harrigan	James L. Gallagher^{[L]}	James F. Kelly	Thomas F. Lonergan	Max Mamlock	Patrick M. McGushin	Fred P. Nicholas	Andrew M. Wilson^{[M]}	George F. Duffey^{[M]}	L.A. Rea	Jennings J. Phillips	Edward I. Walsh	William W. Sanderson
Jan–July 1907^{[O]}	Michael W. Coffey	Charles Boxton^{[P]}	Daniel G. Coleman	Sam Davis	John J. Furey	Cornelius J. Harrigan	James L. Gallagher^{[L]}	James F. Kelly	Thomas F. Lonergan	Max Mamlock	Patrick M. McGushin	Fred P. Nicholas	J.J. O'Neill^{[N]}	Olaf A. Tveitmoe^{[N]}	L.A. Rea	Jennings J. Phillips	Edward I. Walsh	William W. Sanderson
Aug–Dec 1907^{[Q]}	Henry U. Brandenstein	James P. Booth^{[O]}	Gustave Brenner	George L. Center	A. Arnold D'Ancona	Thomas Magee	Bernard Faymonville	Eusebius Joseph Molera	Charles Albert Murdock	Daniel C. Murphy	A. Comte, Jr.	Henry Payot	J.J. O'Neill^{[N]}	Olaf A. Tveitmoe^{[N]}	Lippmann Sachs^{[R]}	Loring P. Rixford^{[U]}	Matt Sullivan	William G. Stafford^{[R]}
1908	Paul Bancroft	James P. Booth^{[O]}	William Broderick	George L. Center	A.H. Giannini^{[T]}	Oscar Hocks	Thomas Jennings	James A. Johnston	Charles Albert Murdock	Daniel C. Murphy	A. Comte, Jr.	Henry Payot	M. Hall McAllister	Ralph McLeran	A. Arnold D'Ancona^{[S]}	Loring P. Rixford^{[U]}	Allan Pollok	George A. Connolly^{[S]}
1909	Paul Bancroft	James P. Booth^{[O]}	William Broderick	George L. Center	W. W. Sanderson^{[T]}	Oscar Hocks	Thomas Jennings	James A. Johnston	Charles Albert Murdock	Daniel C. Murphy	A. Comte, Jr.	Henry Payot	M. Hall McAllister	Ralph McLeran	A. Arnold D'Ancona^{[S]}	W.E. Balcom^{[U]}	Allan Pollok	George A. Connolly^{[S]}
1910	Paul Bancroft	Edward L. Cutten	Cornelius Deasy	Matt Harris, Sr.	James Emmet Hayden	Oscar Hocks	Timothy B. Healy	John L. Herget	Charles Albert Murdock	John A. Kelly	John R. Knowles	Robert J. Loughery	John P. McLaughlin	Timothy P. Minehan	Charles A. Nelson	Thomas P. O'Dowd	William C. Pugh	John O. Walsh
1911	Paul Bancroft	Edward L. Cutten	Cornelius Deasy	Matt Harris, Sr.	James Emmet Hayden	Oscar Hocks	Timothy B. Healy	John L. Herget	Charles Albert Murdock	John A. Kelly	John R. Knowles	Robert J. Loughery	John I. Nolan^{[V]}	Timothy P. Minehan	Charles A. Nelson	Thomas P. O'Dowd	William C. Pugh	John O. Walsh
Year	Board elections moved to staggered four-year terms from 1912																	

- ^{A} A.B. Maguire resigned some time before June 27, 1900, and died shortly afterwards.
- ^{B} Samuel Braunhart was appointed June 27, 1900 to replace A.B Maguire.
- ^{C} John E.A. Helms died some time before July 26, 1900, while returning from a trip to investigate the possibility of using Lake Tahoe as a water supply for the city.
- ^{D} Colonel Victor Donglain Duboce, a veteran of the Spanish–American War died some time before August 15, 1900.
- ^{E} Henry J. Stafford was appointed November 1, 1900 to replace John E.A. Helms.
- ^{F} Horace Wilson was appointed November 1, 1900 to replace Victor D. Duboce.
- ^{G} L.J. Dwyer died some time before February 8, 1902.
- ^{H} Robert J. Loughery was appointed February 8, 1902 to replace L.J. Dwyer.
- ^{I} William J. Wynn resigned after his election as U.S. Representative for California's 5th congressional district for the term beginning March 4, 1903.
- ^{J} Edward I. Walsh was appointed March 4, 1903 to replace W.J. Wynn.
- ^{K} Thomas F. Finn resigned January 31, 1905.
- ^{L} James L. Gallagher was appointed February 11, 1905 to replace Thomas F. Finn. On June 17, 1907, Gallagher was appointed acting mayor by the board of supervisors, to serve in place of Eugene E. Schmitz, who had been arrested on felony charges of extortion. Schmitz protested his removal, but Gallagher continued to serve until the board elected Charles Boxton to fill Schmitz's unexpired term on July 9, 1907.
- ^{M} A.M. Wilson and G.F. Duffey resigned their positions prior to January 17, 1907; Wilson took up the position of state railroad commissioner; Duffey became director of the city's department of public works.
- ^{N} J.J. O'Neill and O.A. Tveitmoe were appointed by Mayor Eugene E. Schmitz on January 17, 1907, to succeed A.M. Wilson and G.F. Duffey, who had resigned.
- ^{O} On March 18, 1907, as part of the San Francisco graft trials, 16 of the 18 supervisors confessed before a grand jury to receiving money from corrupt political boss Abe Ruef. In exchange for their testimony, "they were promised complete immunity and would not be forced to resign their offices."
- ^{P} Following the conviction of Mayor Eugene E. Schmitz for extortion, the board declared the office of the mayor vacant on July 9, 1907. Charles Boxton resigned his position as supervisor the same day and was elected by the board to fill Schmitz's unexpired term. However, testimony in Schmitz's corruption trial soon revealed that Boxton had taken bribes, so he actually served only seven days as mayor, resigning on July 16, 1907, to be replaced by Edward R. Taylor, dean of Hastings College of the Law. On July 29, 1907, Taylor appointed James P. Booth, who had served as a supervisor from 1900 to 1905, to serve Boxton's unexpired term as supervisor.
- ^{Q} On July 29, 1907, two weeks after Edward R. Taylor's appointment as mayor, he conducted a wholesale purge of supervisors connected with the graft scandal. Taylor obtained the resignations of 14 supervisors and appointed replacements for all their seats plus the open seat created by the resignation of Charles Boxton. These 15 appointments were protested by supervisors O.A. Tveitmoe and J.J. O'Neill, who had not resigned, on the grounds that Taylor's claim to the mayor's office had not been legally established. On August 26, 1907, P.M. McGushin resigned and Taylor replaced him with former supervisor A. Comte, Jr.
- ^{R} Lippmann Sachs and W.G. Stafford were both elected in November 1907 to continue as supervisors. However, both resigned before May 28, 1908.
- ^{S} George A. Connolly and A.A. D'Ancona were appointed as supervisors on May 28, 1908, to replace W.G. Stafford and Lippmann Sachs, respectively.
- ^{T} W. W. Sanderson was appointed June 1, 1909 to replace A.H. Giannini, who had resigned. Attilio Henry Giannini was the brother of A.P. Giannini, founder of the Bank of America. W. W. Sanderson was an attorney and newspaperman. He was unrelated to William W. Sanderson, the supervisor who served during the period of Abe Ruef's corruption and gave evidence about the graft schemes.
- ^{U} W.E. Balcom was appointed June 7, 1909 to replace L.P. Rixford, who had resigned.
- ^{V} John I. Nolan was appointed March 6, 1911 to replace John P. McLaughlin, who had resigned.

=== 18 members elected at-large, serving staggered four-year terms (1912–1931) ===
From January 8, 1912, the term of office of San Francisco supervisors was extended to four years, with nine members elected every two years. The nine supervisors with the highest vote counts at the 1911 election received four-year terms, and the other nine received two-year initial terms putting them up for re-election in 1913.

Year	Initial term 1912–1915									Initial term 1912–1913								
1912	Paul Bancroft^{[A]}	George E. Gallagher^{[C]}	James Emmet Hayden^{[A]}	Oscar Hocks^{[A]}	Thomas Jennings	William H. McCarthy	Charles Albert Murdock^{[A]}	Henry Payot	Alexander T. Vogelsang	Guido E. Caglieri	Andrew J. Gallagher	J.B. Bocarde, A.H. Giannini^{[B]}	Fred L. Hilmer	Adolf Koshland	Byron Mauzy	Ralph McLeran	Daniel C. Murphy	Edward L. Nolan
1913	Paul Bancroft^{[A]}	George E. Gallagher^{[C]}	James Emmet Hayden^{[A]}	Oscar Hocks^{[A]}	Thomas Jennings	William H. McCarthy	Charles Albert Murdock^{[A]}	Henry Payot	Alexander T. Vogelsang	Guido E. Caglieri	Andrew J. Gallagher	J.B. Bocarde, A.H. Giannini^{[B]}	Fred L. Hilmer	Adolf Koshland	Byron Mauzy	Ralph McLeran	Daniel C. Murphy	Edward L. Nolan
1914	Paul Bancroft^{[A]}	John C. Kortick^{[C]}	James Emmet Hayden^{[A]}	Oscar Hocks^{[A]}	Thomas Jennings	William H. McCarthy	Charles Albert Murdock^{[A]}	Henry Payot	Alexander T. Vogelsang	Cornelius J. Deasy	Andrew J. Gallagher	Charles A. Nelson	Fred L. Hilmer	James E. Power	Fred Suhr, Jr.	Ralph McLeran	John O. Walsh	Edward L. Nolan
1915	Paul Bancroft^{[A]}	John C. Kortick^{[C]}	James Emmet Hayden^{[A]}	Oscar Hocks^{[A]}	Thomas Jennings	William H. McCarthy	Charles Albert Murdock^{[A]}	Henry Payot	Alexander T. Vogelsang	Cornelius J. Deasy	Andrew J. Gallagher	Charles A. Nelson	Fred L. Hilmer	James E. Power	Fred Suhr, Jr.	Ralph McLeran	John O. Walsh	Edward L. Nolan
1916	Edward J. Brandon	John C. Kortick^{[C]}	James Emmet Hayden^{[A]}	Oscar Hocks^{[A]}	John D. Hynes	Joseph F. Lahaney	Joseph Mulvihill	Richard J. Welch	Edward I. Wolfe^{[D]}	Cornelius J. Deasy	Andrew J. Gallagher	Charles A. Nelson	Fred L. Hilmer	James E. Power	Fred Suhr, Jr.	Ralph McLeran	John O. Walsh	Edward L. Nolan
1917	Edward J. Brandon	John C. Kortick^{[C]}	James Emmet Hayden^{[A]}	Oscar Hocks^{[A]}	John D. Hynes	Joseph F. Lahaney	Joseph Mulvihill	Richard J. Welch	Edward I. Wolfe^{[D]}	Cornelius J. Deasy	Andrew J. Gallagher	Charles A. Nelson	Fred L. Hilmer	James E. Power	Fred Suhr, Jr.	Ralph McLeran	John O. Walsh	Edward L. Nolan
1918^{[E]}	Edward J. Brandon	John C. Kortick^{[C]}	James Emmet Hayden^{[A]}	Oscar Hocks^{[A]}	John D. Hynes	Joseph F. Lahaney	Joseph Mulvihill	Richard J. Welch	Edward I. Wolfe^{[D]}	Cornelius J. Deasy	Andrew J. Gallagher	Charles A. Nelson	Fred L. Hilmer	James E. Power	Fred Suhr, Jr.	Ralph McLeran	James B. McSheehy	Eugene Schmitz
1919	Edward J. Brandon	John C. Kortick^{[C]}	James Emmet Hayden^{[A]}	Oscar Hocks^{[A]}	John D. Hynes	Joseph F. Lahaney	Joseph Mulvihill	Richard J. Welch	Edward I. Wolfe^{[D]}	Cornelius J. Deasy	Andrew J. Gallagher	Charles A. Nelson	Fred L. Hilmer	James E. Power	Fred Suhr, Jr.	Ralph McLeran	James B. McSheehy	Eugene Schmitz
1920	Edwin G. Bath	Charles J. Powers	James Emmet Hayden^{[A]}	William S. Scott	John D. Hynes	Warren Shannon	Joseph Mulvihill	Richard J. Welch	Edward I. Wolfe^{[D]}	Cornelius J. Deasy	Andrew J. Gallagher	Charles A. Nelson	Fred L. Hilmer	James E. Power	Fred Suhr, Jr.	Ralph McLeran	James B. McSheehy	Eugene Schmitz
1921	Edwin G. Bath	Charles J. Powers	James Emmet Hayden^{[A]}	William S. Scott	John D. Hynes	Warren Shannon	Joseph Mulvihill	Richard J. Welch	Edward I. Wolfe^{[D]}	Cornelius J. Deasy	Andrew J. Gallagher	Charles A. Nelson	Fred L. Hilmer	James E. Power	Fred Suhr, Jr.	Ralph McLeran	James B. McSheehy	Eugene Schmitz
1922	Edwin G. Bath	Charles J. Powers	James Emmet Hayden^{[A]}	William S. Scott	John D. Hynes	Warren Shannon	Joseph Mulvihill	Richard J. Welch	Jesse C. Colman ^{[D]}	Cornelius J. Deasy	Frank H. Harris	John A. McGregor	Margaret Mary Morgan^{[F]}	Frank Robb	Angelo Joseph Rossi	Ralph McLeran	James B. McSheehy	Eugene Schmitz
1923	Edwin G. Bath	Charles J. Powers	James Emmet Hayden^{[A]}	William S. Scott	John D. Hynes	Warren Shannon	Joseph Mulvihill	Richard J. Welch	Jesse C. Colman ^{[D]}	Cornelius J. Deasy	Frank H. Harris	John A. McGregor	Margaret Mary Morgan^{[F]}	Frank Robb	Angelo Joseph Rossi	Ralph McLeran	James B. McSheehy	Eugene Schmitz
1924	Edwin G. Bath	John Badaracco	James Emmet Hayden^{[A]}	William H. Harrelson	Philip C. Katz	Warren Shannon	Alfred Roncovieri	Richard J. Welch	Jesse C. Colman ^{[D]}	Cornelius J. Deasy	Frank H. Harris	John A. McGregor	Margaret Mary Morgan^{[F]}	Frank Robb	Angelo Joseph Rossi	Ralph McLeran	James B. McSheehy	Eugene Schmitz
1925	Edwin G. Bath	John Badaracco	James Emmet Hayden^{[A]}	William H. Harrelson	Philip C. Katz	Warren Shannon	Alfred Roncovieri	Richard J. Welch	Jesse C. Colman ^{[D]}	Cornelius J. Deasy	Frank H. Harris	John A. McGregor	Margaret Mary Morgan^{[F]}	Frank Robb	Angelo Joseph Rossi	Ralph McLeran	James B. McSheehy	Eugene Schmitz
1926	Edwin G. Bath	John Badaracco	James Emmet Hayden^{[A]}	William H. Harrelson	Philip C. Katz	Warren Shannon	Alfred Roncovieri	Richard J. Welch	Jesse C. Colman ^{[D]}	Cornelius J. Deasy	Franck R. Havenner	Milo F. Kent	Milton Marks, Sr.^{[G]}	Charles J. Powers	Walter J. Schmidt	William P. Stanton	James B. McSheehy	Charles F. Todd
1927	Edwin G. Bath	John Badaracco	James Emmet Hayden^{[A]}	William H. Harrelson	Philip C. Katz	Warren Shannon	Alfred Roncovieri	Richard J. Welch	Jesse C. Colman ^{[D]}	Cornelius J. Deasy	Franck R. Havenner	Milo F. Kent	Milton Marks, Sr.^{[G]}	Charles J. Powers	Walter J. Schmidt	William P. Stanton	James B. McSheehy	Charles F. Todd
1928	Andrew J. Gallagher	John Badaracco	James Emmet Hayden^{[A]}	Fred Suhr, Jr.	Joseph M. Toner^{[H]}	Warren Shannon	Alfred Roncovieri	Frank J. McGovern	Jesse C. Colman ^{[D]}	Cornelius J. Deasy	Franck R. Havenner	Milo F. Kent	Milton Marks, Sr.^{[G]}	Charles J. Powers	Walter J. Schmidt	William P. Stanton	James B. McSheehy	Charles F. Todd
1929	Andrew J. Gallagher	John Badaracco	James Emmet Hayden^{[A]}	Fred Suhr, Jr.	Joseph M. Toner^{[H]}	Warren Shannon	Alfred Roncovieri	Frank J. McGovern	Jesse C. Colman ^{[D]}	Cornelius J. Deasy	Franck R. Havenner	Milo F. Kent	Milton Marks, Sr.^{[G]}	Charles J. Powers	Walter J. Schmidt	William P. Stanton	James B. McSheehy	Charles F. Todd
1930	Andrew J. Gallagher	John Badaracco	James Emmet Hayden^{[A]}	Fred Suhr, Jr.	Joseph M. Toner^{[H]}	Warren Shannon	Alfred Roncovieri	Frank J. McGovern	Jesse C. Colman ^{[D]}	Victor J. Canepa	Franck R. Havenner	Carl W. Miles	Jefferson E. Peyser	James E. Power	Angelo Joseph Rossi^{[H]}	William P. Stanton	James B. McSheehy	E.J. "Jack" Spaulding
1931	Andrew J. Gallagher	John Badaracco	James Emmet Hayden^{[A]}	Fred Suhr, Jr.	Samuel T. Breyer^{[H]}^{[I]}	Warren Shannon	Alfred Roncovieri	Frank J. McGovern	Jesse C. Colman ^{[D]}	Victor J. Canepa	Franck R. Havenner	Carl W. Miles	Jefferson E. Peyser	James E. Power	Thomas P. Garrity^{[H]}	William P. Stanton	James B. McSheehy	E.J. "Jack" Spaulding
Year	Board reduced from 18 members to 15 for the period 1932–1933																	

- ^{A} Four members elected to four-year seats in 1912 served on the previous board: Paul Bancroft, James Emmet Hayden, Oscar Hocks and Charles Albert Murdock.
- ^{B} A.H. Giannini was appointed January 8, 1912 to replace J.B. Bocarde who was elected in November 1911 but died before his term started.
- ^{C} John C. Kortick was appointed March 9, 1914 to replace George E. Gallagher who resigned January 8, 1914.
- ^{D} Edward I. "Eddie" Wolfe collapsed and died while speaking at a luncheon on January 26, 1922. The next day Mayor James Rolph appointed Jesse C. Colman to the vacant seat.
- ^{E} The November 6, 1917 election used a preferential system for the supervisor race, apparently using the Bucklin voting system. Voters cast ballots for first, second and third choices for nine supervisor positions, choosing among 49 candidates. The total votes cast were divided by the nine seats to calculate a majority threshold. Ralph McLeran got most votes and was elected based on first preference votes only; Charles Nelson was elected based on first and second preference votes; the other seven successful candidates required first, second and third preference votes.
- ^{F} Margaret Mary Morgan was the first woman elected as a San Francisco supervisor. She placed seventh of 22 candidates for the nine seats at stake in the November 8, 1921 election.
- ^{G} Milton Marks, Sr. was the father of Milton Marks, Jr. who became the state assembly member and later state senator representing San Francisco. Milton Marks, Sr. did not stand for re-election in November 1929.
- ^{H} A.J. Rossi was sworn in as mayor of San Francisco on January 7, 1931, to fill the vacancy left by the swearing in of James Rolph as governor of California the previous day. Rossi had been chosen for the post on January 5 by a 14–2 vote of the Board of Supervisors. At the same time Dr. Joseph M. Toner took up a position as director of institutions for California. On January 20, Rossi's appointees Samuel T. Breyer and Thomas P. Garrity were sworn in to fill the two open supervisor seats.
- ^{I} Samuel T. Breyer was the father of Irving Breyer, who later served as legal counsel for the San Francisco Board of Education, and the grandfather of U.S. Supreme Court Justice Stephen Breyer and U.S. District Judge Charles Breyer.

=== 15 members elected at-large (1932–1933) ===
The new city charter adopted by voters in November 1931 reduced the Board of Supervisors' membership in two stages from 18 members to 11. The first stage was that the nine members whose terms expired at the end of 1931 were replaced by six new members elected in November 1931. This reduced the board to 15 members for the period 1932–1933. Then, at the 1933 election, only five supervisors were elected, reducing the board to 11 members. The 1931 charter also removed administrative responsibility from the board and restricted it to a legislative role, and it created a new position of President of the Board of Supervisors. Previously, the mayor had served as president of the board.

Year															
1932	Samuel T. Breyer	Arthur M. Brown, Jr.	Victor Canepa	Jesse Colman	Andrew J. Gallagher	Franck R. Havenner	J. Emmet Hayden	James McSheehy	Carl W. Miles	Jefferson E. Peyser	James E. Power	Warren Shannon	Alfred Roncovieri	E. Jack Spaulding	William P. Stanton
1933	Samuel T. Breyer	Arthur M. Brown, Jr.	Victor Canepa	Jesse Colman	Andrew J. Gallagher	Franck R. Havenner	J. Emmet Hayden	James McSheehy	Carl W. Miles	Jefferson E. Peyser	James E. Power	Warren Shannon	Alfred Roncovieri	E. Jack Spaulding	William P. Stanton
Year															

=== 11 members elected at-large (1934–1977) ===
Year											
1934	Jesse Colman	Franck R. Havenner	Andrew J. Gallagher	James McSheehy	John Ratto	Samuel T. Breyer	Arthur M. Brown, Jr.	Adolph Schmidt	Adolph Uhl	Alfred Roncovieri	Warren Shannon
1935	Jesse Colman	Franck R. Havenner	Andrew J. Gallagher	James McSheehy	John Ratto	J. Emmet Hayden	Arthur M. Brown, Jr.	Adolph Schmidt	Adolph Uhl	Alfred Roncovieri	Warren Shannon
1936	Jesse Colman	Franck R. Havenner	Dewey Mead	James McSheehy	John Ratto	Fred W. Meyer	Arthur M. Brown, Jr.	Adolph Schmidt	Adolph Uhl	Alfred Roncovieri	Warren Shannon
1937	Jesse Colman	George R. Reilly	Dewey Mead	James McSheehy	John Ratto	Fred W. Meyer	Arthur M. Brown, Jr.	Adolph Schmidt	Adolph Uhl	Alfred Roncovieri	Warren Shannon
1938	Jesse Colman	George R. Reilly	Dewey Mead	James McSheehy	John Ratto	Fred W. Meyer	Arthur M. Brown, Jr.	Adolph Schmidt	Adolph Uhl	Alfred Roncovieri	Warren Shannon
1939	Jesse Colman	John F. McGowan	Dewey Mead	James McSheehy	John Ratto	Fred W. Meyer	Arthur M. Brown, Jr.	Adolph Schmidt	Adolph Uhl	Alfred Roncovieri	Warren Shannon
1940	Jesse Colman	John F. McGowan	Dewey Mead	James McSheehy	John Ratto	Fred W. Meyer	Arthur M. Brown, Jr.	Adolph Schmidt	Adolph Uhl	Alfred Roncovieri	Warren Shannon
1941	Jesse Colman	John F. McGowan	Dewey Mead	James McSheehy	John Ratto	Fred W. Meyer	Arthur M. Brown, Jr.	Adolph Schmidt	Adolph Uhl	Alfred Roncovieri	Warren Shannon
1942	Jesse Colman	Gerald O'Gara	Dewey Mead	Chester MacPhee	Robert M. Green	Fred W. Meyer	Arthur M. Brown, Jr.	Daniel Gallagher	Adolph Uhl	Alfred Roncovieri	Warren Shannon
1943	Jesse Colman	James Gartland	Dewey Mead	Chester MacPhee	Robert M. Green	Fred W. Meyer	Arthur M. Brown, Jr.	Daniel Gallagher	Adolph Uhl	Alfred Roncovieri	Warren Shannon
1944	Jesse Colman	James Gartland	Dewey Mead	Chester MacPhee	Robert M. Green	Fred W. Meyer	Arthur M. Brown, Jr.	Daniel Gallagher	Adolph Uhl	Edward Mancuso	John J. Sullivan
1945	Jesse Colman	James Gartland	Dewey Mead	Chester MacPhee	Robert M. Green	Fred W. Meyer	Arthur M. Brown, Jr.	Daniel Gallagher	Adolph Uhl	Edward Mancuso	John J. Sullivan
1946	Jesse Colman	Marvin E. Lewis	Dewey Mead	Chester MacPhee	P. J. McMurray	Fred W. Meyer	Arthur M. Brown, Jr.	Daniel Gallagher	George Christopher	Edward Mancuso	John J. Sullivan
1947	Jesse Colman	Marvin E. Lewis	Dewey Mead	Chester MacPhee	P. J. McMurray	Fred W. Meyer	J. Joseph Sullivan	Daniel Gallagher	George Christopher	Edward Mancuso	John J. Sullivan
1948	Chris J. Christensen	Marvin E. Lewis	Dewey Mead	Chester MacPhee	P. J. McMurray	Don Fazackerley	J. Joseph Sullivan	Daniel Gallagher	George Christopher	Edward Mancuso	John J. Sullivan
1949	James Halley	Marvin E. Lewis	Dewey Mead	Chester MacPhee	P. J. McMurray	Don Fazackerley	J. Joseph Sullivan	Daniel Gallagher	George Christopher	Edward Mancuso	John J. Sullivan
1950	James Halley	Marvin E. Lewis	Dewey Mead	Chester MacPhee	P. J. McMurray	Don Fazackerley	J. Joseph Sullivan	Daniel Gallagher	George Christopher	Edward Mancuso	John J. Sullivan
1951	James Halley	Marvin E. Lewis	Dewey Mead	Chester MacPhee	P. J. McMurray	Don Fazackerley	J. Joseph Sullivan	Daniel Gallagher	George Christopher	Edward Mancuso	John J. Sullivan
1952	Byron Arnold	Marvin E. Lewis	Dewey Mead	Chester MacPhee	P. J. McMurray	John J. Ferdon	Harold Dobbs	Francis McCarty	George Christopher	Edward Mancuso	John J. Sullivan
1953	Byron Arnold	Marvin E. Lewis	Dewey Mead	Chester MacPhee	James Halley	John J. Ferdon	Harold Dobbs	Francis McCarty	George Christopher	Edward Mancuso	John J. Sullivan
1954	Byron Arnold	Marvin E. Lewis	Dewey Mead	J. Eugene McAteer	Matthew Carberry	John J. Ferdon	Harold Dobbs	Francis McCarty	George Christopher	Edward Mancuso	Clarissa McMahon
1955	Byron Arnold	William C. Blake	Charles Ertola	J. Eugene McAteer	Matthew Carberry	John J. Ferdon	Harold Dobbs	Francis McCarty	George Christopher	James Halley	Clarissa McMahon
1956	Joseph M. Casey	William C. Blake	Charles Ertola	J. Eugene McAteer	James J. Sullivan	John J. Ferdon	Harold Dobbs	Francis McCarty	Henry Rolph	James Halley	Clarissa McMahon
1957	Joseph M. Casey	William C. Blake	Charles Ertola	J. Eugene McAteer	James J. Sullivan	John J. Ferdon	Harold Dobbs	Francis McCarty	Henry Rolph	James Halley	Clarissa McMahon
1958	Joseph M. Casey	William C. Blake	Charles Ertola	Alfonso Zirpoli	James J. Sullivan	John J. Ferdon	Harold Dobbs	Francis McCarty	Henry Rolph	James Halley	Clarissa McMahon
1959	Joseph M. Casey	William C. Blake	Charles Ertola	Alfonso Zirpoli	James J. Sullivan	John J. Ferdon	Harold Dobbs	J. Joseph Sullivan	Henry Rolph	James Halley	Clarissa McMahon
1960	Joseph M. Casey	William C. Blake	Charles Ertola	Alfonso Zirpoli	James J. Sullivan	John J. Ferdon	Harold Dobbs	J. Joseph Sullivan	Henry Rolph	James Halley	Clarissa McMahon
1961	Joseph M. Casey	William C. Blake	Charles Ertola	Jesse Colman	Joseph E. Tinney	John J. Ferdon	Harold Dobbs	J. Joseph Sullivan	Peter Tamaras	James Halley	Clarissa McMahon
1962	Joseph M. Casey	William C. Blake	Charles Ertola	Jack Morrison	Joseph E. Tinney	John J. Ferdon	Harold Dobbs	Roger Boas	Peter Tamaras	James Halley	Clarissa McMahon
1963	Joseph M. Casey	William C. Blake	Charles Ertola	Jack Morrison	Joseph E. Tinney	John J. Ferdon	Harold Dobbs	Roger Boas	Peter Tamaras	J. Max Moore	Clarissa McMahon
1964	Joseph M. Casey	William C. Blake	Charles Ertola	Jack Morrison	Joseph E. Tinney	John J. Ferdon	Leo T. McCarthy	Roger Boas	Peter Tamaras	George Moscone	Clarissa McMahon
1965	Joseph M. Casey	William C. Blake	John Ertola	Jack Morrison	Joseph E. Tinney	Terry Francois	Leo T. McCarthy	Roger Boas	Peter Tamaras	George Moscone	Clarissa McMahon
1966	Joseph M. Casey	William C. Blake	John Ertola	Jack Morrison	Joseph E. Tinney	Terry Francois	Leo T. McCarthy	Roger Boas	Peter Tamaras	George Moscone	Kevin O'Shea
1967	Joseph M. Casey	William C. Blake	John Ertola	Jack Morrison	Dorothy von Beroldingen	Terry Francois	Leo T. McCarthy	Roger Boas	Peter Tamaras	Josiah H. "Joe" Beeman V	Kevin O'Shea
1968	Robert H. Mendelsohn	William C. Blake	John Ertola	Jack Morrison	Dorothy von Beroldingen	Terry Francois	Leo T. McCarthy	Roger Boas	Peter Tamaras	James Mailliard	Ron Pelosi
1969	Robert H. Mendelsohn	William C. Blake	John Ertola	Jack Morrison	Dorothy von Beroldingen	Terry Francois	Robert E. Gonzales	Roger Boas	Peter Tamaras	James Mailliard	Ron Pelosi
1970	Robert H. Mendelsohn	Dianne Feinstein	John Ertola	John Barbagelata	Dorothy von Beroldingen	Terry Francois	Robert E. Gonzales	Roger Boas	Peter Tamaras	James Mailliard	Ron Pelosi
1971	Robert H. Mendelsohn	Dianne Feinstein	Michael J. Driscoll	John Barbagelata	Dorothy von Beroldingen	Terry Francois	Robert E. Gonzales	Roger Boas	Peter Tamaras	James Mailliard	Ron Pelosi
1972	Robert H. Mendelsohn	Dianne Feinstein	John L. Molinari	John Barbagelata	Dorothy von Beroldingen	Terry Francois	Robert E. Gonzales	Roger Boas	Peter Tamaras	Quentin L. Kopp	Ron Pelosi
1973	Robert H. Mendelsohn	Dianne Feinstein	John L. Molinari	John Barbagelata	Dorothy von Beroldingen	Terry Francois	Robert E. Gonzales	George Chinn	Peter Tamaras	Quentin L. Kopp	Ron Pelosi
1974	Robert H. Mendelsohn	Dianne Feinstein	John L. Molinari	John Barbagelata	Dorothy von Beroldingen	Terry Francois	Robert E. Gonzales	Alfred Nelder	Peter Tamaras	Quentin L. Kopp	Ron Pelosi
1975	Robert H. Mendelsohn	Dianne Feinstein	John L. Molinari	John Barbagelata	Dorothy von Beroldingen	Terry Francois	Robert E. Gonzales	Alfred Nelder	Peter Tamaras	Quentin L. Kopp	Ron Pelosi
1976	Robert H. Mendelsohn	Dianne Feinstein	John L. Molinari	John Barbagelata	Dorothy von Beroldingen	Terry Francois	Robert E. Gonzales	Alfred Nelder	Peter Tamaras	Quentin L. Kopp	Ron Pelosi
1977	Gordon Lau	Dianne Feinstein	John L. Molinari	John Barbagelata	Jane Murphy	Terry Francois	Robert E. Gonzales	Alfred Nelder	Peter Tamaras	Quentin L. Kopp	Ron Pelosi
Year											

=== 11 members elected by district (1978–1980) ===
Year	District										
Year	1	2	3	4	5	6	7	8	9	10	11
1978	Gordon Lau	Dianne Feinstein	John L. Molinari	Ella Hill Hutch	Harvey Milk	Carol Ruth Silver	Robert E. Gonzales	Dan White	Lee S. Dolson	Quentin L. Kopp	Ron Pelosi
1979	Gordon Lau	Louise Renne	John L. Molinari	Ella Hill Hutch	Harry Britt	Carol Ruth Silver	Robert E. Gonzales	Donald T. Horanzy	Lee S. Dolson	Quentin L. Kopp	Ron Pelosi
1980	Ed Lawson	Louise Renne	John L. Molinari	Ella Hill Hutch	Harry Britt	Carol Ruth Silver	Doris M. Ward	Donald T. Horanzy	Nancy G. Walker	Quentin L. Kopp	John Bardis
Year	1	2	3	4	5	6	7	8	9	10	11
Year	District										

=== 11 members elected at-large (1981–2000) ===
Year	Seat										
1981	Carol Ruth Silver	Richard Hongisto	John L. Molinari	Louise Renne	Harry Britt	Ella Hill Hutch	Doris M. Ward	Wendy Nelder	Lee S. Dolson	Quentin L. Kopp	Nancy G. Walker
1982	Carol Ruth Silver	Richard Hongisto	John L. Molinari	Louise Renne	Harry Britt	Willie B. Kennedy	Doris M. Ward	Wendy Nelder	Lee S. Dolson	Quentin L. Kopp	Nancy G. Walker
1983	Carol Ruth Silver	Richard Hongisto	John L. Molinari	Louise Renne	Harry Britt	Willie B. Kennedy	Doris M. Ward	Wendy Nelder	Bill J. Maher	Quentin L. Kopp	Nancy G. Walker
1984	Carol Ruth Silver	Richard Hongisto	John L. Molinari	Louise Renne	Harry Britt	Willie B. Kennedy	Doris M. Ward	Wendy Nelder	Bill J. Maher	Quentin L. Kopp	Nancy G. Walker
1985	Carol Ruth Silver	Richard Hongisto	John L. Molinari	Louise Renne	Harry Britt	Willie B. Kennedy	Doris M. Ward	Wendy Nelder	Bill J. Maher	Quentin L. Kopp	Nancy G. Walker
1986	Carol Ruth Silver	Richard Hongisto	John L. Molinari	Tom Hsieh	Harry Britt	Willie B. Kennedy	Doris M. Ward	Wendy Nelder	Bill J. Maher	Jim Gonzalez	Nancy G. Walker
1987	Carol Ruth Silver	Richard Hongisto	John L. Molinari	Tom Hsieh	Harry Britt	Willie B. Kennedy	Doris M. Ward	Wendy Nelder	Bill J. Maher	Jim Gonzalez	Nancy G. Walker
1988	Carol Ruth Silver	Richard Hongisto	John L. Molinari	Tom Hsieh	Harry Britt	Willie B. Kennedy	Doris M. Ward	Wendy Nelder	Bill J. Maher	Jim Gonzalez	Nancy G. Walker
1989	Terence Hallinan	Richard Hongisto	Angela Alioto	Tom Hsieh	Harry Britt	Willie B. Kennedy	Doris M. Ward	Wendy Nelder	Bill J. Maher	Jim Gonzalez	Nancy G. Walker
1990	Terence Hallinan	Richard Hongisto	Angela Alioto	Tom Hsieh	Harry Britt	Willie B. Kennedy	Doris M. Ward	Wendy Nelder	Bill J. Maher	Jim Gonzalez	Nancy G. Walker
1991	Terence Hallinan	Kevin Shelley	Angela Alioto	Tom Hsieh	Harry Britt	Willie B. Kennedy	Doris M. Ward	Roberta Achtenberg	Bill J. Maher	Jim Gonzalez	Carole Migden
1992	Terence Hallinan	Kevin Shelley	Angela Alioto	Tom Hsieh	Harry Britt	Willie B. Kennedy	Annemarie Conroy	Roberta Achtenberg	Bill J. Maher	Jim Gonzalez	Carole Migden
1993	Terence Hallinan	Kevin Shelley	Angela Alioto	Tom Hsieh	Sue Bierman	Willie B. Kennedy	Annemarie Conroy	Roberta Achtenberg	Bill J. Maher	Barbara Kaufman	Carole Migden
1994	Terence Hallinan	Kevin Shelley	Angela Alioto	Tom Hsieh	Sue Bierman	Willie B. Kennedy	Annemarie Conroy	Susan Leal	Bill J. Maher	Barbara Kaufman	Carole Migden
1995	Terence Hallinan	Kevin Shelley	Angela Alioto	Tom Hsieh	Sue Bierman	Willie B. Kennedy	Mabel Teng	Susan Leal	Tom Ammiano	Barbara Kaufman	Carole Migden
1996	Terence Hallinan	Kevin Shelley	Angela Alioto	Tom Hsieh	Sue Bierman	Leslie Rachel Katz	Mabel Teng	Susan Leal	Tom Ammiano	Barbara Kaufman	Carole Migden
1997	Michael Yaki	Gavin Newsom	José Medina	Leland Yee	Sue Bierman	Leslie Rachel Katz	Mabel Teng	Susan Leal	Tom Ammiano	Barbara Kaufman	Amos C. Brown
1998	Michael Yaki	Gavin Newsom	José Medina	Leland Yee	Sue Bierman	Leslie Rachel Katz	Mabel Teng	Susan Leal	Tom Ammiano	Barbara Kaufman	Amos C. Brown
1999	Michael Yaki	Gavin Newsom	José Medina	Leland Yee	Sue Bierman	Leslie Rachel Katz	Mabel Teng	Mark Leno	Tom Ammiano	Barbara Kaufman	Amos C. Brown
2000	Michael Yaki	Gavin Newsom	Alicia Becerril	Leland Yee	Sue Bierman	Leslie Rachel Katz	Mabel Teng	Mark Leno	Tom Ammiano	Barbara Kaufman	Amos C. Brown
Year	Seat										

=== 11 members elected by district (2001–present) ===
Year	District										
Year	1	2	3	4	5	6	7	8	9	10	11
2001	Jake McGoldrick	Gavin Newsom	Aaron Peskin	Leland Yee	Matt Gonzalez	Chris Daly	Tony Hall	Mark Leno	Tom Ammiano	Sophie Maxwell	Gerardo Sandoval
2002	Jake McGoldrick	Gavin Newsom	Aaron Peskin	Leland Yee	Matt Gonzalez	Chris Daly	Tony Hall	Mark Leno	Tom Ammiano	Sophie Maxwell	Gerardo Sandoval
2003	Jake McGoldrick	Gavin Newsom	Aaron Peskin	Fiona Ma	Matt Gonzalez	Chris Daly	Tony Hall	Bevan Dufty	Tom Ammiano	Sophie Maxwell	Gerardo Sandoval
2004	Jake McGoldrick	Michela Alioto-Pier	Aaron Peskin	Fiona Ma	Matt Gonzalez	Chris Daly	Tony Hall	Bevan Dufty	Tom Ammiano	Sophie Maxwell	Gerardo Sandoval
2005	Jake McGoldrick	Michela Alioto-Pier	Aaron Peskin	Fiona Ma	Ross Mirkarimi	Chris Daly	Sean Elsbernd	Bevan Dufty	Tom Ammiano	Sophie Maxwell	Gerardo Sandoval
2006	Jake McGoldrick	Michela Alioto-Pier	Aaron Peskin	Fiona Ma	Ross Mirkarimi	Chris Daly	Sean Elsbernd	Bevan Dufty	Tom Ammiano	Sophie Maxwell	Gerardo Sandoval
2007	Jake McGoldrick	Michela Alioto-Pier	Aaron Peskin	Ed Jew	Ross Mirkarimi	Chris Daly	Sean Elsbernd	Bevan Dufty	Tom Ammiano	Sophie Maxwell	Gerardo Sandoval
2008	Jake McGoldrick	Michela Alioto-Pier	Aaron Peskin	Carmen Chu	Ross Mirkarimi	Chris Daly	Sean Elsbernd	Bevan Dufty	Tom Ammiano	Sophie Maxwell	Gerardo Sandoval
2009	Eric Mar	Michela Alioto-Pier	David Chiu	Carmen Chu	Ross Mirkarimi	Chris Daly	Sean Elsbernd	Bevan Dufty	David Campos	Sophie Maxwell	John Avalos
2010	Eric Mar	Michela Alioto-Pier	David Chiu	Carmen Chu	Ross Mirkarimi	Chris Daly	Sean Elsbernd	Bevan Dufty	David Campos	Sophie Maxwell	John Avalos
2011	Eric Mar	Mark Farrell	David Chiu	Carmen Chu	Ross Mirkarimi	Jane Kim	Sean Elsbernd	Scott Wiener	David Campos	Malia Cohen	John Avalos
2012	Eric Mar	Mark Farrell	David Chiu	Carmen Chu	Christina Olague	Jane Kim	Sean Elsbernd	Scott Wiener	David Campos	Malia Cohen	John Avalos
2013	Eric Mar	Mark Farrell	David Chiu	Katy Tang	London Breed	Jane Kim	Norman Yee	Scott Wiener	David Campos	Malia Cohen	John Avalos
2014	Eric Mar	Mark Farrell	David Chiu	Katy Tang	London Breed	Jane Kim	Norman Yee	Scott Wiener	David Campos	Malia Cohen	John Avalos
2015	Eric Mar	Mark Farrell	Julie Christensen	Katy Tang	London Breed	Jane Kim	Norman Yee	Scott Wiener	David Campos	Malia Cohen	John Avalos
2016	Eric Mar	Mark Farrell	Aaron Peskin	Katy Tang	London Breed	Jane Kim	Norman Yee	Scott Wiener	David Campos	Malia Cohen	John Avalos
2017	Sandra Lee Fewer	Mark Farrell	Aaron Peskin	Katy Tang	London Breed	Jane Kim	Norman Yee	Jeff Sheehy	Hillary Ronen	Malia Cohen	Ahsha Safaí
2018	Sandra Lee Fewer	Catherine Stefani	Aaron Peskin	Katy Tang	Vallie Brown	Jane Kim	Norman Yee	Jeff Sheehy	Hillary Ronen	Malia Cohen	Ahsha Safaí
2019	Sandra Lee Fewer	Catherine Stefani	Aaron Peskin	Gordon Mar	Vallie Brown	Matt Haney	Norman Yee	Rafael Mandelman	Hillary Ronen	Shamann Walton	Ahsha Safaí
2020	Sandra Lee Fewer	Catherine Stefani	Aaron Peskin	Gordon Mar	Dean Preston	Matt Haney	Norman Yee	Rafael Mandelman	Hillary Ronen	Shamann Walton	Ahsha Safaí
2021	Connie Chan	Catherine Stefani	Aaron Peskin	Gordon Mar	Dean Preston	Matt Haney	Myrna Melgar	Rafael Mandelman	Hillary Ronen	Shamann Walton	Ahsha Safaí
2022	Connie Chan	Catherine Stefani	Aaron Peskin	Gordon Mar	Dean Preston	Matt Dorsey	Myrna Melgar	Rafael Mandelman	Hillary Ronen	Shamann Walton	Ahsha Safaí
2023	Connie Chan	Catherine Stefani	Aaron Peskin	Joel Engardio (Note: Joel Engardio was recalled by voters in September 2025. Succeeded by mayoral appointment of Beya Alcaraz on November 6, 2025. Alcaraz resigned seven days later.)	Dean Preston	Matt Dorsey	Myrna Melgar	Rafael Mandelman	Hillary Ronen	Shamann Walton	Ahsha Safaí
2024	Connie Chan	Catherine Stefani	Aaron Peskin	Joel Engardio	Dean Preston	Matt Dorsey	Myrna Melgar	Rafael Mandelman	Hillary Ronen	Shamann Walton	Ahsha Safaí
2025	Connie Chan	Stephen Sherrill	Danny Sauter	Joel Engardio	Bilal Mahmood	Matt Dorsey	Myrna Melgar	Rafael Mandelman	Jackie Fielder	Shamann Walton	Chyanne Chen
2026	Connie Chan	Stephen Sherrill	Danny Sauter	Beya Alcaraz; Alan Wong	Bilal Mahmood	Matt Dorsey	Myrna Melgar	Rafael Mandelman	Jackie Fielder	Shamann Walton	Chyanne Chen

=== Timeline of supervisors since 2000 ===
This graphical timeline depicts the composition of the San Francisco Board of Supervisors since district elections were resumed in November 2000, along with the mayor in office at each point. Each color corresponds to one of the city's 11 districts, with a paler shade indicating periods when the officeholder was appointed rather than elected.

Note on District 4

== Board members and transitions since 1980 ==
Name	Dates	Comments
Terry A. Francois	1964–1978	Appointed 1964 by Mayor John F. Shelley to succeed Supervisor John J. Ferdon. Elected 1967, 1971, and 1975. Resigned 1978.
Robert H. Mendelsohn	1968–1977	Elected 1967, 1971, and 1975. Resigned 1977 to accept appointment by President Jimmy Carter as Assistant Secretary of the Interior.
Ronald Pelosi	1968–1980	Elected 1967, 1971, 1975, and 1977. Defeated for re-election 1979.
Robert E. Gonzales	1969–1980	Appointed 1969 by Mayor Joseph Alioto to succeed Supervisor Leo T. McCarthy. Elected 1971, 1975, and 1977.
Dianne Feinstein*	1970–1978	Elected 1969, 1973, and 1977. Served as acting mayor upon the assassination of Mayor George Moscone in 1978. Elected mayor by the Board of Supervisors one week later.
Quentin L. Kopp*	1972–1986	Elected 1971, 1975, 1977, 1980, and 1984. Resigned 1986 after election to the California State Senate.
John L. Molinari*	1972–1989	Elected 1971, 1975, 1977, 1979, 1980, and 1984. Did not seek re-election in 1988.
Gordon J. Lau	1977–1980	Appointed 1977 by Mayor George Moscone to succeed Supervisor Robert H. Mendelsohn. Elected 1977. Defeated for re-election 1979.
Jane McKaskle Murphy	1977–1978	Appointed 1977 by Mayor George Moscone to succeed Supervisor Dorothy von Beroldingen.
Lee S. Dolson	1978–1980, 1981–1983	Elected 1977. Defeated for re-election 1979. Elected 1980. Defeated for re-election 1982.
Ella Hill Hutch	1978–1981	Elected 1977 and 1980. Died in office in 1981.
Harvey Milk	1978	Elected 1977. Assassinated 1978.
Carol Ruth Silver	1978–1988	Elected 1977, 1980, and 1984. Defeated for re-election 1988.
Dan White	1978	Elected 1977. Resigned 1978. Assassinated Mayor George Moscone and Supervisor Harvey Milk.
Donald T. Horanzy	1978–1981	Appointed 1978 by Mayor Dianne Feinstein to succeed Supervisor Dan White. Defeated for first election in 1980.
Louise Renne	1978–1986	Appointed 1978 by Mayor Dianne Feinstein to succeed Feinstein on the Board of Supervisors. Elected 1980 and 1984. Resigned 1986 to accept appointment by Feinstein as city attorney.
Harry Britt*	1979–1993	Appointed 1979 by Mayor Dianne Feinstein to succeed Supervisor Harvey Milk. Elected 1980, 1984, and 1988. Did not seek re-election in 1992.
John Bardis	1980–1981	Elected 1979. Defeated for re-election 1980.
Ed Lawson	1980–1981	Elected 1979. Defeated for re-election 1980.
Nancy G. Walker*	1980–1991	Elected 1979, 1980, 1982, and 1986. Did not seek re-election in 1990.
Doris M. Ward*	1980–1992	Elected 1979, 1980, 1982, 1986, and 1990. Resigned 1992 to accept appointment by Mayor Frank Jordan as assessor.
Richard D. Hongisto	1981–1991	Elected 1980, 1982, and 1986. Did not seek re-election in 1990, running successfully for assessor.
Wendy Nelder*	1981–1991	Elected 1980, 1982, and 1986. Did not seek re-election in 1990, running unsuccessfully for assessor.
Willie B. Kennedy	1981–1996	Appointed 1981 by Mayor Dianne Feinstein to succeed Supervisor Ella Hill Hutch. Elected 1984, 1988, and 1992. Resigned 1996 to become administrative officer of the Public Transition Development Corporation.
Bill Maher	1983–1995	Elected 1982, 1986, and 1990. Ineligible to seek re-election in 1994.
Tom Hsieh	1986–1997	Appointed 1986 by Mayor Dianne Feinstein to succeed Supervisor Louise Renne. Elected 1988 and 1992. Ineligible to seek re-election in 1996.
Jim Gonzalez	1986–1993	Appointed 1986 by Mayor Dianne Feinstein to succeed Supervisor Quentin L. Kopp. Elected 1988. Defeated for re-election 1992.
Angela Alioto*	1989–1997	Elected 1988 and 1992. Ineligible to seek re-election in 1996.
Terence Hallinan	1989–1996	Elected 1988 and 1992. Resigned 1996 after election as district attorney.
Carole Migden	1991–1996	Elected 1990 and 1994. Resigned 1996 after election to the California State Assembly.
Roberta Achtenberg	1991–1993	Elected 1990. Resigned 1993 to accept appointment by President Bill Clinton as Assistant Secretary of Housing and Urban Development.
Kevin Shelley*	1991–1996	Elected 1990 and 1994. Resigned 1996 after election to the California State Assembly.
Annemarie Conroy	1992–1995	Appointed 1992 by Mayor Frank Jordan to succeed Supervisor Doris M. Ward. Defeated for first election in 1994.
Sue Bierman	1993–2001	Elected 1992 and 1996. Ineligible to seek re-election in 2000.
Barbara Kaufman*	1993–2001	Elected 1992 and 1996. Ineligible to seek re-election in 2000.
Susan Leal	1993–1998	Appointed 1993 by Mayor Frank Jordan to succeed Supervisor Roberta Achtenberg. Elected 1994. Resigned 1998 after election as city treasurer.
Tom Ammiano*	1995–2008	Elected 1994, 1998, 2000, and 2004. Resigned 2008 after election to the California State Assembly.
Mabel Teng	1995–2001	Elected 1994 and 1998. Defeated for re-election 2000.
Michael Yaki	1996–2001	Appointed 1996 by Mayor Willie Brown to succeed Supervisor Terence Hallinan. Elected 1996. Defeated for re-election 2000.
Amos C. Brown	1996–2001	Appointed 1996 by Mayor Willie Brown to succeed Supervisor Carole Migden. Elected 1998. Defeated for re-election 2000.
Leslie Rachel Katz	1996–2001	Appointed 1996 by Mayor Willie Brown to succeed Supervisor Willie B. Kennedy. Elected 1996. Did not seek re-election in 2000.
Leland Yee	1997–2002	Elected 1996 and 2000. Resigned 2002 after election to the California State Assembly.
José Medina	1997–1999	Elected 1996. Resigned 1999 to accept appointment by Governor Gray Davis as Director of the California Department of Transportation.
Gavin Newsom	1997–2004	Appointed 1997 by Mayor Willie Brown to succeed Supervisor Kevin Shelley. Elected 1998, 2000, and 2002. Resigned 2004 after election as mayor.
Mark Leno	1998–2002	Appointed 1998 by Mayor Willie Brown to succeed Supervisor Susan Leal. Elected 1998 and 2000. Resigned 2002 after election to the California State Assembly.
Alicia Becerril	1999–2001	Appointed 1999 by Mayor Willie Brown to succeed Supervisor José Medina. Defeated for first election in 2000.
Matt Gonzalez*	2001–2005	Elected 2000. Did not seek re-election in 2004.
Tony Hall	2001–2004	Elected 2000. Resigned 2004 to accept appointment as executive director of the Treasure Island Development Authority.
Sophie Maxwell	2001–2011	Elected 2000, 2002, and 2006. Ineligible to seek re-election in 2010.
Jake McGoldrick	2001–2009	Elected 2000 and 2004. Ineligible to seek re-election in 2008.
Aaron Peskin*	2001–2009, 2015–2025	Elected 2000 and 2004. Ineligible to seek re-election in 2008. Elected 2015, 2016, and 2020. Ineligible to seek re-election in 2024.
Chris Daly	2001–2011	Elected 2000, 2002, and 2006. Ineligible to seek re-election in 2010.
Gerardo Sandoval	2001–2009	Elected 2000 and 2004. Ineligible to seek re-election in 2008.
Bevan Dufty	2002–2011	Elected 2002 and 2006. Appointed post-election 2002 by Mayor Willie Brown to succeed Supervisor Mark Leno. Ineligible to seek re-election in 2010.
Fiona Ma	2002–2006	Elected 2002. Appointed post-election 2002 by Mayor Willie Brown to succeed Supervisor Leland Yee. Resigned 2006 after election to the California State Assembly.
Michela Alioto-Pier	2004–2011	Appointed 2004 by Mayor Gavin Newsom to succeed Newsom on the Board of Supervisors. Elected 2004 and 2006. Ruled ineligible by the San Francisco Department of Elections, citing an opinion by City Attorney Dennis Herrera, to seek re-election in 2010. Alioto-Pier filed lawsuit in San Francisco Superior Court asserting that, under the term limits law, she was eligible to seek re-election in 2010, and if re-elected, would be termed out as of the 2014 election instead. A Superior Court judge ruled in her favor, but the California Court of Appeal overturned that ruling, thereby removing her from the 2010 ballot for District 2 supervisor. Alioto-Pier appealed that ruling to the Supreme Court of California which declined to hear the case.
Sean Elsbernd	2004–2013	Appointed 2004 by Mayor Gavin Newsom to succeed Supervisor Tony Hall. Elected 2004 and 2008. Ineligible to seek re-election in 2012.
Ross Mirkarimi	2005–2012	Elected 2004 and 2008. Resigned 2012 after election as sheriff.
Ed Jew	2006–2007	Elected 2006. Appointed post-election 2006 by Mayor Gavin Newsom to succeed Supervisor Fiona Ma. Suspended by Mayor Newsom on September 25, 2007, pending the outcome of a formal process to remove him from the board. A separate civil suit was initiated by the city to remove him as well. Resigned on January 11, 2008, prior to the completion of the removal process and the civil lawsuit, and agreed not to seek public office for five years.
Carmen Chu	2007–2008, 2008–2013	Appointed 2007 by Mayor Gavin Newsom to succeed Supervisor Ed Jew, after his suspension, pending final action by the Board of Supervisors on the question of whether to remove Jew from office. Jew resigned from office 2008, prior to the completion of the removal process, ending Chu's interim term. Under the charter, the seat became vacant upon Jew's resignation and remained vacant for about five and a half hours until a new appointment was made. Appointed 2008 by Mayor Newsom to succeed Supervisor Ed Jew, after his resignation. Elected 2008 to serve out the remainder of Jew's term, which expired January 2011. Elected 2010. Resigned 2013 to accept appointment by Mayor Ed Lee as assessor-recorder.
David Campos	2008–2017	Elected 2008 and 2012. Appointed post-election 2008 by Mayor Gavin Newsom to succeed Supervisor Tom Ammiano. Ineligible to seek re-election in 2016.
Eric Mar	2009–2017	Elected 2008 and 2012. Ineligible to seek re-election in 2016.
John Avalos	2009–2017	Elected 2008 and 2012. Ineligible to seek re-election in 2016.
David Chiu*	2009–2014	Elected 2008 and 2012. Resigned 2014 after election to the California State Assembly.
Mark Farrell	2011–2018	Elected 2010 and 2014. Elected mayor by the Board of Supervisors in 2018, following the death of Mayor Ed Lee.
Malia Cohen*	2011–2019	Elected 2010 and 2014. Ineligible to seek re-election in 2018. Resigned 2019 after election to the State Board of Equalization.
Scott Wiener	2011–2016	Elected 2010 and 2014. Resigned 2016 after election to the California State Senate
Jane Kim	2011–2019	Elected 2010 and 2014. Ineligible to seek re-election in 2018.
Christina Olague	2012–2013	Appointed 2012 by Mayor Ed Lee to succeed Supervisor Ross Mirkarimi. Defeated for first election in 2012.
Norman Yee*	2013–2021	Elected 2012 and 2016. Ineligible to seek re-election in 2020.
London Breed*	2013–2018	Elected 2012 and 2016. As board president, served as acting mayor from the death of Mayor Ed Lee in December 2017 until the board's appointment of Mark Farrell as mayor in January 2018. Resigned 2018 after election as mayor.
Katy Tang*	2013–2019	Appointed 2013 by Mayor Ed Lee to succeed Supervisor Carmen Chu. Elected 2013 and 2014. Did not seek re-election in 2018.
Julie Christensen	2015	Appointed 2015 by Mayor Ed Lee to succeed Supervisor David Chiu. Defeated for first election in 2015.
Hillary Ronen	2017–2025	Elected 2016 and 2020. Ineligible to seek re-election in 2024.
Jeff Sheehy	2017–2018	Appointed 2017 by Mayor Ed Lee to succeed Supervisor Scott Wiener. Defeated for first election in June 2018.
Sandra Lee Fewer	2017–2021	Elected 2016. Did not seek re-election in 2020.
Ahsha Safaí	2017–2025	Elected 2016 and 2020. Ineligible to seek re-election in 2024.
Catherine Stefani	2018–2024	Appointed 2018 by Mayor Mark Farrell to succeed Farrell on the Board of Supervisors. Elected 2018 and 2022. Resigned 2024 after election to the California State Assembly.
Rafael Mandelman*	2018–present	Elected June 2018, November 2018, and 2022. Ineligible to seek re-election in 2026.
Vallie Brown	2018–2019	Appointed 2018 by Mayor London Breed to succeed Breed on the Board of Supervisors. Defeated for first election in 2019.
Gordon Mar	2019–2023	Elected 2018. Defeated for re-election 2022.
Matt Haney	2019–2022	Elected 2018. Resigned 2022 after election to the California State Assembly.
Shamann Walton*	2019–present	Elected 2018 and 2022. Ineligible to seek re-election in 2026.
Dean Preston	2019–2025	Elected 2019 and 2020. Defeated for re-election in 2024.
Connie Chan	2021–present	Elected 2020.
Myrna Melgar	2021–present	Elected 2020.
Matt Dorsey	2022–present	Appointed 2022 by Mayor London Breed to succeed Supervisor Matt Haney. Elected 2022.
Joel Engardio	2023–2025	Elected 2022. Recalled by voters in September 2025.
Stephen Sherrill	2024–present	Appointed 2024 by Mayor London Breed to succeed Stefani on the Board of Supervisors.
Danny Sauter	2025–present	Elected 2024.
Bilal Mahmood	2025–present	Elected 2024.
Jackie Fielder	2025–present	Elected 2024.
Chyanne Chen	2025–present	Elected 2024.
Beya Alcaraz	2025	Appointed in 2025 by Mayor Daniel Lurie after the recall of Joel Engardio. Resigned after one week in office.
Alan Wong	2025–present	Appointed in 2025 by Mayor Daniel Lurie after the resignation of Beya Alcaraz.

Current members shaded in yellow. Members who served as president of the Board of Supervisors during part of their tenure on the board are denoted with an asterisk (*).

== Gallery ==
1873, I

1873, II

1877, I

1877, II

1879, I

1879, II

1880

1882, I

1882, II

1884, I

1884, II

1888, I

1888, II

1890, I

1890, II

1892, I

1892, II

1894, I

1894, II

1896, I

1896, II

1897, I

1897, II

1899, I

1899, II

1900, I

1900, II

1902, I

1902, II

1904, I

1904, II

1905, I

1905, II

1909, I

1909, II

1910, I

1910, II

1911, I

1911, II

1912, I

1912, II

1913, I

1913, II

1916, I

1916, II

1918, I

1918, II

== Sources ==
- "Section 3.100. Powers and Responsibilities". 1996 Charter of the City and County of San Francisco. American Legal Publishing Corporation.
- "Section 15.105. Suspension and Removal". 1996 Charter of the City and County of San Francisco. American Legal Publishing Corporation.
- Green, Emily (January 5, 2017). "AIDS activist Sheehy to succeed Wiener as SF supervisor". San Francisco Chronicle.
- Hichborn, Franklin (1915), "The System" as Uncovered by the San Francisco Graft Prosecution, San Francisco: James H. Barry Company
