= Assassinations of George Moscone and Harvey Milk =

1978 murders in San Francisco, California, US

- Part of violence against LGBT people in the United States
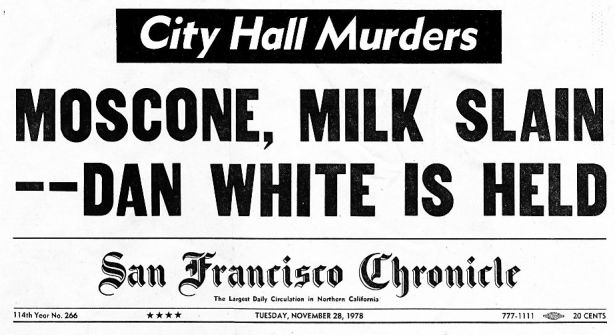
- San Francisco Chronicle's front page for November 28, 1978

- Assassinations of George Moscone and Harvey Milk (San Francisco)
- Location: 37°46′45″N 122°25′10″W; City Hall, San Francisco, U.S.
- Date: November 27, 1978; 47 years ago 10:45 – 10:55 a.m. (PST)
- Target: George Moscone, age 49; Harvey Milk, age 48
- Attack type: Assassination, spree shooting
- Weapon: .38-caliber Smith & Wesson Model 36 Chief's Special
- Victims: Moscone and Milk (both killed)
- Perpetrator: Dan White
- Charges: First-degree murder with special circumstances (2 counts)
- Verdict: Guilty on the lesser offenses of voluntary manslaughter
- Convictions: Voluntary manslaughter (2 counts)
- Sentence: 7 years and 8 months in prison (paroled after 5 years)

On November 27, 1978, George Moscone, the 37th mayor of San Francisco, and Harvey Milk, a member of the San Francisco Board of Supervisors, were both shot and killed inside San Francisco City Hall by former supervisor Dan White. On the morning of that day, Moscone intended to announce that the Supervisor position from which White had previously resigned would be given to someone else. White, angered, entered City Hall before the scheduled announcement and first shot Moscone in the Mayor's office, then Milk in White's former office space, before escaping the building. Board of Supervisors president Dianne Feinstein first announced Moscone and Milk's deaths to the media, and because of Moscone's death, succeeded him as acting mayor.

White was charged with first-degree murder with circumstances that made him eligible for the death penalty. However, on May 21, 1979, White was convicted of the lesser crime of voluntary manslaughter and was sentenced to seven years' imprisonment, which resulted in the White Night riots and the abolition of the diminished capacity criminal defense in California. It also led to the commonly cited "Twinkie defense", as the defense had stated in passing that White's diminished capacity was partially evidenced by his consumption of sugar-laden junk food. White committed suicide in 1985, a year and a half after his release from prison.

Feinstein was elected by the Board of Supervisors to become the first female mayor of San Francisco on December 4, 1978, a title she would hold for the next ten years. She eventually became a United States senator for California until her death in 2023.

== Preceding events ==
In the mid-1970s, San Francisco and the surrounding Bay Area were the scene of a series of anti-government bombings largely attributed to the New World Liberation Front, a leftist militant group. Members of the city government, including the mayor, had received bombs in the mail or were subjected to bomb threats, as was City Hall itself. On February 9, 1977, a tighter security regime began at City Hall to protect the mayor and members of the San Francisco Board of Supervisors, including locking most entrances, and providing security guards and metal detectors at public entrances, measures which had remained through 1978.

Prior to entering city politics, Dan White had been a member of both the San Francisco Police Department (SFPD) and the San Francisco Fire Department (SFFD). He and Harvey Milk were each elected to the Board of Supervisors in the November 1977 elections, which introduced district-based seats. The election ushered in "a range of legislators perhaps unmatched in San Francisco history in their diversity", including its first Chinese American (Gordon Lau), first unwed mother (Carol Ruth Silver), first black woman (Ella Hill Hutch), first homosexual (Harvey Milk) and first former firefighter (Dan White). All supervisors were sworn in on January 9, 1978, with Dianne Feinstein as the president of the board. The city charter prohibited anyone from retaining two city jobs simultaneously, so White resigned from his higher paying job with the SFFD. During 1978, White would try to supplement his salary as a Supervisor, totaling $9,600 per year (equivalent to $47,400 in 2025), with a food concession stand on Pier 39.

With regard to business development issues, the eleven-member Board was split roughly 6–5 in favor of pro-growth advocates including White, over those who advocated the more neighborhood-oriented approach favored by Mayor George Moscone, who was also elected in 1977. Debate among the board members was sometimes acrimonious and saw White verbally sparring with other supervisors, including Milk and Carol Ruth Silver. Further tension arose when Milk voted in favor of placing a group home within White's district. Subsequently, White would cast the only vote in opposition to San Francisco's landmark gay rights ordinance, passed by the Board on April 3, 1978 and signed by Moscone soon after.

=== White's resignation ===
A city charter amendment to raise the salaries of Supervisors was proposed in the summer of 1978, and a committee White was on stopped the amendment from going forward, in the context of the then-recent passage of California Proposition 13 in June. The low salary of the Supervisor position took its toll on White, and he tendered his resignation to Moscone on November 10. White stated that he could not support his family on only the Supervisor salary and that being forced to work two jobs was preventing him from adequately serving his constituents. White's resignation quickly renewed a call to amend the city charter to raise Supervisor salaries, this time proposed in White's name by Silver. His resignation would leave an open seat on the Board of Supervisors, a vacancy which would be filled by appointment by Moscone. This alarmed some of the city's business interests and White's constituents, as it indicated the mayor would tip the balance of power on the Board and appoint a liberal representative for the more conservative district.

On November 15, five days after resigning, White asked Moscone to return his letter of resignation (a letter that had already been accepted and filed by the Board) and expressed his intent to continue serving as a Supervisor after receiving loans from family and receiving encouragement from constituents. Moscone returned the letter, but on November 16, City Attorney George Agnost ruled that White had in fact resigned and was no longer on the Board, pending legal review, and whether White could be appointed back to the position from which he had just resigned was also an open question. Moscone stated that if "legal problems" in the finality of White's resignation arose, he would appoint White back to the seat, but in any case, some of the more liberal city leaders, most notably Milk and Silver, lobbied Moscone not to reappoint him. On November 17, Moscone stated that White's resignation was final and gave no indication that he was guaranteed to be re-appointed.

On November 18, news broke of the mass deaths of members of the Peoples Temple in Jonestown. Prior to the group's move to Guyana, the Temple had been based in San Francisco, so most of the dead were recent Bay Area residents, as was Leo Ryan, the United States Congressman who was murdered in the incident. The city was plunged into mourning, and the issue of White's vacant Board of Supervisors seat was pushed aside for several days. On November 21, Moscone confirmed that the city's legal position on White was that he had resigned, and further, that filling White's vacancy was a week away. He again made no guarantee of re-appointing White unless he was legally obligated to. White appeared to interpret Moscone's statements to mean that he would be re-appointed to his former position.

== Shooting ==
Rather than re-appoint White, Moscone decided to appoint Don Horanzy, a more liberal federal housing official, to White's former position on the Board. He scheduled a press conference to make this announcement on November 27, at 11:30 a.m.; advance copy had been sent to newspapers with late editions so they could begin preparing their stories.

White arranged for a former aide to drive him to City Hall on the morning Moscone was to make his announcement. He was carrying a five-round .38-caliber Smith & Wesson Model 36 Chief's Special loaded with hollow-point bullets (his service revolver from his work as a police officer), and ten extra rounds of ammunition in his coat pocket. White knocked on a basement lab window, (Note: At the time of the assassinations, the window White entered City Hall by was a basement window. After a 1995 seismic renovation, this floor became the first floor of City Hall, thus windows on that level are now first floor windows.) and told a building engineer inside that he had misplaced his keys. White climbed into the window at about 10:25 a.m., thereby avoiding metal detectors and guards at public entrances.

=== George Moscone ===
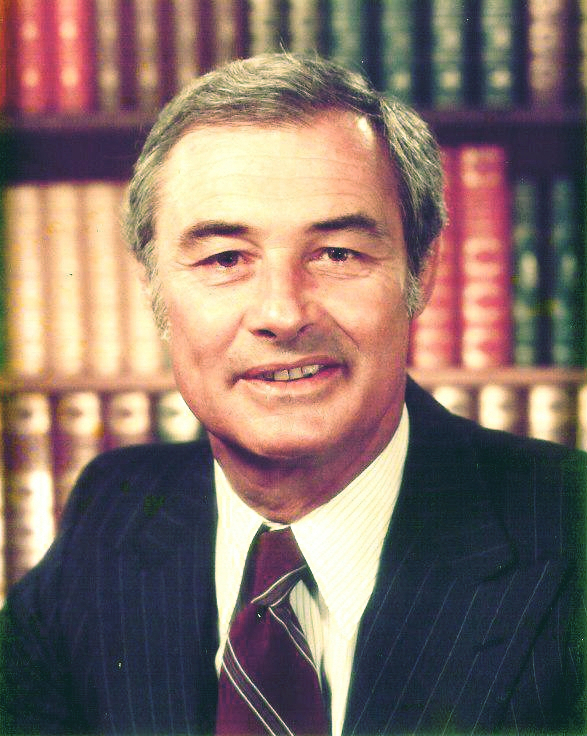
Mayor George Moscone c. 1976

White proceeded to Moscone's office, where the mayor was conferring with California Assemblyman Willie Brown. White requested a meeting with Moscone and was permitted to see him after the meeting with Brown ended.

As White entered Moscone's outer office, Brown exited through another door. Moscone met White in the outer office, where White requested again to be re-appointed to his former seat. Moscone refused, and their conversation turned into a heated argument over Horanzy's pending appointment. Wishing to avoid a public scene, Moscone suggested they retreat to a private lounge adjacent to his office. Witnesses later reported that they heard Moscone and White arguing, later followed by the gunshots that sounded like a car backfiring.

At approximately 10:45 a.m., as Moscone lit a cigarette and proceeded to pour two drinks, White pulled out his revolver. He then fired at the mayor's shoulder and chest, tearing his lung. After Moscone fell to the floor, White approached him, pointed his gun 6 inches (150 mm) from the mayor's head, and fired two additional bullets into Moscone's ear lobes, killing him instantly. White reloaded his revolver while standing over Moscone's body.

=== Harvey Milk ===
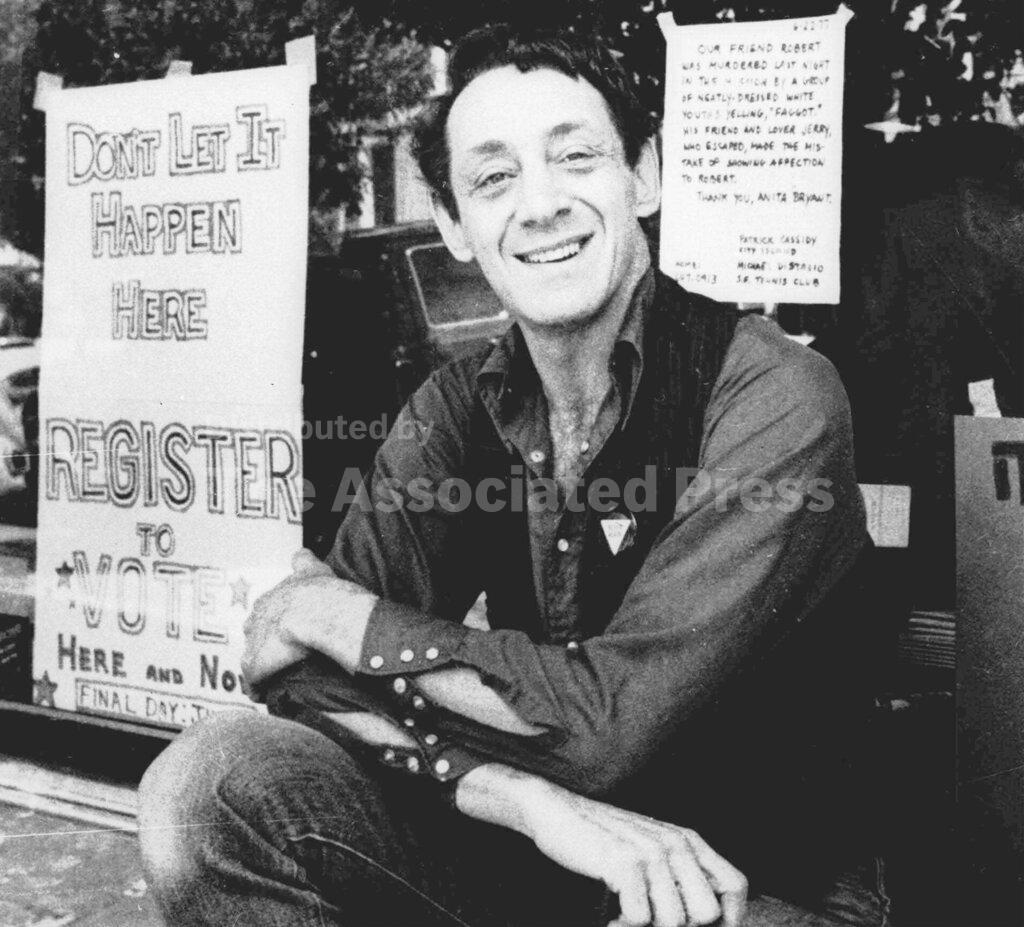
Supervisor Harvey Milk in 1977

Immediately following Moscone's murder, White left the mayor's office and hurried toward the shared office of the Board of Supervisors, at the other end of City Hall, where each supervisor had an enclosed cubicle and desk. Dianne Feinstein, who was then president of the San Francisco Board of Supervisors, saw White run past her office door and called after him. White responded with, "I have something to do first."

White intercepted Milk as he was speaking to a radio reporter and acquaintance in the Supervisors' office. White interrupted the conversation with a knock and asked Milk to step inside his former office for a moment. Milk agreed to join him. Once the door was closed, White positioned himself between the doorway and Milk, and after a brief conversation, opened fire on Milk at 10:55 a.m. The first bullet hit Milk's right wrist as he tried to protect himself. White continued firing rapidly, hitting Milk twice more in the chest, then fired a fourth bullet at Milk's head, killing him, followed by a fifth shot into his skull at close range.

White fled the scene before Feinstein entered the office and found Milk's body. She felt Milk's neck for a pulse, her finger entering a bullet wound. Rumors about what had happened began to circulate, but were not confirmed until about 11:20 a.m. At that time, Feinstein addressed assembled media which had expected the announcement of Horanzy's appointment. Feinstein, shaking so badly that she required support from the police chief while speaking, instead announced to shocked reporters that Moscone and Milk had both been murdered.

White left City Hall unchallenged. He took the keys of his former aide's car from her desk and drove to a diner, where he called his wife from a payphone; they met at a nearby church. Approximately thirty minutes after leaving City Hall, White turned himself in at the SFPD's Northern Station precinct, at which he had previously served as a police officer, to Frank Falzon and another detective, both former co-workers. In a police interrogation room that afternoon, White confessed to shooting Moscone and Milk, but denied premeditation. Part of the taped confession became public in 2014.

== Aftermath of the shootings ==
An impromptu candlelight march consisting of tens of thousands started in the Castro District and ended at the steps of City Hall. Joan Baez led "Amazing Grace", and the San Francisco Gay Men's Chorus sang a solemn hymn by Felix Mendelssohn. Upon learning of the assassinations, singer/songwriter Holly Near composed "Singing for Our Lives", also known as "Song for Harvey Milk".

Moscone and Milk both lay in state at City Hall. Moscone's funeral at St Mary's Cathedral was attended by 4,500 people. He was buried at Holy Cross Cemetery in Colma. Milk was cremated and his ashes were spread across the Pacific Ocean. Feinstein, as president of the Board of Supervisors, acceded to the mayor's office, becoming the first woman to serve in that office.

The coroner who worked on Moscone and Milk's bodies later concluded that the wrist and chest bullet wounds were not fatal, and that both victims probably would have survived with proper medical attention. However, the head wounds brought instant death without question, particularly because White fired at very close range.

=== New mayor and supervisors ===
White's resignation, and all subsequent events including the shootings, caused positional changes inside San Francisco's city government. At the top two levels, these were:

- Mayor of San Francisco: George Moscone, killed in office November 27, 1978, was immediately succeeded by Board of Supervisors President Dianne Feinstein as acting mayor, until elected as mayor in a vote of 6–2 among remaining active supervisors (excluding herself) on December 4. Feinstein would serve out the remainder of Moscone's term, then be elected to her first full term as mayor in November 1979.
- Board of Supervisors President: When Feinstein succeeded to mayor on December 4, a new president of the board of supervisors needed to be elected. This would be District 2 Supervisor John Molinari, elected by the Board on January 2, 1979.
- Board of Supervisors, District 8: Dan White resigned November 10, 1978. White was replaced by Don Horanzy, Moscone's original choice for District 8, when appointed by Mayor Feinstein on December 7.
- Board of Supervisors, District 5: Harvey Milk, killed in office November 27, 1978. Harry Britt was appointed to District 5 Supervisor by Mayor Feinstein on January 8, 1979.
- Board of Supervisors, District 2: Dianne Feinstein, who succeeded to mayor on December 4, left a vacancy in her own former supervisor district position. Feinstein appointed Louise Renne to district 2 on December 18.

== Trial and aftermath ==
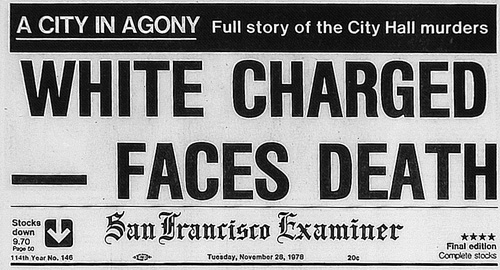
Cover of The San Francisco Examiner on November 28, 1978

White was charged with first-degree murder with two special circumstances, both of which had been passed into law through California Proposition 7 only three weeks before the assassinations. Specifically, the victim(s) were elected officials of a local government of California and the killing was intentionally carried out in retaliation for or to prevent the performance of the victim(s) official duties; and, more than one murder was committed. Murder with special circumstances meant that, if convicted, White could have faced the death penalty.

White's defense team claimed that he suffered from depression at the time of the shootings, evidenced by many changes in his behavior, including changes in his diet. Inaccurate media reports said his defense had presented junk food consumption as the cause of his mental state, rather than a symptom of it, leading to the derisive term "Twinkie defense"; this became a persistent myth, despite the fact that neither defense lawyer had argued junk food caused White to commit the shootings and had only mentioned Twinkies in passing. Rather, the defense argued that White's depression led to a state of mental diminished capacity, leaving him unable to have formed the premeditation necessary to commit first-degree murder. The jury accepted these arguments, and White was convicted of the lesser crime of voluntary manslaughter. He was sentenced to seven years' imprisonment.

The verdict proved to be highly controversial, and many felt that the punishment so poorly matched the deed and circumstances that most San Franciscans believed White essentially got away with murder. In particular, many in the local gay community were outraged by the verdict and the resulting reduced prison sentence. Since Milk had been homosexual, many felt that homophobia had been a motivating factor in the jury's decision. This groundswell of anger sparked the city's White Night riots immediately after the verdict was announced. The verdict also ultimately led to changes by the legislature in 1981 and in 1982 statewide voters passed Proposition 8, which ended California's diminished-capacity defense and substituted a somewhat different and slightly more limited "diminished actuality" defense.

White never made a direct statement of remorse, and only one relayed as hearsay was given by a prison duty nurse who attended to White in 1983. He was paroled in 1984 and served this parole in the Los Angeles area, away from San Francisco. Frank Falzon, the detective who took White's statement after the assassinations, said in 1998 that he met with White in 1984 and that White had admitted that not only was his killing of Moscone and Milk premeditated, but he had actually planned to kill Silver and Brown as well. Falzon quoted White as having said, "I was on a mission. I wanted four of them. Carol Ruth Silver, she was the biggest snake ... and Willie Brown, he was masterminding the whole thing." After serving his parole, White moved back to the San Francisco area in early 1985, and committed suicide there that October.

In November 1988, Falzon showed a KTVU reporter some of the evidence that still existed in police custody, including the clothing White had worn, a tape of his police interrogation, liquor bottles and glasses from the site of Moscone's shooting, and White's original resignation letter to Moscone. The revolver used in the murders was for a time assumed missing from police evidence storage. An SFPD clerk later confirmed that he had destroyed it "in 1983 or thereabouts" while witnessed by his supervisor, and under a 1982 court order to do so. Its parts were melted down in a foundry that produced manhole covers.

== Cultural depictions ==
Journalist Randy Shilts wrote a biography of Milk in 1982, The Mayor of Castro Street, which discussed the assassinations, trial and riots in detail. The 1984 documentary film The Times of Harvey Milk won the Academy Award for Best Documentary Feature.

Execution of Justice, a play by Emily Mann, chronicles the events leading to the assassinations. The play opened on Broadway in March 1986 and in 1999, it was adapted to film for cable network Showtime, with Tim Daly portraying White.

The Moscone–Milk assassinations and the trial of Dan White were lampooned by the Dead Kennedys with their re-written version of "I Fought the Law" which appeared in their 1987 compilation album Give Me Convenience or Give Me Death. The photo on the front cover of their 1980 album Fresh Fruit for Rotting Vegetables, which shows several police cars on fire, was taken during the White Night riots of May 21, 1979.

In 2003, the story of Milk's assassination and of the White Night Riot was featured in an exhibition created by the GLBT Historical Society, a San Francisco museum, archives and research center to which the estate of Scott Smith donated Milk's personal belongings that were preserved after his death. "Saint Harvey: The Life and Afterlife of a Modern Gay Martyr" was shown in the main gallery in the Society's former Mission Street location. The centerpiece was a section displaying the suit Milk was wearing at the time of his death. The suit is currently on display in the Society's permanent museum space in the Castro.

In 2008 the film Milk depicted the assassinations as part of a biographical story about the life of gay rights activist and politician Harvey Milk. The movie was a critical and commercial success, with Victor Garber portraying Moscone, Sean Penn playing Milk and Josh Brolin playing White. Penn won an Oscar for his performance and Brolin was nominated.

In January 2012, the Berkeley Repertory Theater premiered Ghost Light, a play exploring the effect of Moscone's assassination on his son Jonathan, who was 14 at the time of his father's death. The production was directed by Jonathan Moscone himself and written by Tony Taccone.

The 2024 documentary about Sally Gearhart, Sally, addresses the aftermath of the verdict, especially the White Night riots, and Gearhart's role in attempting to deescalate the violence.

== See also ==
- List of assassinated American politicians
- List of homicides in California
