= Jefferson E. Peyser =

American politician

Member of the California State Assembly from the 27th district
- In office January 7, 1935 – January 2, 1939
- Preceded by: B. J. Feigenbaum
- Succeeded by: Albert Charles Wollenberg

Personal details
- Born: November 14, 1899 Oakland, California
- Died: December 30, 1989 (aged 90)
- Party: Republican
- Spouse: Marguerite Kutner (m. 1928)

Military service
- Branch/service: United States Army
- Battles/wars: World War I

Jefferson E. Peyser (November 14, 1899 – December 30, 1989) served in the California State Assembly for the 27th district from 1935 to 1939. During World War I he served in the United States Army. He was a member of the San Francisco Board of Supervisors.

== Personal life ==
He was Jewish.
