= Don Horanzy =

American politician

Member of the San Francisco Board of Supervisors from the 8th district
- In office December 1978 – January 8, 1981
- Preceded by: Dan White
- Succeeded by: Constituency abolished

Personal details
- Born: Donald T. Horanzy
- Party: Democratic

Donald T. Horanzy was an American politician, real estate broker, and analyst. A member of the Democratic Party, he served on the San Francisco Board of Supervisors, being appointed to replace Dan White, who resigned due to financial problems. White notably assassinated Mayor George Moscone and fellow Supervisor Harvey Milk just an hour before Horanzy's appointment was to be announced.

== Career ==
Horanzy worked for the United States Department of Housing and Urban Development as a real estate loan officer.

Horanzy was a community activist and founded a volunteer organization called "All People's Coalition," which worked to combat crime and spruce up the neighborhoods of southern San Francisco. Despite never seeking public office previously, Mayor George Moscone sought to appoint Horanzy, a liberal who was considered moderate enough to win re-election, to the San Francisco Board of Supervisors. Horanzy was to replace Dan White, who resigned due to financial problems. White attempted to seek re-appointment to his old position, and Moscone's denial and intention to appoint Horanzy ultimately played a part in White assassinating Moscone and fellow Supervisor Harvey Milk just one hour before Moscone was to announce Horanzy's appointment at a press conference.

Moscone's replacement, Dianne Feinstein, announced Horanzy's appointment to replace White a couple of weeks after the assassination, calling the appointment "a simple act of justice."
