= Charles Albert Murdock =

American politician and printer

- Murdock c. 1909

Member of the California State Assembly from the 10th district
- In office January 8, 1883 – January 5, 1885
- Preceded by: Multi-member district
- Succeeded by: Robert Barnett

Personal details
- Born: January 26, 1841 Massachusetts, U.S.
- Died: January 10, 1928 (aged 86) San Francisco, California, U.S.
- Occupation: Printer, politician

Charles Albert Murdock (January 26, 1841 – January 10, 1928) was an American politician and printer. He was once a California State Representative, member of the Board of Education of San Francisco, Civil Service Commissioner, and member of the Board of Supervisors.

== Biography ==
Murdock was born 26 January 1841 in Massachusetts, and lived his earliest years in Boston. His father moved to California in 1849 and Murdock followed in 1855, the family reuniting in Humboldt County, California. By 1861 he was a correspondent for the Humboldt Times. In 1864 he moved to San Francisco. There he became successful in the printing business. His house was designed by architect and friend Ernest Coxhead. In 1906, after the 1906 San Francisco earthquake and fire, he had to sell out a majority interest in his printing business because of the destruction of the premises and equipment. He fully retired in 1915.

Although Murdock printed many routine jobs (he discusses printing an order of checks in his memoir), he is known today for the artistic quality of his best work. Examples of this are issues of a San Francisco literary periodical, The Lark, done in conjunction with Frank Gelett Burgess. Describing his work, Arion Press said, "Initially conservative, he became associated with the most adventuresome publications of the time..."

Murdock also became the printer of Emperor Norton's promissory notes between 1878 and Norton's death in 1880. The two had befriended one another at San Francisco's First Unitarian Church.

Printing was not Murdock's sole activity. He was a member of San Francisco's Chit-Chat Club, served on the Board of Education in San Francisco (1894–1896), a member of the California legislature, was civil service commissioner (1902–1903), and Supervisor of the City and County of San Francisco (1907–1916). He was also involved in numerous charitable causes.

Murdock met author Bret Harte in 1857 when he was 16 and Harte 21 and remained an acquaintance until around 1866. He devotes an entire chapter of his memoirs to Harte.

Murdock was involved with the Unitarian church his entire life. He was a follower of Thomas Starr King at the First Unitarian Church of San Francisco, and wrote a book about King's successor Horatio Stebbins. He edited the Pacific Unitarian.

Murdock died on 10 January 1928, aged 86. His death was lamented in, among other places, Publications of the Astronomical Society of the Pacific, of which he had been a member. Murdock described in his memoirs how delighted he was when one of his aunt's visited, because her husband John Downes, an astronomer associated with Harvard and later the Smithsonian Institution, fascinated them by trying to teach them some basics about astronomy.

== Works ==
- Murdock, Charles Albert (1885). A 16th century Christmas written for Pilgrim Sunday School, San Francisco.
- Murdock, Charles Albert (1902). Bret Harte in Humboldt. San Francisco: Overland Monthly. p. 301.
- Murdock, Charles Albert (26 Sep 1910). Joseph Hutchinson.
- Murdock, Charles Albert (1913). Fifty years of progress;: A memorial of the fiftieth anniversary of the establishment of the business of A. Brizard, inc., at Arcata, Humboldt County, California.
- Murdock, Charles Albert (1921). Horatio Stebbins, his ministry and his personality. Boston: Houghton Mifflin Company. "charles albert murdock."
- Murdock, Charles A. (1921). A Backward Glance at Eighty. San Francisco: Paul Elder and Company.
- More Borrowings. San Francisco: C. A. Murdock & Co., Printers. 1891. "charles albert murdock." (printer)
- Beasley, Thomas Dykes (1914). A Tramp Through the Bret Harte Country. San Francisco: Paul Elder and Company. "a tramp through the bret harte country." (authored foreword)
