= Ella Hill Hutch =

American politician

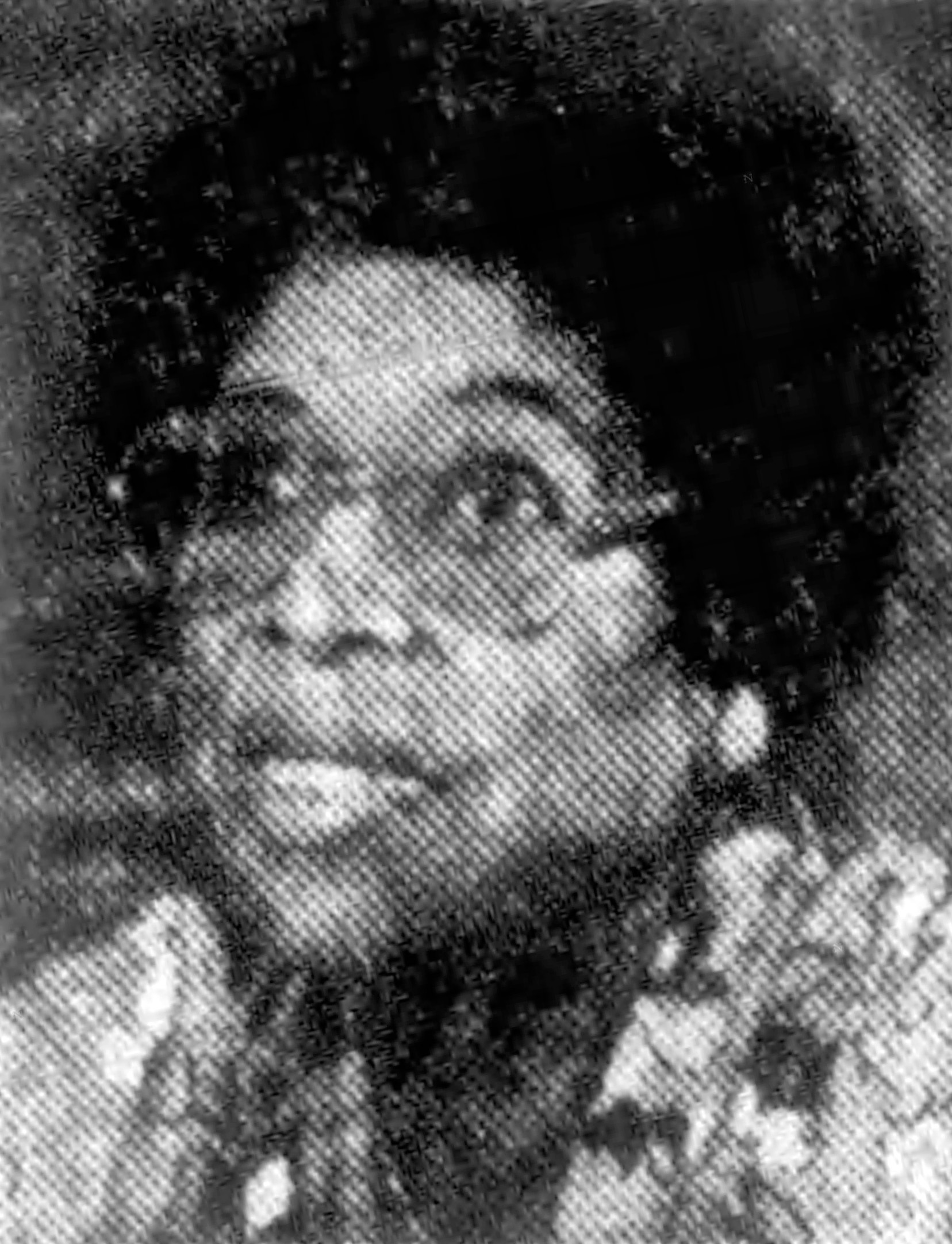
- Hutch in 1980

Member of the San Francisco Board of Supervisors
- In office January 8, 1978 – February 25, 1981
- Preceded by: District established
- Succeeded by: Willie B. Kennedy
- Constituency: 4th district (1978–1981); At-large district (1981)

Personal details
- Born: June 9, 1923 Lakeland, Florida, U.S.
- Died: February 25, 1981 (aged 57) San Francisco, California, U.S.
- Party: Democratic

Ella Hill Hutch (June 9, 1923 – February 25, 1981) was an American politician. She was elected to the San Francisco Board of Supervisors in San Francisco, California, in 1977 (along with Harvey Milk and Dan White) and reelected in 1980. She was the second African American elected to the Board (Terry Francois was the first, elected in 1967, 1971, and 1975), and the first African-American woman. Hutch took part in many offices before her service on the Board in 1977. She started her career among the International Longshore and Warehouse Union for 25 years, then branched off and became more politically active concerning policy and political issues within San Francisco. She took part in several councils and boards, including the Democratic County Central Committee in 1966, the Fillmore Tenants Council, the Bay Area Rapid Transit (BART) Board, and the Golden Gate Bridge, Highway and Transportation District. She took public office in 1977 as the member of the Board of Supervisors for District 4, and later citywide. She focused on government-financed housing and public transportation.

== Early life ==
Ella Hill Hutch was born in Lakeland, Florida in 1923. After World War II, Hutch decided to move to San Francisco, California. There, she joined the International Longshore and Warehouse Union during and worked as a secretary and switchboard operator for the union for the next twenty-five years. In 1960, Ella aligned herself with Bob Slattery to create the San Francisco Branch of CORE (Congress of Racial Equality).

== Public office ==
=== DCCC ===
Regarding public office, Ella held positions in many different committees. In 1966, she became a member of the Democratic County Central Committee, the governing body of the Democratic Party.

=== BART ===
In 1974, she became the first woman elected to the Board of Directors of the Bay Area Rapid Transit. She specifically dealt with the public transportation of the city. During this time, she also was a member of the Golden Gate Bridge, Highway and Transportation District. She was an active member in both Boards until 1977, when she was elected to the Board of Supervisors.

=== Supervisor ===
In the year of 1977, Ella Hill Hutch became the first African American woman (the second African American) elected to the San Francisco Branch of the Board of Supervisors. This election in 1977 was the first San Francisco election that used district-based, rather than at-large, elections for board of supervisors. Harvey Milk and Carol Ruth Silver were also elected to the board of supervisors in this election. Hutch was elected to represent District 4, and later she represented the city. Her campaign focused on low-income housing and transportation. She served in office from 1977 to 1981.

== Legacy ==
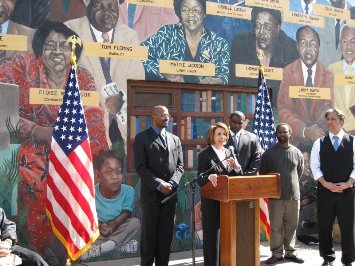
Congresswoman Nancy Pelosi standing in front of the Ella Hill Hutch Community Center.

=== Tribute ===
Ella Hill Hutch's time in office abruptly ended due to her early death of natural causes. Mayor Dianne M. Feinstein said, "She was a warm woman who cared very much about the city and its people." In tribute to the first African American female supervisor, a community center was built in San Francisco, California in her honor.
