= Get away with murder =

English idiom

Get away with murder is an English idiom, used to describe escaping the consequences of an action. While literally it refers to someone committing a murder and not being punished, it can be used figuratively of someone who is seen not to suffer the consequences of their actions: "I hate to see a mother who lets her children get away with murder".

It is unknown where and when the idiom originated from exactly, but is theorized to be from the British Isles sometime between 13th Century and 16th century.
