= Ralph McLeran =

American politician (c.1870–1928)

McLeran c. 1909

Ralph McLeran (born circa 1870; died August 21, 1928) was an American politician who served on the San Francisco Board of Supervisors for a two-year term starting in 1908 followed by three consecutive four-year terms starting in 1912.

== Career ==
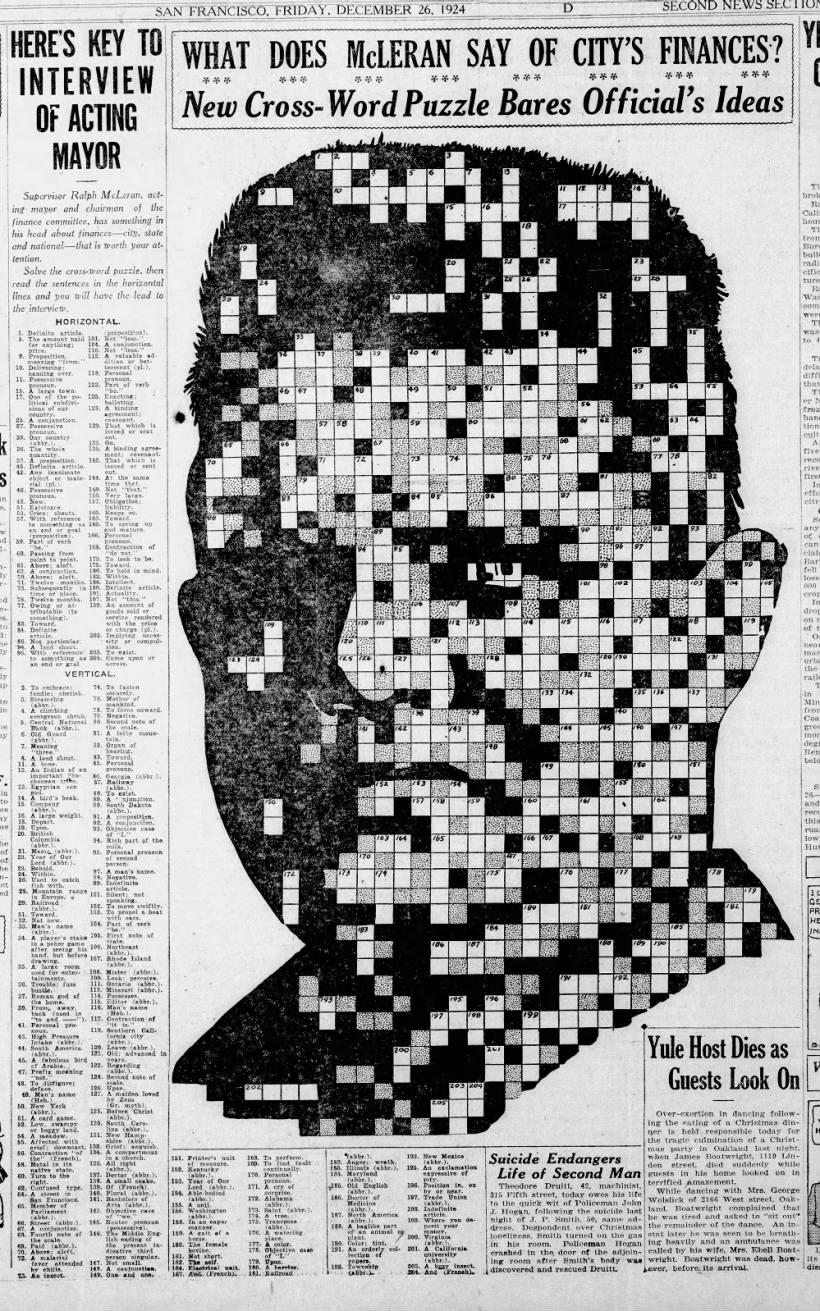
McLeran in crossword puzzle form

McLeran unsuccessfully sought the Democratic nomination for mayor of San Francisco in 1909. He was acting mayor of that city repeatedly from 1918 through at last 1924 when Mayor James Rolph was traveling. There was a movement to run him for mayor in 1923, but he did not endorse the challenge. He lost his reelection campaign for Supervisor in 1925, and put himself back in the running in 1927 but refused to campaign.

McLaren was also head of the construction firm R. McLeran & Co. His construction career started in 15 when he became a carpenter's apprentice. He spent time as an independent contractor in Alaska before moving to San Francisco, where he both built his business and acquired real estate.
