= Willie B. Kennedy =

American politician (1923–2013)

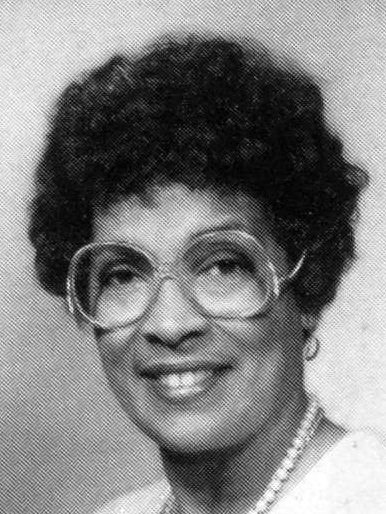
- Kennedy in 1987

Member of the Bay Area Rapid Transit Board of Directors for the 7th district
- In office August 9, 1996 – January 31, 2003

Member of the San Francisco Board of Supervisors for the at-large district
- In office March 6, 1981 – May 31, 1996
- Preceded by: Ella Hill Hutch
- Succeeded by: Leslie Rachel Katz

Personal details
- Born: November 5, 1923 Terrell, Texas, U.S.
- Died: June 28, 2013 (aged 89) San Francisco, California, U.S.
- Party: Democratic
- Education: City College of San Francisco; San Francisco State University

Willie B. Kennedy (November 5, 1923 – June 28, 2013) was a member of the San Francisco Board of Supervisors.

== Early life and education ==
Kennedy was born and raised in Terrell, Texas and attended high school in Dallas, Texas, graduating in 1941. She moved to San Francisco where she graduated from City College and San Francisco State University.

== Political career ==
Mayor Dianne Feinstein nominated Kennedy to the San Francisco Human Rights Commission and to the Redevelopment Agency Commission. When Supervisor Ella Hill Hutch died in office in 1981, Feinstein appointed Kennedy to fill the vacant seat on the Board of Supervisors. She was subsequently re-elected to three four-year terms. During her 15 years on the board, Kennedy was a "powerful advocate for women and minority-owned businesses." She co-authored legislation that banned the city from doing business with South Africa, which was then governed by the apartheid National Party. She also worked to see the development of Bayview-Hunters Point neighborhood improvements. She left the Board of Supervisors in May 1996.

After leaving the board of supervisors, Kennedy was appointed to the Bay Area Rapid Transit (BART) board of directors, eventually becoming president of the board.

== Personal life ==
Kennedy was twice married. She married her first husband, Paul L. Hooey, in 1941. They had one daughter. After their divorce, she moved to San Francisco with her daughter. There she met and married (in 1955) her second husband, the civil rights activist, Joseph G. Kennedy. They remained married until his death in 1979.

Kennedy was a member of the Gamma Phi Delta, a service organization for African-American women. She was co-founder of the Gamma Phi Delta Foundation, the philanthropic arm of the sorority, that provides scholarships for youth and funded after-school programs.

Kennedy died on June 28, 2013, age 89, from a heart attack.
