= Dan White =

American politician and assassin (1946–1985)

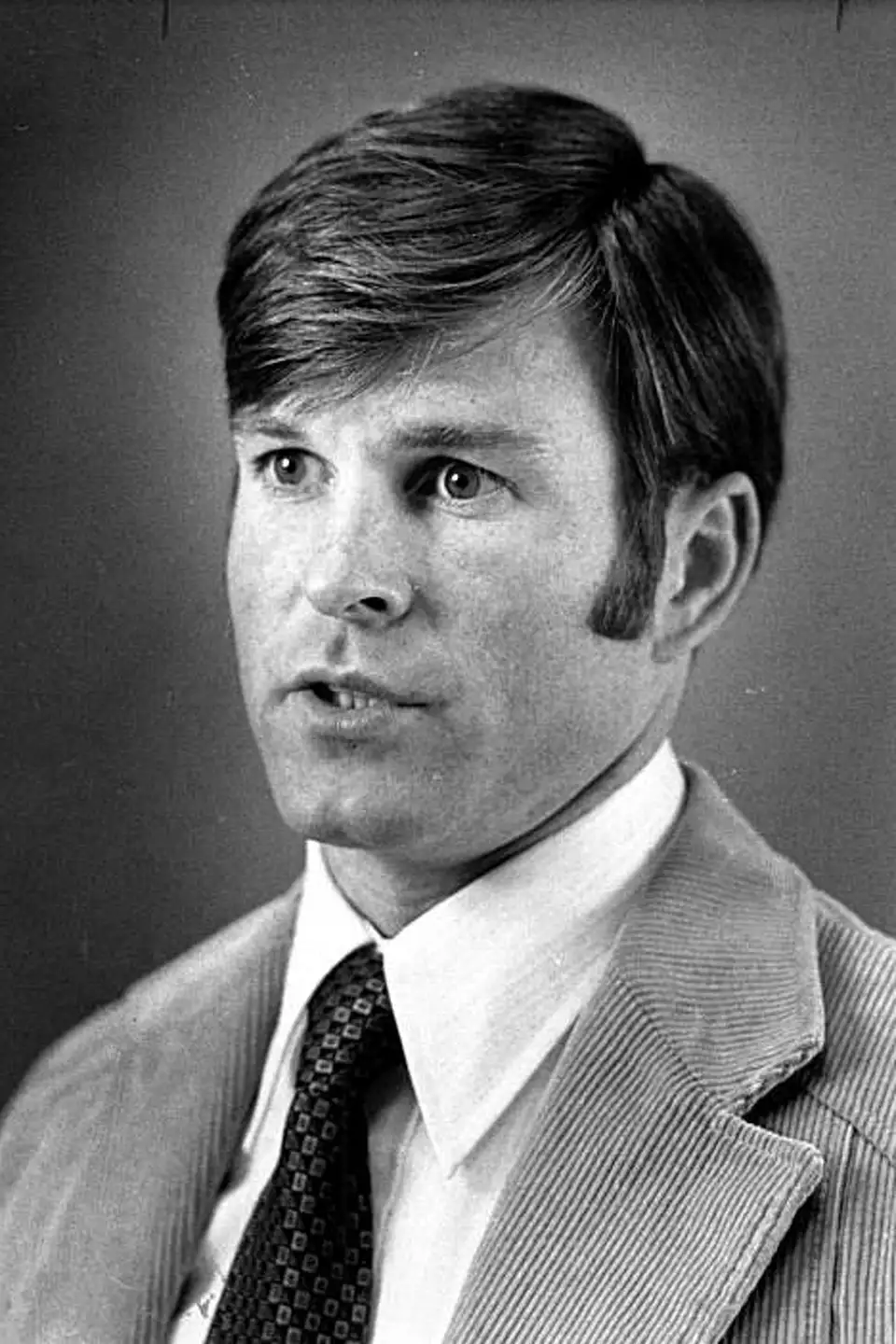
- White c. 1977
- Born: Daniel James White; September 2, 1946; Long Beach, California, U.S.
- Died: October 21, 1985 (aged 39); San Francisco, California, U.S.
- Cause of death: Suicide by carbon monoxide poisoning
- Resting place: Golden Gate National Cemetery
- Political party: Democratic
- Spouse: Mary Ann (m. 1976)
- Conviction: Voluntary manslaughter (2 counts)
- Penalty: 7 years and 8 months imprisonment (released after 5 years)

Details
- Victims: George Moscone, 49; Harvey Milk, 48
- Country: United States
- State: California
- Killed: 2
- Weapon: Smith & Wesson Model 36
- Date apprehended: November 27, 1978

Member of the San Francisco Board of Supervisors from the 8th district
- In office January 8, 1978 – November 10, 1978
- Preceded by: Constituency established
- Succeeded by: Don Horanzy

Personal details
- Children: 3

Military service
- Allegiance: United States
- Branch/service: United States Army
- Years of service: 1965–1971
- Rank: Sergeant
- Unit: 101st Airborne Division
- Battles/wars: Vietnam War

Daniel James White (September 2, 1946 – October 21, 1985) was an American politician who assassinated George Moscone, the 37th mayor of San Francisco, and Harvey Milk, a fellow member of the San Francisco Board of Supervisors, inside San Francisco City Hall on November 27, 1978.

During trial his lawyers argued, controversially, that White did not have the mental capacity required to be found guilty of murder, due to his depression as evidenced by his consumption of junk food.

White was convicted, not of murder, but on two counts of voluntary manslaughter and served five years of a seven-year and eight-month prison sentence. Less than two years after his release, he returned to San Francisco and later died by suicide.

== Early life ==
Dan White was born in Long Beach, California, on September 2, 1946, the second of nine children in a working-class Catholic Irish-American family. He grew up in the Visitacion Valley neighborhood of San Francisco and attended Archbishop Riordan High School, until he was expelled for violence. He went on to attend Woodrow Wilson High School.

== Career ==
White enlisted in the United States Army in June 1965. Between 1969 and 1970, he served as a sergeant in the 101st Airborne Division during the Vietnam War. He was honorably discharged in 1971.

Following a stint as a security guard at A. J. Dimond High School in Anchorage, Alaska, White returned to San Francisco and joined the San Francisco Police Department (SFPD). According to a SF Weekly newspaper account, he allegedly quit the force after reporting another officer for beating a handcuffed suspect. White then joined the San Francisco Fire Department, in which he rescued a woman and her baby from a seventh-floor apartment. The city's newspapers referred to him as "an all-American boy".

=== Election as supervisor ===
In 1977, White was elected to the San Francisco Board of Supervisors from District 8, which included several neighborhoods near the southeastern boundaries of San Francisco. For the 1977 election, supervisors were elected by district and not "at-large". This was a new development for San Francisco politics. In January 1978, White was interviewed by reporter Jerry Burns on Channel 6 in San Francisco, and was asked his opinion on the new districting system. White responded, saying that San Franciscans wanted the new system, because it promoted "togetherness" between members of the Board. The Board would revert to "at-large" elections in the 1980s and 1990s before returning to the districting system it uses today.

White, a Democrat, was often labelled as a conservative within the party, due in large part to his experience in the military and law enforcement, and due to endorsements White received from police and firefighter unions. His district was described by The New York Times as "a largely white, middle-class section that is hostile to the growing homosexual community of San Francisco."

The Times stated that as a supervisor, White saw himself as the board's "defender of the home, the family and religious life against homosexuals, pot smokers and cynics". In a 1977 campaign brochure he wrote, "I am not going to be forced out of San Francisco by splinter groups of radicals, social deviates, and incorrigibles... There are thousands upon thousands of frustrated, angry people such as yourself, waiting to unleash a fury that can and will eradicate the malignancies which blight our city."

=== Tenure as supervisor ===
Despite their personal differences, White and Harvey Milk, who was elected to the San Francisco Board of Supervisors and was the first openly gay officeholder in California history, had several areas of political agreement and initially worked well together. Milk was one of three people from City Hall invited to the baptism of White's newborn child shortly after the 1977 election. White also persuaded Dianne Feinstein, then president of the Board of Supervisors, to appoint Milk chairman of the Streets and Transportation Committee.

In April 1978, the Roman Catholic Church proposed a facility in White's district for juvenile offenders who had committed murder, arson, rape and other crimes, to be operated by the Sisters of the Good Shepherd. White strongly opposed the facility, while Milk supported it, and their difference of opinion led to a conflict between the two.

By the end of his tenure, White held a mixed record on gay rights. He opposed California Proposition 6 of 1978, the Briggs Initiative, which sought to ban gay men and lesbians from working in California's public schools and would have required the termination of any public education employee who spoke positively about homosexuality in any context. Yet, White also voted against an ordinance prohibiting discrimination against gays in housing and employment, an ordinance championed by Milk.

== Assassinations of Moscone and Milk ==
Following a disagreement over a proposed drug rehabilitation center in the Mission District, White frequently clashed with Milk, as well as other members of the board. On November 10, 1978, White resigned his seat as supervisor. The reasons he cited were his dissatisfaction with what he saw as the corrupt practices of San Francisco politics, as well as the difficulty of earning a living without a police officer's or firefighter's salary, jobs he could not retain legally while serving as a supervisor. White had opened a baked potato stand at Pier 39, which failed to become profitable. He reversed his resignation on November 14, after his supporters lobbied him to seek reappointment from Mayor George Moscone. Moscone initially agreed to White's request, but later refused the appointment at the urging of Milk and others.

On November 27, 1978, White visited City Hall with the later-declared intention of killing not only Moscone and Milk, but also two other San Francisco politicians, Speaker of the California State Assembly Willie Brown (who would later serve as mayor) and Supervisor Carol Ruth Silver, whom he also blamed for lobbying Moscone not to reappoint him. White climbed through a basement window carrying a Smith & Wesson Model 36 revolver and 10 rounds of ammunition. By entering the building through the window, White managed to avoid the recently installed metal detectors. After entering Moscone's office, White pleaded to be reinstated as supervisor. When Moscone refused, White shot him in the shoulder, the chest, and twice in the head. He then walked to Milk's office, reloaded the gun and fatally shot Milk five times, firing the final two shots with the gun's barrel touching Milk's skull. White then fled City Hall, surrendering to the police at Northern Police Station, where he had formerly been a police officer. While being interviewed, White recorded a tearful confession, stating, "I just shot him."

=== Trial and "Twinkie defense" ===
At trial, White's defense team argued that his mental state at the time of the murders was one of diminished capacity due to depression. They argued that he was therefore not capable of premeditating the murders, and thus was not legally guilty of first-degree murder. Forensic psychiatrist Martin Blinder testified that White exhibited several behavioral symptoms of depression, including the fact that White had gone from being highly health-conscious to consuming sugary foods and drinks. Area newspapers quickly dubbed it the Twinkie defense. When the prosecution played a recording of White's confession, several jurors wept as they listened to what was described as "a man pushed beyond his endurance". An acquaintance of White's, who knew him from the SFPD, claimed that several officials carried weapons at this time and speculated that White carried the extra ammunition as a habit that police officers had.

During the trial, the defense and prosecution presented competing psychiatric testimony about White's mental condition. Defense psychiatrists argued that his depression affected his ability to premeditate and deliberate, while the prosecution's psychiatrist testified that he found no evidence that White lacked those abilities. The defense also presented testimony about White's financial and family pressures. After approximately 36 hours of deliberation, the jury found White guilty of voluntary manslaughter rather than murder on May 21, 1979, and sentenced to seven years imprisonment.

The verdict led to widespread public outrage and protests in San Francisco. Outrage within San Francisco's gay community over the sentence sparked the city's White Night riots. While most were outraged at the murders, some sympathized with White's actions, as Milk's status as an openly gay individual made him a target for homophobia and anger which fostered support for his killer, reflecting a greater political trend of acts of violence being supported by hateful ideologies at the time.Despite this complicated political environment, general disdain for the verdict led to the elimination of California's "diminished capacity" law. In June 1979, psychiatrist Thomas Szasz, a critic of forensic psychiatry, gave a speech to a large audience in San Francisco calling the verdict a "travesty of justice," which he blamed on the diminished capacity defense.

The verdict also sparked outrage and emotional reactions outside of San Francisco's gay community. In BBC's "a letter from America" journalist Alistair Cooke recounts actions that followed the white night riots, including an honorary ceremony in which approx 3,000 people gathered to mourn and celebrate what would have been Milk's 49th birthday. This public display of honor demonstrates how deeply the murder shook the city and all it's different demographics of peoples.

=== Alleged confession ===
In 1998, Frank Falzon, the SFPD homicide inspector to whom White had surrendered after the murders, said that he met with White in 1984, and that at this meeting White had confessed his intention to kill Brown and Silver along with Moscone and Milk. Falzon quoted White as having said, "I was on a mission. I wanted four of them. Carol Ruth Silver, she was the biggest snake ... and Willie Brown, he was masterminding the whole thing." Falzon indicated that he believed White, stating, "I felt like I had been hit by a sledge-hammer... I found out it was a premeditated murder."

== Imprisonment and parole ==
White served five years of his seven-year sentence at Soledad State Prison and was paroled on January 7, 1984. Fearing he might be murdered in retaliation for his crimes, authorities secretly transported him to Los Angeles, where he served a year's parole. At the completion of his parole, White sought to return to San Francisco; Feinstein, by now elected mayor, urged him not to return on the basis that doing so would jeopardize public safety. Joel Wachs, a member of the Los Angeles City Council, also argued to keep White out of Los Angeles. White eventually did move back to San Francisco, where he lived with his wife and children.

== Suicide ==
On October 21, 1985, less than two years after his release, White died by suicide in his garage from carbon monoxide poisoning. He is buried at Golden Gate National Cemetery in San Bruno, with a traditional government-furnished headstone issued for war veterans. He was survived by his two sons, his daughter and his widow.

== Media adaptations ==
The story of the assassinations is told in the Academy Award-winning documentary film The Times of Harvey Milk (1984), which was released a year before White died by suicide.

The American hardcore punk rock band Dead Kennedys altered the lyrics to the song "I Fought The Law" to tell the story of the assassinations in White's voice, criticizing the leniency of the verdict and sentencing as resulting from White's status as a retired cop.

The experimental new wave band Tuxedomoon wrote the song (Special Treatment For The) Family Man about the extenuation of this crime.

The Law & Order episode "Pride" is inspired by White's assassination of Harvey Milk. The killer in the episode is a police officer turned politician who murders a gay colleague whom he blames for his faltering career.

White was portrayed by Josh Brolin in the 2008 film Milk. The film depicted White from his first meeting with Milk up to and including Milk's death. Brolin was nominated for the Academy Award for Best Supporting Actor, one of eight nominations the film received overall.

White's life, the assassinations, and his trial are covered in the 1984 book Double Play: The San Francisco City Hall Killings by Mike Weiss, which won the Edgar Award as Best True Crime Book of the Year. An expanded second edition, Double Play: The Hidden Passions Behind the Double Assassination of George Moscone and Harvey Milk, was issued in 2010 and updated White's story to include his life after prison and his suicide. The second edition also includes a DVD with a half-hour video interview with White.

Execution of Justice, a play by Emily Mann, chronicles the events leading to the assassinations. In 1999, the play was adapted to film for cable network Showtime, with Tim Daly portraying White.

Harvey Milk is an opera in three acts composed by Stewart Wallace to a libretto by Michael Korie. A joint commission by Houston Grand Opera, New York City Opera, and San Francisco Opera, it premiered on January 21, 1995, at Houston Grand Opera.
