= Gordon Lau =

American politician

- 劉貴明
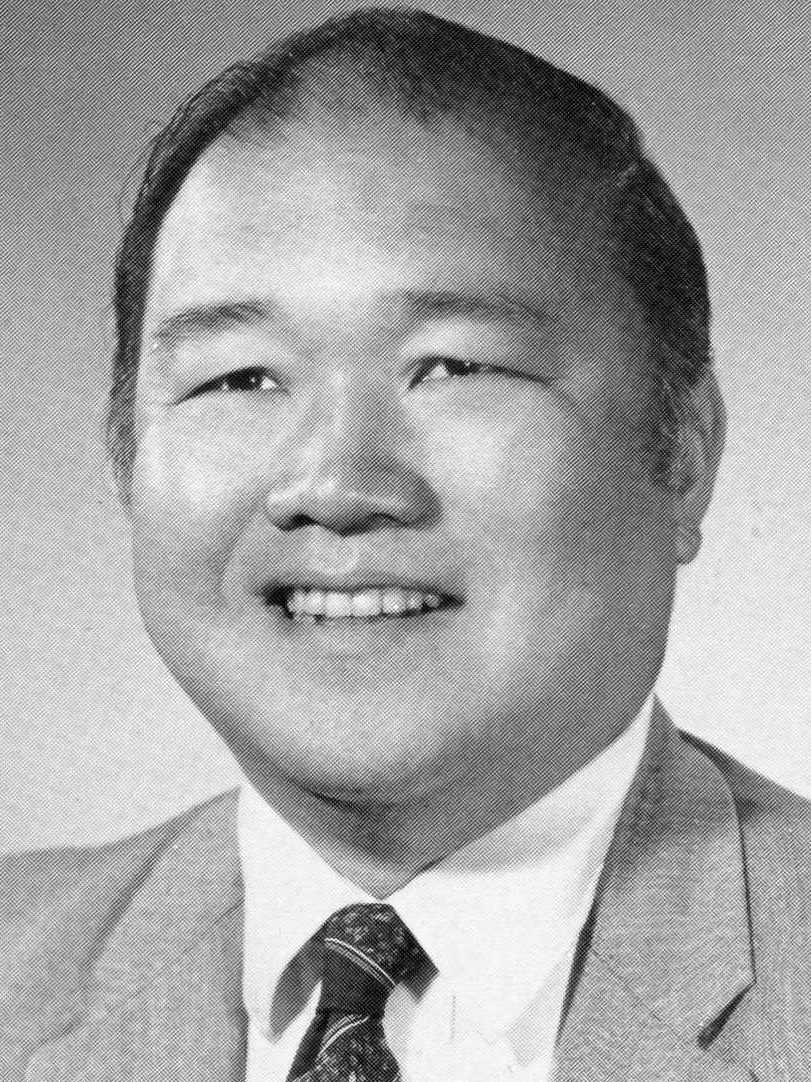
- Lau in 1987

Member of the San Francisco Board of Supervisors
- In office September 9, 1977 – January 8, 1980
- Preceded by: Robert H. Mendelsohn
- Succeeded by: Ed Lawson
- Constituency: At-large district (1977–1978); 1st district (1978–1980)

Personal details
- Born: August 22, 1941 Honolulu, Hawaii, United States
- Died: April 20, 1998 (aged 56) San Francisco, California, United States
- Education: University of San Francisco

Chinese name
- Traditional Chinese: 劉貴明
- Simplified Chinese: 刘贵明
- Hanyu Pinyin: Liú Guìmíng
- Jyutping: Lau4 Gwai3-ming4
Transcriptions
Standard Mandarin
- Hanyu Pinyin: Liú Guìmíng
- Wade–Giles: Liu^{2} Kuei^{4}-ming^{2}
Yue: Cantonese
- Jyutping: Lau4 Gwai3-ming4

Gordon J. Lau (August 22, 1941 – April 20, 1998) was the first Chinese American elected to the San Francisco Board of Supervisors in San Francisco, California. He was elected to the city board of supervisors under Mayor George Moscone in 1977.

== Early life ==
Lau was born in Honolulu, Hawaii and moved with his parents to San Francisco when he was 11 years old. He attended elementary school at St. Mary's, graduated from St. Ignatius High School and went on to attend University of San Francisco, earning bachelor's and law degrees.

== Career ==
Lau was an activist for the city's Asian American community. He was initially appointed in 1977 by Moscone to the Board of Supervisors, but won the subsequent election and served until he was defeated in the 1979 election.

Lau died on April 20, 1998 at St. Mary's Hospital (now UCSF Health Stanyan Hospital) in San Francisco.

== Legacy ==
Gordon J. Lau Elementary School in Chinatown is named in his honor. Before it was renamed to honor Lau, it was originally known as the Oriental Public School until 1924, and Commodore Stockton Elementary School between 1924 and 1998.
