= 2026 San Francisco Measure D =

- June 2, 2026
- Increases to Business Tax Based on Comparison of Top Executive's Pay to Employees' Pay Measure

Results
Choice	Votes	%
Yes	118,802	47.19%
No	132,959	52.81%
Valid votes	251,761	92.75%
Invalid or blank votes	19,694	7.25%
Total votes	271,455	100.00%
Registered voters/turnout	533,546	50.88%

Yes
60%–70%
50%–60%
No
80%–90%
70%–80%
60%–70%
50%–60%

Measure D, (Note: Also referred to as Proposition D.) colloquially known as the overpaid CEO tax or overpaid CEO act, was an initiative that appeared on the June 2, 2026, ballot in San Francisco, California. The measure aimed to change the top executive pay tax that the city collects from some large businesses when their highest-paid managerial employee earns more than 100 times the median compensation paid to other employees.

The measure also sought to increase the top executive pay tax rates and introduce a voter approval requirement for future changes to the tax rates. It failed, with a narrow majority of voters opposing the changes.

== Background and impact ==
Labor coalition Stand Up for SF submitted the initiative to the San Francisco city attorney in November 2025, framing it as a solution to Donald Trump's restrictions and cuts to Medicaid.

Local union SEIU 2015, a member of Stand Up for SF, stated that the proposed changes would only affect companies with at least 1,000 employees and more than US$1 billion in revenue, whose CEOs earn one hundred times the median salary of their employees. Stand Up for SF claimed that the initiative would generate more than US$200 million a year to support health care services in the city.

City controller Greg Wagner produced a similar estimate, asserting that from 2027, the overpaid CEO tax would generate $250 million to $300 million in new revenue for San Francisco's general fund, though he also warned of "potential risk of business relocation" if the measure passed. In May 2026, San Francisco chief economist Ted Egan released an analysis of Measure D, warning that the initiative would hurt the city's economy and result in more than 900 job losses.

== Endorsements ==
=== Support ===
Supporters of Measure D included prominent Democratic gubernatorial candidates, such as billionaire Tom Steyer and former U.S. representative Katie Porter. The initiative was endorsed by U.S. senator Bernie Sanders, who said that the tax rate increase "will make ... corporations pay their fair share", as well as a supermajority of the San Francisco Board of Supervisors and state assemblymember Matt Haney.

Yes

U.S. senators

- Bernie Sanders, Vermont (2007–present) (Independent)

U.S. representatives

- Nancy Pelosi, former speaker of the House (2007–2011, 2019–2023) from CA-11 (1987–present) (Democratic)
- Katie Porter, former CA-47 (2019–2025) (Democratic)
- Eric Swalwell, former CA-14 (2013–2026) (Democratic)

Statewide officials

- Tony Thurmond, superintendent of public instruction of California (2019–present) (Democratic)
- Betty Yee, former controller of California (2015–2023) (Democratic)

State legislators

- Matt Haney, AD-17 (2022–present) (Democratic)

Local officials

- Connie Chan, supervisor from the 1st district (2021–present) (Democratic)
- Chyanne Chen, supervisor from the 11th district (2025–present) (Democratic)
- Jackie Fielder, supervisor from the 9th district (2025–present) (Democratic)
- Myrna Melgar, supervisor from the 7th district (2021–present) (Democratic)
- Bilal Mahmood, supervisor from the 5th district (2025–present) (Democratic)
- Dean Preston, former supervisor from the 5th district (2019–2025) (Democratic)
- Danny Sauter, supervisor from the 3rd district (2025–present) (Democratic)
- Shamann Walton, supervisor from the 10th district (2019–present) (Democratic)
- Alan Wong, supervisor from the 4th district (2025–present) (Democratic)

Individuals

- Saikat Chakrabarti, political advisor (Democratic)
- Tom Steyer, businessman (Democratic)

Labor unions

- AFSCME Local 3299
- American Federation of Teachers Local 2121
- IAFF Local 798
- International Brotherhood of Teamsters California
- IFPTE Local 21
- National Union of Healthcare Workers
- San Francisco Building & Construction Trades Council
- San Francisco Labor Council
- SEIU Locals 2015 and 1021
- Teamsters Joint Council 7
- United Auto Workers Region 6
- United Educators of San Francisco
- UNITE HERE Local 2

Organizations

- Chinese Progressive Association
- Harvey Milk LGBTQ Democratic Club
- Indivisible San Francisco
- League of Women Voters of San Francisco

Political parties

- San Francisco Green Party

Newspapers

- San Francisco Bay Guardian

=== Opposition ===
San Francisco mayor Daniel Lurie, a moderate Democrat, publicly opposed the measure. Speaking to the San Francisco Chronicle, Lurie stated that the measure was "not the right path for [San Francisco] at this time" and would "send the wrong message to businesses". State senator Scott Wiener endorsed against the measure for similar reasons, warning that it would harm San Francisco's economic recovery after the COVID-19 pandemic. After Wiener expressed his opposition to the initiative, labor union SEIU California rescinded their support for his congressional campaign to succeed Nancy Pelosi.

In April 2026, the San Francisco Democratic County Central Committee voted to oppose the overpaid CEO tax in a 14-17 endorsement vote. The San Francisco Republican Party also endorsed against the initiative.

By April 2026, opposition groups had collected millions of dollars from corporations and businesses, including Uber, Williams Sonoma, PG&E, Google, and Amazon. At one point, over half of the funds raised by opposition groups had come from a small contingent of billionaire donors. In May 2026, the editorial board of the San Francisco Chronicle publicly opposed Measure D, asserting that residents would end up paying more taxes if the initiative passed. Both the Bay Area Reporter and the San Francisco Examiner endorsed against the initiative for similar reasons.

No

State legislators

- Catherine Stefani, AD-19 (2024–present) (Democratic)
- Scott Wiener, SD-11 (2016–present) (Democratic)

Local officials

- Matt Dorsey, supervisor from the 6th district (2022–present) (Democratic)
- Daniel Lurie, mayor of San Francisco (2025–present) (Democratic)
- Rafael Mandelman, president of the Board of Supervisors (2025–present) from the 8th district (2018–present) (Democratic)
- Libby Schaaf, former mayor of Oakland (2015–2023) (Democratic)
- Stephen Sherrill, supervisor from the 2nd district (2024–present) (Democratic)

Individuals

- Chris Larsen, business executive
- Garry Tan, venture capitalist (Democratic)

Organizations

- Alice B. Toklas LGBTQ Democratic Club
- Blueprint SF
- GrowSF
- Neighbors for a Better San Francisco
- San Francisco Chamber of Commerce
- San Francisco Bay Area Planning and Urban Research Association
- sf.citi

Political parties

- San Francisco Democratic County Central Committee
- San Francisco Republican Party

Newspapers

- Bay Area Reporter
- San Francisco Chronicle
- San Francisco Examiner

== Results ==
2026 San Francisco Measure D
Choice	Votes	%
For	118,802	47.19
Against	132,959	52.81
Total	251,761	100.00
Valid votes	251,761	92.75
Invalid/blank votes	19,694	7.25
Total votes	271,455	100.00
Registered voters/turnout	533,546	50.88
