= 2024 San Francisco Board of Supervisors election =

- November 5, 2024

6 of the 11 seats of the San Francisco Board of Supervisors
	Majority party
Party	Democratic
Seats before	11
Seats won	6
Seats after	11
Seat change	Steady
President before election
Aaron Peskin
Elected President
Rafael Mandelman

The 2024 San Francisco Board of Supervisors elections were held on November 5, 2024. Six of the eleven seats on the San Francisco Board of Supervisors were up for election. The election was conducted with ranked-choice voting.

== District 1 ==
San Francisco's 1st supervisorial district election
- November 5, 2024
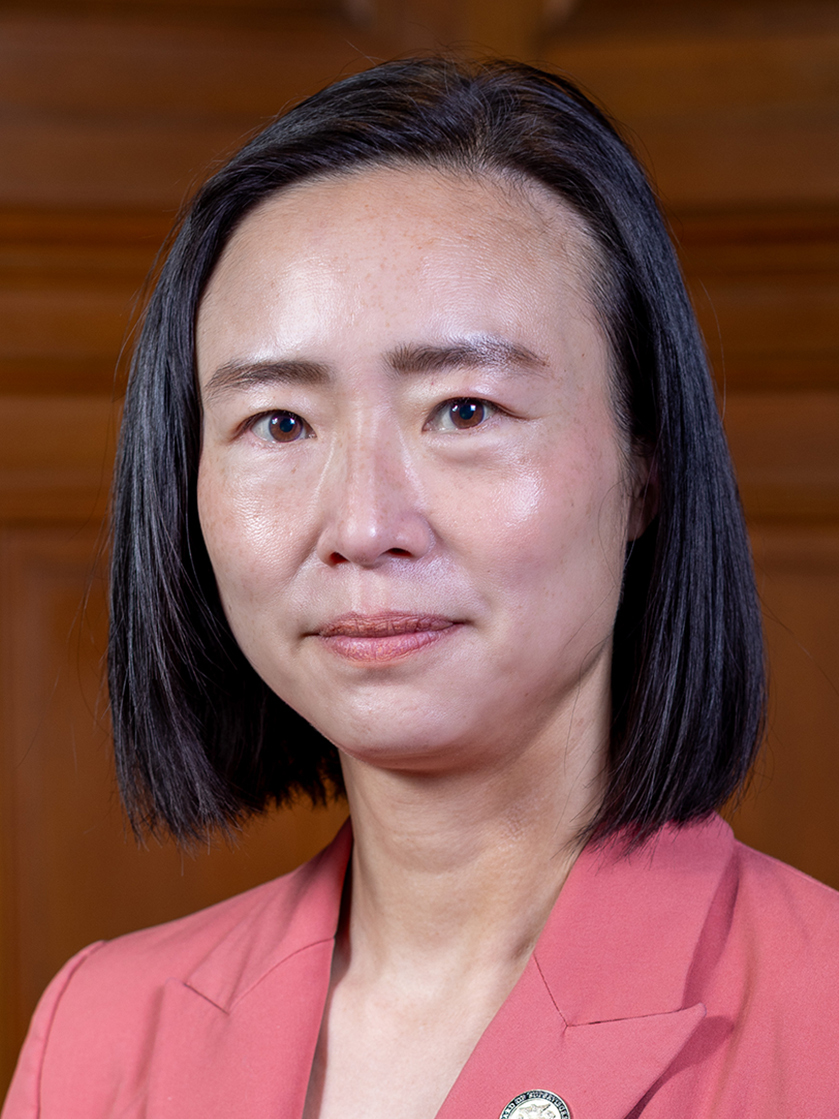

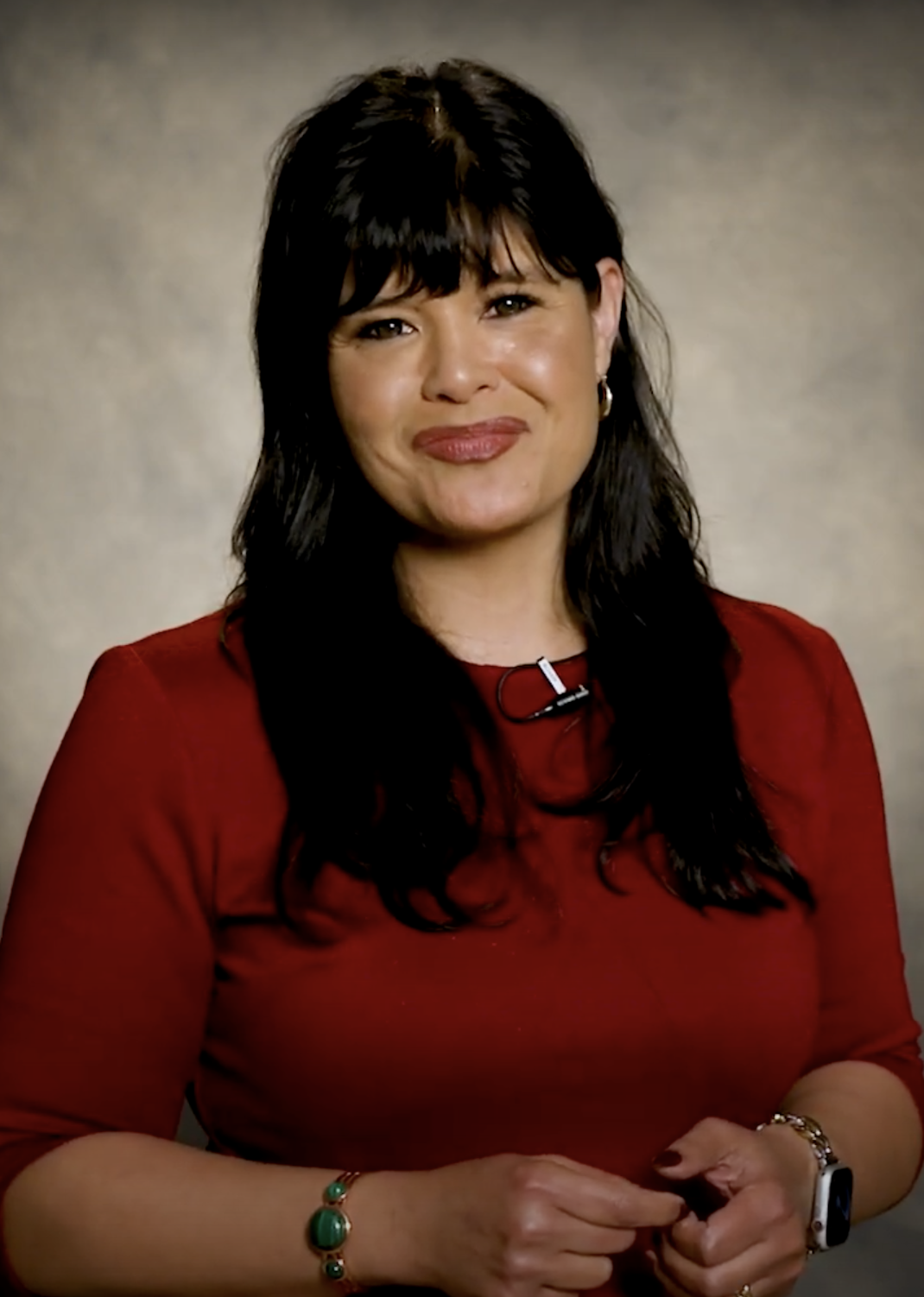

Candidate	Connie Chan	Marjan Philhour	Jen Nossokoff
First round	16,670; 46.99%	14,755; 41.59%	1,810; 5.10%
Maximum round	17,800; 51.90%	16,499; 48.10%	Eliminated
Supervisor before election
Connie Chan
Elected Supervisor
Connie Chan

Incumbent Supervisor Connie Chan ran for reelection. The district includes the Richmond District.

=== Candidates ===
- Jeremiah Boehner, entrepreneur
- Connie Chan, incumbent supervisor
- Sherman D'Silva, business owner and perennial candidate
- Jen Nossokoff, physician assistant
- Marjan Philhour, business owner and candidate for this district in 2016 and 2020

=== Endorsements ===
Jeremiah Boehner

Political parties

- San Francisco Republican Party
Connie Chan

U.S. representatives

- Nancy Pelosi, former Speaker of the House (2007–2011, 2019–2023) from CA-11 (1987–present)

Political parties

- California Working Families Party

Newspapers

- Bay Area Reporter
Marjoun Philhour

Political parties

- San Francisco Democratic Party

=== Results ===
District 1 supervisorial election, 2024
Candidate	Votes	%
Connie Chan (incumbent)	16,670	46.99
Marjan Philhour	14,755	41.59
Jen Nossokoff	1,810	5.10
Jeremiah Boehner	1,344	3.79
Sherman D'Silva	899	2.53
Total votes	35,478	100.00
Ranked choice voting — Pass 4
Connie Chan (incumbent)	17,800	51.90
Marjan Philhour	16,499	48.10
Exhausted votes	1,172	3.30%
Total votes	34,299	100.00

== District 3 ==
San Francisco's 3rd supervisorial district election
- November 5, 2024
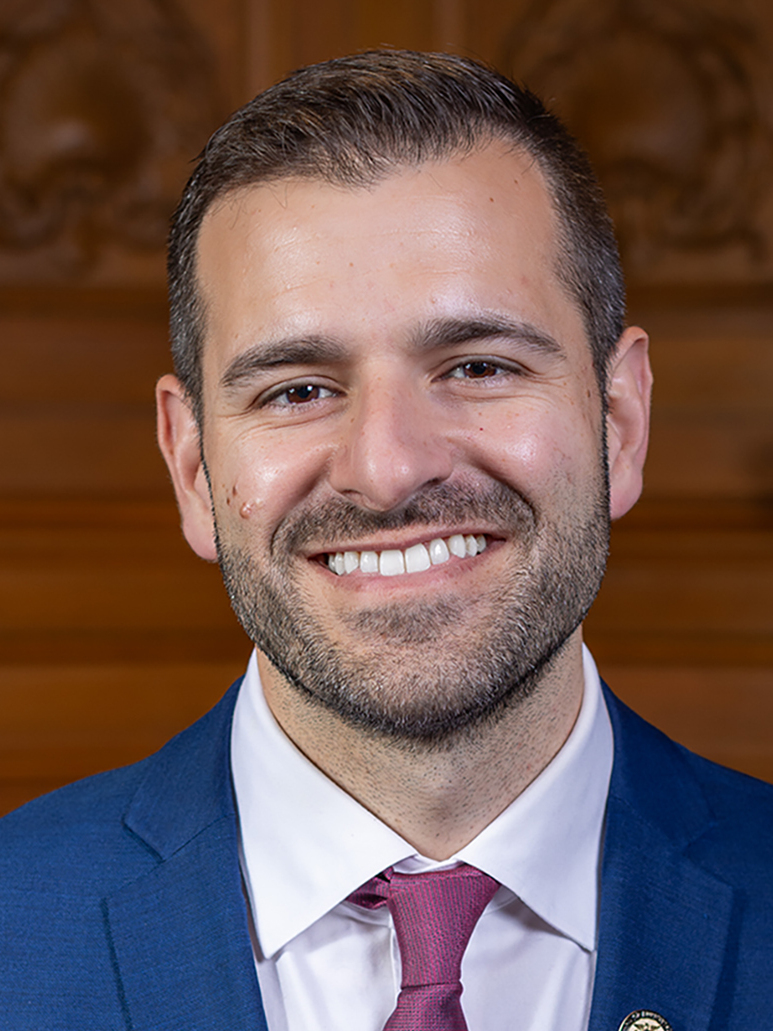

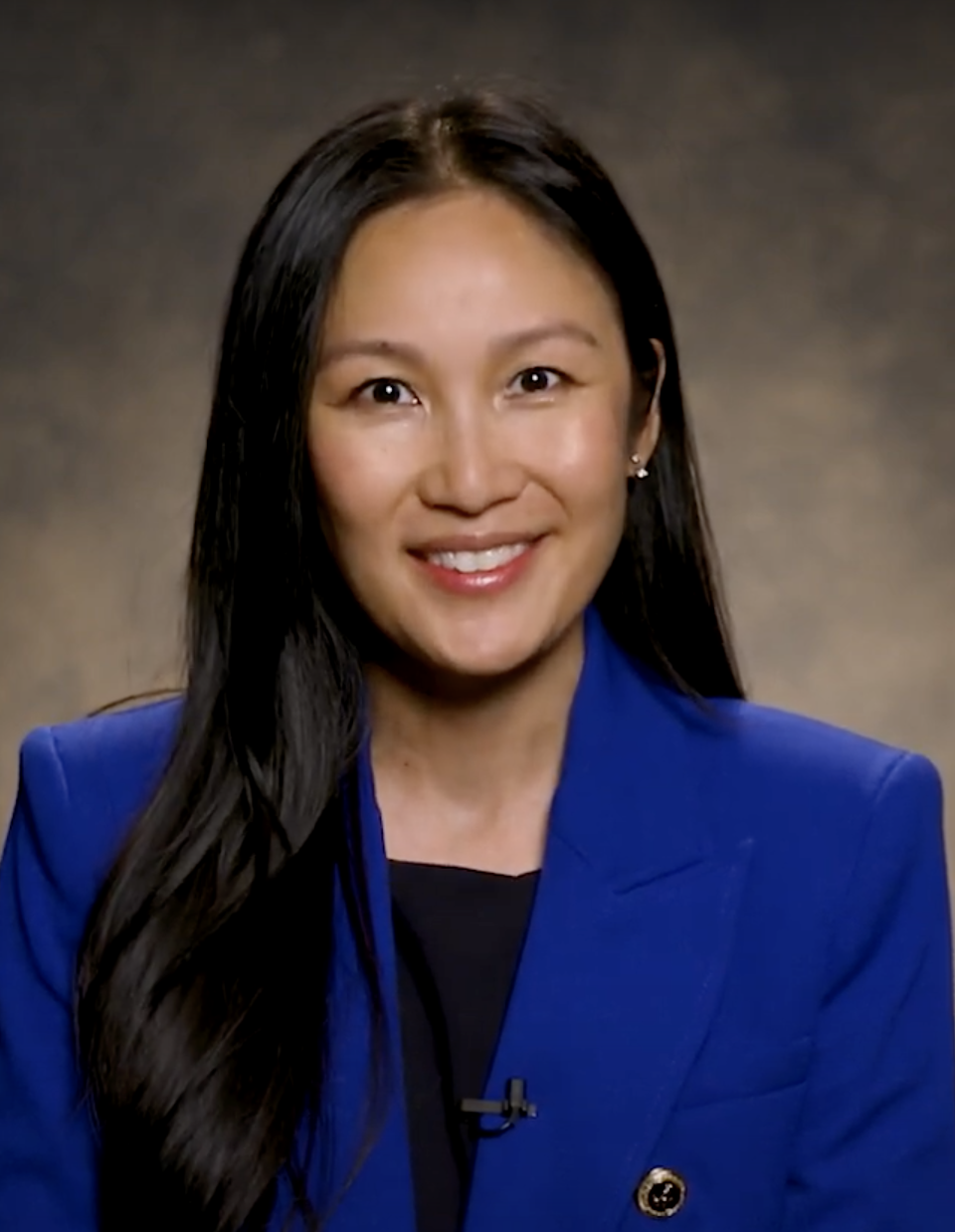

Candidate	Danny Sauter	Sharon Lai	Moe Jamil
First round	11,272; 39.20%	8,489; 29.52%	3,753; 13.05%
Maximum round	14,056; 54.97%	11,512; 45.03%	Eliminated
Candidate	Matthew Susk	Wendy Ha Chau
First round	2,800; 9.74%	1,565; 5.44%
Maximum round	Eliminated	Eliminated
Supervisor before election
Aaron Peskin
Elected Supervisor
Danny Sauter

Incumbent Supervisor Aaron Peskin ran for mayor. Danny Sauter won the general election.

=== Candidates ===
- Wendy Ha Chau, civil rights attorney
- Moe Jamil, deputy city attorney
- Sharon Lai, urban planner and nonprofit director
- Eduard Navarro, urban designer and entrepreneur
- Danny Sauter, neighborhood services director
- Matthew Susk, businessman

=== Endorsements ===
Sharon Lai

Political parties

- California Working Families Party

Newspapers

- Bay Area Reporter (first choice)
Danny Sauter

Political parties

- San Francisco Democratic Party

Newspapers

- Bay Area Reporter (second choice)

=== Results ===
District 3 supervisorial election, 2024
Candidate	Votes	%
Danny Sauter	11,272	39.20
Sharon Lai	8,489	29.52
Moe Jamil	3,753	13.05
Matthew Susk	2,800	9.74
Wendy Ha Chau	1,565	5.44
Eduard Navarro	879	3.06
Total votes	28,758	100.00
Ranked choice voting — Pass 5
Danny Sauter	14,056	54.97
Sharon Lai	11,512	45.03
Exhausted votes	3,166	11.02%
Total votes	25,568	100.00

== District 5 ==
San Francisco's 5th supervisorial district election
- November 5, 2024
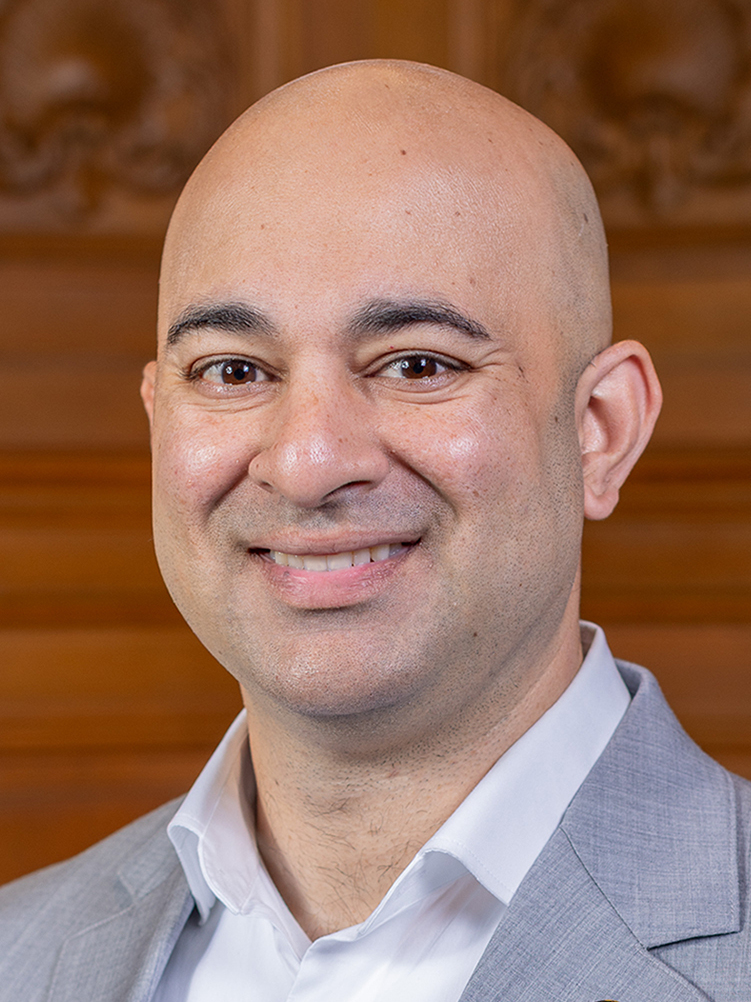

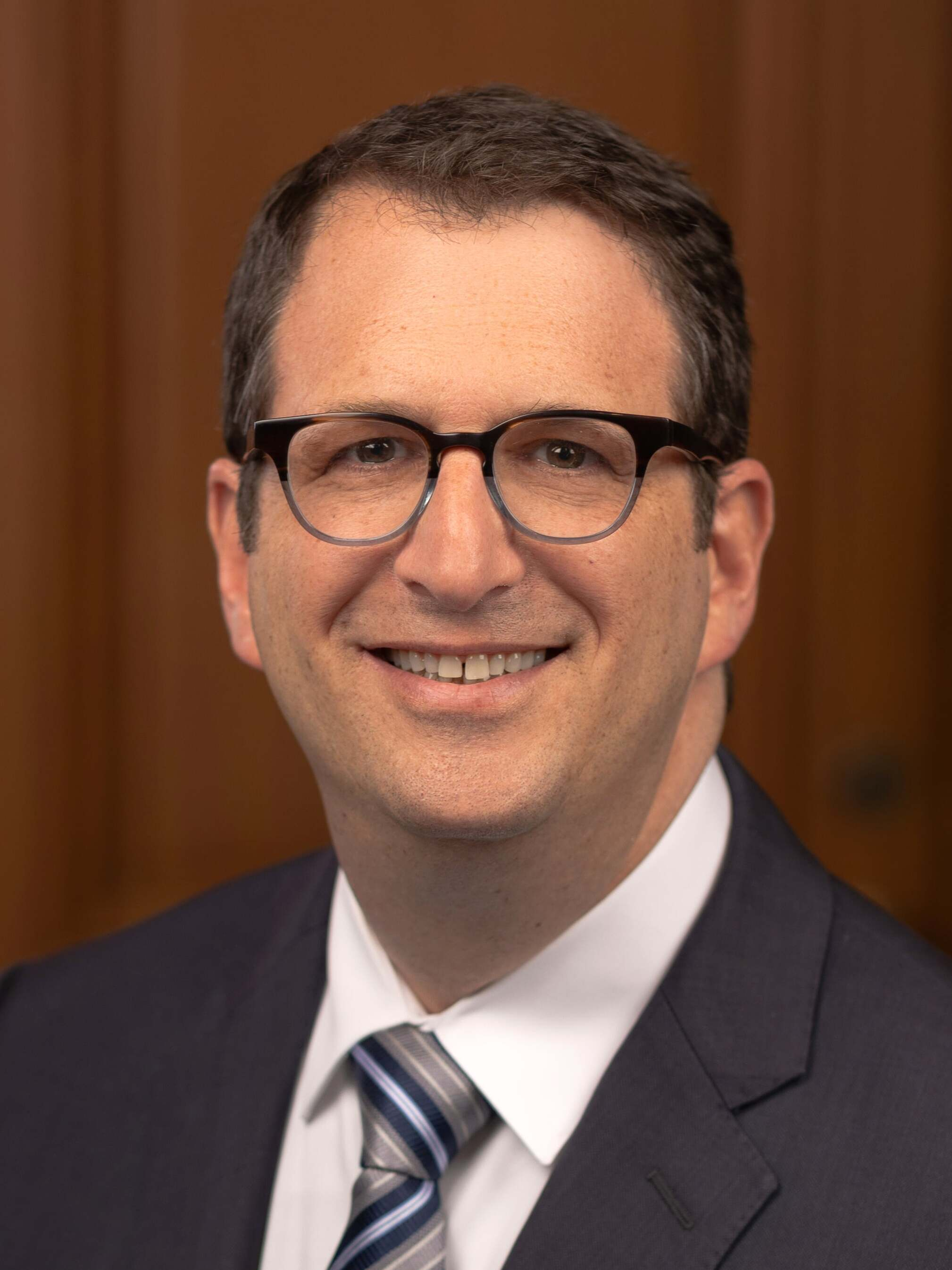
Candidate	Bilal Mahmood	Dean Preston
First round	11,840; 39.87%	12,012; 40.45%
Maximum round	14,741; 52.99%	13,077; 47.01%
Candidate	Scotty Jacobs	Autumn Hope Looijen
First round	2,796; 9.41%	2,606; 8.78%
Maximum round	Eliminated	Eliminated
Supervisor before election
Dean Preston
Elected Supervisor
Bilal Mahmood

Incumbent Supervisor Dean Preston ran for reelection. Bilal Mahmood defeated Preston in the general election.

=== Candidates ===
- Scotty Jacobs, former brand management director
- Allen Jones, activist
- Autumn Hope Looijen, community organizer
- Bilal Mahmood, philanthropic organization founder
- Dean Preston, incumbent supervisor

=== Endorsements ===
Autumn Looijen

Political parties

- San Francisco Republican Party
Bilal Mahmood

Statewide officials

- Rob Bonta, attorney general of California (2021–present)

State legislators

- Scott Wiener, state senator from the 11th district (2016–present)

Individuals

- Saikat Chakrabarti, political activist
- Honey Mahogany, drag performer and activist

Political parties

- San Francisco Democratic Party
Dean Preston

U.S. senators

- Bernie Sanders, Vermont (2007–present)

U.S. representatives

- Nancy Pelosi, former Speaker of the House (2007–2011, 2019–2023) from CA-11 (1987–present)

Local officials

- Connie Chan, San Francisco supervisor

Political parties

- California Working Families Party

Newspapers

- Bay Area Reporter

=== Results ===
District 5 supervisorial election, 2024
Candidate	Votes	%
Dean Preston (incumbent)	12,012	40.45
Bilal Mahmood	11,840	39.87
Scotty Jacobs	2,796	9.41
Autumn Hope Looijen	2,606	8.78
Allen Jones	444	1.50
Total votes	29,698	100.00
Ranked choice voting — Pass 4
Bilal Mahmood	14,741	52.99
Dean Preston (incumbent)	13,077	47.01
Exhausted votes	1,851	6.24%
Total votes	27,818	100.00

== District 7 ==
San Francisco's 7th supervisorial district election
- November 5, 2024
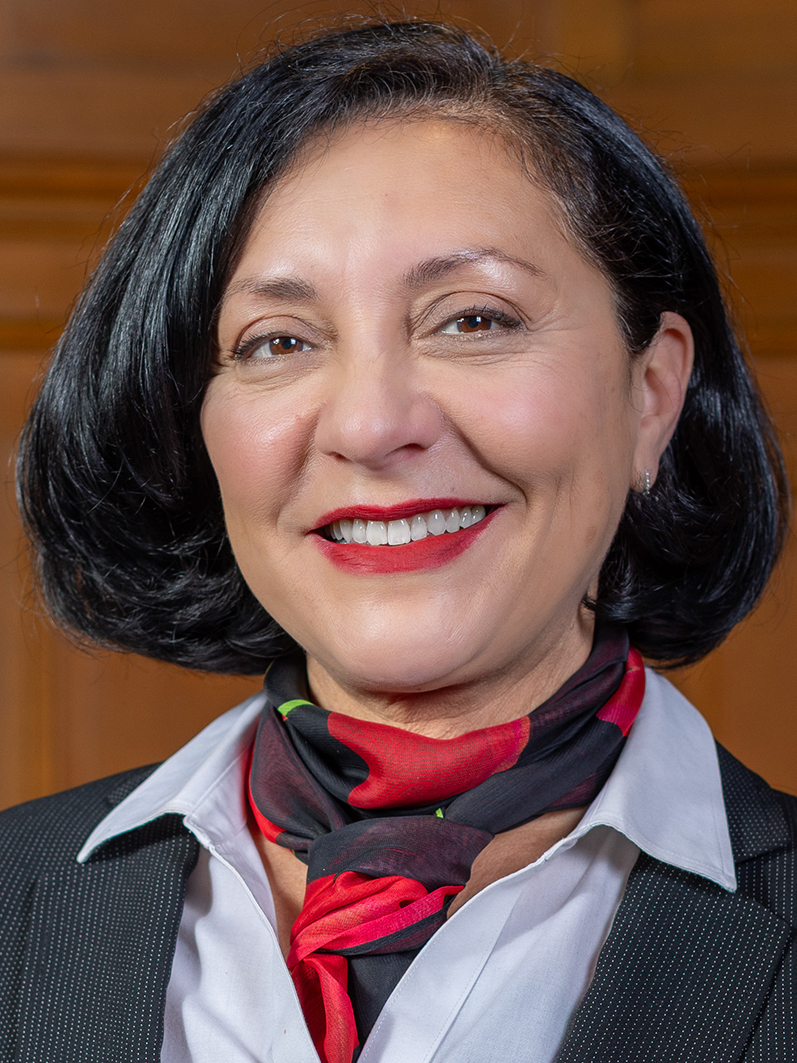

Candidate	Myrna Melgar	Matthew Boschetto	Stephen Martin-Pinto
First round	17,532; 46.98%	13,407; 35.93%	5,135; 13.76%
Maximum round	18,916; 53.42%	16,496; 46.58%	Eliminated
Supervisor before election
Myrna Melgar
Elected Supervisor
Myrna Melgar

Incumbent Supervisor Myrna Melgar ran for reelection.

=== Candidates ===
- Matthew Boschetto, small business owner
- Stephen Martin-Pinto, firefighter
- Myrna Melgar, incumbent supervisor
- Edward Yee, thoracic surgeon

=== Endorsements ===
Stephen Martin-Pinto

Political parties

- San Francisco Republican Party
Myrna Melgar

U.S. representatives

- Nancy Pelosi, former Speaker of the House (2007–2011, 2019–2023) from CA-11 (1987–present)

Political parties

- California Working Families Party
- San Francisco Democratic Party

Newspapers

- Bay Area Reporter
- San Francisco Chronicle

=== Results ===
District 7 supervisorial election, 2024
Candidate	Votes	%
Myrna Melgar (incumbent)	17,532	46.98
Matt Boschetto	13,407	35.93
Stephen Martin-Pinto	5,135	13.76
Edward Yee	1,244	3.33
Total votes	37,318	100.00
Ranked choice voting — Pass 3
Myrna Melgar (incumbent)	18,916	53.42
Matt Boschetto	16,496	46.58
Exhausted votes	1,900	5.09%
Total votes	35,412	100.00

== District 9 ==
San Francisco's 9th supervisorial district election
- November 5, 2024
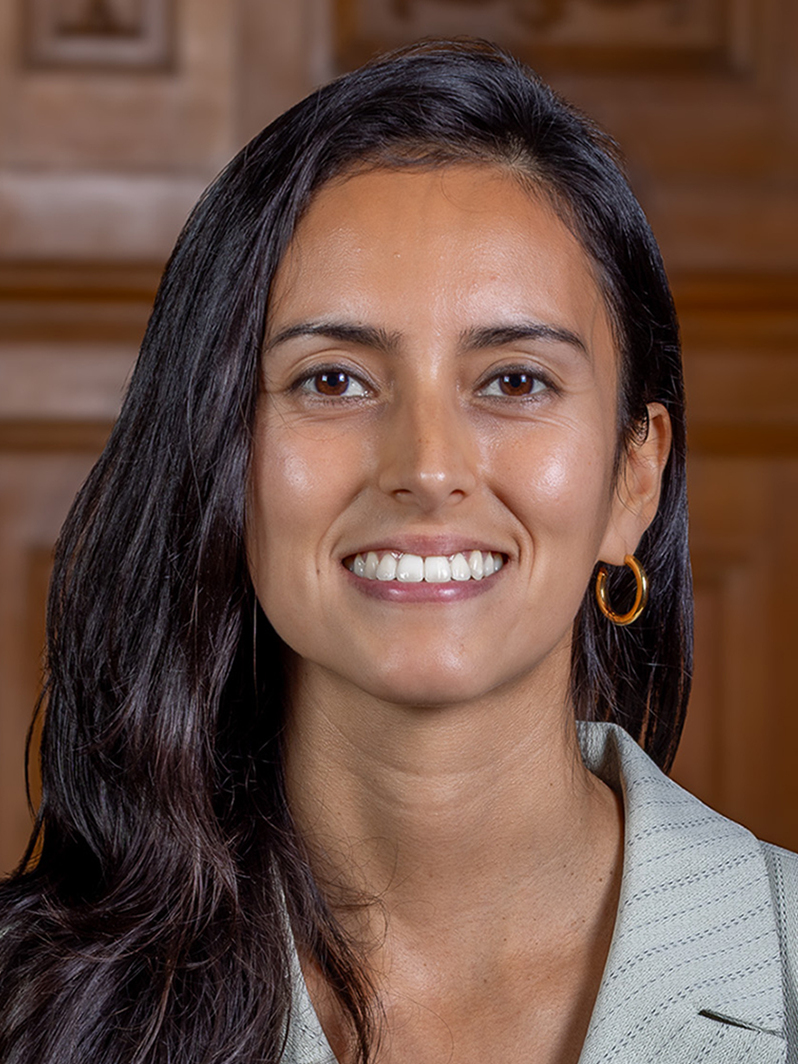

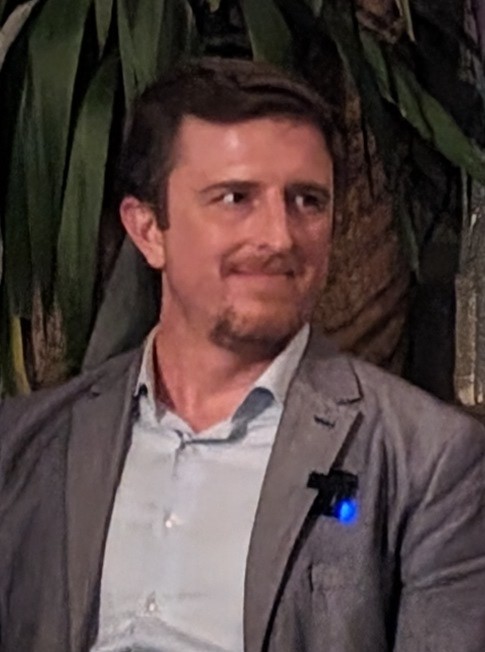

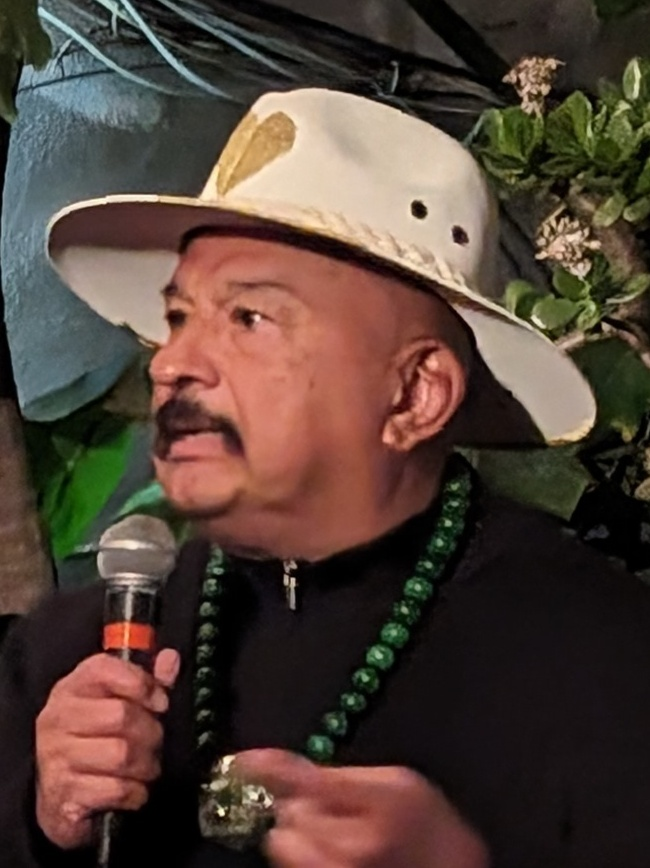
Candidate	Jackie Fielder	Trevor Chandler	Roberto Hernandez
First round	13,844; 42.30%	9,042; 27.63%	6,606; 20.18%
Maximum round	17,546; 59.66%	11,863; 40.34%	Eliminated
Supervisor before election
Hillary Ronen
Elected Supervisor
Jackie Fielder

Incumbent Supervisor Hillary Ronen was term-limited and ineligible to run for reelection. Jackie Fielder was elected.

=== Candidates ===
- Julian Bermudez, veteran
- H. Brown, retired special education teacher
- Trevor Chandler, former director of government and public policy at Citizen
- Jackie Fielder, co-founder of the San Francisco Public Bank Coalition and candidate for California State Senate in 2020
- Jamie Gutierrez, transit supervisor
- Roberto Hernandez, nonprofit CEO
- Stephen Torres, LGBT activist

=== Endorsements ===
Trevor Chandler

Political parties

- San Francisco Democratic Party (first choice)
Jackie Fielder

Political parties

- California Working Families Party (first choice)
Roberto Hernandez

Political parties

- San Francisco Democratic Party (second choice)

Newspapers

- Bay Area Reporter (first choice)
- San Francisco Chronicle
Stephen Torres

Political parties

- California Working Families Party (second choice)

Newspapers

- Bay Area Reporter (second choice)

=== Results ===
District 9 supervisorial election, 2024
Candidate	Votes	%
Jackie Fielder	13,844	42.30
Trevor Chandler	9,042	27.63
Roberto Hernandez	6,606	20.18
Stephen Torres	1,140	3.48
Jamie Gutierrez	931	2.84
Julian Bermudez	600	1.83
H. Brown	568	1.74
Total votes	32,731	100.00
Ranked choice voting — Pass 6
Jackie Fielder	17,546	59.66
Trevor Chandler	11,863	40.34
Exhausted votes	3,285	10.05%
Total votes	29,409	100.00

== District 11 ==
San Francisco's 11th supervisorial district election
- November 5, 2024
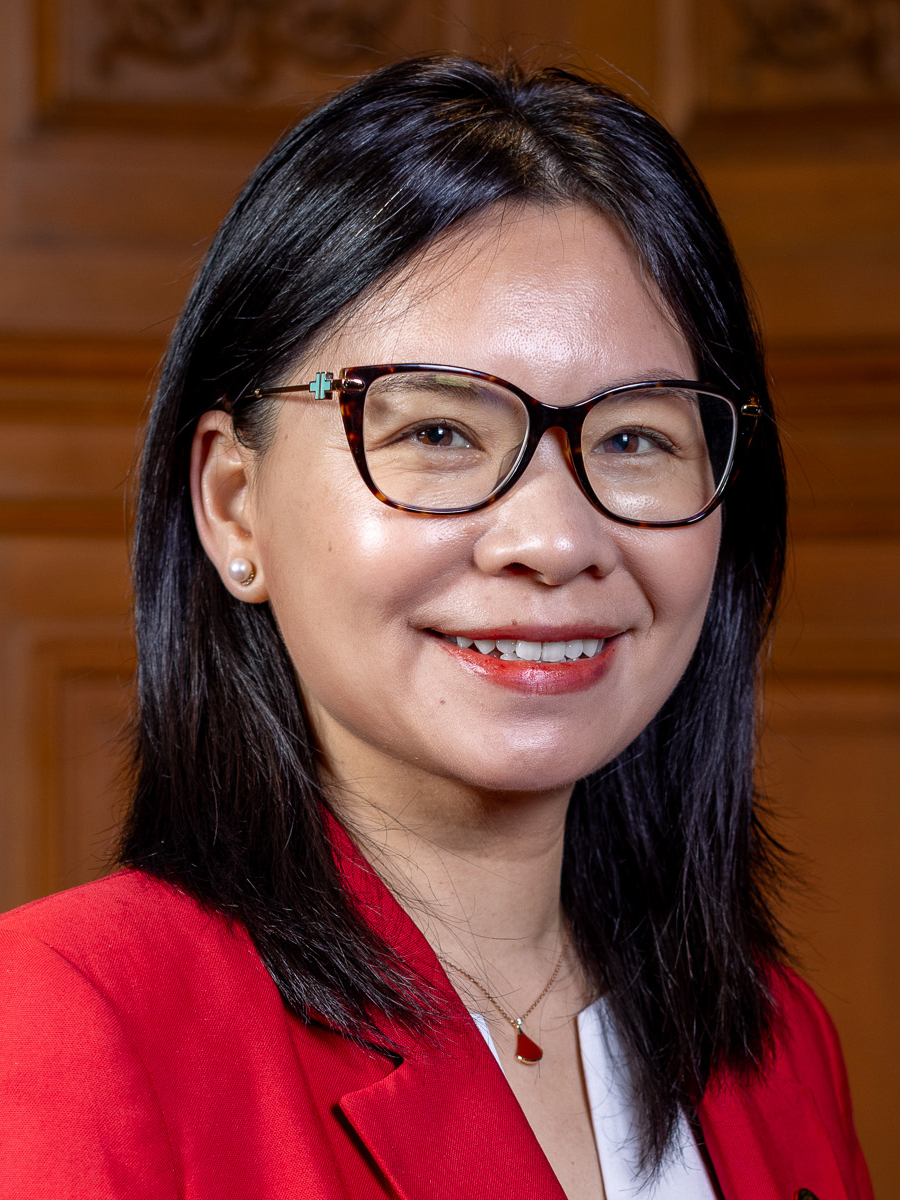

Candidate	Chyanne Chen	Michael Lai	Ernest Jones
First round	8,249; 29.54%	8,675; 31.06%	5,441; 19.48%
Maximum round	12,001; 50.42%	11,803; 49.58%	Eliminated
Candidate	Oscar Flores	Adlah Christi
First round	2,896; 10.37%	1,434; 5.13%
Maximum round	Eliminated	Eliminated
Supervisor before election
Ahsha Safaí
Elected Supervisor
Chyanne Chen

Incumbent Supervisor Ahsha Safaí ran for mayor. Chyanne Chen was elected.

=== Candidates ===
- Chyanne Chen, worker organizer
- Adlah Christi, public policy analyst
- Oscar Flores, engineer
- Ernest "EJ" Jones, community advocate
- Michael Lai, educator
- Roger Marenco, transit operator
- Jose Morales, small-business owner

=== Endorsements ===
Chyanne Chen

Political parties

- California Working Families Party (first choice)

Local officials

- Connie Chan, San Francisco supervisor
Oscar Flores

Political parties

- San Francisco Republican Party
Ernest "EJ" Jones

Political parties

- California Working Families Party (second choice)

Newspapers

- Bay Area Reporter (first choice)
Michael Lai

Political parties

- San Francisco Democratic Party

Newspapers

- Bay Area Reporter (second choice)

Individuals

- Saikat Chakrabarti, political activist

=== Results ===
District 11 supervisorial election, 2024
Candidate	Votes	%
Michael Lai	8,675	31.06
Chyanne Chen	8,249	29.54
Ernest Jones	5,441	19.48
Oscar Flores	2,896	10.37
Adlah Christi	1,434	5.13
Jose Morales	629	2.25
Roger Marenco	604	2.16
Total votes	27,928	100.00
Ranked choice voting — Pass 6
Chyanne Chen	12,001	50.42
Michael Lai	11,803	49.58
Exhausted votes	4,080	14.63%
Total votes	23,804	100.00
