= Filipinos in the San Francisco Bay Area =

The San Francisco Bay Area is the second most populous region for Filipino Americans. Filipino Americans make up 4.6% of San Francisco’s population. There is a large Filipino population in South of Market, Tenderloin and the Peninsula's Filipino community is largely centered in southern part of the city, such as in Crocker-Amazon and in the Excelsior District, Mission District, Outer Mission, Visitacion Valley, San Mateo County cities such as San Bruno, Colma, Brisbane, Millbrae and South San Francisco and Daly City.

The San Francisco Bay Area is the metropolitan area with the second largest number of Filipinos in the United States after the Los Angeles metropolitan area. According to the Pew Research Center study in 2019, there are an estimated 310,000 Filipinos in the San Francisco Bay Area.

== See also ==
- Manilatown, San Francisco
