= 2016 San Francisco Board of Supervisors election =

Local election in San Francisco, California

- November 8, 2016

The 2016 San Francisco Board of Supervisors elections occurred on November 8, 2016. Six of the eleven seats of the San Francisco Board of Supervisors were contested in this election. Three incumbents were termed out of office and three ran for reelection.

Municipal elections in California are officially non-partisan, though most candidates in San Francisco do receive funding and support from various political parties. The election was held using ranked-choice voting.

== Results ==
=== District 1 ===

This district consists of the Richmond. Incumbent supervisor Eric Mar could not seek re-election due to term limits.

District 1 supervisorial election, 2016
Candidate	Votes	%
Sandra Lee Fewer	12,550	39.64
Marjan Philhour	11,067	34.95
David Lee	3,396	10.73
Write-in	52	0.16
Total votes	31,662	100

=== District 3 ===

District 3 consists of the northeastern corner of San Francisco, including Chinatown, the Financial District, Fisherman's Wharf, Nob Hill, North Beach, and Telegraph Hill.

District 3 supervisorial election, 2016
Candidate	Votes	%
Aaron Peskin (incumbent)	19,093	71.33
Tim E. Donnelly	7,395	27.63
Write-in	281	1.05
Total votes	26,769	100

=== District 5 ===

District 5 consists of the Fillmore, Haight-Ashbury, Hayes Valley, Japantown, UCSF, and the Western Addition. Incumbent supervisor London Breed ran for re-election.

District 5 supervisorial election, 2016
Candidate	Votes	%
London Breed (incumbent)	21,318	51.91
Dean Preston	19,534	47.56
Write-in	218	0.53
Total votes	41,070	100

=== District 7 ===

District 7 consists of City College, Forest Hill, Lake Merced, Mount Davidson, Parkmerced, San Francisco State University, St. Francis Wood, and Twin Peaks.

District 7 supervisorial election, 2016
Candidate	Votes	%
Norman Yee (incumbent)	14,154	40.13
Joel Engardio	7,630	21.63
Ben Matranga	6,475	18.36
John Farrell	4,927	13.97
Mike Young	1,995	5.66
Write-in	93	0.26
Total votes	35,274	100.00

=== District 9 ===

District 9 consists of Bernal Heights, the Inner Mission, and the Portola. Incumbent supervisor David Campos could not run for re-election due to term limits.

District 9 supervisorial election, 2016
Candidate	Votes	%
Hillary Ronen	18,335	57.22
Joshua Arce	9,612	30
Melissa San Miguel	3,439	10.73
Iswari Espana	539	1.68
Write-in	118	0.37
Total votes	32,043	100.00

=== District 11 ===

District 11 consists of Crocker-Amazon, the Excelsior, Ingleside, Oceanview, and the Outer Mission. Incumbent supervisor John Avalos could not run for re-election due to term limits.

District 11 supervisorial election, 2016
Candidate	Votes	%
Ahsha Safaí	9,422	37.14
Kim Alvarenga	8,640	34.06
Magdalena de Guzman	3,001	11.83
Francisco Herrera	2,598	10.24
Berta Hernandez	1,599	6.3
Write-in	110	0.43
Total votes	25,370	100.00
