= Chyanne Chen =

American politician and activist

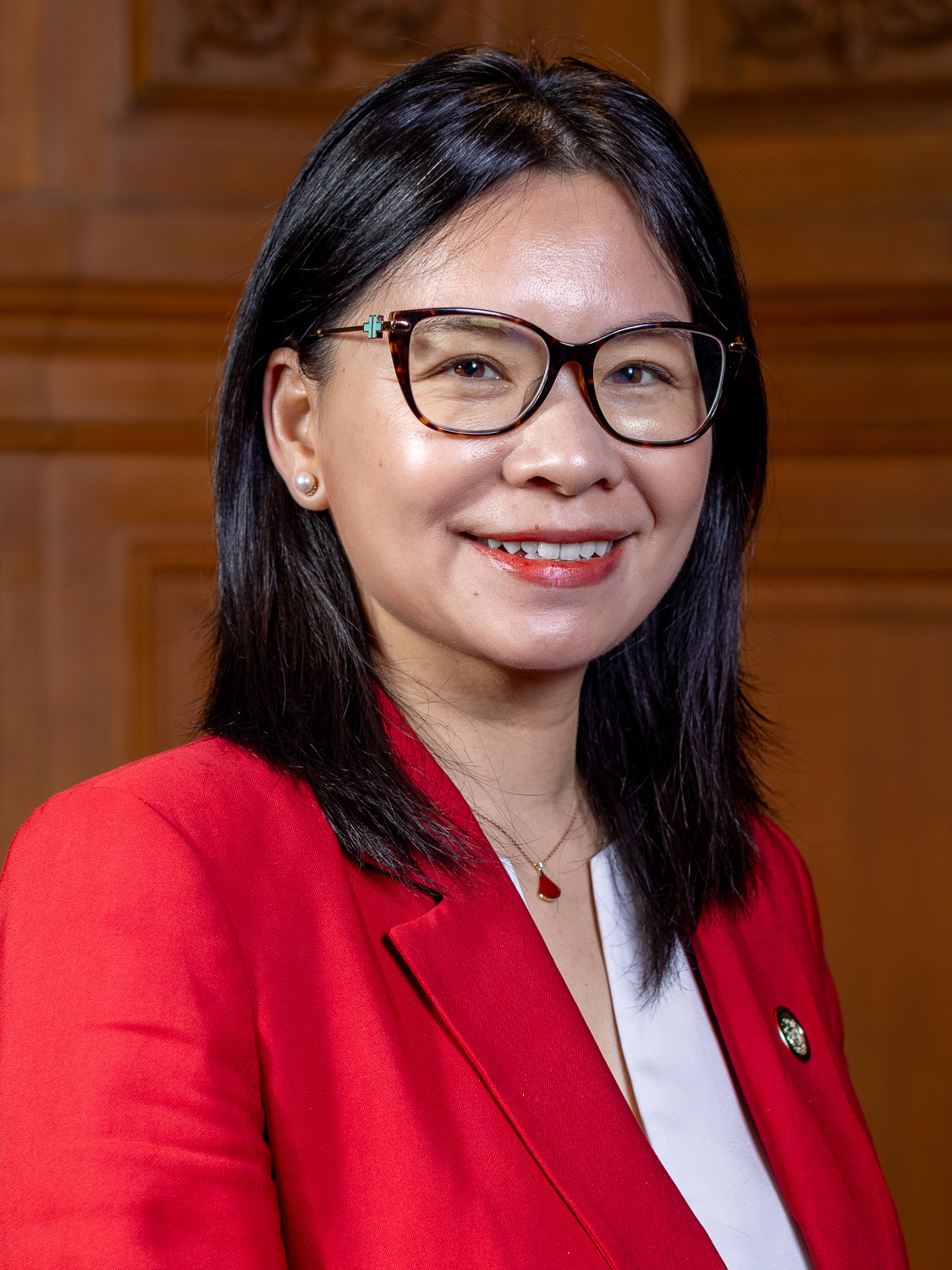
- Official portrait, 2025

Member of the San Francisco Board of Supervisors from the 11th district
- Incumbent
- Assumed office January 8, 2025
- Preceded by: Ahsha Safaí

Personal details
- Born: Guangdong, China
- Party: Democratic
- Education: University of California, Davis (BA); Cornell University (MA); University of Illinois, Urbana-Champaign (attended)

Chinese name
- Traditional Chinese: 陳小焱
- Simplified Chinese: 陈小焱
Transcriptions
Standard Mandarin
- Hanyu Pinyin: Chén Xiǎoyàn
Yue: Cantonese
- Jyutping: Can4 Siu2 Jim6

Chyanne Chen (Chinese: 陳小焱) is an American labor organizer and politician who is a member of the San Francisco Board of Supervisors for District 11, which includes the neighborhoods of Outer Mission, Excelsior, Crocker-Amazon and Ingleside. She previously worked for SEIU 1021 and the Chinese Progressive Association.

== Early life and education ==
Chen was born in Guangdong, China and came to the United States at 15 and has lived in District 11 since 2000. She graduated from Galileo High School and earned a bachelors degree from the University of California, Davis as well as a master's degree in industrial labor relations from Cornell University. She is currently pursuing a Doctor of Education from the University of Illinois Urbana-Champaign.

== San Francisco Board of Supervisors ==
=== 2024 campaign ===
Chen ran for District 11 of the San Francisco Board of Supervisors, where incumbent Ahsha Safaí was term-limited and running in the concurrent mayoral election. She listed expanding translation services, identifying wasteful spending and unused funds, affordable housing for seniors, building a new library, advocated for public safety, subsidizing child-care, and improving parks and streets as legislative priorities. Fellow candidate Ernest Jones and Chen formed a ranked-choice voting 'alliance' where supporters of each candidate would rank the other candidate second. Considered a progressive, she was endorsed by Myrna Melgar, Phil Ting, Norman Yee, Sandra Lee Fewer, Mabel Teng, and Safaí. She narrowly defeated Michael Lai in the instant run-off election with 50.4% of the vote, making it the closest supervisor race of any district in the 2024 election.

=== Tenure ===
In December 2025, Chen voted against legislation to upzone 60% of San Francisco to allow for more housing. Chen was a leading critic of the zoning reform, arguing "This legislation is an example of the government doing things to our communities, not with our communities. It applied a top-down framework that has little to do with the housing affordability and insecurity or the great demand for workforce housing in San Francisco."
