= John Avalos =

American politician

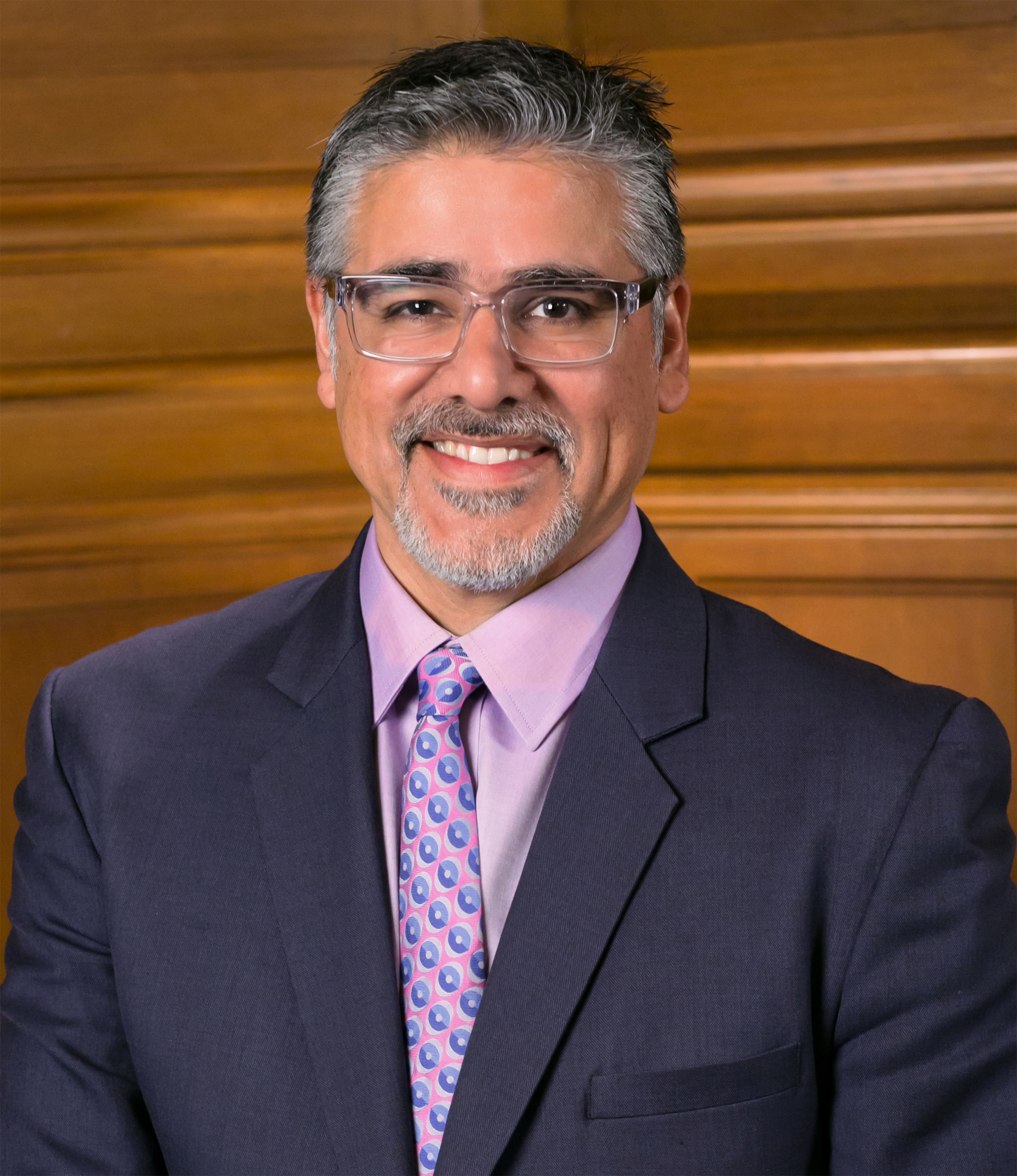
- Official portrait, 2015

Member of the San Francisco Board of Supervisors from District 11
- In office January 8, 2009 – January 8, 2017
- Mayor: Gavin Newsom; Ed Lee
- Preceded by: Gerardo Sandoval
- Succeeded by: Ahsha Safaí

Personal details
- Born: March 11, 1964 (age 62) Wilmington, California, U.S.
- Party: Democratic
- Education: University of California, Santa Barbara (BA); San Francisco State University (MA)
- Occupation: Politician
- Website: Supervisor John Avalos

John Avalos (born March 11, 1964) is an American politician. He served two terms as a member of the San Francisco Board of Supervisors from 2008 to 2016. Avalos represented District 11 in San Francisco, consisting of the Crocker-Amazon, Excelsior, Ingleside, Oceanview, and Outer Mission districts. Avalos was elected on November 4, 2008, in the 2008 San Francisco election and took office on January 8, 2009. He was re-elected in the 2012 San Francisco election with 94 percent of the vote, and termed out of office in January 2017.

== Early life and education ==
Avalos is Mexican-American/Chicano and was born in Wilmington, California. Along with his three brothers and two sisters, he was raised by his mother Erlinda, an office worker, and his father Hector, a longshoreman and member of the International Longshore and Warehouse Union. His parents divorced when he was young, and his mother cared for them on her own. Avalos moved to Andover, Massachusetts as a teenager and graduated from Andover High School in 1982.

After graduating from Andover, Avalos moved back to California, where he soon attended the University of California, Santa Barbara and earned a bachelor's degree in English. In 1989, Avalos moved to San Francisco, California where he later earned a Masters in Social Work from San Francisco State University.

== Career ==
=== San Francisco supervisor ===
Before being elected to the Board of Supervisors, Avalos was a legislative aide for supervisor Chris Daly.

On November 4, 2008, Avalos was elected to the San Francisco Board of Supervisors. Under the City's instant-runoff voting system, Avalos won the election for District 11 supervisor with 28.23% of the total votes in round one and 52.93% in round four.

==== Budgeting and municipal finance ====
In 2010, Avalos passed legislation to set a 5-cent fee per serving of alcohol to raise funding for emergency services in response to alcohol consumption. Mayor Gavin Newsom vetoed the bill and Avalos failed to garner the eight votes to override the veto.

In 2010, Avalos crafted an increase to San Francisco's Real Estate Transfer Tax for properties valued over $5,000,000 and $10,000,000. Voters approved his proposal, Proposition N, on November 2, 2010. Prop N has since raised hundreds of millions of dollars in revenue for the City.

In 2012, Avalos worked with Mayor Ed Lee to update the City's business tax by creating a progressive gross receipts tax that included an exemption for small and low-profit businesses. The final ordinance the Board of Supervisors placed on the ballot generated millions more in new revenue than the Mayor's revenue-neutral measure, raising $32 million annually subject to the consumer price index. The new revenues ensured funding for the Affordable Housing Trust Fund that passed on the same ballot.

In 2015, Avalos challenged Mayor Lee's $250 million housing bond by crafting a measure which resulted in the Mayor increasing his bond to $310 million. The larger bond enabled affordable housing projects to be financed in greater amounts in District 11 and District 9 than under Mayor Lee's original plan. The new revenues ensured funding for the Affordable Housing Trust Fund which passed on the same ballot.

==== Employment and local hiring ====
In December 2010, working with a coalition of labor and Black, Brown, and Asian community organizations, Avalos passed the strongest Local Hiring Ordinance in the country. The ordinance was crafted during the great recession years at a time when San Francisco had one of its highest unemployment rates in decades. Since the 1990s, the City relied on a nonbinding local hiring ordinance called First Source, which never achieved measurable success. Avalos' Local Hiring Ordinance is based on the principle that public spending and development should benefit local residents and disadvantaged workers. The ordinance targeted neighborhoods with the highest rates of unemployment.

The Local Hiring Ordinance required publicly funded contractors to hire local residents starting at a rate of 20% for each trade working on a project, rising by 5% each year up to 50%. Despite early opposition from the Building Trades Council, the ordinance went to a local resident-hiring rate of more than 50% after six years. Avalos later expanded the ordinance to apply to private development on public land.

==== Criminal and environmental justice ====
In his second term in office and his role as a director of the Bay Area Air Quality Management District (BAAQMD), Avalos championed environmental initiatives such as Clean Power SF, the City's renewable power program, and worked to adopt the BAAQMD's 10 Point Climate Action Program.

In 2013, Avalos initiated an effort to convince the San Francisco Employees Retirement System Board to divest from fossil fuel corporations. Avalos also worked on opposition to the Keystone XL Pipeline and rulemaking to limit emissions from petroleum refineries, particularly around working-class communities of color.

In 2016, Avalos sponsored and passed the Keep It in the Ground Ordinance banning the use of San Francisco public land for fossil fuel extraction and setting in motion the closure of Chevron oil drilling on City-owned land in Kern River Oil Field in Kern County, California.

==== Immigrants rights ====
In 2013 Avalos updated the City's Sanctuary City status by passing the Due Process for All Ordinance in response to the Federal Immigration and Customs Enforcement Agency's Secure Communities or S-Comm program. The measure sought to prohibit unconstitutional detention of any person in San Francisco law enforcement custody beyond his or her release date at the request of immigration officials. The measure also sought to limit involvement by local law enforcement with S-Comm, which has resulted in thousands of deportations nationwide, dividing families and fracturing communities. The Secure Communities Program was criticized for creating a dragnet wherein even U.S. citizens were detained and was finally terminated in 2014 and replaced with the Priority Enforcement Program. In 2016, Avalos introduced legislation to set a common standard between San Francisco's landmark Sanctuary City Ordinance and the Due Process for All Ordinance.

==== Community development and municipal banking ====
His office funded neighborhood planning efforts that led to the City setting aside land for transit-oriented affordable housing. Avalos' efforts to address community workforce development needs led to the creation of a workforce center in District 11 focusing on employment development and enforcement of workers' rights. Avalos supported District 11 community efforts to develop urban agriculture and community gardening projects. In other district initiatives, Avalos helped foster community-led grantmaking programs; neighborhood art projects in which neighborhood artists created murals, public plazas, and sculptures; and new walkways, stairs, and pathways in neighborhood parks and open spaces.

In 2010, Avalos passed legislation affirming the Ocean Avenue Community Benefit Initiative, supporting years of community effort and setting Ocean Ave on a stronger trajectory of sustainable neighborhood serving economic growth. Despite limited economic growth in the southern neighborhoods of District 11, in 2015 Avalos succeeded in bringing a branch of the San Francisco Federal Credit Union to the Excelsior District.

During the Great Recession years and afterward, mortgage defaults and foreclosure rates were particularly high in San Francisco's south and southeastern neighborhoods. Avalos worked with the Association of California Communities for Empowerment (ACCE) to occupy homes where households face evictions after struggling to modify their mortgages. With ACCE, Avalos advocated at local and federal levels to create home loan principal reduction programs and to strengthen community development financial institutions' leverage to address foreclosure and enable households to modify their mortgage with principal reduction.

Following the 2008–09 recession and the home loan crisis, starting in 2011, Avalos championed the idea of a Municipal Bank for San Francisco. In 2012, Avalos began the city's process of studying the creation of a public bank. In 2016, San Francisco supervisors unanimously passed legislation by Avalos cutting ties with Wells Fargo, following the bank's "phony accounts" scandal. San Francisco supervisors approved a resolution in 2019 urging California lawmakers to allow the city to create its own public bank.

=== 2011 San Francisco mayoral campaign ===
On April 18, 2011, Avalos filed to run for mayor of San Francisco as a progressive candidate. Avalos placed second in the race after incumbent Mayor Ed Lee.

On January 18, 2019, the San Francisco Ethics Commission fined Avalos $12,146 for failing to properly disclose campaign finances from his unsuccessful run for mayor in 2011. According to the Ethics Commission, Avalos' campaign committee improperly reported $26,506 – or 11 percent – of his total contributions. The committee also failed to maintain complete records for $391,594 in expenditures, 60 percent of the total money spent. Avalos accepted the settlement in front of the commission.

== Personal life ==
Avalos was married to Karen Zapata, a public school teacher, and they have two children. They separated in 2014 after Avalos revealed he had had an affair with his legislative aide, Raquel Redondiez. Avalos and Zapata divorced in 2017. They continue to co-parent their children. Avalos married Raquel Redondiez in June 2022.
