= Amplitude, Inc. =

American public developer of analytics software

- Type: Public
- Traded as: Nasdaq: AMPL
- Industry: Software
- Founded: 2014; 12 years ago
- Founder: Spenser Skates; Curtis Liu
- Headquarters: San Francisco, California, United States
- Products: Amplitude Analytics
- Revenue: ▲US$343 million (2025)
- Net income: ▲ −US$88.5 million (2025)
- Website: amplitude.com

Amplitude is an American publicly traded company that develops digital analytics software. The company was listed publicly on the Nasdaq stock exchange under the ticker symbol AMPL on September 28, 2021.

== History ==
The company's founders, Spenser Skates and Curtis Liu, originally created a company under the name Sonalight in 2012. Sonalight produces an Android app that enabled users to send text messages via voice. Along the way, they created analytics software to help them understand how users were using the app. That software received interest from other companies with similar needs, and the founders shifted their focus to building that software into a product via a new company called Amplitude.

Amplitude Inc. was founded in 2014. The company's first product, Amplitude Analytics, was listed as the #22 software product in 2021 by popular review site G2 Crowd. The addition of their Amplitude Recommend, and Amplitude Experiment products enabled what the company calls its Digital Optimization System. On March 10, 2020, they acquired ClearBrain, a predictive analytics company founded in 2016 by Bilal Mahmood, and Eric Pollmann. The following year on May 12, 2021, they acquired Iteratively, a data pipeline company founded in 2019 by Patrick Thompson and Ondrej Hrebicek.

The company held their public offering on the Nasdaq stock exchange on September 28, 2021.

=== Early IPO ===
After several other rounds of funding, in June 2021 the company received $150 million in its final private investment led by the venture capital firm Sequoia Capital at a valuation of $4 billion. Despite the recent funding, the company's CEO decided to take Amplitude public because he believed it would make the company stronger as Facebook founder Mark Zuckerberg had claimed after Facebook's IPO. Despite the company's age at nine years, this decision was viewed as a reversal from the trend of tech companies staying private for as long as possible. The company's ample funding would have allowed them to freely choose either path, public or private, highlighting the break from the prior norm.

=== Direct listing ===
Amplitude was also the subject of much discussion for its unusual choice of a direct public offering as it approached IPO. This decision was seen as paving the way for yet more direct public offerings, another break from recent norms. Spenser Skates, the company's CEO, stated that he viewed the selection of this style of IPO to be necessary for all companies, noting the high cost of the under-pricing which is typical of standard IPOs. However, a direct public listing was at least partly enabled by the company's $300 million cash on hand, meaning the company did not need to raise significant funds from their IPO. Not all other companies can afford this choice. Still, their direct listing was described as "a watershed moment for direct listings" and it was noted that "the entire market is looking at Amplitude." They held their public offering on the Nasdaq stock exchange on September 28, 2021. The first day of trading increased the company's value from $5 billion to $7.1 billion, leading the CEO of the company to claim that traditional IPOs are antiquated, and "the craziest thing in the world."

Skates has stated that he did at least briefly consider going public via SPAC. However, he decided against the move because he believed SPACs are an "end run around SEC rules."

=== Company growth ===
Amplitude benefited from the increasing trend of businesses moving toward digital services during the COVID-19 pandemic, including prominent customers Ford Motor Co., Burger King and Gap Inc. At the time of IPO, they reported $72 million in revenue for the first half of 2021, a year over year increase of 56%.

In August 2023, Amplitude introduced two AI-powered features: Data Assistant, which uses large language models to score data quality and recommend improvements, and Ask Amplitude, which allows users to query analytics data in natural language. In October 2024, the company acquired Command AI, a San Francisco-based startup developing in-app user engagement tools, for approximately $45 million. Command AI's 30-person team served 25 million end-users through clients including HashiCorp, Gusto, and LaunchDarkly.

In May 2026, Amplitude acquired Statsig's brand, customers, and platform.

== Products ==
Their first product, Amplitude Analytics, was designed to help software product developers better understand behavior of their users. It has been called the "Moneyball" for product development due to its focus on providing product developers with greater statistical understanding of user behavior.
