= Bilal Mahmood =

American entrepreneur and politician

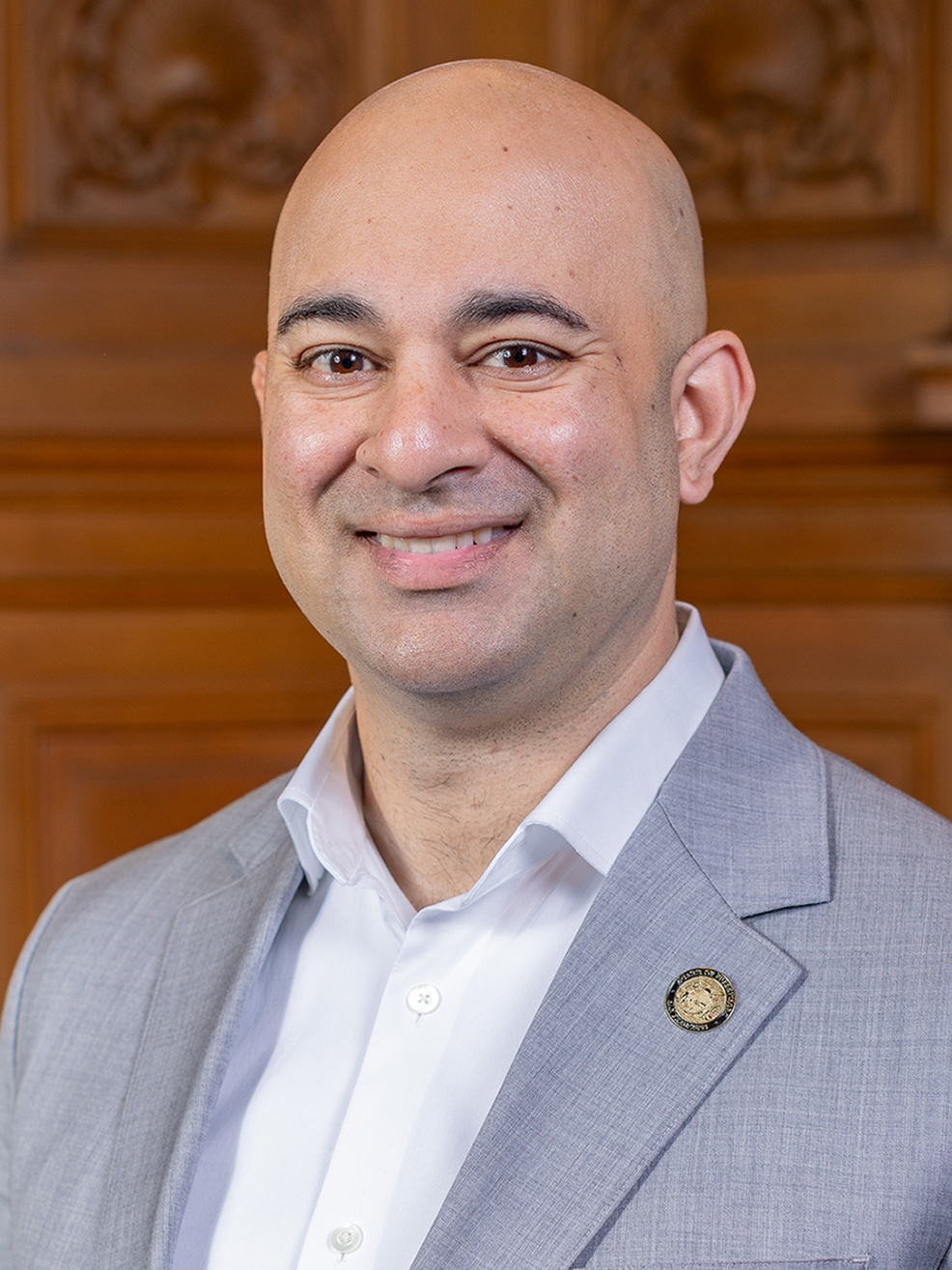
- Official portrait, 2025

Member of the San Francisco Board of Supervisors from the 5th district
- Incumbent
- Assumed office January 8, 2025
- Preceded by: Dean Preston

Personal details
- Born: 1986 or 1987 (age 39–40) Palo Alto, California, U.S.
- Party: Democratic
- Spouse: Cynthia Wu (m. 2025)
- Education: Stanford University (BS); King's College, Cambridge (MPhil)

Bilal Mahmood (born 1986 or 1987) is an American entrepreneur, philanthropist, and elected official, currently serving as a member of the San Francisco Board of Supervisors representing District 5. Mahmood was elected to the Board of Supervisors in 2024, defeating incumbent supervisor Dean Preston.

Prior to elected office, Mahmood was a policy analyst in the Obama administration, as well as co-founder of the Foundation 13 Fund and the software company ClearBrain, where he also served as CEO. Amplitude acquired ClearBrain in March 2020.

== Early life ==
Mahmood was born and raised in Palo Alto, California. Mahmood's parents and grandparents immigrated from Pakistan.

Mahmood finished high school in Lahore, Pakistan, where his family moved after 9/11. He graduated Stanford University in 2009 with a degree in biology and a minor in business. At Stanford, he interned at the Stanford Pediatric Surgery Lab and co-founded a microloan non-profit that has distributed more than $13,000. He was named a Gates Cambridge Scholar in 2009 and attended King's College, Cambridge, where he earned a master's degree in bioscience enterprise. Mahmood has described himself as a "neuroscientist" in his public communications. However, this claim was challenged by neuroscientists and later removed from Mahmood's website and social media profiles.

== Career ==
Mahmood was a policy analyst during the Obama administration in the Office of Innovation and Entrepreneurship for the United States Department of Commerce in 2011.

After working in the Obama administration and several technology companies, Mahmood founded ClearBrain, a predictive analytics software company which Mahmood describes as technology for mission-minded organizations and small businesses, helping them compete with Amazon. Mahmood served as ClearBrain's CEO until March 2020, when analytics firm Amplitude announced it had acquired ClearBrain for an undisclosed sum.

Mahmood started the Foundation 13 Fund in 2020, investing in nonprofits local to San Francisco on issues including small business relief, anti-Asian violence, and local journalism. Its first grant raised $100,000 to support restaurant workers impacted by the COVID-19 pandemic.

=== 2022 California State Assembly candidacy ===
Mahmood announced he was running as a Democrat for California's 17th State Assembly district in a 2022 special election on September 30, 2021. He received public support from Saikat Chakrabarti. Together, Mahmood and Chakrabarti planned an environmental framework similar to the Green New Deal for California, including a carbon tax to fund zero-interest loans for green retrofits.

Mahmood based his platform on a number of issues including supporting a San Francisco Board of Education recall, a program to end homelessness in over 80 cities and counties, a guaranteed income program for Californians, expanding the California Earned Income Tax Credit ceiling to $75,000, and a combination of carbon and wealth taxes.

Mahmood finished third, subsequently endorsing Matt Haney. Haney ultimately defeated David Campos in the runoff election and was sworn in on May 3, 2022.

=== San Francisco political advocacy ===
Mahmood has continued to advocate for reforms in the permitting and approvals process for new construction in San Francisco, identifying excessive bureaucracy as a driver of homelessness and inequality in the city. Soon after Mahmood delineated these issues in the San Francisco Chronicle in March 2023, city Supervisor Ahsha Safai and San Francisco Mayor London Breed put forward separate bills to streamline the city's complex and time-consuming housing approval process.

Mahmood collaborated with Assemblyman Matt Haney on legislation which would compel California's Energy Commission to create an emission reduction strategy for buildings and homes with clearly outlined requirements and milestones. The proposed legislation was praised for its potential to bolster investment in local businesses and create jobs in the state.

=== San Francisco Board of Supervisors ===
Mahmood announced his candidacy for the District 5 seat of the San Francisco Board of Supervisors in January 2024, running as a moderate against the incumbent Dean Preston. The race was highly contentious, and Mahmood faced multiple allegations of violating campaign ethics laws over the course of the election cycle. Opponents claimed that his campaign had funded mailers and political advertisements through an uncapped Democratic Party account, flouting the city's strict campaign contribution limits. The city's ethics commission ultimately found that he had committed no material violations. Mahmood defeated Preston in ranked-choice voting in the November election. On November 11, 2024, incumbent Supervisor Dean Preston conceded the District 5 race to Mahmood.

In 2026, Mahmood put forth a bill that would prevent NIMBYs from filing California Environmental Quality Act lawsuits against housing on the basis that new housing creates shadow.

== Personal life ==
In April 2025, during Autism Awareness Month, Mahmood publicly disclosed his Level 1 autism diagnosis. He sought medical help in 2021 after entering San Francisco politics and received his diagnosis in his mid-30s.

Mahmood began dating Cynthia Wu, a product manager at Google X, in 2023 after meeting her on Hinge following his 2022 assembly election loss; Wu had voted for him in that election and knew of him through her former manager, who was married to ClearBrain's co‑founder. Mahmood and Wu married in 2025 at the San Francisco Conservatory of Flowers, with several San Francisco politicians attending the ceremony.
