= Ahsha Safaí =

American politician (born 1973)

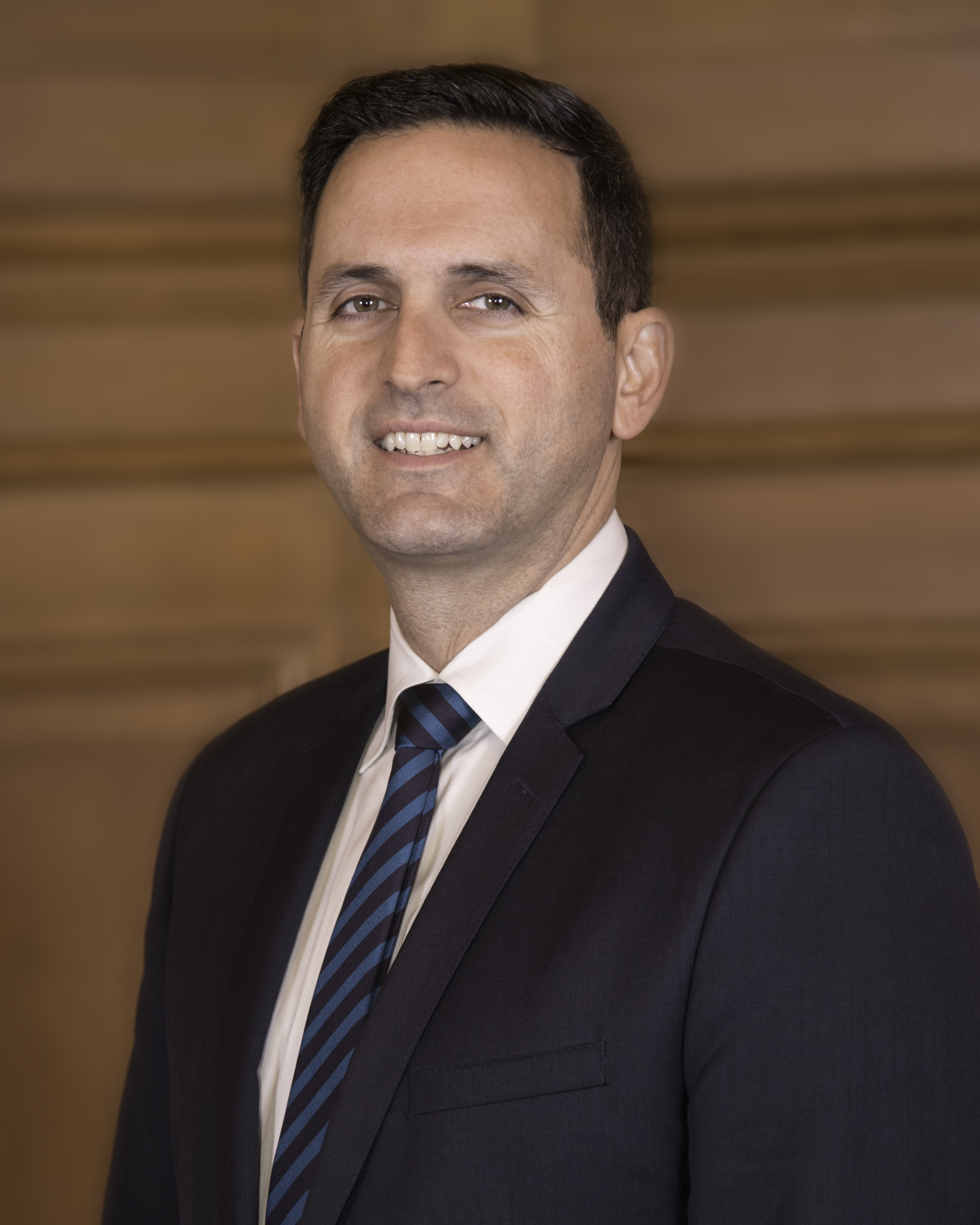
- Official portrait, 2017

Member of the San Francisco Board of Supervisors from the 11th district
- In office January 9, 2017 – January 8, 2025
- Preceded by: John Avalos
- Succeeded by: Chyanne Chen

Personal details
- Born: 1973 (age 52–53) Pahlavi Iran
- Party: Democratic
- Education: Northeastern University (BA); Massachusetts Institute of Technology (MS)
- Website: Government website

Ahsha Safaí (born 1973) is an Iranian-American elected official in San Francisco, California. He served as a member of the San Francisco Board of Supervisors representing Supervisorial District 11 from 2017 to 2025.

District 11 includes the neighborhoods of Excelsior, Ingleside, Oceanview, Merced Heights, Ingleside Heights, Mission Terrace, Outer Mission, Cayuga, and Crocker Amazon.

== Early life, education and career ==
Safaí was born in Iran in 1973, and moved with his mother to Cambridge, Massachusetts at the age of five.

In San Francisco, Safaí served as political director for the janitors union local.

== San Francisco Board of Supervisors ==
In 2008, he ran for the District 11 seat on the San Francisco Board of Supervisors against John Avalos, losing by a close margin. Safaí ran again in 2016, successfully, replacing Avalos who was termed out of office. During the 2016 race, he ran against Kimberly Alvarenga; Safaí was endorsed by the San Francisco Chronicle.

In April 2022, Safaí voted against keeping cars off the east end of John F. Kennedy Drive in Golden Gate Park. The ordinance passed 7–4.

=== Actions on housing ===
He worked with Supervisors Dean Preston and Aaron Peskin to delay the construction of thousands of housing units in the Hub so that TODCO, a low-income housing non-profit in San Francisco, could perform a race and equity study on the project within six months. More than two years later, TODCO had not begun the study and the group said it had no intent to do so.

In 2021, Safaí said he would oppose the building of modular housing for the homeless in San Francisco unless it used labor from San Francisco; a Vallejo company had up until then provided modular housing complexes faster and cheaper than other companies could. In 2021, Safaí supported a proposal by Mayor London Breed to streamline housing production in San Francisco.

In 2024, Safaí voted to downzone San Francisco’s Northern Waterfront, reducing the amount and density of housing that could be permitted in the area.

== 2024 San Francisco mayoral election ==
In May 2023, Safaí filed to run in the 2024 San Francisco mayoral election, challenging incumbent London Breed.

== Personal life ==
Safaí, his wife Yadira, and their children live in San Francisco's Excelsior District.
