= Danny Sauter =

American politician

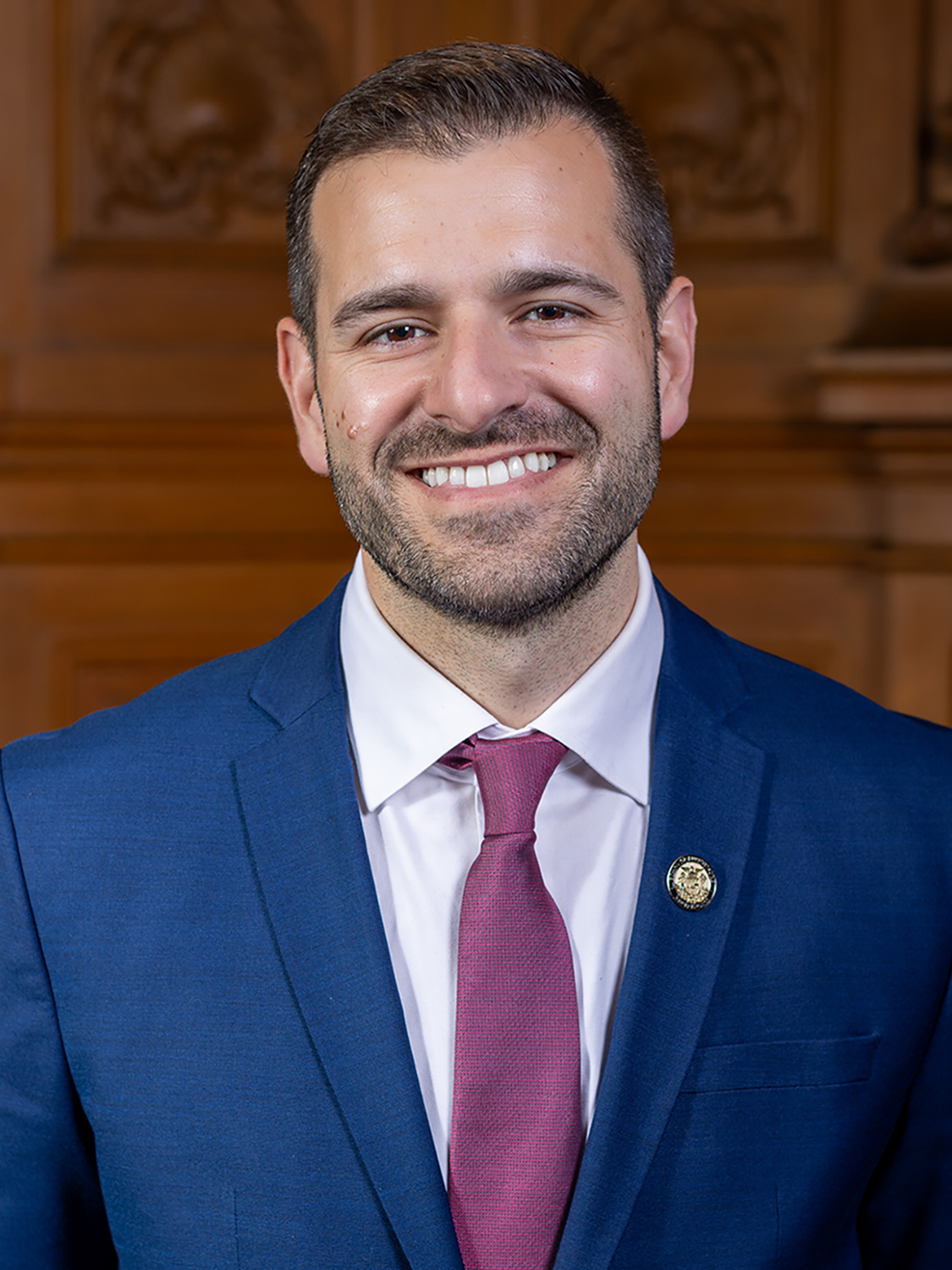
- Official portrait, 2025

Member of the San Francisco Board of Supervisors from the 3rd district
- Incumbent
- Assumed office January 8, 2025
- Preceded by: Aaron Peskin

Personal details
- Born: 1987/1988 (age 37–38) Columbus, Ohio, U.S.
- Party: Democratic
- Education: Miami University (BA)

Chinese name
- Traditional Chinese: 李爾德
- Simplified Chinese: 李尔德
Transcriptions
Standard Mandarin
- Hanyu Pinyin: Lǐ Ěrdé
Yue: Cantonese
- Jyutping: Lei5 ji5 dak1

Daniel J. Sauter (born 1987/1988) is an American politician serving as a member of the San Francisco Board of Supervisors for District 3 since January 8, 2025. District 3 includes the neighborhoods of North Beach, Chinatown, Telegraph Hill, North Waterfront, Financial District, Nob Hill, Union Square, Maiden Lane, Polk Gulch, and part of Russian Hill.

== Early life and education ==
Sauter was born in Columbus, Ohio. He graduated from Miami University in Oxford, Ohio, having majored in marketing and minored in entrepreneurship and Chinese.

== Political career ==
In 2016, Sauter volunteered for the campaign of Scott Wiener for the California State Senate.

Sauter ran for the San Francisco Board of Supervisors in 2020, but placed second behind incumbent supervisor Aaron Peskin.

In 2024 Sauter ran for the same seat again, as Peskin was term-limited. Sauter won the election.
