= Norman Yee =

American politician

Norman Yee 余鼎昂
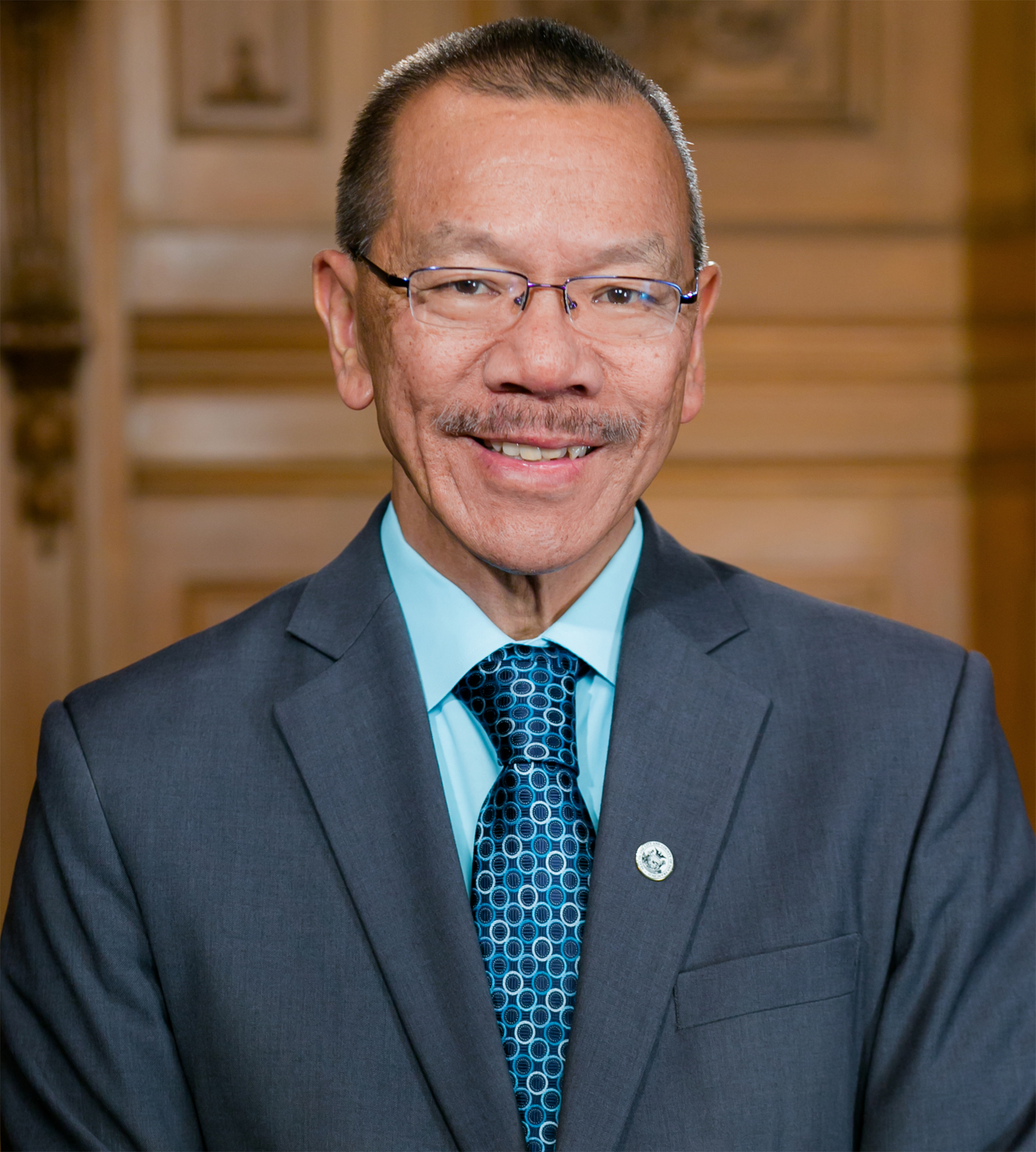
- Official portrait, 2015

President of the San Francisco Board of Supervisors
- In office January 9, 2019 – January 8, 2021
- Preceded by: Malia Cohen
- Succeeded by: Shamann Walton

Member of the San Francisco Board of Supervisors from District 7
- In office January 8, 2013 – January 1, 2021
- Mayor: Ed Lee; London Breed
- Preceded by: Sean Elsbernd
- Succeeded by: Myrna Melgar

Personal details
- Born: July 29, 1949 (age 77) San Francisco, California, U.S.
- Party: Democratic
- Education: University of California, Berkeley (BS); San Francisco State University (MA)
- Occupation: Politician
- Website: Board of Supervisors; District 7 website
- Norman Yee's voice Norman Yee on his early life and career Recorded July 23, 2013

Norman Yee
- Chinese: 余鼎昂
Transcriptions
Standard Mandarin
- Hanyu Pinyin: Yú Dǐng-áng
- IPA: [y̌ tìŋǎŋ]
Yue: Cantonese
- Yale Romanization: Yu4 Ding2-ngong4
- Jyutping: Jyu4 Ding2-ngong4

Norman Yee (Chinese: 余鼎昂; pinyin: Yú Dǐng-áng, born July 29, 1949) is a former American elected official and educator in San Francisco, California. He served as a member of the San Francisco Board of Supervisors representing Supervisorial District 7 from 2012 to 2021 and was elected president of the Board in January 2019.

== Early life and education ==
Yee was born at Chinese Hospital in Chinatown, San Francisco and grew up working at his parents' grocery store in Noe Valley, San Francisco. As a child, he had a speech impediment and would often get into fights when teased.

Yee attended Galileo Academy of Science and Technology. From there, he attended City College of San Francisco from 1967 to 1971. He later transferred to University of California, Berkeley, where he received his bachelor's degree in civil engineering and subsequently completed a master's degree in education from San Francisco State University.

== Career ==
Yee taught ESL and citizenship at City College from 1984 to 1994.

Yee served as the executive director for Wu Yee Children's Service, an advocacy group supporting child services in San Francisco, for 18 years.

Yee was a founding member of the Alice Fong Yu Alternative School, the country's first Chinese immersion public school.

=== San Francisco Board of Education ===
Yee began his political career in 2004 by serving as a commissioner for the San Francisco Board of Education and was re-elected in 2008. During his second term, he served as president of the Board of Education.

=== San Francisco Board of Supervisors ===
After Supervisor Sean Elsbernd termed out of office, Yee narrowly defeated F. X. Crowley to become supervisor in the 2012 election by 135 votes.

One of Yee's key issues has been education. In 2018, he co-authored a universal child care proposition which passed as Prop C.

He co-authored Proposition W, which made City College free for San Francisco residents with an increase on the property sales tax on sales that exceeded $5 million.

In the 2016 San Francisco Board of Supervisors election, Yee was re-elected with about 40% of first round votes, and 58% of final round votes.

In 2019, Yee was elected as president of the Board of Supervisors by a vote of 10–1.

== Personal life ==
Yee is married to Cathy Chung, an ESL teacher at City College's Chinatown campus. They have two daughters.

== See also ==
- History of the Chinese Americans in San Francisco
