= Hillary Ronen =

American politician

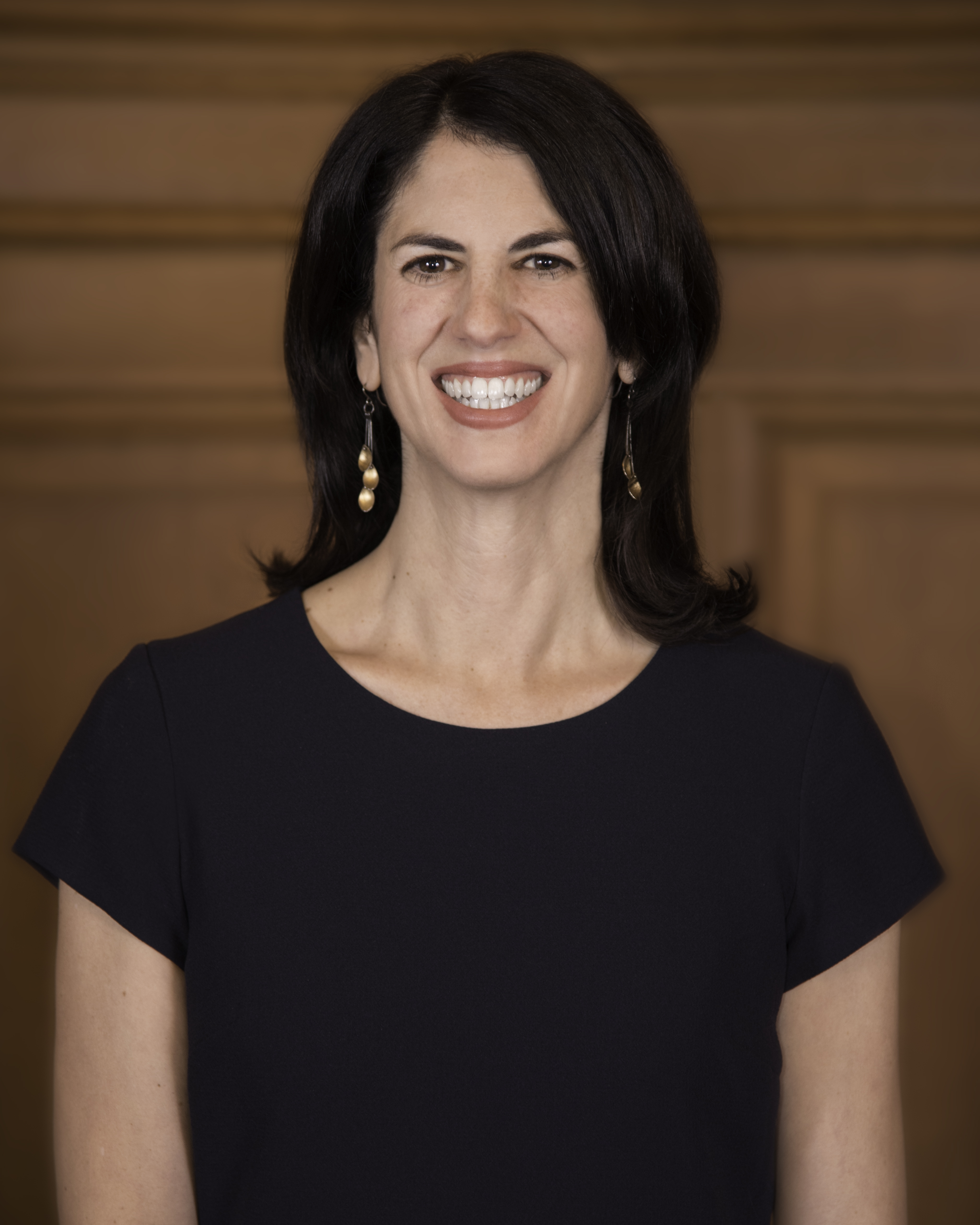
- Official portrait, 2017

Member of the San Francisco Board of Supervisors from District 9
- In office January 9, 2017 – January 8, 2025
- Mayor: Ed Lee; Mark Farrell; London Breed
- Preceded by: David Campos
- Succeeded by: Jackie Fielder

Personal details
- Party: Democratic
- Education: University of California, San Diego (BA); University of California, Berkeley (JD)
- Website: Board of Supervisors; District 9 website

Hillary Ronen is an American politician and attorney who served as a member of the San Francisco Board of Supervisors from 2017 to 2025. She represented District 9, which includes the neighborhoods of Mission District, Bernal Heights, and Portola. Since 2026, she has served as executive director of the San Francisco-based legal nonprofit La Raza Centro Legal.

== Early life and career ==
Hillary Ronen was born to a working-class first-generation immigrant Jewish family. Ronen's father migrated to the United States from Israel in his twenties. Her mother was a schoolteacher.

Ronen has a Bachelor of Arts degree from the University of California, San Diego and her juris doctor from University of California, Berkeley. After graduating from law school, she moved to the Mission District, where she joined La Raza Centro Legal. She worked as an immigrant rights attorney. In 2013, Ronen helped write and pass the California Domestic Workers' Bill of Rights, which mandates overtime pay.

== San Francisco Board of Supervisors ==
Ronen was a legislative aide and chief of staff to Supervisor David Campos. As an aide for Campos, she defended his proposals to prohibit the construction of market-rate housing in parts of San Francisco. Campos could not seek reelection to the Board of Supervisors in 2016 due to term limits. Ronen was elected as his successor in the November 2016 election, defeating Joshua Arce. During the 2016 election campaign, Ronen allied herself with District 1 candidate Sandra Lee Fewer and District 11 candidate Kimberly Alvarenga; the trio pledged if elected to jointly push for a universal preschool program for 4-year-olds, along other priorities.

Ronen was sworn in on January 9, 2017. Her election helped create a female majority on the board for the first time in 20 years.

In 2020, Ronen ran unopposed for reelection; she received 99.77% of the vote, with the remainder of votes being for write-in candidates.

=== Education ===
In 2022 she authored a Charter Amendment "Student Success Fund" which provides $60 million per year in city funds to support a community schools model with the goal of establishing programming in eligible schools to support student academic achievement and social emotional wellness. Funding for the Student Success Fund, while drawn from the San Francisco General Fund, redirects monies from excess Educational Revenue Augmentation Funds that San Francisco receives from the State of California that are intended to fund educational purposes. The Charter Amendment passed the Board of Supervisors with unanimous support, and went onto the 2022 November Ballot as Proposition G. The ballot measure passed with 77.78% of the vote.

=== Housing ===
In April 2017, Ronen introduced legislation to count children as tenants for purposes of relocation payments under Ellis Act evictions.

In 2018, Ronen fought to prevent the construction of a 75-unit building on the site of a laundromat. She argued that an environmental review of the building did not consider the impact of a shadow on a nearby schoolyard, even though an environmental review conducted by officials at the San Francisco Planning Department showed that the new construction, including its shadow, would not have an adverse impact on children at the schoolyard. A few months later, Ronen dropped her opposition, stating that the appeal process seeking to halt the project had been exhausted, thus allowing the project to proceed.

In 2019, she co-sponsored a resolution opposing California Senate Bill 50, which would have required local governments to allow denser housing near public transit stations and jobs centers in order to reduce the housing shortage in California.

In 2019, Ronen introduced legislation to close loopholes around tenant buyout laws that have historically become a form of tenant abuse, intimidation, and de facto eviction.

In October 2021, Ronen voted against the construction of a 495-unit apartment complex (one-quarter of which were designated as affordable housing) on a Nordstrom's valet parking lot next to a BART station. Her vote was unusual, as she was blocking construction of housing in the district of another supervisors. The norm on the board is generally to honor the wishes of the district supervisor, who in this case was Matt Haney, a supporter of the proposed construction. After the vote, The San Francisco Chronicle editorial board wrote that the Board of Supervisors "have lost their minds on housing" and that San Francisco "needs a Board of Supervisors that won't sabotage any and seemingly all earnest attempts to deal with this city's housing crisis." The California Department of Housing and Community Development began an investigation into whether the San Francisco Board of Supervisors acted improperly in its decision to block the housing project. Ronen defended her vote, saying she was "pro-housing."

Ronen was an opponent of a proposed market-rate housing development at 1979 Mission Street, which was proposed in 2019 to be built on a block of shuttered retail at a tract next to the 16th Street Mission station. The project, by Crescent Heights, was intensely controversial. In 2021, Ronen and Breed introduced legislation to approval a deal in which Crescent Heights would transfer the site to the city to fulfill its affordable housing mandate for a different project (a tower at South Van Ness Avenue), and the city would then build 330 low-income housing units on the site. Ronen hailed the agreement as a win for affordable housing.

=== Mental Health SF ===
In 2019, Ronen proposed Mental Health SF legislation along with Supervisor Matt Haney. Mayor London Breed and the Board of Supervisors reached a compromise agreement on the mental health reform effort. The final legislation passed focuses on creating a universal system of mental health services, substance use treatment, and psychiatric medications to San Franciscans who need help. The five key components of Mental Health SF include, the establishment of a Mental Health Service Center, establishment of an Office of Coordinated Care, the establishment of the 24/7 crisis response street team, the expansion of Mental Health and Substance Use Treatment, and the establishment of the Office of Private Health Insurance Accountability.

In October 2019, Ronen worked with San Francisco City workers to reach a deal to keep the Adult Residential Facility open for people with severe mental illness. In August 2019, the San Francisco Department of Public Health planned on displacing dozens of patients from the Adult Residential Facility, the only City-operated board and care option for people with severe mental illness. Ronen drafted and introduced legislation to ensure that these beds would be used as intended, providing a safe and secure place for people who would otherwise be on the street. In October, Ronen, along with front-line staff, representatives from Local 21 and SEIU 1021, DPH leadership, residents and their families, and the Mayor's office worked together to reach an agreement and pass legislation to ensure the future of the Adult Residential Facility.

=== Crime and policing ===
In 2020, during the George Floyd protests, Ronen was a vocal proponent of cuts to the San Francisco Police Department's budget. She criticized Mayor London Breed's proposal in 2020 for a 2.6% decrease to the law enforcement budget as a "slap in the face" and called for deeper cuts. In October 2022, Ronen repeated calls for cuts to the SFPD (whose budget at the time was up 4.4% from its 2019 levels).

Ronen has opposed proposals to fill vacancies within SFPD, or to set minimum SFPD staffing levels, and rejected Police Chief Bill Scott's assessment that there is a understaffing crisis within the department. She has contended that Mayor Breed has given too much focus to police department vacancies at the expenses of vacancies in other city departments, such as the San Francisco Department of Public Health. Ronen has also clashed with Scott after a series of San Francisco Chronicle reports showed that some SFPD officers ignored crimes in progress or failed to properly investigate them. In a letter to Scott, Ronen wrote that reports of officer apathy "indicate a systemic breakdown in your department" and suggested a "deliberate work stoppage"; Scott denied that this was the case.

In March 2023, following a series of high-profile crimes in the city, Ronen demanded more police presence in the Mission within her district. Rosen's reversal prompted critics to accuse her of hypocrisy; in response, Ronen criticized the police department for logging more than 100,000 overtime hours through mid-2023 patrolling Union Square and other shopping areas, rather than other parts of the city.

In 2023, Ronen apologized for her role in aiding Fernando Madrigal, who was a member of the Norteños gang and simultaneously an activist who promoted reform of the criminal justice and juvenile justice systems. In July 2019, Madrigal fatally shot a 15-year-old bystander with an AR-15 while hunting members of rival gangs; before he was implicated in the killing, Ronen appeared with Madrigal at a rally on the steps of San Francisco City Hall, and Ronen wrote a letter to a court supporting Madrigal's petition for early release from his probation for a previous carjacking conviction. After Madrigal was arrested and pleaded guilty to the killing, Ronen tearfully apologized to the victim's mother, saying that she was horrified to discover that Madrigal had murdered the teenager and that she had "no idea" of the degree of Madrigal's gang involvement.

== Later career ==
In 2026, Ronen returned to La Raza Centro Legal to serve as executive director.

== Personal life ==
Ronen is married to attorney Francisco Ugarte. They live in the Bernal Heights neighborhood with their daughter.
