= Chinese Progressive Association (San Francisco) =

The Chinese Progressive Association (CPA) is a non-profit civil rights organization founded in 1972 in San Francisco, California, that advocates for the social and political rights of working-class immigrant Chinese Americans.

== History ==
Its origins are in the civil rights movements of the 1960s and 1970s in the United States; its founders were participants in the Asian American Movement. While CPA has multiple locations in the United States, each branch tailors its work to serve the community needs specific to its location. In San Francisco, CPA advocates for tenants' and workers' rights, youth and student political engagement, and civic engagement.

From its founding, the Chinese Progressive Association has been a notable political influence in the local Chinese American community. The increase of Chinese American political involvement in the late 20th century is attributed in large part to the efforts of organizations like the CPA to engage working-class Chinese Americans in local activism. The CPA was also one of the main Asian American organizations to support the campaign to save the International Hotel in 1972, an issue that notably united the local Asian American community in the West Coast of the United States. More recently, the CPA has successfully advocated for the passage of city ordinances protecting low-wage workers, like the Minimum Wage Ordinance (2003), the Minimum Wage Implementation and Enforcement Ordinance (2006), and the Wage Theft Prevention Ordinance (2011).
