= Outer Mission, San Francisco =

Coordinates: 37°42′40″N 122°27′4″W

Outer Mission
- Neighborhood of San Francisco
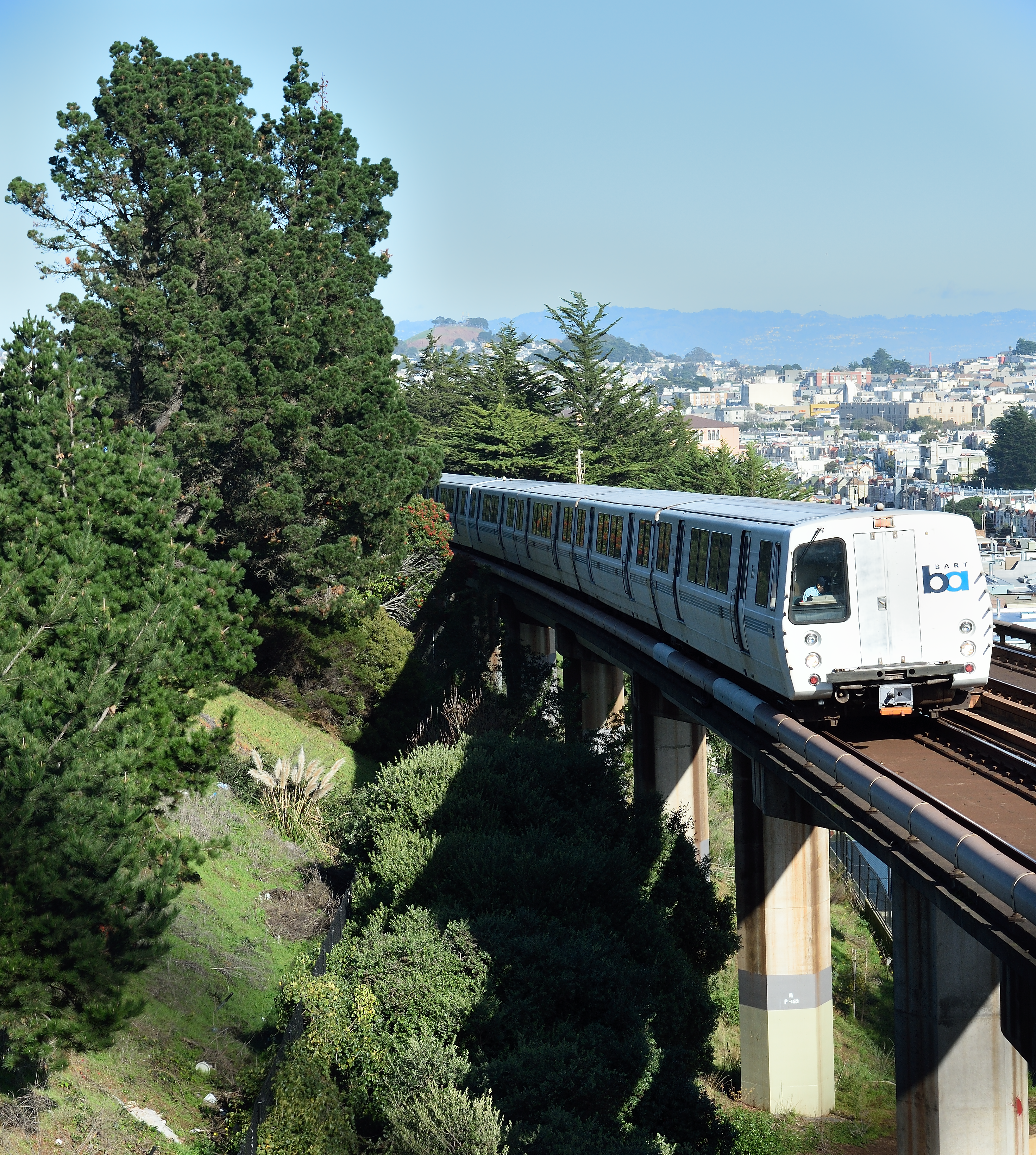
- A southbound BART train passes San Francisco's Outer Mission neighborhood, between the Balboa Park station and the Daly City station.
- Nickname: Cayuga Terrace
- Interactive map of Outer Mission

Government
  - Supervisor: Chyanne Chen
  - Assemblymember: Catherine Stefani (D)
  - State Senator: Scott Wiener (D)
  - U. S. Rep.: Aisha Wahab (D)

Area
  - Total: 1.11 km^{2} (0.429 sq mi)
  - Land: 1.11 km^{2} (0.429 sq mi)

Population (2008)
  - Total: 8,546
  - Density: 7,688/km^{2} (19,913/sq mi)
- ZIP Code: 94112
- Area codes: 415/628

Outer Mission is a small residential neighborhood on the south edge of San Francisco, bounded by Geneva Avenue (on the northeast), Interstate 280 (on the northwest), Mission Street (on the southwest), and the city of Daly City (on the south). It is bordered by the Mission Terrace, Crocker-Amazon, and Ingleside, and touches Excelsior (at the corner of Mission Street and Geneva Avenue). The Muni streetcar historic "car barn" is at the northern corner of this neighborhood. Cayuga Park is located in this neighborhood. The Cayuga Improvement Association (CIA) covers the area bounded by Interstate 280, Mission Street, Sickles and Onondaga. Some folks have attempted to define "Cayuga Terrace" as a subset neighborhood of the larger Mission Terrace neighborhood.

== Location ==
The Outer Mission is a neighborhood in Southeast San Francisco with boundaries of Interstate 280 to the west, Geneva Avenue to the north, and Mission Street and the Daly City border to the south. Its surrounding neighborhoods in San Francisco include Ingleside to the west, Mission Terrace to the north, Excelsior to the northeast, and Crocker-Amazon to the southeast. Daly City is to the south and southwest.

The name Outer Mission often causes confusion, leading some to believe that Outer Mission is immediately south of Mission District (in reality, Bernal Heights is directly south of Mission). Some call any and all neighborhoods south of Mission the "Outer Mission area," which results in further confusion. Outer Mission is southwest of Geneva Avenue, and due west of the Cow Palace.

== History ==
The Outer Mission was developed around the 1910s as an extension of the nearby Mission District. The area was serviced by the Southern Pacific Railroad. Before the area was developed it largely consisted of farms, providing the city with Swiss chard and potatoes. Like the Mission, many of its original residents were of Irish and Italian descent.

== Attractions and characteristics ==
The neighborhood is near Cayuga Park and playground, a unique park beneath the BART tracks, featuring dense vegetation and over 100 whimsical wood statues carved by the park's creator, along with a small baseball field and tennis courts.

Most of the area contains single-family residences that are often attached and have a small fenced back yard.

The 1990s to 2000s housing bubble and its subsequent gentrification led to many Latino/Chicano and Asian/Filipino families to move into the area: It remains one of the few low-rent and middle class enclaves in San Francisco.

Due to this shift in demographics, a very common practice in this neighborhood is the construction of an in-law apartment in part of the garage space (often consisting of an additional bedroom, bathroom and kitchen, with the side entry used as the in-law's door). The owner of the building then often rents out this in-law unit to supplement his or her income or mortgage payment. Because of this, there is a relatively high percentage of renters in this neighborhood, despite consisting almost exclusively of single family homes. The in-laws very often are unwarranted (done without a city permit), resulting in a higher population density than the neighborhood was built for or the city would allow. This has some undesirable side effects such as the streets (and even the sidewalks) filling up with cars.

Outer Mission houses originally featured front yards or small planting areas in front of the property. Over the years, many homeowners paved over their planting areas, to allow them to park cars on the sidewalk. This has made the streets less attractive; as the city has recently encouraged residents to (re-)create planting areas and plant trees in front of their homes, front yards are on the rise again.

The neighborhood is well served by public transportation and is adjacent to the I-280, one of San Francisco's two major freeways. The BART line through the city runs adjacent to the Outer Mission. As the tracks are above-ground, the trains are visible and audible throughout most of the neighborhood. The neighborhood is in walking distance to Balboa Park Station, which is one of the city's largest public transportation hubs, being served by BART, three Muni Metro lines (J-Church, K-Ingleside, M-Oceanview) and many bus lines (including some of the nightly Owl lines).

The main bus line serving the Outer Mission is the 14 Mission: The bus line operates along the full length of Mission Street (from Embarcadero to Daly City). In addition to the 14, during peak hours, Muni runs two variations: the 14R Mission Rapid (rapid, fewer stops) and the 14X Mission Express, (Express, takes the freeway to and from downtown). During peak hours, the 88 BART Shuttle Muni line passes through the Outer Mission and can be used to get to Balboa Park quickly and directly. Finally, the numerous bus lines that run along Geneva Avenue (most prominently the 8 Bayshore, 8BX Bayshore Express, 54 Felton and the 43 Masonic) are easily accessible from the neighborhood.

In addition to Muni, SamTrans operates several of its lines on Mission Street which can be used to get to destinations on the Peninsula.

While bicycling is not as widespread as in other neighborhoods (such as the Mission), it is popular with some residents. Well marked and wide bike lanes exist along most of Alemany Blvd.
