= Saikat Chakrabarti =

American political activist (born 1986)

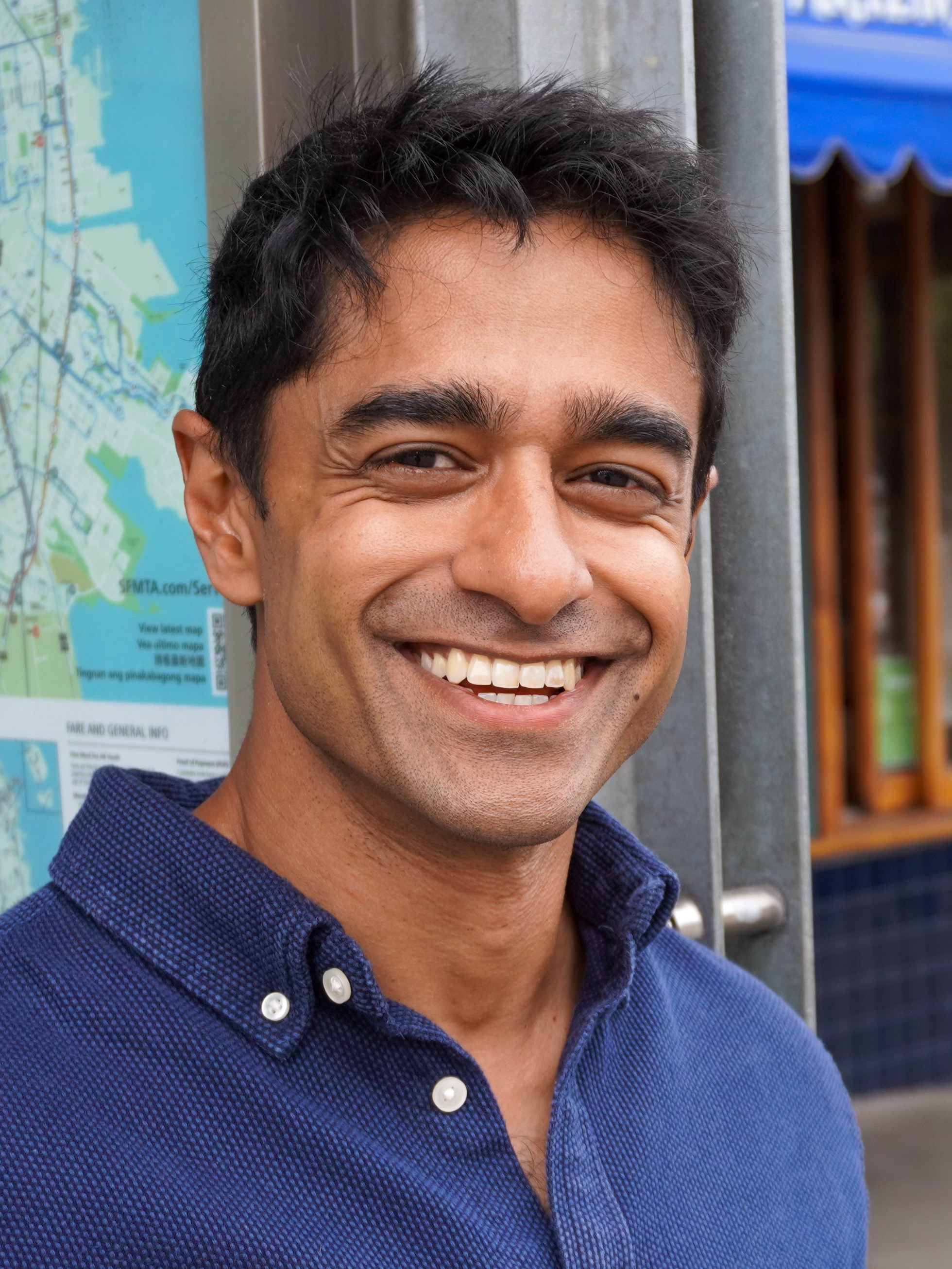
- Chakrabarti in 2025
- Born: January 12, 1986 (age 40); Fort Worth, Texas, U.S.
- Education: Harvard University (BA)
- Political party: Democratic
- Spouse: Kamilka Malwatte
- Children: 1
- Website: Campaign website

Saikat Chakrabarti (Shoy-cot Choc-rah-bartee, born January 12, 1986) is an American political advisor, climate policy advocate, and software engineer. A progressive Democrat, Chakrabarti co-founded Justice Democrats, which powered Alexandria Ocasio-Cortez's successful insurgent challenge to Representative Joe Crowley, and Chakrabarti served as her campaign manager. He then served as chief of staff to Ocasio-Cortez, who became the U.S. representative from New York's 14th congressional district, in 2019.

Chakrabarti left Ocasio-Cortez's office to run New Consensus, a group promoting the Green New Deal, whose development he led. He ran an unsuccessful campaign to succeed former House Speaker Nancy Pelosi as the representative for California's 11th congressional district in the 2026 U.S House election. Chakrabarti was a founding engineer at Stripe, Inc. and began his political career as the director of organizing technology for Senator Bernie Sanders' 2016 presidential campaign, which he joined in its early stages.

== Early life and career ==
Chakrabarti was born into an Indian Bengali Hindu family in 1986 to Samir and Sima Chakrabarti in Fort Worth, Texas. Chakrabarti's mother was native to Kolkata, Bengal Presidency. His father, Samir, was born in Dhaka, one year prior to the Partition of India and later sought refuge with his parents and nine siblings in Kolkata, India. Samir married a local girl, establishing a new family. Chakrabarti's parents immigrated to New York City in 1979 where Saikat's older sister, Urmi, was born.

Chakrabarti graduated from Paul Laurence Dunbar High School in Fort Worth in 2003. He then went on to attend Harvard University, graduating in 2007 with a Bachelor of Arts (BA) in computer science. Chakrabarti worked at investment management firm Bridgewater Associates, followed by six years in Silicon Valley at a number of startups. Chakrabarti co-founded a web design company called Mockingbird and served as the second engineer at the payments processing company Stripe. According to his financial disclosures, Chakrabarti holds at least $50 million worth of equity in Stripe.

== Political career and policy positions ==
=== Bernie Sanders campaign and Brand New Congress ===
In 2015, Chakrabarti joined the early stages of U.S. Senator Bernie Sanders's presidential campaign. Of that decision, Chakrabarti told Rolling Stone, "I wasn't entirely sure he had all the right solutions but I knew he was talking about the right problems."

Chakrabarti became the Sanders campaign's director of organizing technology and was part of the effort that created technology for grassroots supporters to collaborate on organizing events. Together with Sheena Pakanati, he developed a messaging tool called Spoke which was released under the MIT license. The software helped volunteers find other volunteers who lived nearby and helped coordinate "millions" of volunteers to call into battleground states, multiplying the effort of local volunteers and staff. Chakrabarti's technological edge is credited with being "a major component in the success of Sanders' presidential run".

During the Sanders campaign, Chakrabarti worked closely with Alexandra Rojas and Corbin Trent to stage campaign events around the country. Chakrabarti told Rolling Stone that he often heard voters express strong concerns about Congress: "people would say, 'How's he going to get anything done? We just saw what Congress did to Obama for the last eight years, they're gonna do the same thing to Bernie.'" As a result, in the spring of 2016, Chakrabarti (together with Rojas and Trent) co-founded the Brand New Congress political action committee, to recruit 400 new candidates for Congress. Chakrabarti told Rachel Maddow in 2016, the goal was to have unified fundraising of small donors modeled on the Sanders campaign in hopes of politicians who work for their voters rather than spend their time seeking donations. The group received many applications and recruited 12 candidates, of whom Alexandria Ocasio-Cortez won a seat in Congress.

=== Justice Democrats ===
In early 2017, after Trump's election, Chakrabarti, Zack Exley, a former fellow Bernie Sanders presidential campaign executive, Cenk Uygur of The Young Turks and Kyle Kulinski of Secular Talk became co-founders of Justice Democrats. As Chakrabarti, Rojas, and Trent were less involved with Brand New Congress, they became leaders of Justice Democrats. Chakrabarti, as an executive director of Justice Democrats, wrote software to organize in a "distributed fashion". Justice Democrats targeted an entrenched "corporate Democrat" in Joe Crowley. The group recruited Ocasio-Cortez to challenge Joe Crowley and "helped get her campaign off the ground, build an email list and raise $30,000." Activist strategies mobilized by Justice Democrats contributed greatly to Alexandria Ocasio-Cortez's primary win, according to The Intercept.

"From day one, these volunteers started knocking doors and reaching into their own networks to expand this volunteer army, allowing us to go into election day with over a thousand volunteers willing to mobilize voters. We buttressed door-knocking with a heavy digital, phone calling, and texting strategy that targeted progressive voters in five different languages. Through this, we built a multiracial, progressive coalition of voters who had been hearing our message for a year and were excited to turn out to vote on June 26."

Before U.S. Senator Al Franken resigned, Chakrabarti went on record to push for his resignation and expressed his support for Keith Ellison as his replacement.

=== Alexandria Ocasio-Cortez chief of staff ===
Chakrabarti was campaign manager for Ocasio-Cortez's unexpected primary victory over 10-term incumbent Joe Crowley, and afterwards became her campaign chair. While her general election victory in the heavily Democratic district was considered a foregone conclusion, Chakrabarti leveraged her newfound high profile to campaign for other progressive candidates across the country. After she won the November 2018 general election, she appointed him as her chief of staff.

In 2019, Chakrabarti was named to the Politico Playbook power list to watch.

==== Green New Deal ====
Chakrabarti led the Ocasio-Cortez staff and several progressive groups in writing the Green New Deal resolution that was submitted to the House of Representatives by Ocasio-Cortez and to the Senate by Ed Markey February 7, 2019. The New Yorker quoted him as saying, "We spent the weekend learning how to put laws together. We looked up how to write resolutions." The Washington Post quoted him as well:

"it wasn't originally a climate thing at all ... we really think of it as a how-do-you-change-the-entire-economy thing."

Chakrabarti expressed a vision of what Democrats should try to do while Republicans hold power in the Senate and Presidency:

"Don't expect them to back down . . . Another thing to really do over the next two years is to basically show the American people what will be possible if the Democrats win the House, the Senate and the presidency in 2020, and that means putting our best foot forward. It means putting the most ambitious, the boldest, the biggest things we can, and then just build a movement around that."

Relating that to the policies Ocasio-Cortez proposes and supports via Twitter, Chakrabarti told Brian Stelter on CNN's "Reliable Sources":

"She's able to do things very quickly because she has a pulse on where the people are."

Chakrabarti publicly supported Bilal Mahmood's run as a Democrat for California's 17th State Assembly district in a 2022 special election on September 30, 2021. Together, he and Mahmood planned an environmental framework similar to the Green New Deal for California, including a carbon tax to fund zero-interest loans for green retrofits.

==== Amazon HQ2 withdrawal from Queens ====
In February 2019, Chakrabarti appeared as a guest on Bloomberg News to clarify Ocasio-Cortez's role in Amazon's decision to pull its planned HQ2 from Long Island City, Queens, saying she objected to the process by which it had received its original deal, but had no specific animus toward the company. He stated that AOC's goal had been to see the local community more involved in discussions, but once community members joined the discussion, Amazon made the decision to withdraw. Chakrabarti elaborated further that Amazon would be welcome to return to the negotiating table under the condition that the company engage adequately with the local communities to be affected by the project.

==== Immigration reform ====
Chakrabarti worked on the part of the Justice Democrats platform which included abolishing ICE. To the question of whether a different agency should take its place, he replied "everyone has a different idea of what happens after".

In a 2019 tweet, Chakrabarti wrote that the New Democrats and Blue Dog Caucus should be called "the New Southern Democrats" for voting to "enable a racist system". This was in response to Democratic representatives approving an aid package which included funding for southern border enforcement. The House Democratic Caucus Twitter account, managed by Hakeem Jeffries, objected to his referring to Sharice Davids by name in these posts and attacked him for his perceived targeting of a Native American woman and person of color.

==== Resignation as chief of staff ====
On August 2, 2019, Representative Ocasio-Cortez announced that Saikat Chakrabarti "has decided to leave the office to work with New Consensus to further develop plans for a Green New Deal." That same day, in an interview with The Intercept, Chakrabarti said he would be starting work with New Consensus, an organization dedicated to the Green New Deal, the congresswoman's "ambitious climate, economic, and racial justice agenda."

=== Housing ===
Chakrabarti supports an "all-of-the-above" approach to combat the housing crisis in the United States. He has advocated cutting "red tape to accelerate development", increasing funding "for low-income housing" and creating a federal agency to provide "low-interest financing to pay for home construction." Chakrabarti has also criticized the "tribal politics" surrounding the housing and cost-of-living crises in San Francisco, arguing that such dynamics have worsened these problems instead of encouraging engagement with fresh ideas.

=== 2026 congressional campaign ===
Campaign logo

On February 5, 2025, Chakrabarti announced his candidacy for California's 11th congressional district in 2026, challenging former House Speaker Nancy Pelosi in the Democratic primary. In his announcement, he affirmed his respect for Pelosi, but stated, "it's become clear to me that the Democratic Party needs new leadership," and added that Democratic congressional leaders were "paralyzed and unprepared" for the second Trump presidency.

On November 6, 2025, Pelosi announced that she would not be seeking re-election for her seat, leaving it open for the first time in 40 years. State senator Scott Wiener and supervisor Connie Chan also announced campaigns for the seat. In March 2026, Justice Democrats backed his campaign. Numerous media outlets noted that his former employer, Rep. Alexandria Ocasio-Cortez, declined to endorse him and avoided mentioning him in interviews.

Among the election issues were Chakrabarti's residence. He first moved to San Francisco in 2009. In 2018, he bought a house in Gaithersburg, Maryland, and identified it as his principal place of residence, both on loan forms and on more than one Maryland tax form. Chakrabarti said that he bought the home for his parents, never actually lived there, and only stayed there for periods of a couple of months at most.

On June 3, 2026, Chakrabarti ended his congressional campaign after early results in the jungle primary showed him in a distant third place.

== Personal life ==
Chakrabarti is married to Kamilka Malwatte; they have a daughter, born in 2019. In December 2025, Business Insider estimated his net worth to be at least $167 million primarily from equity in Stripe.
