= Myrna Melgar =

American politician (born 1968)

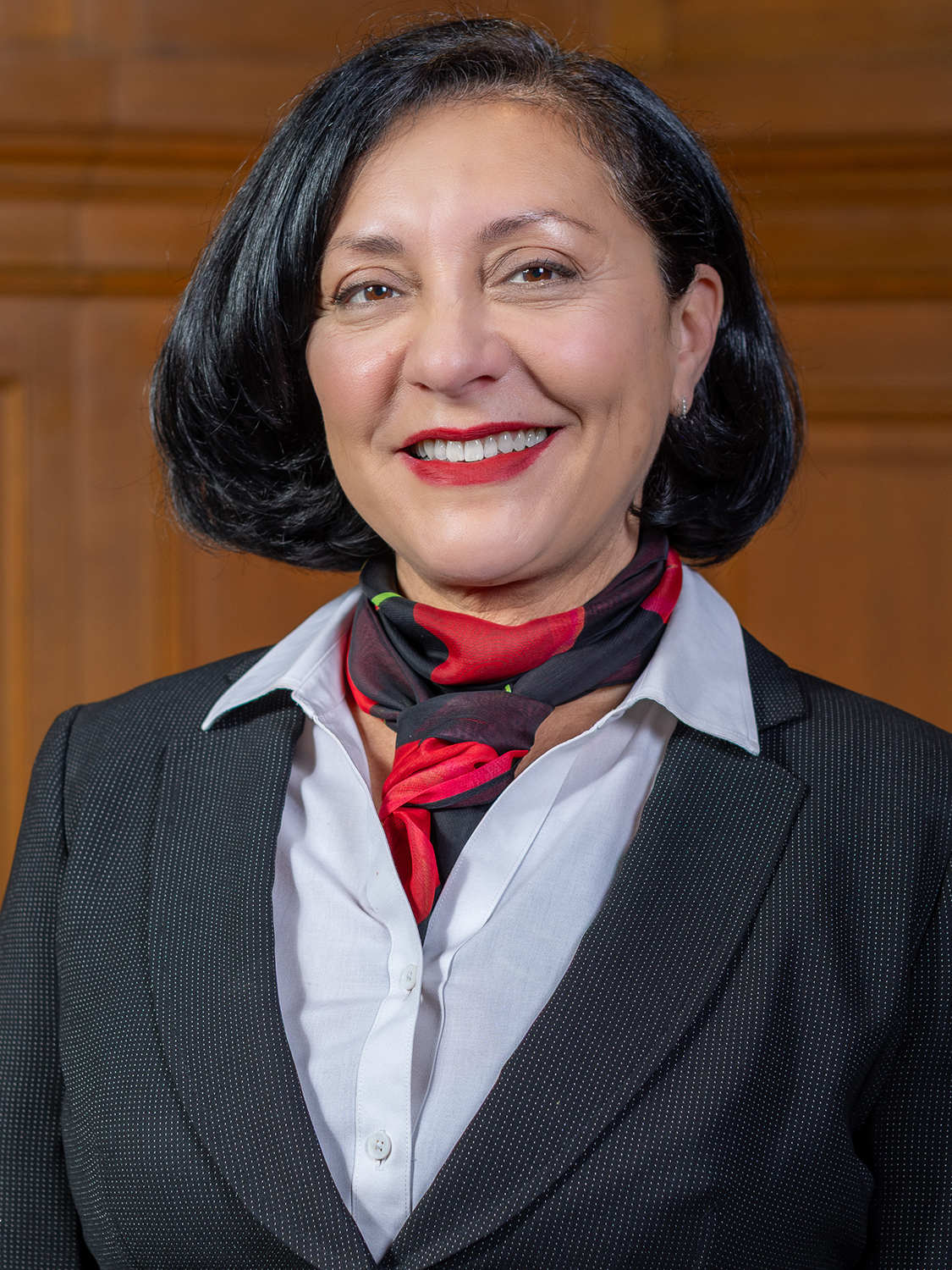
- Official portrait, 2025

Member of the San Francisco Board of Supervisors from the 7th district
- Incumbent
- Assumed office January 8, 2021
- Preceded by: Norman Yee

Personal details
- Born: March 16, 1968 (age 58) El Salvador
- Party: Democratic
- Education: San Francisco State University (attended); Excelsior University (BA); Columbia University (MUP)
- Website: Board website

Myrna Melgar (born March 17, 1968) is an American politician currently serving as a member of the San Francisco Board of Supervisors for District 7 since January 8, 2021. Melgar is the first woman elected to represent District 7.

== Early life and education ==
Melgar was born in El Salvador. Her mother, who gave birth to her at 16, was a communist militant. Her father was a civil engineer and a business owner who came from a conservative family of Jewish immigrants. When Melgar was just six years old, her mother left the family to become a revolutionary combatant in the Salvadoran Civil War. Melgar's parents divorced and the family moved in with Melgar's paternal grandfather in Las Mercedes, an upper-middle class neighborhood of San Salvador.

When Melgar was 12 years old, her father was targeted in an assassination attempt. He survived, but within two weeks the family dropped everything and fled their home. They settled in a studio apartment in the Mission District of San Francisco. Her father worked odd jobs such as cleaning offices and delivering pizzas, and her stepmother was a nanny.

Eventually, Melgar's father learned enough English to earn his civil engineering license in the United States. He got a well-paying job in Redwood City, where he relocated the family. Melgar and her sisters attended Woodside High School, where she says they were the only Latino students at the school.

Later on, she attended San Francisco State University and graduated from Excelsior College, earning a bachelor's degree in Liberal Arts and a master's degree in Urban Planning from Columbia University.

In Meglar's early 20s, she learned that her mom had taken asylum in Sweden. She flew out to meet her and ended up living with her in Sweden for two years.

== Career ==
Melgar formerly worked as the executive director of the Jamestown Community Center, Deputy Director of the Mission Economic Development Agency, Director of Homeownership Programs at the Mayor's Office of Housing during the Newsom Administration, and served as President of the City Planning Commission and Vice President of the Building Inspection Commission. Melgar also served as a legislative aid to Eric Mar.

== San Francisco Board of Supervisors ==
Melgar was elected Supervisor for District 7 on November 3, 2020, with 18,561 total votes after ranked-choice allocations, garnering 53.1% of the vote. She was sworn into office on January 8, 2021, replacing former Supervisor and President of the Board Norman Yee, who endorsed her as his successor.

Melgar chairs the Land Use and Transportation Committee of the Board and serves on the Youth, Young Adult, and Families Committee, and the Public Safety and Neighborhood Services Committee. Melgar is also a Commissioner for the County Transportation Authority, Bay Area Air Quality District, and the First Five Commission.

Melgar has advocated for the expansion of the "Free Muni for Youth" program to all youth in August 2021.

=== Housing ===
In 2021, Melgar voted to block construction of a 495-unit apartment building with 25% affordable housing on the site of a valet parking lot. The controversial vote prompted an investigation of the San Francisco Board of Supervisors by California state officials.

In 2023, Melgar voted to halt the conversion of a single-family home in Nob Hill into ten townhomes over concerns of contaminated soils. In 2024, she voted against anti-housing legislation that would restrict housing supply in San Francisco's Northern Waterfront.

In July 2025, Melgar sponsored legislation on behalf of Mayor Daniel Lurie to place a 2-hour limit on oversized vehicles parked around the City, and introduce two programs to support individuals living out of recreational vehicles (RVs). Both programs will allow the city to follow and provide more targeted resources to RV dwellers, while encouraging more permanent living solutions.

== Personal life ==
Melgar resides in the Ingleside Terraces neighborhood with her husband, environmental lawyer Sean H. Donahue, and three daughters.

Melgar is of Jewish descent, but did not grow up in the faith as her paternal grandfather had converted to Southern Baptism. As an adult, Melgar has worked to reintegrate Judaism into her and her family's lives.
