= Crocker-Amazon, San Francisco =

Neighborhood of San Francisco, US

Crocker Amazon
- Neighborhood
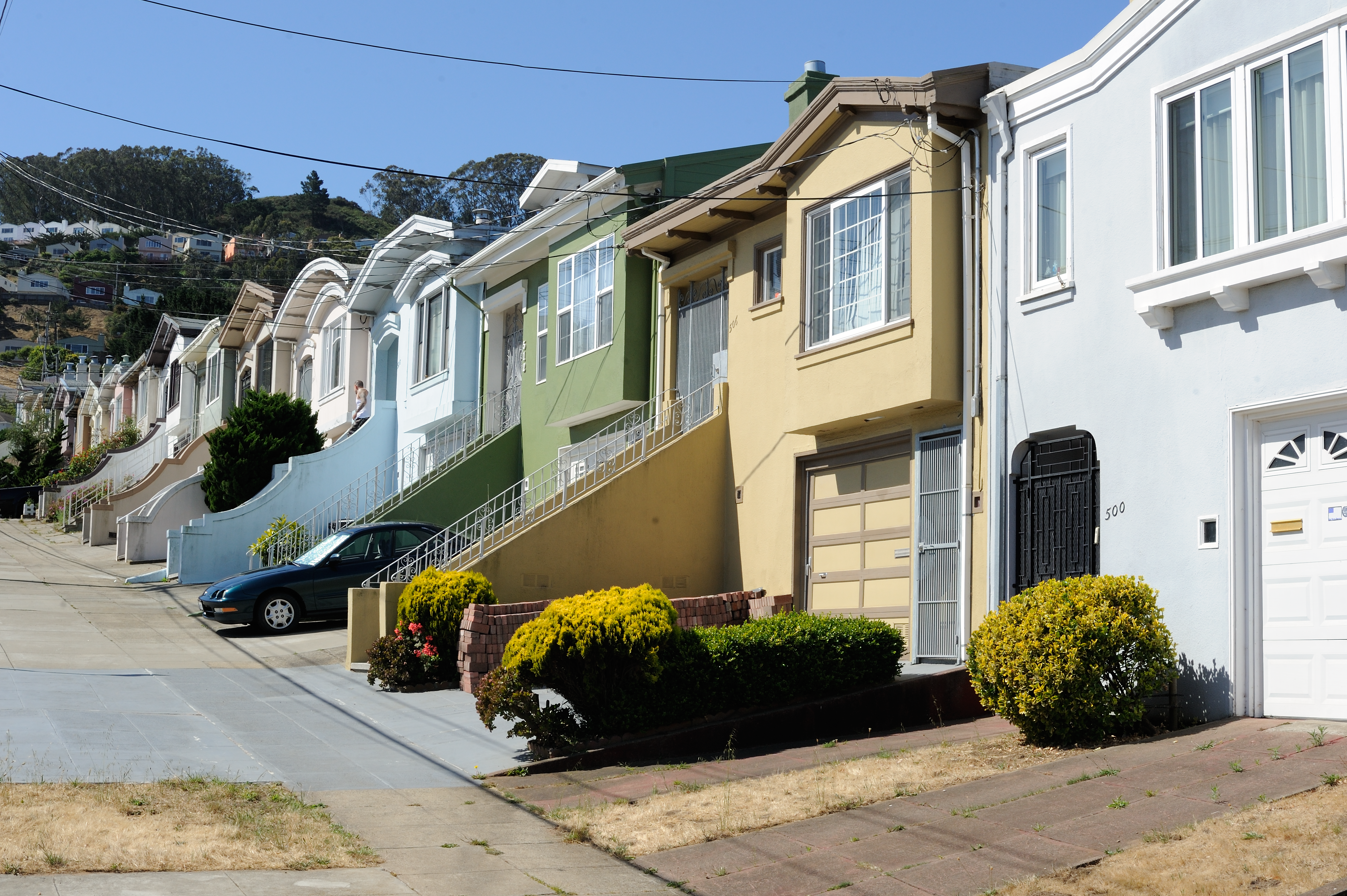
- Row houses in Crocker Amazon district, with Daly City's Southern Hills neighborhood in the background

- Location within San Francisco
- Coordinates: 37.71282°N 122.43945°W
- Country: United States
- State: California
- Municipality: San Francisco

Government
  - Supervisor: Chyanne Chen
  - Assemblymember: Catherine Stefani (D)
  - State Senator: Scott Wiener (D)
  - U. S. Rep.: Kevin Mullin (D)

Area
  - Total: 0.568 sq mi (1.47 km^{2})
  - Land: 0.568 sq mi (1.47 km^{2})

Population (2008)
  - Total: 11,902
  - Density: 20,957/sq mi (8,092/km^{2})
- ZIP Code: 94112
- Area codes: 415/628

Crocker-Amazon is a neighborhood in San Francisco that borders the Excelsior District. Crocker-Amazon covers the area south of Mission Street and Geneva Avenue, extending toward suburban Daly City. The neighborhood is adjacent to Crocker-Amazon Park, named after the Charles Crocker land holdings that once made up the area, and Amazon Avenue in the Excelsior. The winding streets of the neighborhood straddle the border between San Francisco and Daly City and largely blend in with the adjacent Daly City neighborhoods of Crocker and Southern Hills.

== Attractions and characteristics ==
The Crocker-Amazon neighborhood is slightly more affluent than the Excelsior, but retains much of the same racial diversity, including a large Filipino community. The majority of the neighborhood consists of single-family homes.

Crocker-Amazon Park borders the neighborhood to the north. It has four playgrounds and recently renovated and lighted soccer and baseball fields. Adjacent to the east of Crocker-Amazon park is McLaren Park, San Francisco's third largest park after Golden Gate and the Presidio. It has a golf course, two lakes, jogging and hiking trails, a public pool, an old reservoir that is used as a dog swimming area, and the Jerry Garcia Amphitheater which houses concerts and festivals.

The neighborhood benefits from some of the most varied weather in the city, with a balance of sun and fog. The top of the neighborhood boasts outstanding views of downtown San Francisco in the gap between McLaren Park and Twin Peaks. Parts of the neighborhood, particularly heading toward Southern Hills, feature free-standing single-family homes with at least 10 feet on either side (in many San Francisco neighborhoods, there is a gap of no more than a few inches between homes). The diverse architecture of the homes throughout the neighborhood include Marina, Arts & Crafts, Victorian, Edwardian, and Mid-Century Modern styles.

The area is well-served by public transportation. MUNI Routes 8 Bayshore, or 8BX Bayshore B Express, and 54 Felton serve the Geneva Avenue corridor and the 43 Masonic bus also serves Geneva Avenue, as well as Naples, Cordova, and Munich Streets. During rush hour, the Balboa Park Bart Station is only about a five-minute drive, an eight-minute bus ride, or a 15-minute walk. The neighborhood is convenient to nearby Interstate 280, and to the Alemany Boulevard thoroughfare. Crocker-Amazon is served by two elementary schools, Guadalupe and Longfellow.

Geneva Avenue and Mission Street, which bound the neighborhood, feature commercial businesses, including a barber shop and a separate barber school, an optometrist, pizzerias, pharmacies, a hardware store and a vegetable market. The area also features a growing number of restaurants and cafes, many featuring various types of Mexican and Latin American (particularly Salvadoran) cuisine.
