= 2026 San Francisco Board of Supervisors election =

- June 2, 2026 and November 3, 2026

5 of the 11 seats of the San Francisco Board of Supervisors
Party	Democratic
Current seats	11
Incumbent President
Rafael Mandelman

The 2026 San Francisco Board of Supervisors election was held on November 3, 2026, to elect five of the eleven members of the San Francisco Board of Supervisors. The election was conducted with ranked-choice voting.

Two seats filled by mayoral appointments were contested in a special election on June 2, 2026. The seats were contested again in the November general election.

== District 2 ==
=== Special election ===
San Francisco's 2nd supervisorial district special election
- June 2, 2026

Candidate	Stephen Sherrill	Lori Brooke
First round	15,760; 69.20%	6,998; 30.73%
Maximum round	15,766; 69.25%	7,001; 30.75%
Supervisor before election
Stephen Sherrill
Elected Supervisor
Stephen Sherrill

Incumbent supervisor Stephen Sherrill was appointed in December 2024 by Mayor London Breed after Catherine Stefani was elected to the California State Assembly. After winning the special election on June 2, 2026, Sherrill was re-elected to serve a full four-year term on November 3, 2026. District 2 includes the Marina, Pacific Heights, Cow Hollow, and Presidio Heights.

==== Candidates ====
===== Declared =====
- Lori Brooke, co-founder of Neighborhoods United SF
- Stephen Sherrill, incumbent supervisor
- Monthanus Ratanapakdee, executive director of the Justice for Vicha Ratanapakdee Foundation (write-in)

===== Withdrew =====
- Jeremy Kirshner, attorney and Burlingame, California deputy city manager

==== Endorsements ====
Lori Brooke

State legislators

- Mark Leno, former SD-11 (2008–2016)

Local officials

- Michela Alioto-Pier, former supervisor from the 2nd district (2004–2011)
- Quentin Kopp, former supervisor (1972–1986)

Labor unions

- American Federation of Teachers Local 2121

Political parties

- California Working Families Party

Newspapers

- San Francisco Bay Guardian
Stephen Sherrill

Local officials

- Daniel Lurie, mayor of San Francisco (2025–present)

Labor unions

- Nor Cal Carpenters Union
- San Francisco Police Officers Association

Newspapers

- Bay Area Reporter
- San Francisco Chronicle

==== Results ====
2026 District 2 supervisorial special election
Candidate	Votes	%
Stephen Sherrill (incumbent)	15,755	69.20
Lori Brooke	6,997	30.73
Monthamus Ratanapakdee	15	0.07
Total votes	22,767	100.00
Ranked choice voting — Pass 4
Stephen Sherrill (incumbent)	15,761	69.25
Lori Brooke	7,000	30.75
Total votes	22,767	100.00

=== General election ===
San Francisco's 2nd supervisorial district election
- November 3, 2026

Candidate	Stephen Sherrill	Monthanus Ratanapakdee	Nicholas Berg
First round	23,141; 83.92%	2,096; 7.60%	1,571; 5.70%
Maximum round	24,125; 90.21%	2,618; 9.79%	Eliminated
Supervisor before election
Stephen Sherrill
Elected Supervisor
Stephen Sherrill

Incumbent District 2 supervisor Stephen Sherrill was re-elected to serve a full four-year term on November 3, 2026.

==== Candidates ====
===== Declared =====
- Stephen Sherrill, incumbent supervisor
- Monthanus Ratanapakdee, executive director of the Justice for Vicha Ratanapakdee Foundation
- Nicholas Berg, chairman of the San Francisco Republican Party
- Guy McCoy, fast-food burger restaurant manager and a military veteran

===== Withdrew =====
- Lori Brooke, co-founder of Neighborhoods United SF

==== Endorsements ====
Stephen Sherrill

Newspapers

- Bay Area Reporter

== District 4 ==
=== Special election ===
San Francisco's 4th supervisorial district special election
- June 2, 2026

Candidate	Alan Wong	Natalie Gee	Albert Chow
First round	11,647; 46.08%	6,096; 24.12%	4,291; 16.98%
Maximum round	15,228; 64.37%	8,430; 35.63%	Eliminated
Candidate	Jeremy Julian Greco	David Lee
First round	1,976; 7.82%	1,265; 5.00%
Maximum round	Eliminated	Eliminated
Supervisor before election
Alan Wong
Elected Supervisor
Alan Wong

Incumbent supervisor Alan Wong was appointed in December 2025 by Mayor Daniel Lurie to succeed Joel Engardio after he was recalled in September 2025. Lurie first appointed Beya Alcaraz to fill Engardio's seat in November but she resigned after just one week in office following allegations she mismanaged her business. Wong won the special election in June 2026 to serve the remainder of Engardio's term and District 4 voters re-elected him to serve a full four-year term on November 3, 2026. District 4 includes the Central and Outer Sunset neighborhoods of the Sunset District.

The boundaries of District 4 as of April 28, 2022

==== Candidates ====
===== Declared =====
- Albert Chow, business owner and Engardio recall organizer
- Jeremy Greco, former worker-owner of Other Avenues Grocery Cooperative
- Natalie Gee, chief of staff to supervisor Shamann Walton
- David Lee, political activist and runner-up for California's 19th State Assembly district election in 2024
- Alan Wong, incumbent supervisor

==== Endorsements ====
Natalie Gee

State legislators

- Matt Haney, AD-17 (2022–present)

Local officials

- Art Agnos, former mayor of San Francisco (1988–1992)
- Connie Chan, San Francisco supervisor from the 1st district (2021–present)
- Myrna Melgar, San Francisco supervisor from the 7th district (2021–present)
- Jackie Fielder, San Francisco supervisor from the 9th district (2025–present)
- Shamann Walton, San Francisco supervisor from the 10th district (2019–present)
- Chyanne Chen, San Francisco supervisor from the 11th district (2025–present) (co-endorsement with Lee)
- Gordon Mar, former San Francisco supervisor from the 4th district (2019–2023)

Labor unions

- San Francisco Labor Council
- International Federation of Professional and Technical Engineers Local 21
- Service Employees International Union Local 1021
- American Federation of Teachers Local 2121

Organizations

- California Working Families Party
- Run for Something
- San Francisco Tenants Union

Newspapers

- San Francisco Bay Guardian
- Sing Tao Daily
David Lee

Local officials

- Chyanne Chen, San Francisco supervisor from the 11th district (2025–present) (co-endorsement with Gee)
- Aaron Peskin, former San Francisco supervisor from the 3rd district (2015–2025)
- Sandra Lee Fewer, former San Francisco supervisor from the 1st district (2017–2021)
- Sophie Maxwell, former San Francisco supervisor from the 10th district (2001–2011)
- Quentin Kopp, former San Francisco supervisor from the 8th district (1986–1998)
Alan Wong

Statewide officials

- Eleni Kounalakis, lieutenant governor of California (2019–present)
- Fiona Ma, state treasurer of California (2019–present)
- Malia Cohen, state controller of California (2023–present)

U.S. representatives

- Kevin Mullin, CA-15 (2023–present)

State legislators

- Catherine Stefani, AD-19 (2024–present)

Local officials

- Willie Brown, former mayor of San Francisco (1996–2004)
- Daniel Lurie, mayor of San Francisco (2025–present)

Labor unions

- San Francisco Police Officers Association
- International Association of Fire Fighters Local 798

Organizations

- GrowSF
- San Francisco Democratic Party

Newspapers

- San Francisco Chronicle
- Bay Area Reporter

=== General election ===
San Francisco's 4th supervisorial district election
- November 3, 2026

Candidate	Alan Wong	Albert Chow	Jeremy Julian Greco
First round	18,456; 64.63%	5,067; 17.74%	5,034; 17.63%
Maximum round	20,170; 75.35%	6,598; 24.65%	Eliminated
Supervisor before election
Alan Wong
Elected Supervisor
Alan Wong

==== Candidates ====
===== Declared =====
- Alan Wong, incumbent supervisor
- Albert Chow, hardware store owner
- Jeremy Julian Greco, school campus coordinator

==== Endorsements ====
Alan Wong

Newspapers

- Bay Area Reporter

== District 6 ==
San Francisco's 6th supervisorial district election
- November 3, 2026
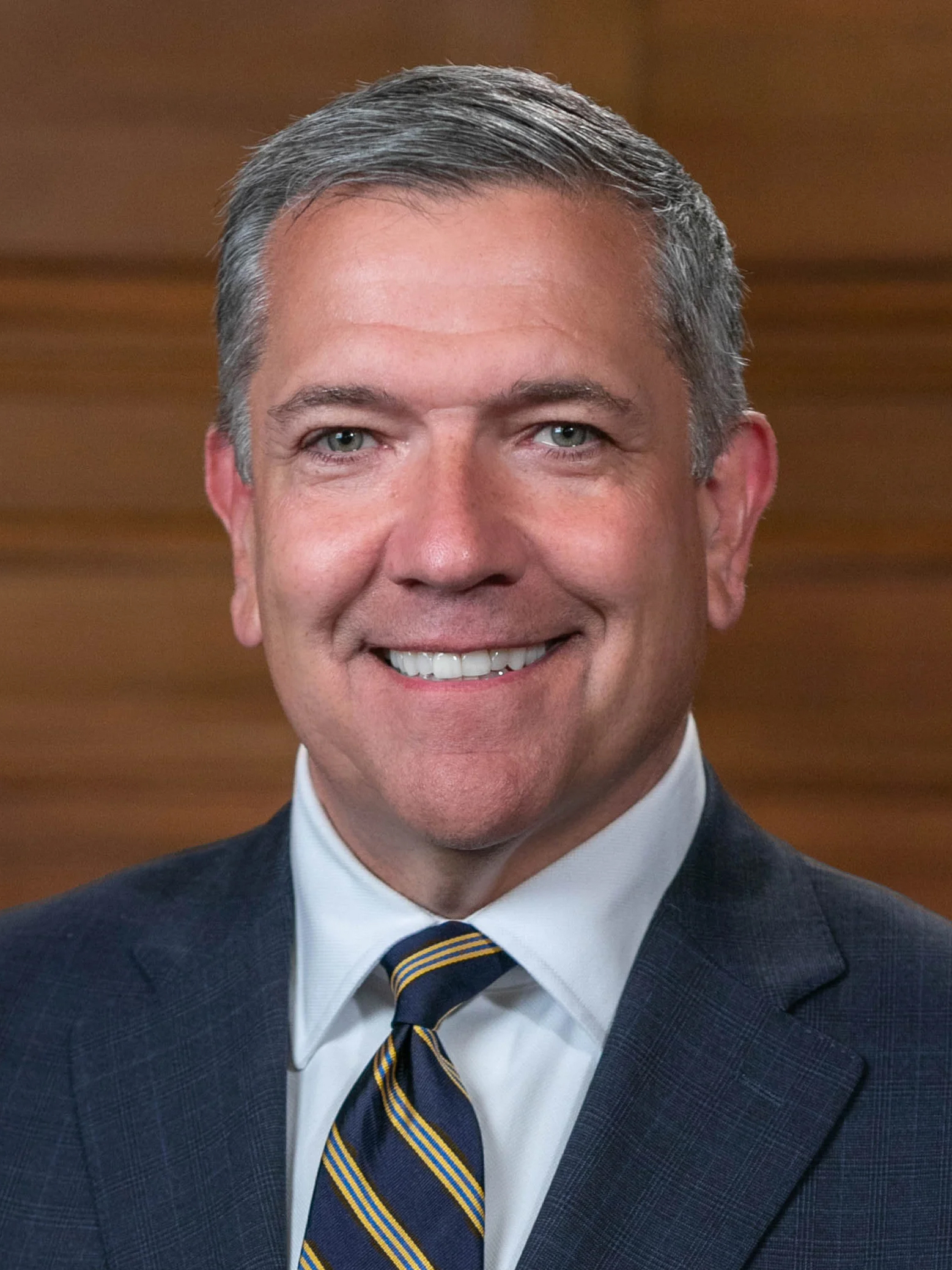

Candidate	Matt Dorsey	Alex Behrend
Popular vote	13,618	3,708
Percentage	78.60%	21.40%
Supervisor before election
Matt Dorsey
Elected Supervisor
Matt Dorsey

Incumbent supervisor Matt Dorsey was first elected in 2022 and was re-elected to a second term in November 2026. The district includes SoMa, Mid-Market, and Mission Bay.

=== Candidates ===
==== Declared ====
- Alex Behrend
- Matt Dorsey, incumbent supervisor

=== Endorsements ===
Matt Dorsey

Newspapers

- Bay Area Reporter

== District 8 ==
San Francisco's 8th supervisorial district election
- November 3, 2026

Candidate	Gary McCoy	Darshini Patel
First round	20,100; 49.63%	11,025; 27.22%
Maximum round	24,212; 63.25%	14,070; 36.75%
Candidate	Michael T. Nguyen	Manny Yekutiel
First round	4,791; 11.83%	4,581; 11.31%
Maximum round	Eliminated	Eliminated
Supervisor before election
Rafael Mandelman
Elected Supervisor
Gary McCoy

Several candidates ran to replace Rafael Mandelman, whose second term ends on January 8, 2027. District 8 includes The Castro, Glen Park, Noe Valley, and Diamond Heights.

District 8 voters elected Gary McCoy to succeed Mandelman on November 3, 2026. McCoy emerged as the frontrunner after Manny Yekutiel dropped out of the race on October 2.

In April 2026, Brad Joseph Chapin, a former board member of the Harvey Milk LGBTQ Democratic Club, filed a police report alleging that Yekutiel had sexually assaulted him in 2020. Yekutiel denied the allegations, claiming that they were politically motivated. The San Francisco Democratic Party endorsed Yekutiel despite the allegations, as did Mayor Daniel Lurie. Following public reporting of an additional set of allegations from The San Francisco Standard in June, several of Yekutiel's supporters revoked their endorsements. Yekutiel withdrew his candidacy.

=== Candidates ===
==== Declared ====
- Darshini Patel, former DoorDash executive and Democratic campaign organizer
- Gary McCoy, former aide to U.S. representative Nancy Pelosi
- Michael Nguyen, attorney and DCCC member

==== Withdrawn ====
- Manny Yekutiel, restaurant owner

=== Endorsements ===
Darshini Patel

Local officials

- Myrna Melgar, San Francisco supervisor from the 7th district (2021–present) (second choice)

Labor unions

- United Educators of San Francisco (co-endorsement with Gary McCoy and Michael Nguyen)

Organizations

- San Franciscans for Social Housing (first choice)
- SF Solidarity Club (first choice)
- Arab Resource and Organizing Center (AROC) Action (co-endorsement with Gary McCoy and Michael Nguyen)
- Assyrian Democrats of the Bay Area (second choice; listed as a recommendation)
- Indivisible SF (co-endorsement with Gary McCoy and Michael Nguyen)
Gary McCoy

U.S. representatives

- Nancy Pelosi, CA-11 (1987–present)

Local officials

- Matt Dorsey, San Francisco supervisor from the 6th district (2022–present) (previously endorsed Yekutiel)

Individuals

- Roma Guy, LGBT and women's rights activist
- Cleve Jones, AIDS and LGBT rights activist
- Anne Kronenberg, former political administrator and LGBT rights activist
- Danny Nicoletta, photographer, photojournalist, and gay rights activist

Labor unions

- American Federation of Teachers 2121 (co-endorsement with Nguyen)

Organizations

- Alice B. Toklas LGBTQ Democratic Club
- Harvey Milk LGBTQ Democratic Club (first choice)

Newspapers

- Bay Area Reporter (first choice)
Michael Nguyen

Labor unions

- American Federation of Teachers 2121 (co-endorsement with McCoy)

Organizations

- Harvey Milk LGBTQ Democratic Club (second choice)

Newspapers

- Bay Area Reporter (second choice)
Manny Yekutiel (withdrawn)

U.S. senators

- Cory Booker, New Jersey (2013–present)

U.S. representatives

- ~~Lateefah Simon, CA-12 (2025–present)~~ (endorsement rescinded)

Statewide officials

- ~~Rob Bonta, attorney general of California (2021–present)~~ (endorsement rescinded)

State legislators

- ~~Catherine Stefani, AD-19 (2024–present)~~ (endorsement rescinded)

Local officials

- Willie Brown, former mayor of San Francisco (1996–2004)
- ~~Matt Dorsey, San Francisco supervisor from the 6th district (2022–present)~~ (endorsement rescinded; later endorsed McCoy)
- ~~Daniel Lurie, mayor of San Francisco (2025–present)~~ (endorsement rescinded)
- ~~Bilal Mahmood, San Francisco supervisor from the 5th district (2025–present)~~ (endorsement rescinded)
- ~~Rafael Mandelman, incumbent supervisor (2018–present)~~ (endorsement rescinded)
- ~~Myrna Melgar, San Francisco supervisor from the 7th district (2021–present)~~ (endorsement rescinded)
- ~~Danny Sauter, San Francisco supervisor from the 3rd district (2025–present)~~ (endorsement rescinded)
- ~~Stephen Sherrill, San Francisco supervisor from the 2nd district (2024–present)~~ (endorsement rescinded)
- ~~Alan Wong, San Francisco supervisor from the 4th district (2025–present)~~ (endorsement rescinded)

Organizations

- Jane Fonda Climate PAC

Political parties

- ~~San Francisco Democratic Party~~ (endorsement rescinded)

== District 10 ==
San Francisco's 10th supervisorial district election
- November 3, 2026

Candidate	Theo Ellington	Dion-Jay Brookter
First round	9,792; 48.53%	3,899; 19.32%
Maximum round	11,976; 64.64%	6,552; 35.36%
Candidate	J.R. Eppler	Jessica Pessecow
First round	2,498; 12.38%	1,199; 5.94%
Maximum round	Eliminated	Eliminated
Supervisor before election
Shamann Walton
Elected Supervisor
Theo Ellington

A large slate of candidates ran to succeed Supervisor Shamann Walton, whose second term ends on January 8, 2027. District 10 voters elected Theodore (Theo) Ellington to represent them on November 3, 2026.

Ellington received many powerful endorsements and a political action committee backing his candidacy received a $500,000 contribution from billionaire Chris Larsen.

=== Candidates ===
==== Declared ====
- Pearci Bastiany
- Theo Ellington, nonprofit executive and candidate for this district in 2018
- J.R. Eppler, Board of Appeals commissioner
- Mike Lin
- Jameel Rasheed Patterson, community organizer
- Dion-Jay Brookter, CEO of Young Community Developers
- Jessica Pessecow
- Deandra Bryant
- Ellsworth M. Jennison Jr.
- Shawn M. Richard
- Jamo Muhammad
- Pearci Bastiany III

=== Endorsements ===
Theo Ellington

State legislators

- Scott Wiener, SD-11 (2016–present)

Local officials

- Matt Dorsey, supervisor from the 6th district (2022–present)
- Daniel Lurie, mayor of San Francisco (2025–present)
- Danny Sauter, supervisor from the 3rd district (2025–present)

Newspapers

- Bay Area Reporter
