= San Francisco Youth Commission =

American local government body

The San Francisco Youth Commission is a seventeen-member body which advises the Mayor and the Board of Supervisors on youth issues in San Francisco, California. Commissioners must be between the ages of 12 and 23.

== Creation ==
In 1995, community members lobbied the Board of Supervisors to create a youth commission. When this effort failed, local activists worked with then-Supervisor Angela Alioto to place the creation of a youth commission on the November 1995 ballot.

After failing to garner enough support from the Board of Supervisors, local activists with the help of then-Supervisor Angela Alioto placed the creation of a Youth Commission on the November 1995 ballot. The measure passed with over 60 percent of the popular vote, and the San Francisco Youth Commission was created. The first Youth Commissioners were sworn into office in April 1996.

== Appointments ==
The San Francisco Youth Commission has seventeen members. Each of the eleven members of the San Francisco Board of Supervisors appoints one Commissioner. The remaining six Commissioners are appointed by the Mayor. Five of the Mayor's appointments are "diversity appointments," made after the Supervisors' picks to ensure that the commission is representative of the city's diverse youth population. Commissioners must live in San Francisco.

Interested youth must submit a written application and complete individual and/or group interviews in the spring preceding their term of service. Returning Commissioners must reapply in order to serve multiple terms. After interviews are completed, Youth Commission staff make non-binding recommendations of prospective Commissioners to the Supervisors and Mayor. Supervisors may appoint Commissioners from outside of their district.

== Accomplishments ==
As of 2015, the San Francisco Youth Commission has been in existence for nineteen years. During this time, it has advised the Mayor and Board of Supervisors on a variety of issues via public resolutions and statements.

Healthy Kids
In 2004, the Youth Commission successfully expanded "Healthy Kids," San Francisco's universal health care system for children, to include 18- to 24-year-olds. This preceded the city's expansion of universal health care to all residents, signed by Mayor Gavin Newsom in 2007.

Transitional Youth Task Force/Interagency Council (From the Youth Commission's website.)
In 2005, the Youth Commission authored a resolution advising the Mayor to evaluate the special needs of transitional young adults. In response, the Mayor formed the two-year Transitional Youth Task Force. Two-thirds of the Task Force's members are adults; the remaining one-third are young adult advocates who have been involved with foster care, juvenile justice, mental health, special needs, alternative education, or other city systems relevant to transitional youth. Mayor Newsom allocated $500,000 in the FY2007 budget to form an official Interagency Council, which works with City departments who serve young adults to address gaps in available supportive services.

The Task Force drafted 16 policy recommendations based on information gathered from focus groups involving over 100 youth across a range of systems. In 2007, the Task Force transformed into the Transition Age Youth San Francisco initiative (TAYSF) in order to implement these recommendations. TAYSF recently joined forces with the Workforce Investment Board of San Francisco Youth Council to address issues of workforce development for transition-age youth that the Task Force had identified through their community-based research.

Skateboarding Task Force

Due to increased tension between the San Francisco Police Department and local skateboarders, the Youth Commission created a Skateboard Task Force to work towards providing legal venues for youth to skate. In 2003, Matt Gonzalez included creating skate parks in his official platform.

Youth Recognition Day
In 2001, former SFYC Chair Anthony E. Valdez authored the Positive Recognition of Youth Resolution [File #10-008], pursuant to which the Youth Commission hosts an annual Youth Recognition Day. On this day, the Board of Supervisors formally recognizes the contributions of young citizens to their districts or the broader San Francisco community.

== Current Youth Commissioners ==
Youth Commissioners for the 2022–2023 term:

Emily Nguyen (chair) - Appointed by District 11 Supervisor Ahsha Safaí
Ewan Barker Plummer (Vice-chair) - Appointed by Mayor London Breed
Steven Hum (Legislative Affairs Officer) - Appointed by Mayor London Breed
Raven Shaw (Legislative Affairs Officer) - Appointed by Mayor London Breed
Gabrielle Listana (Communications and Outreach Officer) - Appointed by District 6 Supervisor Matt Dorsey
Astrid Utting (Communications and Outreach Officer) - Appointed by District 8 Supervisor Rafael Mandelman
Chloe Wong - Appointed by District 1 Supervisor Connie Chan (politician)
Allister Adair - Appointed by District 2 Supervisor Catherine Stefani
Vacant - Appointed by District 3 Supervisor Aaron Peskin
Maureen Loftus - Appointed by District 4 Supervisor Gordon Mar
Hayden Miller - Appointed by District 5 Supervisor Dean Preston
Ann Anish - Appointed by District 7 Supervisor Myrna Melgar
Yoselin Colin - Appointed by District 9 Supervisor Hillary Ronen
Vanessa Pimentel - Appointed by District 10 Supervisor Shamann Walton
Vacant - Appointed by Mayor London Breed
Tyrone Hillman - Appointed by Mayor London Breed

== Past Youth Commissioners ==
Youth Commissioners for the 2022–2023 term:

Emily Nguyen (chair) - Appointed by District 11 Supervisor Ahsha Safaí
Ewan Barker Plummer (Vice-chair) - Appointed by Mayor London Breed
Steven Hum (Legislative Affairs Officer) - Appointed by Mayor London Breed
Raven Shaw (Legislative Affairs Officer) - Appointed by Mayor London Breed
Gabrielle Listana (Communications and Outreach Officer) - Appointed by District 6 Supervisor Matt Dorsey
Astrid Utting (Communications and Outreach Officer) - Appointed by District 8 Supervisor Rafael Mandelman
Chloe Wong - Appointed by District 1 Supervisor Connie Chan (politician)
Allister Adair - Appointed by District 2 Supervisor Catherine Stefani
Vacant - Appointed by District 3 Supervisor Aaron Peskin
Maureen Loftus - Appointed by District 4 Supervisor Gordon Mar
Hayden Miller - Appointed by District 5 Supervisor Dean Preston
Ann Anish - Appointed by District 7 Supervisor Myrna Melgar
Yoselin Colin - Appointed by District 9 Supervisor Hillary Ronen
Vanessa Pimentel - Appointed by District 10 Supervisor Shamann Walton
Vacant - Appointed by Mayor London Breed
Tyrone Hillman - Appointed by Mayor London Breed
