= Gary McCoy (politician) =

American politician (born 1978)

- McCoy in 2026

Member-elect of the San Francisco Board of Supervisors from the 8th district
- Assuming office January 8, 2027
- Succeeding: Rafael Mandelman

Personal details
- Born: Raymond Gary McCoy; June 27, 1978 (age 48) Norfolk, Virginia, U.S.
- Party: Democratic
- Spouse: Kory A. Powell (m. 2015)
- Education: City College of San Francisco; Bay Area Medical Academy

Raymond Gary McCoy (born June 27, 1978) is an American politician and former political aide who is a member-elect of the San Francisco Board of Supervisors for the 8th district. After overcoming drug addiction, McCoy became sober in 2011 and worked as a political aide to San Francisco supervisors Scott Wiener, London Breed, and Julie Christensen, as well as a congressional aide to House Speaker Nancy Pelosi. He also held leadership roles at organizations including HealthRIGHT 360, the Alice B. Toklas LGBTQ Democratic Club, and the Harvey Milk LGBTQ Democratic Club. McCoy ran for the San Francisco Board of Supervisors in the 2026 election to succeed Rafael Mandelman. Considered a frontrunner alongside Manny Yekutiel, McCoy won the election on November 3 after Yekutiel withdrew following sexual assault allegations by three men.

== Early life ==
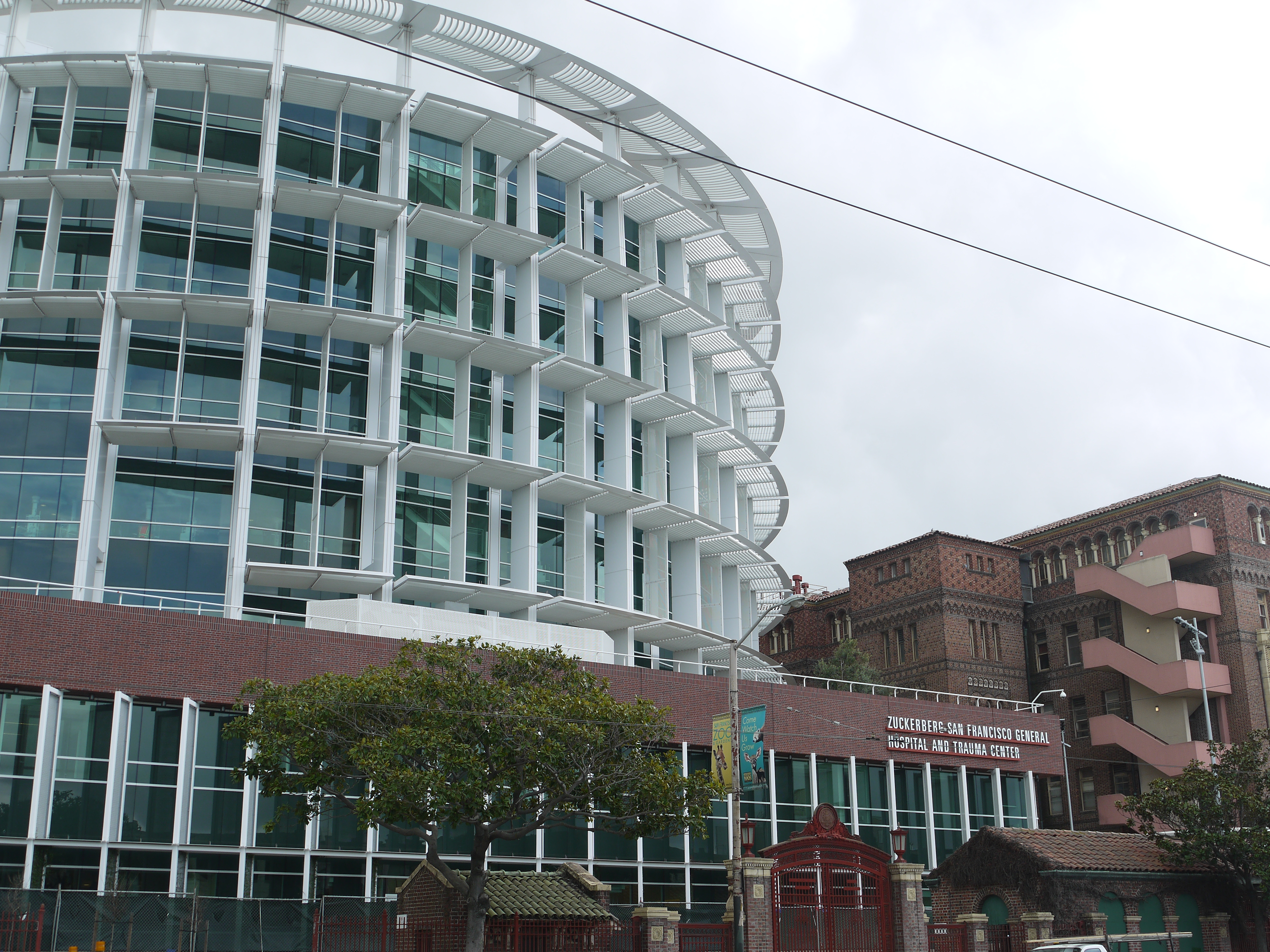
McCoy spent much of his time homeless on the streets or admitted to the San Francisco General Hospital (pictured)

Raymond Gary McCoy was born on June 27, 1978, and raised in Norfolk, Virginia, in a family he described as conservative. His mother was a nurse who managed a family medical practice, and his father worked in nuclear refueling at Norfolk Naval Shipyard. McCoy said he was closeted as a child and experienced "significant childhood trauma," some of which was related to his sexuality. He began using heroin at age 14 and developed an addiction by 17; his parents divorced during his adolescence but remarried the following year. After dropping out of high school, McCoy shoplifted to fund his drug use and was arrested at a Walmart after a friend attempted to steal a computer. He was charged with grand larceny received three years' probation but repeatedly missed required check-ins and drug screenings.

McCoy said he left Norfolk as soon as he could and moved to San Francisco in his early 20s to work in the marketing department at Clear Channel Radio, but within two weeks, he had resumed using heroin and was arrested again. He was placed in a court-ordered diversion program for a drug-possession charge, but later developed a methamphetamine addiction and contracted HIV. After losing his apartment, he became homeless and was diagnosed with AIDS in 2005, sleeping on the streets or at San Francisco General Hospital, where he was frequently admitted. A court complaint described him as having "a panoply of mental health disorders."

After a friend urged him to seek help, and when his T cell count fell to four, McCoy told a caseworker at San Francisco General Hospital that he was ready to enter treatment and resume his HIV medication. In 2008, he was diagnosed with Kaposi's sarcoma, and a judge later allowed him to choose a treatment program. He entered a harm-reduction program which he left after a month to use drugs before returning at the urging of an overnight counselor. McCoy completed the program on February 23, 2011, and has said he has been sober since. He later earned a GED, obtained a phlebotomy license from Bay Area Medical Academy, attended City College of San Francisco, and completed an externship at San Francisco General Hospital.

== Political career ==
=== Volunteering and legislative aide work ===
A mutual acquaintance introduced McCoy to then-Supervisor Scott Wiener, whose office offered him a volunteer position. McCoy later worked as a legislative aide to Wiener, London Breed, and Julie Christensen, and in policy and public affairs for the San Francisco Recreation & Parks Department. He said he disclosed his criminal and drug use history during each background check and was welcomed by each employer.

He ran to succeed David Fujimoto as male co-chair of the Alice B. Toklas LGBTQ Democratic Club in December 2020. In August 2021, McCoy went on a 60-hour hunger strike outside San Francisco City Hall, urging city leaders to declare an emergency over the growing drug crisis. In May 2022, McCoy sued writer Erica Sandberg over a tweet sharing a wanted poster that falsely accused him of being responsible for the "murder of 1,500 plus drug addicts" at the Tenderloin Center. The poster was originally posted by an account named Karl Brandt, after Adolf Hitler's physician. McCoy was elected vice president for communications of the Harvey Milk LGBTQ Democratic Club in January 2023. He became interim president in September 2024 after incumbent Jeffrey Kwong stepped down amid a scandal involving the club's endorsements in several races.

=== San Francisco Board of Supervisors ===
McCoy (sitting, second to right) during a candidate forum in 2026

On September 30, 2025, McCoy announced his candidacy for the 8th district seat in the 2026 San Francisco Board of Supervisors election, seeking to succeed outgoing supervisor Rafael Mandelman. He was endorsed by labor groups, Nancy Pelosi, progressive supervisors Connie Chan and Aaron Peskin, moderate supervisor Matt Dorsey, and YIMBY groups. His main opponent was Manny Yekutiel, the owner of the popular café Manny's in Mission District. Yekutiel was considered a frontrunner alongside McCoy, who formed a ranked-choice voting alliance with candidate Darshini Patel. He faced opposition from the political group GrowSF, which criticized his criminal record, past drug use, approach to the drug crisis, and affiliation with HealthRIGHT 360.

The race shifted after allegations of sexual assault against Yekutiel emerged. In July 2026, political activist Brad Chapin accused him of sexually assaulting him at a party in 2020, but the San Francisco Democratic Party still voted to endorse Yekutiel. In October, two other men made similar allegations against him. After the second allegation, several endorsements were withdrawn, and Yekutiel dropped out of the race. After Yekutiel withdrew, several of his former endorsers, including Rafael Mandelman and the San Francisco Democratic Party, endorsed McCoy, broadening his support. In the general election, McCoy defeated Darshini Patel in the ranked-choice vote, winning a majority.
