= Theo Ellington =

American politician (born 1988)

- Ellington in 2026

Member-elect of the San Francisco Board of Supervisors from the 10th district
- Assuming office January 8, 2027
- Succeeding: Shamann Walton

Personal details
- Born: Theodore Ellington; September 20, 1988 (age 38) San Francisco, California, U.S.
- Party: Democratic
- Education: Notre Dame de Namur University (BA); University of San Francisco (MA)

Theodore G. Ellington (born September 20, 1988) is an American politician who is a member-elect of the San Francisco Board of Supervisors for the 10th district. Prior to becoming a Supervisor, he served as a director of services and as a lobbyist for various organizations. In 2018, he ran for the San Francisco Board of Supervisors to replace Malia Cohen but lost to Shamann Walton. After Walton was term-limited, Ellington ran again in 2026, with support from moderates, and won by a large margin.

== Early life and education ==
Theodore G. Ellington was born on September 20, 1988 and raised in the Bayview district of San Francisco, California. His grandfather moved from Natchez, Mississippi, buying a house in the 1990s, with Ellington living in it with ten other relatives. Ellington became interested in public service at age 13, after his cousin was killed in a shooting. He was the first in his family to graduate from college, earning a bachelor's degree in political science from Notre Dame de Namur University and a master's degree in urban affairs from the University of San Francisco.

== Career ==
Ellington in 2018, when he first ran for San Francisco Board of Supervisors.

Before being elected to office in 2026, Ellington worked in various roles as a director of services and as a lobbyist. He worked as a director of homeless initiatives for The Salvation Army in San Francisco. On July 3, 2014, he was announced as the director of public affairs for the Golden State Warriors. He served on the board of directors of Neighbors for a Better San Francisco from 2022 to 2025. He was also executive director of the Bayview Opera House, where he led major equipment upgrades, job training, and grants funded by the city's Office of Economic and Workforce Development and Human Rights Commission.

=== San Francisco Board of Supervisors ===
In 2018, Ellington ran for the San Francisco Board of Supervisors in the 10th district, seeking to replace term-limited incumbent Malia Cohen, whom he served as field coordinator during her 2010 campaign. He was considered one of the three frontrunners in the race, which included candidates Tony Kelly and Shamann Walton. Ellington said that, if elected, he would focus on developing a neighborhood plan to connect the area's development projects through transportation, public spaces, and amenities. He also called for further testing of the Shipyard area, where cleanup and soil testing had been conducted; he had been involved in a lawsuit against Tetra Tech and the developer. Walton would ultimately win the election, with Ellington placing third behind Tony Kelly.

After Walton became term limited, Ellington ran in the district's 2026 election and was considered a frontrunner. During the campaign, an independent committee that supported Ellington was given $500,000 by business executive Chris Larsen, drawing criticism from his opponents. Ellington won the election with about 67% of the vote; his closest opponent, DJ Brookter, received 31%.
