= Marina District, San Francisco =

The Marina
- Neighborhood of San Francisco
- Marina District
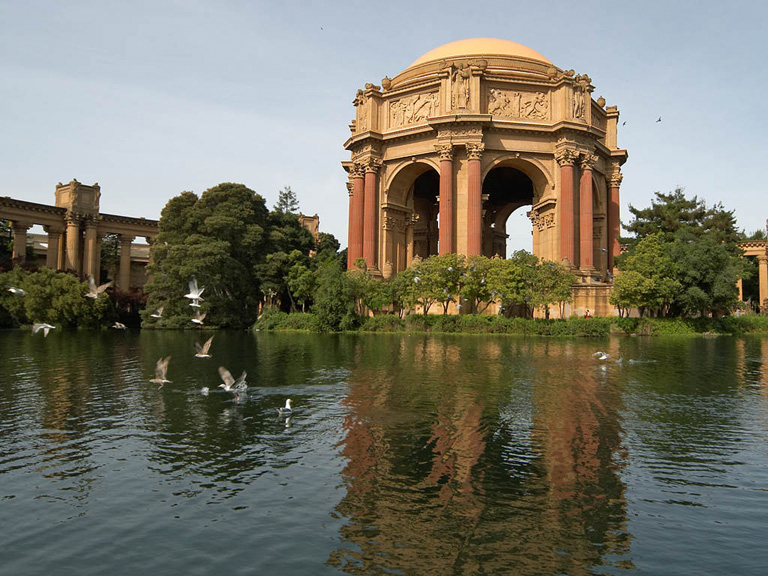
- The Palace of Fine Arts, a replica of the one built for the Panama–Pacific International Exposition, is a landmark of the Marina District.
- Nickname: The Marina
- Location within Central San Francisco
- Coordinates: 37.803°N 122.436°W
- Country: United States
- State: California
- City-county: San Francisco

Government
  - Board of Supervisors: Stephen Sherrill
  - State Assembly: Catherine Stefani (D)
  - State Senate: Scott Wiener (D)
  - U.S. House: Nancy Pelosi (D)

Area
  - Total: 0.778 sq mi (2.02 km^{2})
  - Land: 0.778 sq mi (2.02 km^{2})

Population (2008)
  - Total: 12,071
  - Density: 15,511/sq mi (5,989/km^{2})
- ZIP Code: 94123
- Area codes: 415/628

The Marina District is a neighborhood located in San Francisco, California. The neighborhood sits on the site of the 1915 Panama–Pacific International Exposition, staged after the 1906 San Francisco earthquake to celebrate the reemergence of the city. Aside from the Palace of Fine Arts, all other buildings were demolished to make the current neighborhood.

== Location ==
The area is bounded to the east by Van Ness Avenue and Fort Mason; on the west by Lyon Street and the Presidio National Park; on the south by Cow Hollow and Lombard St, which bisects the southern edge of the Marina District. The northern half of the Marina is a shoreline of the San Francisco Bay, and features the Marina Green, a park adjacent to the municipal boat marina from which the neighborhood takes its name.

Much of the Marina is built on former landfill, and is susceptible to soil liquefaction during strong earthquakes. This phenomenon caused extensive damage to the entire neighborhood during the 1989 Loma Prieta earthquake.

== History ==
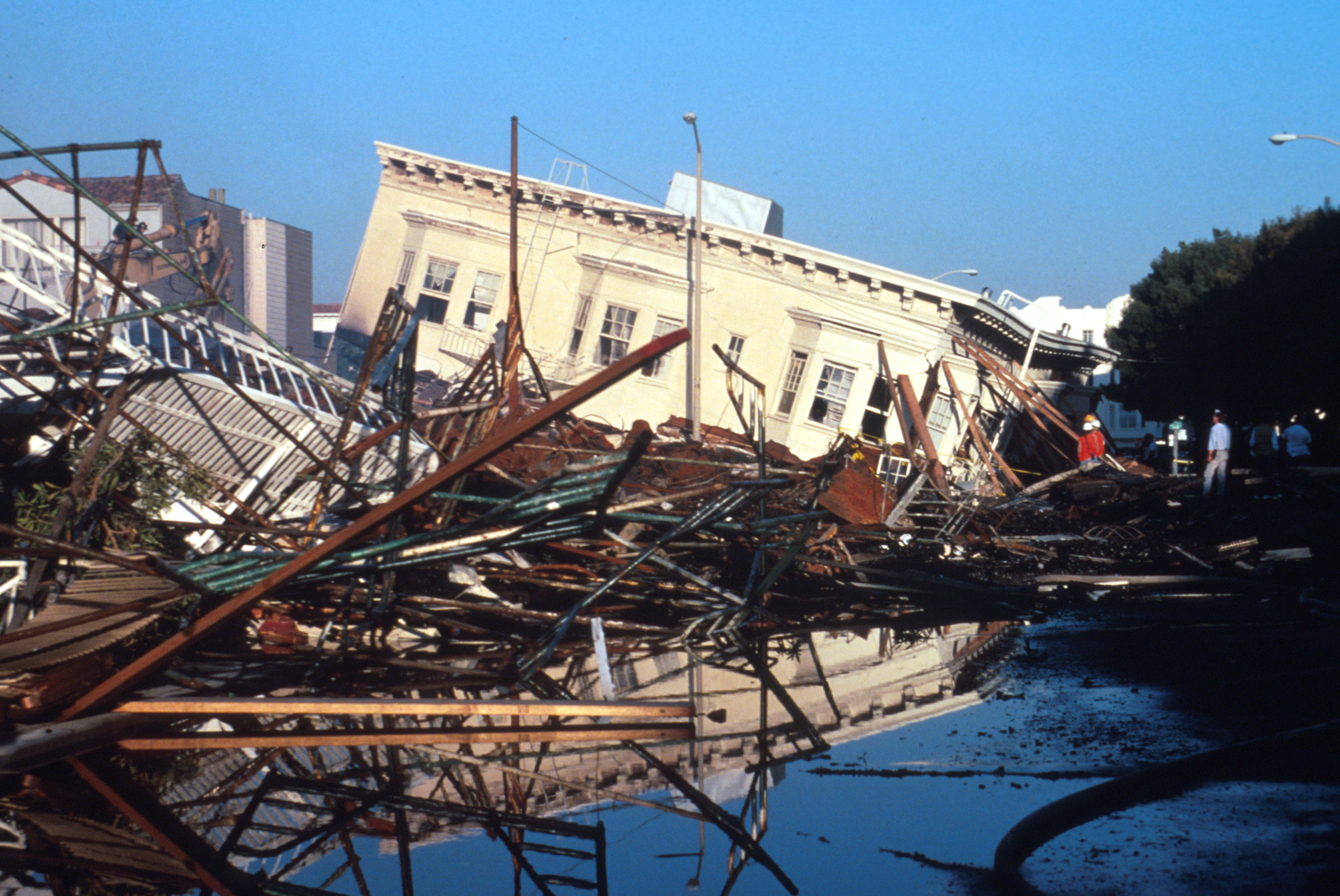
Damage to the Marina District following the 1989 Loma Prieta earthquake.

The area in the 19th century prior to the 1906 earthquake consisted of bay shallows, tidal pools, sand dunes, and marshland similar to nearby Crissy Field. Human habitation and development came in the mid to late 19th century in the form of a sandwall and of a road from the nearby Presidio to Fort Mason. Most of the sand dunes were leveled out and a hodgepodge of wharves and industrial plants was built extending from what is now Laguna Street to Steiner Street. However, all of this was destroyed in the 1906 earthquake.

During reconstruction of the city after the 1906 earthquake, the area was chosen as the site of the Panama–Pacific International Exposition. Although rubble from the earthquake was used as part of the land reclamation, most of the landfill came from dredging mud and sand from the bottom of the Bay. After the end of the exposition in 1915, the land was sold to private developers, who tore down nearly all of the fair's attractions and developed the area into a residential neighborhood. This major redevelopment was completed in the 1920s. In the 1930s, with the completion of the nearby Golden Gate Bridge, Lombard Street (now Highway 101) was widened, and soon developed into a strip of roadside motels. These roadside motels are relics of the past when people would need a place to stay after visiting the Golden Gate Bridge.

The 1989 Loma Prieta earthquake caused severe liquefaction of the fill upon which the neighborhood is built, causing major damage including a small firestorm. Firefighters resorted to pumping water directly from the Bay, to replace water unavailable from broken water mains. The neighborhood was quickly rebuilt soon thereafter. Physically, the neighborhood appears to have changed very little since its construction in the 1920s.

== Attractions ==
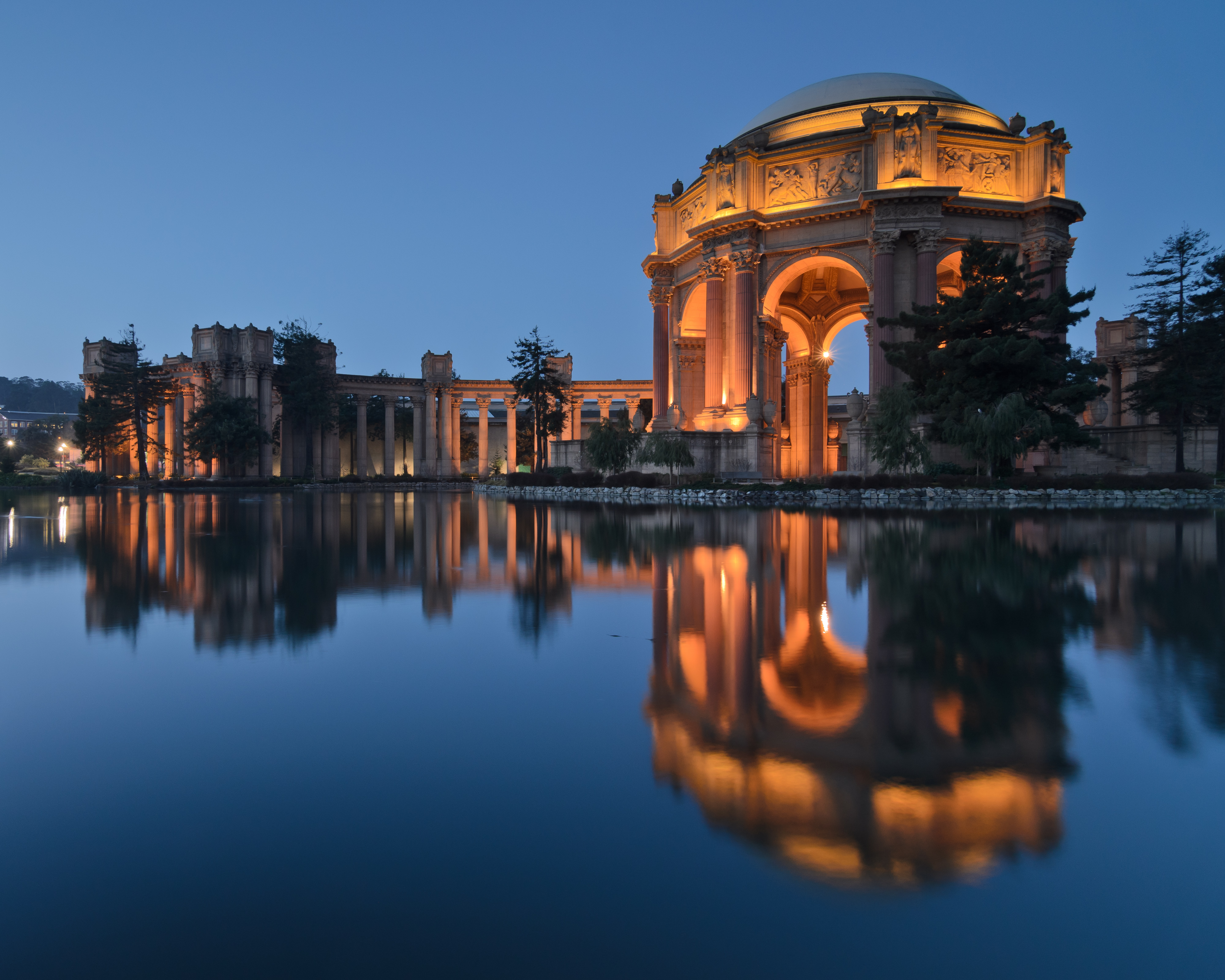
The Palace of Fine Arts at Night

The neighborhood is most famous for the Palace of Fine Arts, which until 2013 housed the Exploratorium, a hands-on science museum and children's educational center, and which takes up much of the western section of the neighborhood. The Palace is the only building left standing in its original location within the 1915 Exposition fairgrounds. The grounds around the Palace are a year-round attraction for tourists and locals, and are used as a location for weddings and wedding party photographs for couples. Chestnut Street is another attraction for locals and tourists. Stretching from Fillmore Street down to Lyon Street, Chestnut is lined with a collection of stores, restaurants, bakeries, coffee shops and bars.

The neighborhood is also noted for its demographics, which since the 1980s have shifted from mostly middle-class families and pensioners, to professionals in their twenties and thirties. These now make up more than half of the population, although a small, affluent older population remains.

San Francisco's Academy of Art University has a campus housing building at the Southern edge of the neighborhood on Lombard Street.

== Government and infrastructure ==
The Marina District is represented by the District 2 San Francisco Board of Supervisors.

The San Francisco Police Department Northern Station serves the Marina District.

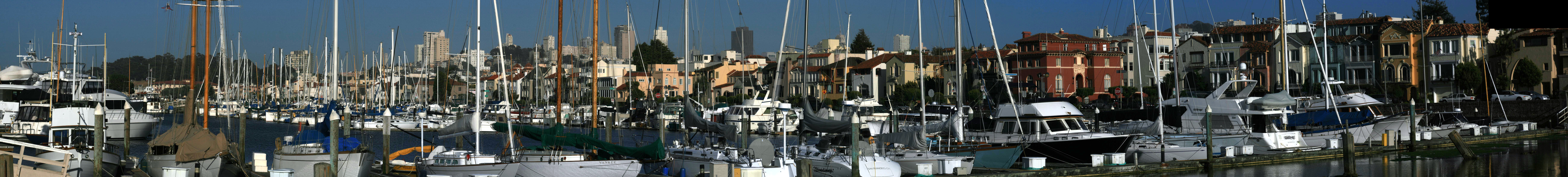
The Marina District from the Marina Green and the municipal Marina.

== Politics ==
The Marina District is a moderate neighborhood that has been increasingly in favor of "Yes In My Back Yard" YIMBY policies.

== Education ==
The Marina district is located within the San Francisco Unified School District (SFUSD) and is within the Sherman Elementary School attendance area. As of 2018 Sherman has about 20 teachers. Along with that, the Marina also has the Tule Elk Park Child Development Center that helps students within the community.

The Marina District has multiple different middle schools including Marina Middle School Claire Lilienthal School, both of which is part of the SFUSD. Claire Lilienthal School is a California Distinguished K-8 alternative school.
