= Alan Wong (politician) =

American politician

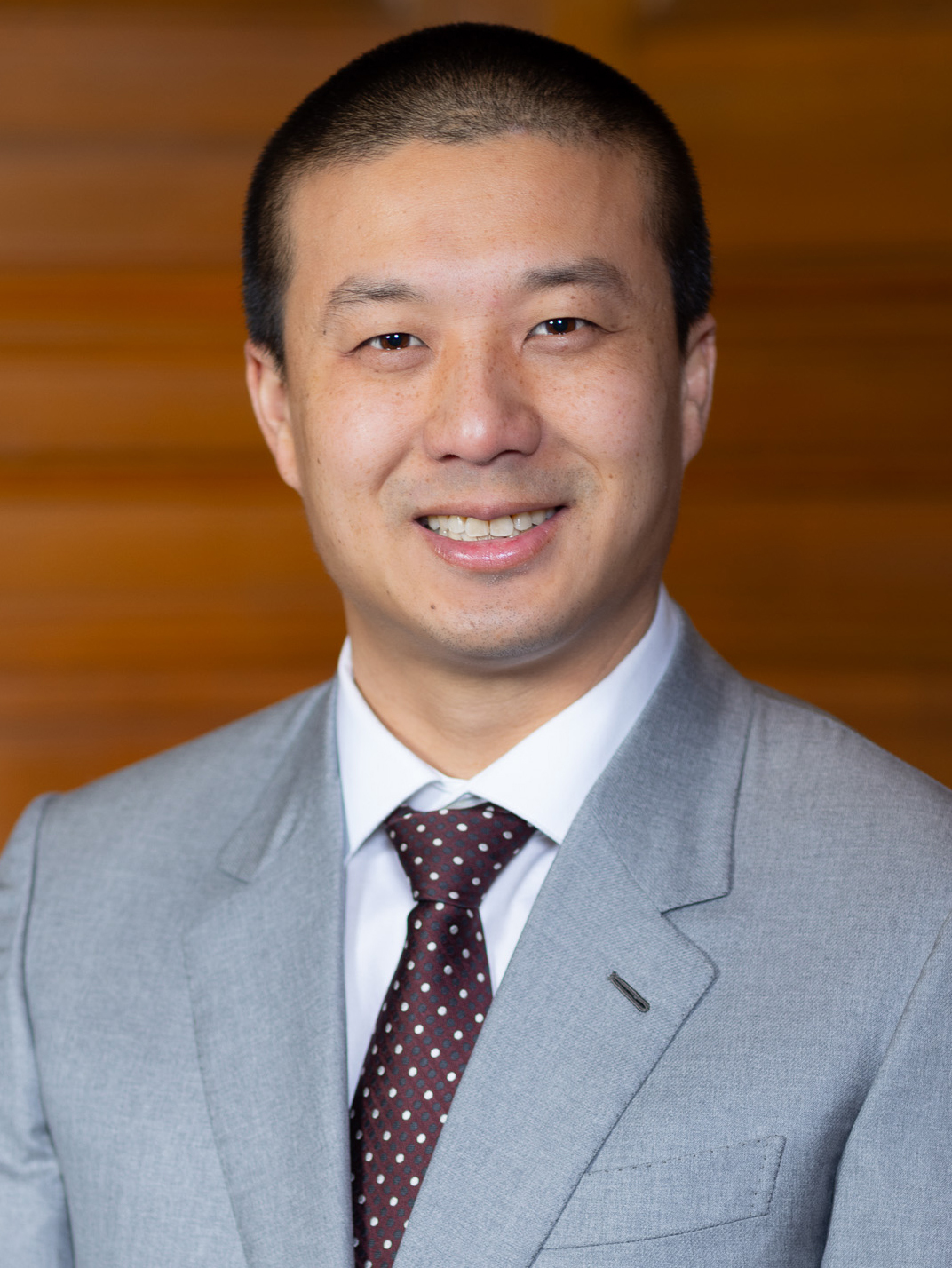
- Official portrait, 2026

Member of the San Francisco Board of Supervisors from the 4th district
- Incumbent
- Assumed office December 1, 2025
- Appointed by: Daniel Lurie
- Preceded by: Beya Alcaraz

Personal details
- Born: 1986 or 1987 (age 38–39) San Francisco, California, U.S.
- Party: Democratic
- Education: City College of San Francisco (attended); University of California, San Diego (BA); University of San Francisco (MPA)
- Website: Official website

Military service
- Allegiance: United States
- Branch/service: California National Guard
- Years of service: 2009–present
- Rank: Captain

Chinese name
- Traditional Chinese: 王兆倫
- Simplified Chinese: 王兆伦
Transcriptions
Standard Mandarin
- Hanyu Pinyin: Wáng Zhàolún
Yue: Cantonese
- Jyutping: Wong4 Siu6 leon4

Alan Wong (Chinese: 王兆倫) (born 1986/1987) is an American politician currently serving as a member of the San Francisco Board of Supervisors since December 1, 2025. He was selected by Mayor Daniel Lurie to replace Beya Alcaraz, who had resigned earlier that month. Prior to becoming supervisor, he served on the City College of San Francisco Board of Trustees between 2021 and 2026.

== Early life ==
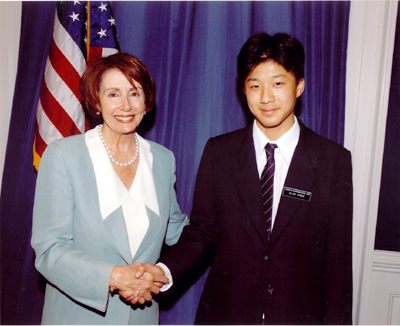
Wong in 2004 with Representative Nancy Pelosi

Wong was born and raised in the Sunset District of San Francisco to immigrants from Hong Kong. Wong's father is a hotel cook and union activist, and his mother is a housewife. Wong graduated from Abraham Lincoln High School in 2005. In high school, he was a student delegate on the San Francisco Board of Education. He was one of the plaintiffs who sued the board for raising Superintendent Arlene Ackerman's salary.

Wong attended City College of San Francisco before transferring to the University of California, San Diego, where he graduated at age 19. He later earned his master's in public affairs from the University of San Francisco.

After graduation, Wong served as a union organizer with SEIU UHW and a legislative aide for San Francisco Supervisor Gordon Mar. He also worked as policy director for the Children's Council of San Francisco.

== Political career ==
=== City College of San Francisco Board of Trustees ===
Wong was first elected to the City College of San Francisco (CCSF) Board of Trustees in the November 3, 2020 election. During his time on the board, he served as its president and advocated for the preservation of Cantonese instruction at the college.

=== San Francisco Board of Supervisors ===
On November 30, 2025, San Francisco Mayor Daniel Lurie selected Wong to assume the office of District 4 Supervisor after Beya Alcaraz's resignation earlier that month. Wong was sworn in by Lurie the following day. Lurie subsequently appointed Ruth Ferguson to fill Wong's vacancy on the CCSF Board of Trustees.

In January 2026, Wong attempted to place a ballot measure on the June 2026 election to reopen the Great Highway to vehicles during weekdays. The measure failed to garner the necessary signatures to do so.

On June 2, 2026, Wong was elected in the special election with 64.37% of the vote against four other candidates to complete the partial term, which ends in January 2027. Wong is running for reelection in the November 2026 general election for the full four-year term beginning in January 2027.

== Personal life ==
Alan Wong has served in the California National Guard since 2009. As of March 2026, he ranks as a captain.

== Electoral history ==
=== City College of San Francisco Board of Trustees ===
City College of San Francisco Board of Trustees election, 2020
Candidate	Votes	%
Shanell Williams (incumbent)	195,356	17.98
Tom Temprano (incumbent)	186,583	17.17
Aliya Chisti	126,904	11.68
Alan Wong	123,437	11.36
Anita Martinez	117,629	10.83
Marie Hurabiell	86,726	7.98
Han Zou	74,975	6.90
Victor Olivieri	72,840	6.70
Jeanette Quick	57,925	5.33
Gerayme Teeter	25,580	2.35
Dominic Ashe	18,556	1.71
Total votes	1,086,511	100.00

City College of San Francisco Board of Trustees election, 2024
Candidate	Votes	%
Heather McCarty	162,477	19.73
Aliya Chisti (incumbent)	149,638	18.18
Alan Wong (incumbent)	140,951	17.12
Luis Zamora	117,682	14.29
Ruth Ferguson	114,132	13.86
Leanna C. Louie	50,353	6.12
Ben Kaplan	49,320	5.99
Julio J. Ramos	38,741	4.71
Total votes	823,294	100.00

=== San Francisco Board of Supervisors ===
District 4 supervisorial special election, June 2026 Vacancy arising from the resignation of Beya Alcaraz
Candidate	Votes	%
Alan Wong	11,646	46.08
Natalie Gee	6,093	24.11
Albert Chow	4,291	16.98
Jeremy Julian Greco	1,976	7.82
David Lee	1,625	5.01
Total votes	25,271	100.00
Ranked choice voting — Pass 4
Alan Wong	15,227	64.37
Natalie Gee	8,427	35.63
Exhausted votes	1,617	6.40%
Total votes	25,271	100.00

District 4 supervisorial election, November 2026
Candidate	Votes	%
Albert Chow		
Jeremy Julian Greco		
Alan Wong (incumbent)		
Total votes		100.00
