= San Francisco Proposition G (March 2024) =

Ballot proposition in San Francisco

2026 San Francisco Proposition D
- March 5, 2024
- Offering Algebra 1 to Eighth Graders.

Results
Choice	Votes	%
Yes	182,066	81.75%
No	40,638	18.25%
Total votes	222,704	100.00%
Results by neighborhood
Yes
90–100%
80–90%
70–80%
60–70%
50–60%
No
90–100%
80–90%
70–80%
60–70%
50–60%

On November 20, 2023, the San Francisco Board of Supervisors passed a motion ordering the inclusion of Proposition G: Offering Algebra 1 to Eighth Graders on the March 2024 Local Ballot. Written by Supervisor Joel Engardio, the measure acts as a non-binding policy statement urging the San Francisco Unified School District to reverse their decision on delaying enrollment in Algebra I until ninth grade. The measure passed with 81.75% of the vote. The passage of the measure did not immediately change course offerings for students. The San Francisco Unified School District is a public agency that is separate from the City and retains jurisdiction in regards to when Algebra I is able to be offered to students. Passage of the proposal would inform the San Francisco Unified School District on the stance of the constituents in regards to their preferred math offerings for students. Additionally, the proposal would: support the School District's development of its math curriculum for students at all grade levels, explore differentiation options for students both below and above grade-level in math across all grades, and promote pathways for students interested in studying STEM at the university level.

== Results ==
The election was held on March 5, 2024. Proposition G passed with 81.75% of the vote, receiving 182,066 "Yes" votes and 40,638 "No" votes.
