= Forest Knolls =

Forest Knolls may refer to:

- Forest Knolls (New Rochelle), a neighborhood in New Rochelle, New York, US
- Forest Knolls, British Columbia, a neighbourhood in Langley Township, British Columbia, Canada
- Forest Knolls, Marin County, California, an unincorporated community in the US
- Forest Knolls, San Francisco, California, a neighborhood at the foot of Mount Sutro in the US
- "Forest Knolls", a track on John Vanderslice's 2009 album Romanian Names

== See also ==
- Lagunitas-Forest Knolls, California, a census-designated place in the US
