= 2018 San Francisco Board of Supervisors election =

- November 6, 2018

In 2018, five of the eleven seats of the San Francisco Board of Supervisors were on the ballot in the 2018 San Francisco Board of Supervisors elections. A special election was held on June 5 for one of the five seats, while the other four were decided on the November 6 general election ballot. The elections followed the ranked-choice voting format.

== Results ==
=== District 2 ===

Incumbent Supervisor Mark Farrell was ineligible to run for reelection due to term limits. On January 23, 2018, he was appointed interim mayor, succeeding London Breed, who had been acting mayor since the death of Ed Lee. Farrell appointed Catherine Stefani as his successor, and she announced she would run for a full term in the election.

Kat Anderson, a labor attorney; Schuyler Hudak, a startup founder; and Nick Josefowitz, the San Francisco BART Board Director, were candidates. Former Supervisor Michela Alioto-Pier was considered a potential candidate, but a ballot proposition on the June 2018 ballot limiting supervisors to two terms in their lifetime, rather than the present two consecutive term limit, prevented Alioto-Pier from running for a third term.

District 2 supervisorial election, 2018
Candidate	Votes	%
Catherine Stefani (incumbent)	14,378	40.71
Nick Josefowitz	13,617	38.56
Schuyler Hudak	4,132	11.70
John Dennis	3,095	8.76
Write-in	93	0.26
Total votes	35,315	100.00

=== District 4 ===

Incumbent Supervisor Katy Tang was eligible to run for reelection, but announced her intention not to seek re-election. Candidates to succeed her included Gordon Mar, Li Miao Lovett, Jessica Ho, Lou Ann Bassan, Arthur Tom, and Trevor McNeil. Tang supported Ho, who worked for Tang as a legislative aide.

District 4 supervisorial election, 2018
Candidate	Votes	%
Gordon Mar	10,288	36.23
Jessica Ho	7,423	26.14
Trevor McNeil	3,479	12.25
Arthur Tom	2,435	8.57
Lou Ann Bassan	2,169	7.64
Mike Murphy	1,176	4.14
Tuan Nguyen	848	2.99
Adam Kim	511	1.80
Write-in	68	0.24
Total votes	28,397	100.00

=== District 6 ===

Incumbent Supervisor Jane Kim was ineligible to run for reelection due to term limits. Matt Haney, Christine Johnson, Sonja Trauss and Jason Jones ran to succeed her.

District 6 supervisorial election, 2018
Candidate	Votes	%
Matt Haney	14,249	56.24
Christine Johnson	6,237	24.62
Sonja Trauss	4,759	18.78
Write-in	93	0.37
Total votes	25,338	100.00

=== District 8 ===

Incumbent Supervisor Jeff Sheehy was eligible to run for reelection in the June 5, 2018, special election. He ran for reelection against Rafael Mandelman and Lawrence "Stark" Dagesse. Mandelman won the seat, with 60% of the vote, while Sheehy received 38%. Mandelman was sworn in on July 11. Mandelman and Dagasse ran again in the November election, but Sheehy did not.

District 8 supervisorial election, 2018
Candidate	Votes	%
Rafael Mandelman	38,292	91.00
Lawrence Dagesse	3,554	8.45
Write-in	233	0.55
Total votes	42,079	100.00

=== District 10 ===

Incumbent Supervisor Malia Cohen was ineligible to run for reelection due to term limits. Candidates who ran to succeed her included president of the San Francisco Board of Education Shamann Walton, Theo Ellington, and Tony Kelly.

District 10 supervisorial election, 2018
Candidate	Votes	%
Shamann Walton	9,550	41.22
Tony Kelly	5,643	24.36
Theo Ellington	4,800	20.72
Uzuri Pease-Greene	1,304	5.63
Gloria Berry	954	4.12
Asale Chandler	799	3.45
Write-in	89	0.38
Neo Veavea (write-in)	30	0.13
Total votes	23,169	100.00
