= Joel Engardio =

American politician (born 1972)

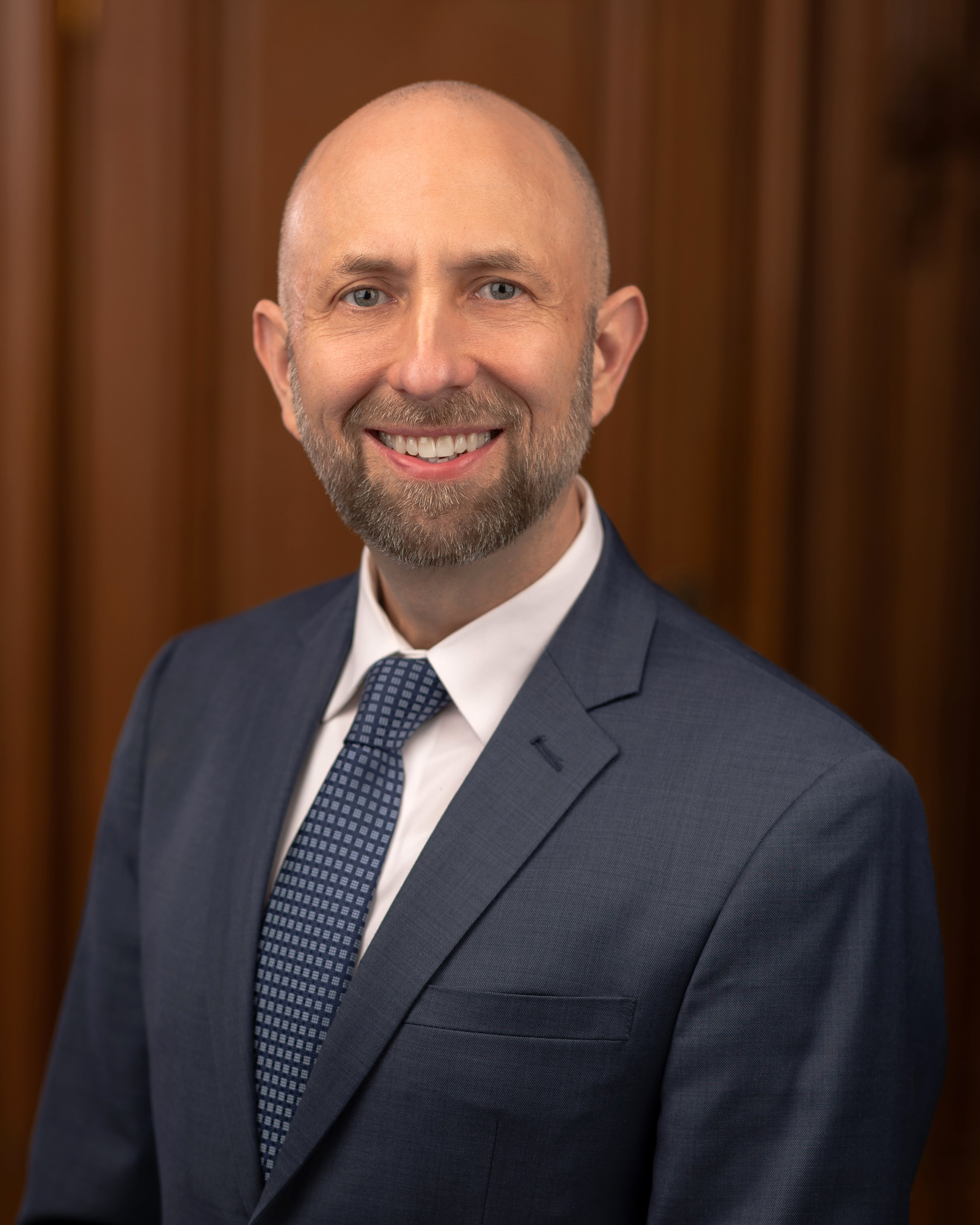
- Official portrait, 2023

Member of the San Francisco Board of Supervisors from the 4th district
- In office January 8, 2023 – October 18, 2025
- Preceded by: Gordon Mar
- Succeeded by: Beya Alcaraz

Personal details
- Born: September 17, 1972 (age 53) Saginaw, Michigan, U.S.
- Party: Democratic
- Spouse: Lionel Hsu (m. 2015)
- Education: Michigan State University (BA); Harvard University (MPA)

Chinese name
- Chinese: 殷嘉立
Transcriptions
Standard Mandarin
- Hanyu Pinyin: Yīn Jiālì
Yue: Cantonese
- Jyutping: Jan1 Gaa1 laap6

Joel P. Engardio (born September 17, 1972) is an American politician, writer, and public-safety advocate who represented District 4 on the San Francisco Board of Supervisors from 2023 until he was recalled in 2025.

== Early life and education ==
Engardio is a native of Saginaw, Michigan, where he attended Arthur Hill High School.

Engardio graduated with a bachelor's in journalism from Michigan State University and a Master of Public Administration from the Harvard Kennedy School of Government.

== Media career ==
Engardio is a former journalist. He moved to San Francisco in 1998 to cover Tom Ammiano's mayoral campaign during the 1999 San Francisco mayoral election.

Engardio and Tom Shepard directed the documentary Knocking about Jehovah's Witnesses.

== San Francisco Board of Supervisors ==
Engardio ran failed campaigns for District 7 supervisor in 2012, 2016, and 2020.

Engardio ran for District 4 supervisor after his neighborhood was redistricted from District 7. He was elected in November 2022, unseating incumbent Gordon Mar by a margin of 50.9% to 49.1%. Engardio is the first gay supervisor elected to represent the city's westside. Engardo was also the first candidate to defeat an incumbent supervisor elected in their own right, since district elections returned to San Francisco in 2000.

In 2023, Engardio organized the first night market in the Sunset District along with other community groups. The first event drew over an estimated 10,000 visitors. This spurred similar events in other neighborhoods, such as Chinatown and The Castro.

In 2023, Engardio authored Proposition G: Offering Algebra 1 to Eighth Graders. This proposition would encourage the San Francisco Unified School District to allow eighth graders to take Algebra I, in place of needing to wait until ninth grade.

Engardio was among five supervisors who placed Proposition K, which proposed closing two miles of the Great Highway in the Sunset District to cars and turning it into a public park, onto the November 5, 2024 election. The proposition passed with nearly 55%. A recall campaign was subsequently launched against Engardio, who represents the neighborhood. The new Sunset Dunes park opened in April 2025.

=== Recall election ===
In November 2024, a group of voters in the Sunset District launched a campaign to recall Engardio over his support of Proposition K, which was a ballot measure to close part of the Great Highway and turn it into a park. A recall petition was filed with the San Francisco Department of Elections in December 2024. While Proposition K passed with 55% of San Francisco residents voting in support, 64% of his constituents in District 4 voted against it. According to The Economist, "opposition to the new park is part of a larger battle locals are waging against change" and the residents want "more meetings, more input, more veto points for new development."

On May 20, 2025, the San Francisco Department of Elections confirmed that it had received 10,985 valid signatures, which is more than the 9,911 signatures that were required to put the recall on the ballot (20% of the voters in District 4). On September 16, 2025, Engardio was overwhelmingly recalled with 62.7% of the vote in favor of his removal, becoming the first supervisor to be successfully recalled by voters in the board's 169-year history. Mayor Daniel Lurie named Beya Alcaraz as Engardio's successor on November 6, 2025.

== Political stances ==
Engardio is categorized as a moderate. Engardio supported the 2022 recall of San Francisco District Attorney Chesa Boudin and the 2022 recall of three San Francisco Board of Education commissioners.

== Personal life ==
When he was elected to supervisor, Engardio lived in the Lakeshore neighborhood of San Francisco. He was raised a Jehovah's Witness, but he does not identify with the religion.

Engardio is gay. He has been married to Lionel Hsu since 2015.
