= Beya Alcaraz =

American former politician (born 1996)

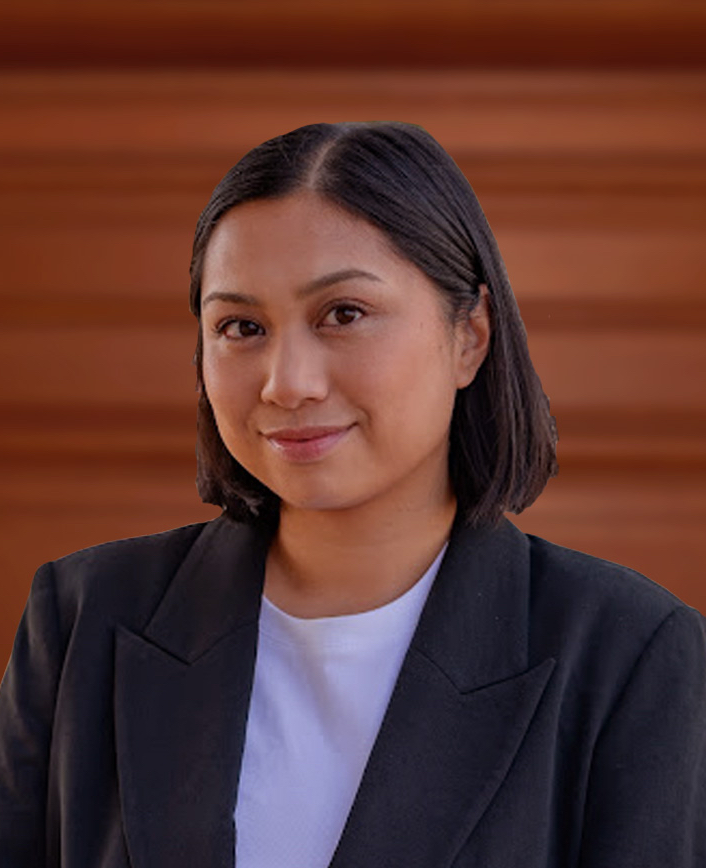
- Official portrait, 2025

Member of the San Francisco Board of Supervisors from the 4th district
- In office November 6, 2025 – November 13, 2025
- Appointed by: Daniel Lurie
- Preceded by: Joel Engardio
- Succeeded by: Alan Wong

Personal details
- Born: Isabella Alcaraz; November 6, 1996 (age 30) San Francisco, California, U.S.
- Party: Democratic
- Education: Diablo Valley College (attended); City College of San Francisco (attended)

Isabella "Beya" Alcaraz (born November 6, 1996) is an American former politician who briefly served as a member of the San Francisco Board of Supervisors from the 4th district from November 6 to November 13, 2025. She was the first person of Filipino descent to serve on the Board of Supervisors.

== Early life and education ==
Alcaraz is a lifelong resident of the Sunset District in San Francisco. She graduated from St. Ignatius College Preparatory in 2014 and attended Diablo Valley College and City College of San Francisco.

== Career ==
Alcaraz owned and operated The Animal Connection, a pet store in the Sunset, from 2019 to 2025, after working there for a summer during high school. In December 2025 Alcaraz was sued by the store landlord for alleged unpaid back rent and late fees.

She has taught art and music, performed music, and coached youth sports.

=== San Francisco Board of Supervisors ===
Alcaraz was appointed and sworn in as District 4 Supervisor by Mayor Daniel Lurie on November 6, 2025, following the recall of Joel Engardio in September. She had no previous experience in government or politics.

Alcaraz resigned after one week, following media reports of published text messages in which Alcaraz discussed paying employees off the books to avoid payroll taxes and intentionally claiming personal meals and alcohol purchases as business expenses to reduce her tax liability. These revelations, together with reporting that her former pet shop had left over a dozen animals dead due to neglect and poor sanitary conditions under her ownership, led Mayor Lurie to request her resignation. In a statement announcing Alcaraz's resignation, Mayor Lurie said, "I regret that I didn’t do more to make sure she could succeed."

== Personal life ==
Alcaraz was born to Filipino parents. She is a certified yoga instructor and has a black belt in karate.
