= Forest Knolls, San Francisco =

Forest Knolls
- Neighborhood of San Francisco
- Location within Central San Francisco
- Coordinates: 37°45′16″N 122°27′33″W

Government
  - Supervisor: Myrna Melgar
  - Assemblymember: Catherine Stefani (D)
  - State Senator: Scott Wiener (D)
  - U.S. House: Aisha Wahab (D)

Area
  - Total: 0.87 km^{2} (0.334 sq mi)
  - Land: 0.87 km^{2} (0.334 sq mi)

Population (2016)
  - Total: 3,238
  - Density: 3,740/km^{2} (9,690/sq mi)
- ZIP Code: 94116
- Area codes: 415/628

Forest Knolls is a neighborhood located on the West Side of San Francisco. Situated on the southwestern slope of Mount Sutro, the neighborhood is surrounded by an old growth eucalyptus forest. The main UCSF campus is located just north on Parnassus Avenue. The neighborhoods is bounded by Warren Drive to the south and west, Mount Sutro to the north and the Midtown Terrace neighborhood to the east. Homes are mostly fully detached and many have views of the San Francisco Bay or Pacific Ocean.
