= Gordon Mar =

American politician

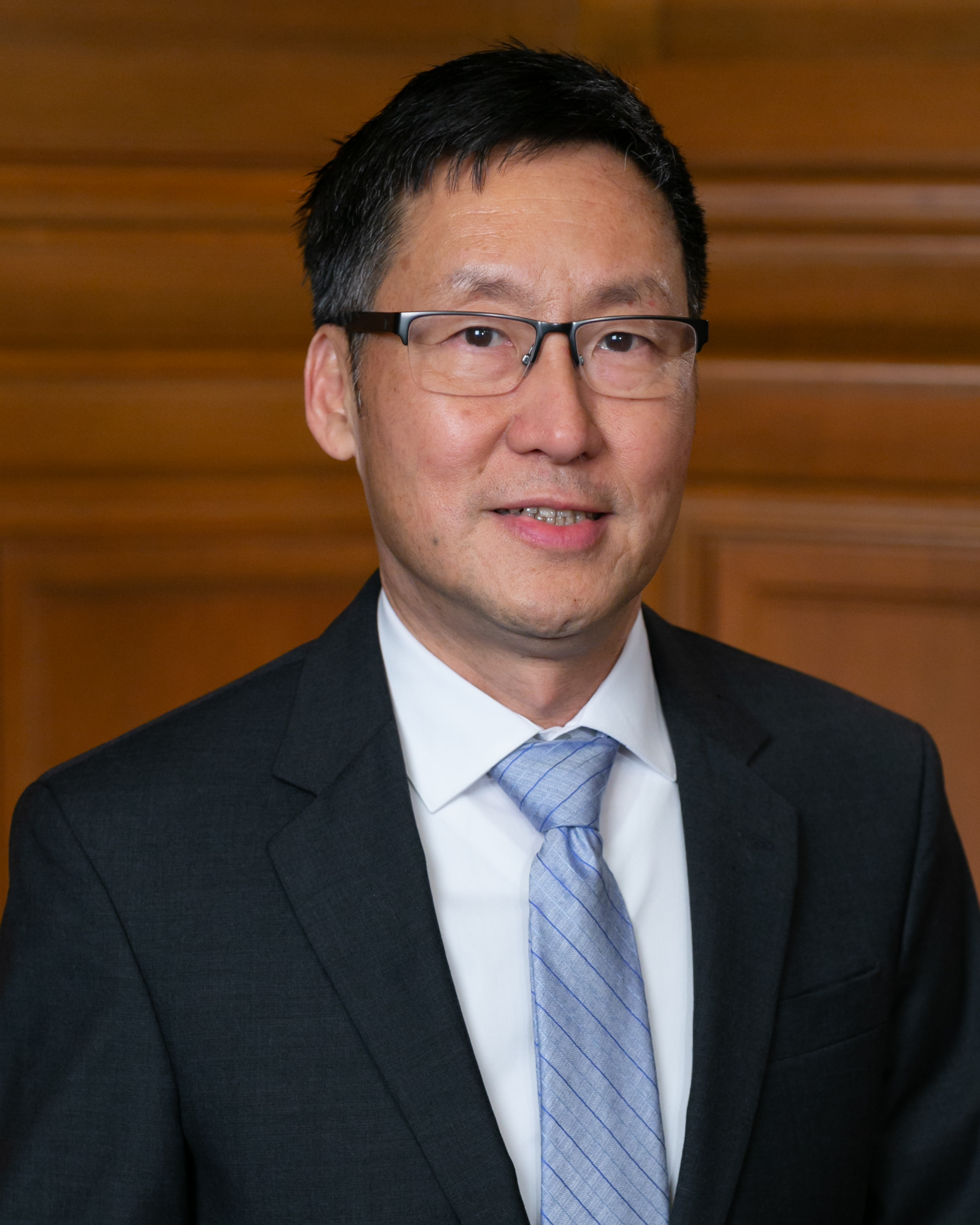
- Official portrait, 2019

Member of the San Francisco Board of Supervisors from the 4th district
- In office January 8, 2019 – January 8, 2023
- Preceded by: Katy Tang
- Succeeded by: Joel Engardio

Personal details
- Born: August 15, 1962 (age 64) Sacramento, California
- Party: Democratic
- Education: University of California, Berkeley (BS)
- Occupation: Politician

Chinese name
- Traditional Chinese: 馬兆明
- Simplified Chinese: 马兆明
Transcriptions
Standard Mandarin
- Hanyu Pinyin: Mǎ Zhàomíng
Yue: Cantonese
- Jyutping: Maa5 Siu6 ming4

Gordon Mar (born August 15, 1962) is an organizer for the National Union of Healthcare Workers and an American former politician from San Francisco. He was a member of the San Francisco Board of Supervisors from 2019 to 2023, and represented District 4. He is the twin brother of former District 1 supervisor Eric Mar.

District 4 includes the western San Francisco neighborhoods of Central Sunset, Outer Sunset, Parkside, Outer Parkside, and Pine Lake Park.

== Political career ==
He was the executive director of Jobs with Justice San Francisco and the Chinese Progressive Association.

=== San Francisco Board of Supervisors ===
After incumbent District 4 Supervisor Katy Tang declined to run for re-election in 2018, Mar filed papers to run for the District 4 seat in the November election. In the months leading up to the race, the campaigns of both Mar and his primary opponent, Jessica Ho, were criticized for "mudslinging" tactics. A Mar campaign staffer was caught tearing down a poster for Ho.

Mar was elected supervisor for District 4 on November 6, 2018, receiving 10,314 first preference votes (36.29 percent of all valid votes). After allocation of preferences from eliminated candidates in San Francisco's ranked-choice voting system, Mar received 56.84 percent of final-round votes, compared to 43.16 percent for runner-up Jessica Ho, an aide to the incumbent supervisor Katy Tang.

Mar led negotiations with San Francisco Mayor London Breed to fully fund City College of San Francisco's free tuition program for ten years beginning in 2019, and negotiated a deal to provide full reserve funding for raises for San Francisco Unified School District educators.

Mar has called on SFPD to release aggregated demographic data on Asian-American crime victims, following an increase in hate crimes in San Francisco and several high-profile attacks on members of the Chinese community, and announced legislation requiring this data to be released annually.

Mar is the author of a number of ordinances reforming San Francisco's electoral system and addressing money in politics, including 2019's Proposition F addressing pay-to-play politics, corporate contributions, and dark-money donations, and Public Financing 2.0, which tripled the impact of San Francisco's public financing program for elections.

In November 2022, Mar lost his bid for re-election to Joel Engardio. With this loss, Mar became the first elected supervisor in the ranked-choice era to lose a reelection bid.

==== Positions on housing ====
Mar spearheaded multiple Board of Supervisors resolutions which denounced California State Senator Scott Wiener's SB 50 bill, which would have legalized higher density housing development in areas close to public transit. When asked to explain why he voted to block the construction of a 495-unit apartment complex (with 25% affordable housing) on a Nordstrom valet parking lot in the South of Market neighborhood, Mar said there was an abundance of available "luxury units" in the neighborhood and families "can check Craigslist today" to find housing.

Mar opposed building a Navigation Center in District 4.

When asked to comment on legislation that would permit construction of fourplexes across the city, Mar said "a modest density increase to single-family zoning is certainly worth considering" in San Francisco but did not specify further. Later in 2021, amid debates to allow the construction of four housing units on lots previously designated for single-family housing, Mar proposed to prohibit the construction of market-rate housing on the upzoned lots.

In November 2021, Mar proposed to scale down a 98-unit low-income apartment complex in the Sunset District so that it would only have 80 units. Mar characterized this as a compromise between supporters and opponents of the apartment complex.

In January 2022, Mar defended the delay in approval for a $18.7 million grant to repurpose a hotel into a homeless shelter for upwards of 250 people. Mar said, "We’re all well aware of the urgency of this work. But I would echo the comments of my colleagues that we can’t use that urgency to go through a bad process."

=== San Francisco Democratic County Central Committee ===
Mar served on the San Francisco Democratic County Central Committee (DCCC). He resigned in October 2026, expressing anger at the committee's initial endorsement of Manny Yekutiel for the 2026 San Francisco Board of Supervisors election and stating that "the DCCC has essentially become a protection racket for wealthy donors and political insiders".

== Personal life ==
His father immigrated from Toisan, China. Mar was born in California. He came to San Francisco in 1988 after receiving a degree in Environmental Resource Studies from U.C. Berkeley, and has lived in the Sunset since 2005 with his wife Cecilia — a realtor — and their daughter, Lian.

== Additional sources ==
- San Francisco Department of Elections. "November 6, 2018 Election Results – Summary".
- San Francisco Department of Elections. "RCV Results Report: Board of Supervisors, District 4" (PDF) (pdf).
- Thadani, Trisha (November 27, 2018). "SF declares supervisor race winners: Stefani, Mar, Haney, Mandelman, Walton". San Francisco Chronicle.
