= Other Avenues Grocery Cooperative =

Worker cooperative, organic food grocery store

- Company type: Worker cooperative
- Industry: Grocery, Organic foods
- Founded: 1975
- Headquarters: 3930 Judah Street, San Francisco, California, United States
- Area served: San Francisco Bay Area
- Products: Organic food, bulk goods, produce, household items
- Number of employees: 17 (as of 2017)

Other Avenues Grocery Cooperative is a worker cooperative, organic food grocery store, and legacy business, located on in the Sunset district of San Francisco. It is one of two grocery cooperatives in San Francisco; the other being Rainbow Grocery Cooperative.

== History ==
Other Avenues Grocery Cooperative was established by volunteer staff in 1975, and many of the early shoppers were also volunteers. The co-op was a part of the People's Food System, a larger network of food co-operatives that developed in the San Francisco Bay Area in the 1970s. The collapse of the People's Food System created challenges for the store. Shanta Nimbark Sacharoff, a longtime worker-member, said: "It was really difficult, especially for a small store like this. We had 10 years that were so difficult financially and organizationally — we almost closed down three times — but the community was our strength. Because we’re so isolated, the community that lives near us is drawn to us." In 1982, the store moved to its current location at 3930 Judah Street, and it underwent a restructuring in 1987 that converted the store into a "hybrid consumer-co-op." During the 1980s, many businesses in the Outer Sunset closed down due to the recession, but the co-op survived due to community and worker support. In 1999, the store legally became a Worked-Owned Cooperative. In 2008, the cooperative bought the store space, with help from Arizmendi Bakery, Cheese Board Collective, Rainbow Grocery, Veritable Vegetable, and co-op members.

In 2016, a book about the co-op, "Other Avenues Are Possible” was published by PM Press. On January 20, 2017, the store was closed in protest of the inauguration of Donald Trump. The decision was reached by consensus among the 17 staff members. In 2018, the co-op became a Legacy Business in San Francisco. During the COVID-19 pandemic, no workers at the co-op lost their jobs, and some media publications speculated that co-operative businesses were better equipped to handle a pandemic.

The storefront has a mural by Carlo Grünfeld, a San Francisco artist.
