= Bay Area Medical Academy =

Coordinates: 37.7908°N 122.4060°W

- Type: Private for-profit college
- Established: 2005
- President: Simonida Cvejic
- Location: San Francisco, San Jose, California, United States
- Campus: Urban
- Website: bamasf.edu bama-institute.com

Bay Area Medical Academy (BAMA) is a private for-profit college with two campuses in California providing medical assisting with phlebotomy and EKG training. The school's campuses are in San Francisco and San Jose.

== History ==
Bay Area Medical Academy was founded in 2005 by CEO Simonida Cvejic. The school was launched and incubated at the Renaissance Center, a local entrepreneurship center funded by the San Francisco Mayor's Office of Economic Development.

Bay Area Medical Academy's sister school BAMA Institute was launched in 2017 and provides EKG technician and phlebotomy training.

Bay Area Medical Academy holds National Accreditation through Middle States Association.

Simonida Cvejic and Bay Area Medical Academy's story have been featured in several national publications, including Huffington Post, Forbes, and the San Francisco Chronicle.
