= Stephen Sherrill =

American politician

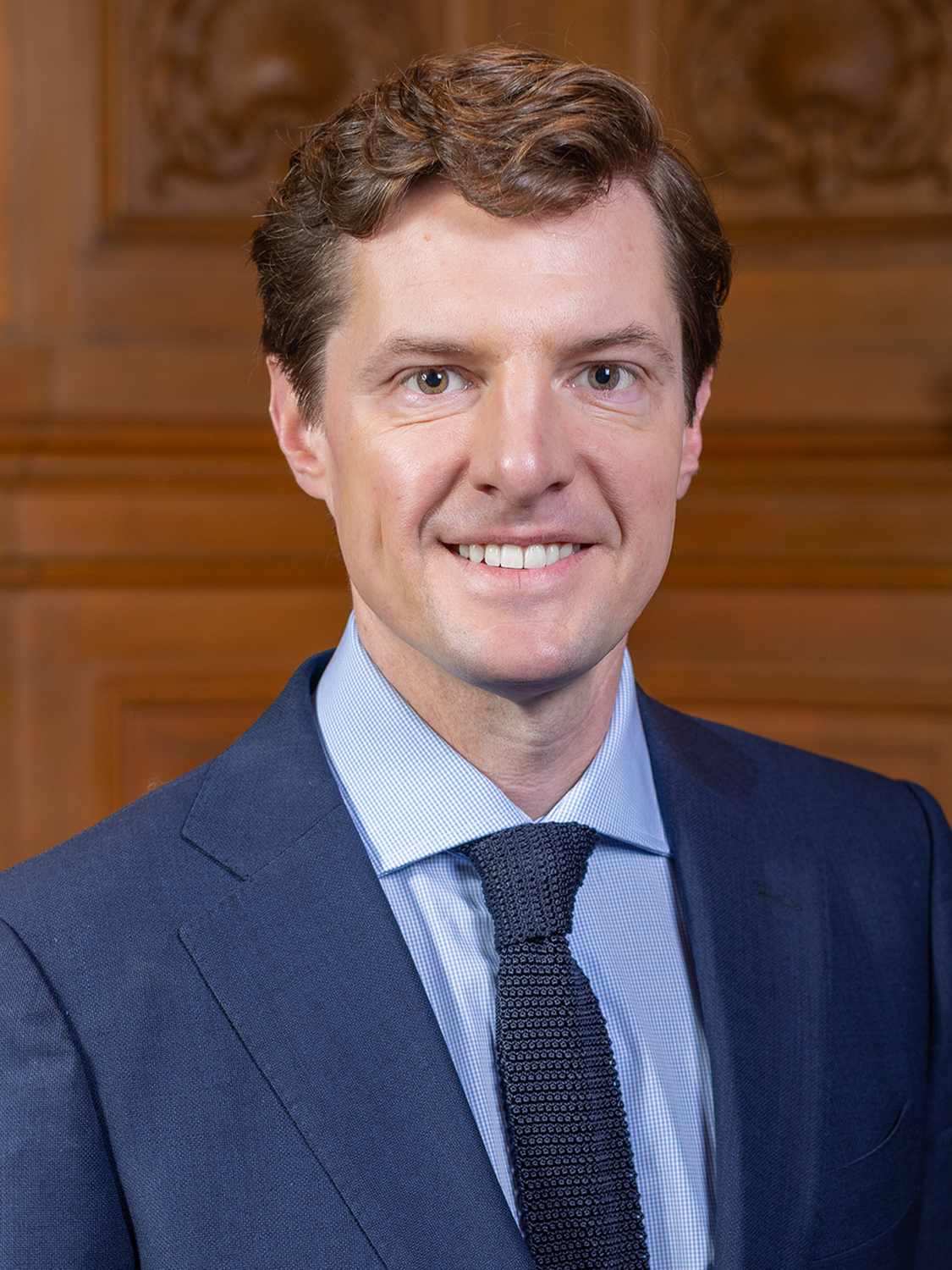
- Official portrait, 2025

Member of the San Francisco Board of Supervisors from the 2nd district
- Incumbent
- Assumed office December 18, 2024
- Preceded by: Catherine Stefani

Personal details
- Born: 1985/1986 (age 39–40)
- Party: Republican (before 2009); Independent (2009–2023); Democratic (2023–present)
- Education: Yale University (BA)

Stephen Sherrill (born 1985/1986) is an American politician. He serves on the San Francisco Board of Supervisors, representing District 2.

== Early life and education ==
Sherrill was born in New York. His father is Stephen Sherrill of Bruckmann, Rosser, Sherrill & Co. Sherrill graduated from Yale University in 2009. After graduation, he worked on Michael Bloomberg's 2009 New York City mayoral campaign.

== Career ==
Sherrill worked as director of the Mayor's Office of Innovation under San Francisco Mayor London Breed and political advisor to New York mayor Michael Bloomberg.

In the Office of Innovation, he worked with the Coordinated Street Response System to consolidate housing, health, and emergency response data so that outreach workers and program managers can better coordinate services for individuals living on the streets of San Francisco.

Prior to his work in the Office of Innovation, Sherrill was the COO of Golden, a volunteer management software platform, and ran marketing and e-commerce for an outdoor clothing brand.

== San Francisco Board of Supervisors ==
On December 18, 2024, Mayor London Breed appointed Sherrill to the San Francisco Board of Supervisors to serve out the rest of supervisor Catherine Stefani's term, ending in 2026, following her election to the California State Assembly in 2024.

== Personal life ==
Sherrill was previously registered as a Republican, having interned at the White House during the George W. Bush Administration. Sherrill changed his registration from Republican to Independent after the Barack Obama 2008 presidential campaign. He registered as a Democrat in 2023.

Sherrill resides in Presidio Heights.
