= Rafael Mandelman =

American politician (born 1973)

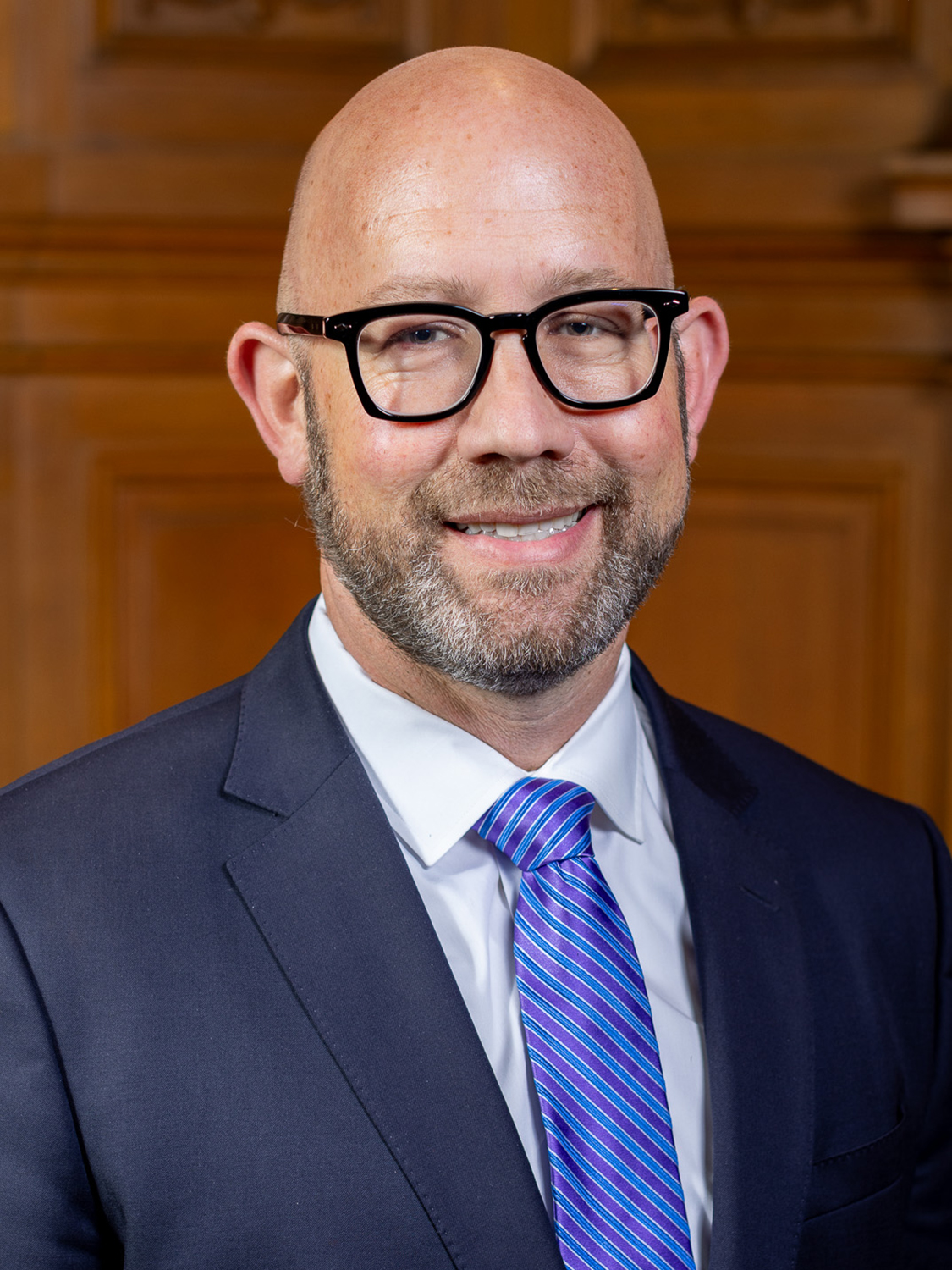
- Official portrait, 2025

President of the San Francisco Board of Supervisors
- Incumbent
- Assumed office January 8, 2025
- Preceded by: Aaron Peskin

Member of the San Francisco Board of Supervisors from the 8th district
- Incumbent
- Assumed office July 11, 2018
- Preceded by: Jeff Sheehy

Personal details
- Born: October 17, 1973 (age 53) San Francisco, California, U.S.
- Party: Democratic
- Education: Yale University (BA); Harvard University (MPP); University of California, Berkeley (JD)
- Website: Campaign website

Rafael Mandelman (born October 17, 1973) is an American attorney and politician currently serving as the president of the San Francisco Board of Supervisors, representing District 8.

== Early life ==
Mandelman grew up in Laguna Beach, California with his mother. His parents divorced when he was three. His mother had various mental disorders and was regularly in and out of the hospital. At 11 years old, his relatives convinced Mandelman to move to San Francisco, where his paternal grandmother was. But she was too old to take care of him so he lived between homes. Mandelman, who is Jewish, attended The Brandeis School of San Francisco and Lick-Wilmerding High School.

Mandelman earned a B.A. in History from Yale College, a Master of Public Policy from Harvard’s John F. Kennedy School of Government, and a J.D. from UC Berkeley’s School of Law.

== Political career ==
Mandelman ran to represent District 8 in the 2010 San Francisco Board of Supervisors election, placing second against Scott Wiener.

Mandelman was elected to the City College of San Francisco Board of Trustees in November 2012.

On January 8, 2025, Mandelman was elected unanimously as the President of the Board of Supervisors. He is the third LGBTQ+ Board President, and the first in over twenty years.

=== City College of San Francisco Trustee ===
Mandelman began his term on the Board of Trustees at the City College of San Francisco in January 2013. Six months into his term, the ACCJC announced it would terminate the accreditation of City College, subject to a one-year review and appeal period.

City Attorney, Dennis Herrera filed two law suits against the ACCJC alleging conflicts of interest and a faulty review process. This effectively delayed the sanction. Mandelman fought for five years to keep the accreditation of the school. In 2017, he and City College Chancellor Susan Lamb presented their efforts to satisfy the accrediting standards set forth by ACCJC, and the commission decided to remove its sanction.

=== San Francisco Supervisor ===
Mandelman defeated incumbent Jeff Sheehy to represent District 8 in the June 2018 San Francisco Board of Supervisors special election, replacing Sheehy for the duration of the term. Mandelman went on to win in the November general election.

In 2019, he authored an ordinance to create the Castro LGBTQ Cultural District; the ordinance was passed unanimously by the San Francisco Board of Supervisors.

==== Mental health and homelessness ====
Mandelman introduced legislation in 2018 to streamline the opening of more residential care facilities by removing the requirement that such facilities need to obtain conditional use permits if they are serving seven or more residents in several zoning districts, but not those zoned for single-family or two-family homes.

In 2019, Mandelman authored legislation implementing the housing conservatorship program created by Scott Wiener's SB 1045 for unhoused individuals suffering from severe mental illness and substance use disorder. Mandelman has repeatedly pushed for expansion of the City’s use of its existing conservatorship tools, and of State laws restricting eligibility for conservatorships.

In 2022, the Board of Supervisors unanimously passed an expanded version of Mandelman's 2020 “A Place for All” ordinance, making it the policy of the City and County of San Francisco to offer all people experiencing homelessness in the City a safe place to sleep.

==== Support of labor ====
Shortly after his 2018 election, Mandelman, alongside former supervisor John Avalos, was arrested for blocking a street outside Marriott's Westin St. Francis hotel during a Labor Day protest, organized by UNITE HERE Local 2, against Marriott's wages. In 2019, the Board's Public Safety and Neighborhood Services Committee held a hearing on "worker rights in the gig economy" called by Mandelman. In November 2020, the Board of Supervisors unanimously approved an ordinance authored by Mandelman and Supervisor Shamann Walton requiring San Francisco International Airport airlines and contractors to expand health care benefits for employees.

==== Positions on housing ====
Mandelman supported a resolution that expressed opposition to California Senate Bill 50, which mandates that localities allow denser housing near "job-rich" areas and transit hubs in California. In 2021, Mandelman proposed to allow construction of fourplexes on single lots in San Francisco. Mandelman's aide explained that the bill was intended to preempt California HOME Act (California Senate Bill 9, which was a new version of California Senate Bill 50), which Mandelman opposed. In 2022, the Board of Supervisors passed Mandelman's bill. Mayor London Breed vetoed the legislation, saying that the bill was intended to sidestep California state legislation to increase housing and that Mandelman's bill included provisions that would make it harder, not easier, to build more housing.

In October 2022, Mandelman brought a third version of the fourplex legislation to the Board of Supervisors, which passed and gained the support of the Mayor. This revised legislation allows fourplexes on every lot, allows six units on corner lots, and reduces the minimum ownership requirement to one year. Mandelman stated that this was "an important step in the right direction to increase density in San Francisco and puts us on the right path to add the capacity to meet our housing needs.”

In 2021, Mandelman opposed the construction of a 500-unit apartment complex on a Nordstrom's valet parking lot. He endorsed David Campos for California Assembly District 17. The San Francisco Chronicle tied this endorsement to Mandelman's vote to block the 500-unit housing construction project in Supervisor Matt Haney's district in San Francisco; Haney was running for the same district seat as Campos. According to the Chronicle, it is unusual for supervisors to block projects in the district of another supervisor if that supervisor approves of the project.

In 2018, Mandelman co-authored a bill increasing fines for the illegal demolition of homes in order to preserve rent-controlled housing and curb the loss of residential housing. He called for reform of the Ellis Act in 2018 to protect certain tenants from evictions. In 2018, Mandelman sponsored a resolution declaring public support for Proposition 10, which would repeal the Costa–Hawkins Rental Housing Act and thus allow local jurisdictions to create their own rent control rules.

In 2022, Mandelman cosponsored a resolution allowing for the financing of a 35-unit multifamily affordable housing project and a 100-unit multifamily rental affordable housing development with priority given to educators and San Francisco Unified School District Employees.

Mandelman was wary of developing high-rise buildings along San Francisco's waterfront. In 2024, Mandelman voted to override Mayor London Breed's veto of legislation that imposed height and density restrictions on housing in the northeast waterfront and Jackson Square.

In May 2024, Mandelman cosponsored a resolution authorizing the sale of housing revenue bonds not to exceed $64,846,000 to fund the construction of a 90-unit multifamily rental housing project known as "2550 Irving".

In October 2024, Mandelman cosponsored a resolution with Mayor Breed and Supervisor Ronen to acquire 3300, 3306, and 3308 Mission Street to develop 100% affordable housing, which was passed by the Board of Supervisors.

==== Business Tax Reform - Prop M ====
In October 2022, Mandelman requested the City Controller and Treasurer study how the trend towards remote work is challenging the current business tax system. After Property Tax, the taxes San Francisco imposes on businesses makes up the second-largest source of tax revenue. The report, delivered by the Controller's office on July 12, 2023 identified remote work as a stressor on San Francisco's commercial office market and concluded that there were risks associated with taxes that are based on office leasing and sales activity.

In February 2024, the Office of the Treasurer and Tax Collector and the Office of the Controller released recommendations for reform to the business tax system based on the findings of the initial report, with the intention that these recommendations would form a ballot measure for the November 2024 election. The tax reform goals included reducing risk of tax loss, reducing the tax base's reliance on the value of commercial property, reducing the volatility from relying on business taxes from a small number of large businesses, simplifying the overall tax structure, and providing greater equity for small businesses. A final proposal of recommendations was released by the City and County of San Francisco in May 2024.

In July 2024, the ballot measure qualified for the November ballot. In November 2024, voters voted to approve Prop M. The approval of Prop M will lead to a tax cut for thousands of businesses, raise taxes on some, assist in the retention of businesses, and assist the city's economic recovery in a remote and hybrid work environment.

==== Environment ====
In 2019, Mandelman authored a resolution declaring a climate emergency in San Francisco that was passed by the Board of Supervisors. In June 2020, Mandelman introduced legislation to improve building safety and reduce carbon emissions by prohibiting the use of natural gas in new constructions. The legislation was created with input from the San Francisco Department of Environment to address San Francisco's climate goals and to improve overall air quality.

In November 2020, the Board of Supervisors voted unanimously to pass Mandelman's "all-electric" building ordinance, becoming the largest city in California to do so. This phasing out of gas was a crucial step in moving the state towards cleaner electric alternatives to heating, cooling and cooking.

== Personal life ==
Mandelman came out as gay while at Yale University.
