= Shamann Walton =

American politician

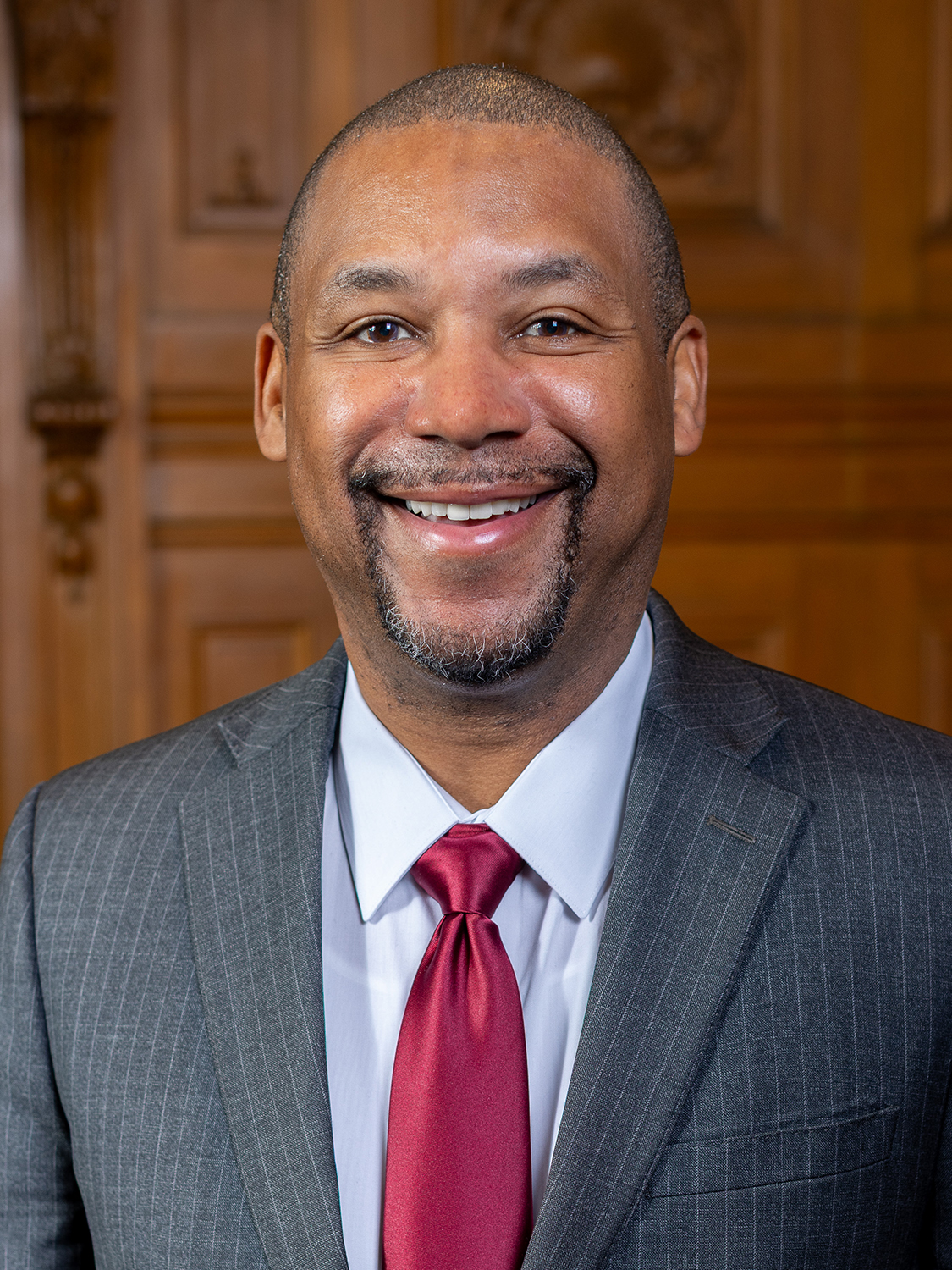
- Official portrait, 2025

President of the San Francisco Board of Supervisors
- In office January 8, 2021 – January 8, 2023
- Preceded by: Norman Yee
- Succeeded by: Aaron Peskin

Member of the San Francisco Board of Supervisors from the 10th district
- Incumbent
- Assumed office January 8, 2019
- Preceded by: Malia Cohen

Personal details
- Born: 1974/1975 (age 51–52)
- Party: Democratic
- Education: Morris Brown College (BA); San Francisco State University (MPA)
- Website: Board website

Shamann Walton (born 1974/1975) is an American politician. He has been a member of the San Francisco Board of Supervisors since 2019, representing District 10, and served as president of the Board from January 8, 2021, to January 8, 2023. Walton earlier served on the San Francisco Board of Education and was its president immediately prior to his election as supervisor.

== Early life ==
Walton was born in San Francisco and raised by his mother in San Francisco and Vallejo, California. His teenage years were often troubled; he was expelled from the Vallejo City Unified School District and was in juvenile hall numerous times.

Walton graduated from Morris Brown College in Atlanta, Georgia, in 1998. He received his master's degree in public administration from San Francisco State University in 2010.

== San Francisco Board of Supervisors ==
Walton was elected supervisor for District 10 on November 6, 2018, receiving 9,550 first preference votes (41% of all valid votes). After allocation of preferences from eliminated candidates in San Francisco's ranked-choice voting system, Walton received 63% of final-round votes, to runner-up Tony Kelly's 37%. He was sworn in at the Board of Supervisors' January 8, 2019, meeting, replacing Malia Cohen, who was ineligible to run for re-election after two four-year terms and had been elected to the California Board of Equalization.

The Board elected Walton its president in 2021.

=== Housing ===
Walton was the only member of the Board of Supervisors to explicitly reject a potential plan to allow four-plexes in San Francisco in areas previously restricted to single-family housing (which had been implemented in the state capital of Sacramento). He stated that the Sacramento bill "would speed up the gentrification" and "this policy is bad for San Francisco."

In 2019, Walton supported a resolution that expressed opposition to California Senate Bill 50, which mandates denser housing near "job-rich" areas and transit hubs.

=== Policing ===
In December 2018, Walton and supervisor Hillary Ronen put forth legislation calling to close San Francisco's youth detention center by December 2021.

In June 2020, during the nationwide George Floyd protests, he introduced a resolution to ban the San Francisco Police Department and Sheriff's Department from hiring officers with a history of serious misconduct. In October, he introduced the CAREN act, which would make fraudulent emergency telephone calls motivated by racism illegal.

=== Racial issues ===
In February 2020, Walton put forth a resolution calling for reparations for the city's African American population. The resolution established a working group to further develop the plan. In February 2023, a hearing on the reparations proposal was postponed while Walton was on a trip to Colombia; during the trip, he posted a photograph from a Hooters restaurant in Medellin.

In July 2022, Walton admitted to using a racial slur, specifically the N-word, against an African American sheriff's cadet at San Francisco City Hall because he was frustrated with having to take off his belt for metal detectors. Walton was later determined by the city's human resources director to have retaliated against the cadet for filing a report, in violation of city policy.

In 2024, Walton passed an ordinance which declares Vietnamese an official language of San Francisco. As a rationale for the change, Supervisor Walton stated, "San Francisco is home to many diverse immigrant communities and is a national leader in providing language access services with one of the strongest and most comprehensive local language access laws."

=== Transportation ===
In July 2020, Walton and supervisor Aaron Peskin opted to not introduce a $100 million sales tax measure into the November 2020 ballots to finance Caltrain, which has seen a 95% reduction in ridership due to the COVID-19 pandemic in California. Ride fares account for 70% of the service's operating budget. The supervisors cite the lack of shared authority on the Joint Powers Board over the train line's management, which was operated by the SamTrans, and the regressive nature of the sales tax to fund operations for a service whose customer base has a mean income of $120,000 as pain points to supporting the measure. However, Peskin mentioned that the measure can still be introduced by the mayor or other supervisors if they wanted to. The supervisors later changed their minds when Caltrain pledged to make changes to its structure, making it more independent from SamTrans.

During the COVID-19 pandemic, a portion of John F. Kennedy Drive in Golden Gate Park was made car-free. Walton and Ahsha Safaí opposed keeping the road car-free after the pandemic. Walton argued that keeping JFK Drive car-free was segregationist and recreational redlining. Data obtained by the San Francisco Recreation & Parks Department showed that no district showed a change in its proportion of overall visits to JFK Drive by more than 1.5% during the pandemic, with Walton's District 10 showing a decrease of 0.3%.

=== San Francisco Parks Alliance ===
Walton has taken a leading role in responding to the San Francisco Parks Alliance financial scandal. He has publicly criticized the Parks Alliance for betraying the trust of community organizations, stating: "These are not just numbers on paper. These are funds raised and entrusted by community members, volunteers, and nonprofit staff who are now scrambling to recover from this betrayal". Walton's focus is on understanding the full extent of the financial losses, how the nonprofit was able to use city and community resources for its own operations, and how the city can recover the outstanding funds. He has expressed concern for the dozens of small organizations left in financial limbo by the Alliance's collapse.

His office sent written questions to the Parks Alliance's leadership requesting detailed financial records, including balance sheets for each fiscally sponsored group and proof that restricted funds were not misused. These requests went unanswered, prompting Walton to issue subpoenas to ex-CEOs Robert Ogilvie and Drew Becher, and former treasurer Rick Hutchinson. The subpoenas are intended to compel testimony and the production of financial documents to determine how the funds were misspent and what happened to the money entrusted by community groups.

Walton has worked alongside Supervisor Jackie Fielder, who called for a full audit of the San Francisco Recreation and Park Department's relationship with the Parks Alliance, to ensure broader oversight and prevent similar issues in the future.

== Ethics fine ==
In July 2026, Walton agreed to a $4,500 fine imposed by the San Francisco Ethics Commission for accepting gifts valued more than the allowable annual limit and for not reporting those gifts.

== Publications ==
In 2023, Walton published an autobiography, From Juvenile Hall to City Hall: Your Resume Can Change.

== Personal life ==
Walton has two children.

== Sources ==
- San Francisco Department of Elections. "November 6, 2018 Election Results – Summary".
- San Francisco Department of Elections. "RCV Results Report: Board of Supervisors, District 10" (PDF) (pdf).
