= Catherine Stefani =

American attorney and politician (born 1969)

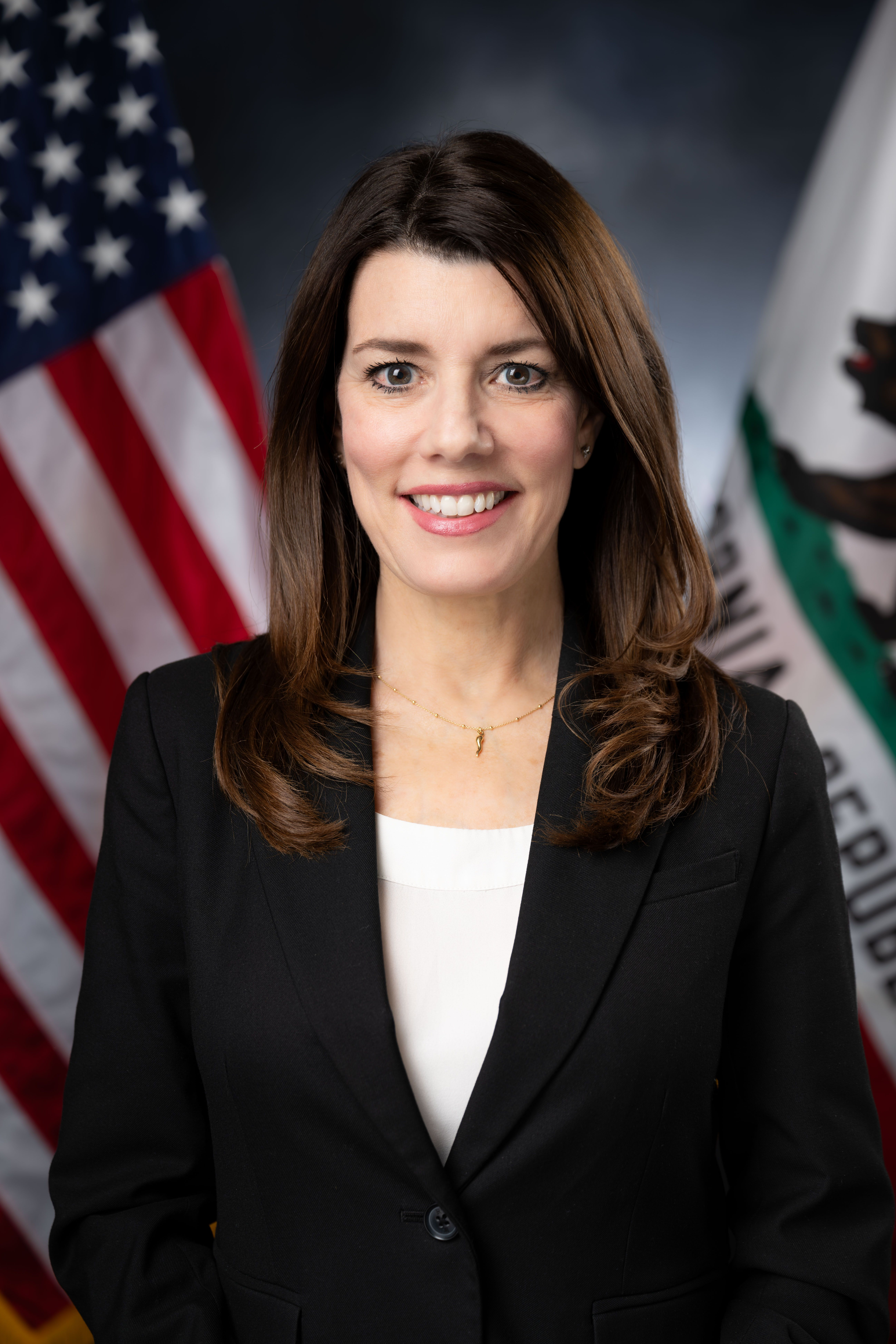
- Official portrait, 2024

Member of the California State Assembly from the 19th district
- Incumbent
- Assumed office December 2, 2024
- Preceded by: Phil Ting

Member of the San Francisco Board of Supervisors from the 2nd district
- In office January 30, 2018 – December 2, 2024
- Preceded by: Mark Farrell
- Succeeded by: Stephen Sherrill

Personal details
- Party: Democratic
- Children: 2
- Education: Saint Mary's College of California (BA); University of the Pacific (JD, LLM)
- Occupation: Politician
- Website: California State Assembly website

Catherine Michele Stefani is an American attorney and politician serving as a member of the California State Assembly for the 19th district since 2024. She previously served on the San Francisco Board of Supervisors from 2018 to 2024, representing District 2.

== Early life and education ==
Stefani earned a bachelor's degree in government from Saint Mary's College of California, followed by a Master of Laws and Juris Doctor from the University of the Pacific's McGeorge School of Law. In 1995, she was admitted to the State Bar of California.

== Career ==
=== Early career ===
After graduating from law school, she was a deputy district attorney in Contra Costa County. She was an aide to San Jose Vice Mayor Cindy Chavez and California State Assembly member Herb Wesson. Stefani served as a legislative aide to San Francisco Supervisors Michela Alioto-Pier (2007–2011) and Mark Farrell (2011–2016).

From 2000 to 2003, Stefani developed, hosted, and produced For The Record, a television show about legal issues. She is a spokesperson for Moms Demand Action for Gun Sense in America and the co-founder and former leader of the group's San Francisco chapter. She was on the Board of Directors of the Homeless Prenatal Program. She graduated from Emerge America and has been a supporter of the organization.

=== San Francisco County Clerk ===
Stefani was appointed as the San Francisco County Clerk by Mayor Ed Lee on January 29, 2016.

=== San Francisco Board of Supervisors ===
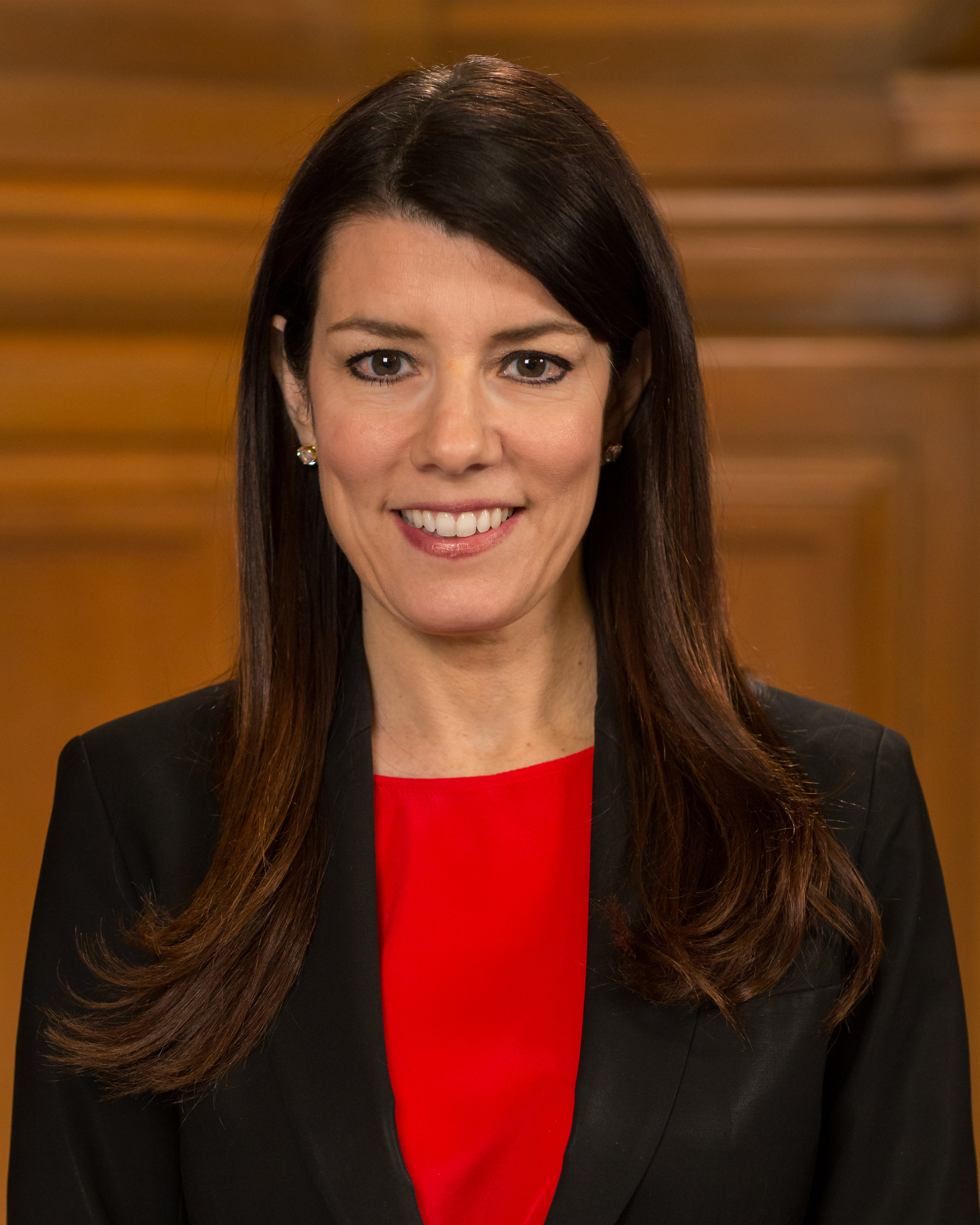
Stefani's official portrait as a Supervisor, 2018

When Mark Farrell resigned as District 2 Supervisor to become Mayor of San Francisco in January 2018, he selected Stefani as his successor. An hour after she was sworn in, Stefani formally declared her candidacy for the position in the upcoming November election and went on to win election to a full term.

==== Housing and transit ====
In 2024, Stefani voted to override Mayor London Breed's veto of legislation that prevented dense housing in the northeast waterfront and Jackson Square. She argued that the bill, which imposed height and density restrictions on developments, would "enable housing projects to maximize density while protecting the established historic districts already rich with community culture."

In 2019, Stefani voted for a resolution to declare a state of emergency for traffic injuries and deaths in San Francisco, reaffirming the city's 2014 Vision Zero commitment. However, Stefani has opposed public bikeshare in District 2 in private meetings with residents and has not advocated for the expansion of protected bike lanes and transit in the district.

==== Economy ====
In September 2020, during the COVID-19 pandemic crisis, Stefani was the lone vote in dissent of the budget proposal, declaring it "fiscally irresponsible."

In response to a pay-to-play corruption scandal in which city officials were arrested for taking bribes in exchange for awarding city contracts, in July 2020 Stefani introduced the "No GRAFT Act". The legislation closes a loophole in the city's contract procedures to prevent corruption.

==== Mental health services ====
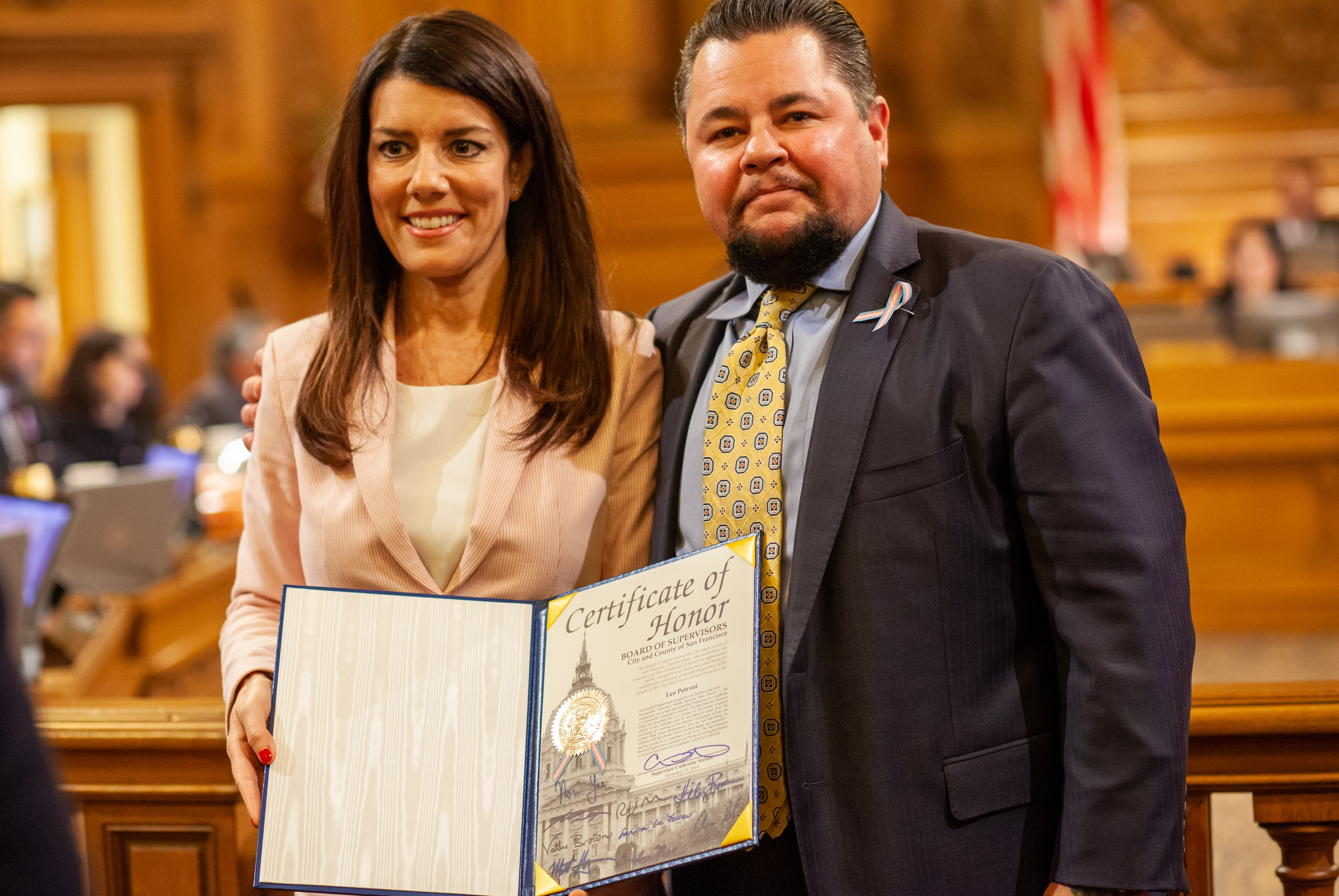
Stefani presenting a certificate of honor to Leo Petroni, 2019

In May 2020, Stefani resigned from her position on the Behavioral Health Commission Board after she raised questions regarding alleged financial impropriety, contract mismanagement, and the Board's application for, and acceptance of, a Paycheck Protection Program loan from the Small Business Administration. She introduced legislation to end the contract between the commission and the nonprofit contracted to provide staffing and support, seeking to reform the Commission "to eliminate any corrupt or inappropriate behavior in its administration."

In February 2019 Stefani challenged the renewal of a multi-million dollar contract with another mental health services provider pointing out that the organization "are not scoring highly on RFPs, have not always met standards and are not at their budgeted level of deliverables".

In March 2019 Stefani called for a hearing to investigate the lack of mental health services available to San Francisco's homeless population, and requested more hospital beds for those who need psychiatric treatment.

==== Crime and policing ====
In response to an increase of car break-ins in early 2018, Stefani called for a series of hearings with the San Francisco Police Department. Later that year, after a successful test of increased security at two San Francisco municipal garages, Stefani called for the increased security methods to be implemented at all 22 public garages. In October 2020 she called for a red light camera at an intersection in her district where a pedestrian had been killed earlier that year.

==== Gun violence prevention ====
Shortly after taking office, Stefani introduced the Free Speech Protection Act prohibiting firearms within 500 ft (150 m) of public events of 50 people or more such as protests, marches and rallies. Law enforcement is excepted from the prohibition. After the Gilroy Garlic Festival shooting, Stefani introduced a resolution that designated the National Rifle Association of America a domestic terrorist organization. On September 4, 2019, the Board of Supervisors passed the resolution with a unanimous vote. In April 2019 she requested the San Francisco City Attorney draft legislation to implement gun violence restraining orders which would allow firearms to be temporarily seized from owners who pose a safety risk to themselves or others.

==== Other ====
After the closing of the Clay Theater, an historic single-screen movie theater, in March 2020 Stefani introduced legislation to require that single-screen theaters be used for no other purpose, unless a conditional use permit was granted.

In 2018, after much objection by the Italian-American community over the renaming of Columbus Day to Indigenous Peoples' Day, Stefani – who is of Italian descent – introduced compromise legislation: an ordinance declaring that the day also be recognized as Italian Heritage Day. When the Christopher Columbus statue at Coit Tower was removed by city officials in June 2020 during the George Floyd protests, Stefani supported the removal, noting Columbus's legacy of "the painful foundations of American history — the slavery, subjugation and conquest we must all condemn."

In October 2018, Stefani co-sponsored an ordinance to require 30% of the city's public artworks depicting historical figures to be of women. The first monument to be erected would depict poet and civil rights activist Maya Angelou. The San Francisco Arts Commission's selection panel recommended visual artist Lava Thomas' proposal, a 9-foot tall bronze book with Angelou's face and quote etched onto it. However, the proposal was rejected by the commission's Visual Arts Committee. Stefani led this decision, calling for the SFAC to restart the selection process with clearer criteria for a what constituted a monument. Stefani justified this decision, according to the San Francisco Examiner, stating, "As I carried the legislation across the finish line to elevate women in monuments, I wanted to do it in the same way that men have been historically elevated in this city." This decision to confirm Thomas' proposal sparked public backlash. Stefani subsequently apologized and Thomas' proposal was accepted in November 2020.

In June 2020, amid the COVID-19 pandemic, she was the only member of the Board of Supervisors to vote against a pandemic eviction moratorium.

In November 2024, she was the only member of the Board of Supervisors to not endorse Proposition L — a ride-hailing tax to fund Muni.

She raised over $2 million for her November 2024 campaign for California State Assembly. Financial disclosures are available on the California Secretary of State website.

== Personal life ==
Stefani lives in Cow Hollow, San Francisco. She and her husband have two children.

== Electoral history ==
2024 California State Assembly 19th district election
Primary election
Party	Candidate	Votes	%
Democratic	Catherine Stefani	64,973	57.0
Democratic	David Lee	33,047	29.0
Republican	Nadia Flamenco	8,337	7.3
Republican	Arjun Sodhani	7,632	6.7
Total votes		113,989	100.0
General election
Democratic	Catherine Stefani	118,928	60.5
Democratic	David Lee	77,546	39.5
Total votes		196,474	100.0
Democratic hold			
