= San Francisco Board of Supervisors =

City legislature in San Francisco, California, US

Type
- Type: Unicameral
- Term limits: Two terms (eight years) (Note: In June 2026, San Francisco voters passed a lifetime term limit for those serving on the Board of Supervisors and those who have served as Mayor to be two terms.)

Leadership
- President: Rafael Mandelman since January 8, 2025

Structure
- Seats: 11
- Political groups: Officially nonpartisan: Democratic (11)
- Length of term: 4 years

Elections
- Voting system: Instant runoff voting Single-member districts
- Last election: November 5, 2024
- Next election: November 3, 2026

Meeting place
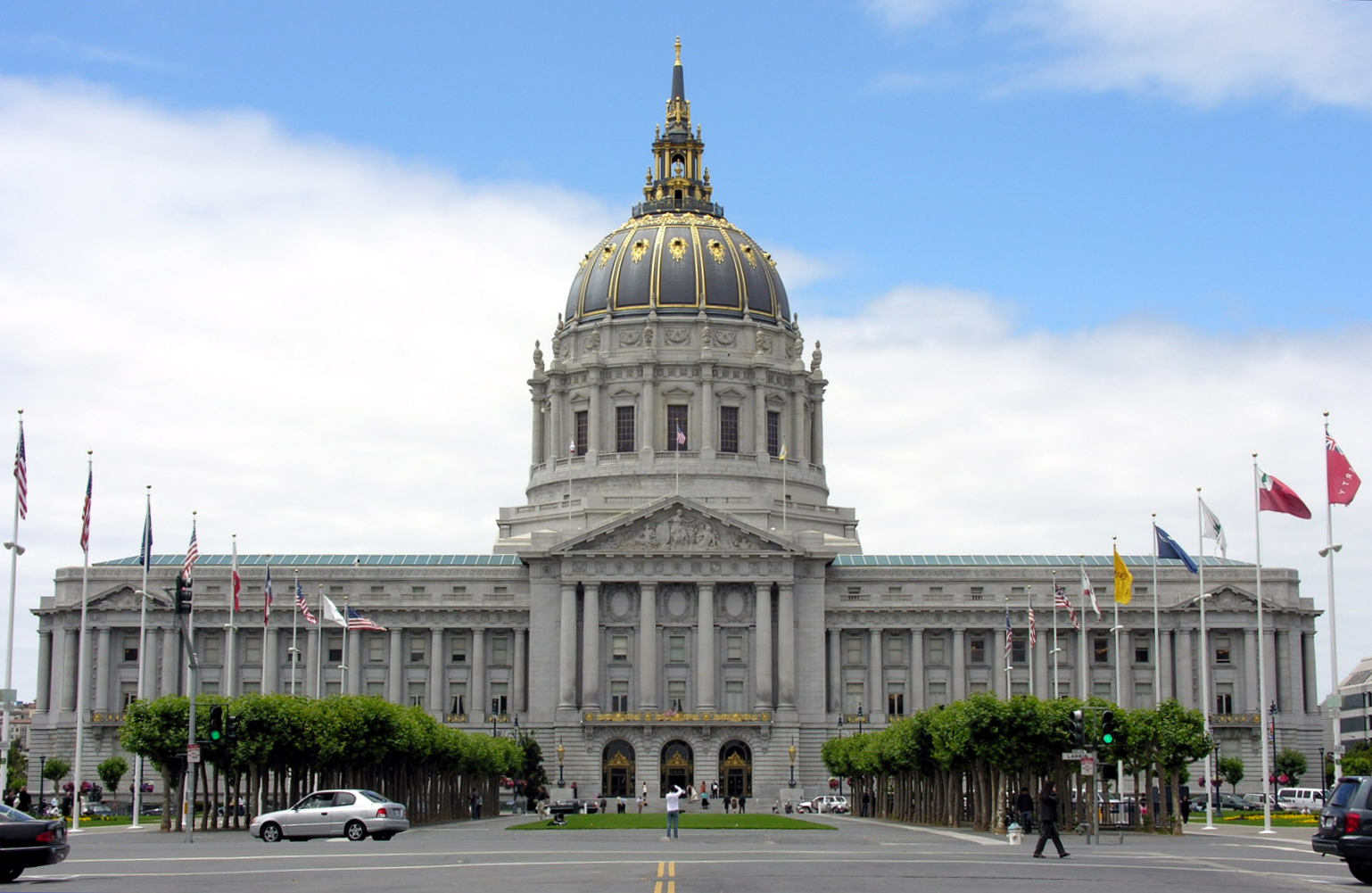
- San Francisco City Hall; San Francisco, California

Website
- San Francisco Board of Supervisors

The San Francisco Board of Supervisors is the legislative body within the government of the City and County of San Francisco in the U.S. state of California.

== Government and politics ==
The City and County of San Francisco is a consolidated city-county, being simultaneously a charter city and charter county with a consolidated government, a status it has had since 1856. Since it is the only such consolidation in California, it is therefore the only California city with a mayor who is also the county executive, and a county board of supervisors that also acts as the city council.

Whereas the overall annual budget of the city and county is about $9 billion as of 2016, various legal restrictions and voter-imposed set-asides mean that the Board of Supervisors can allocate only about $20 million directly without constraints, according to its president's chief of staff.

== Salaries ==
Members of the San Francisco Board of Supervisors are paid $175,370 per year, as of fiscal year 2025–2026.

== Election ==
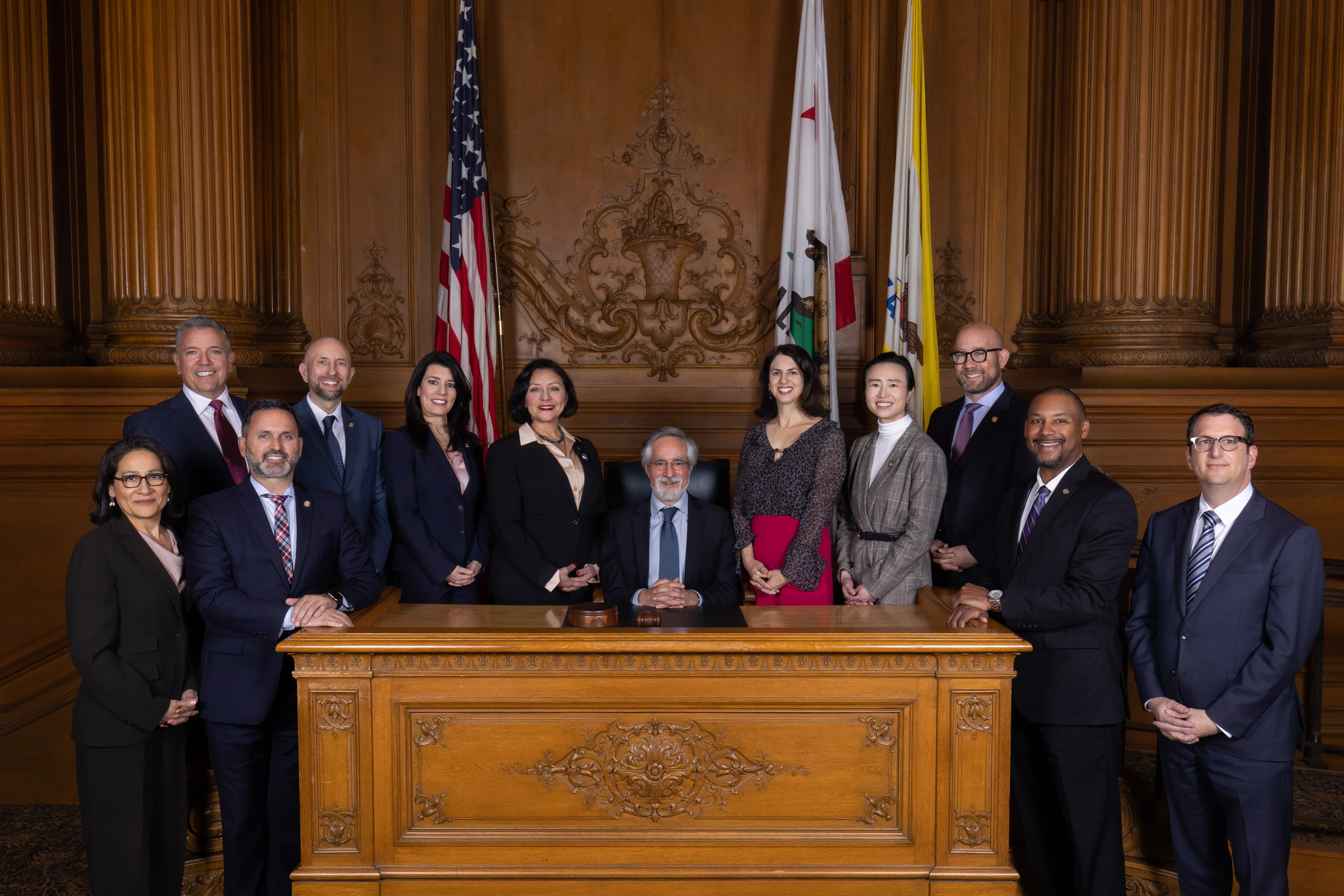
The Board of Supervisors in early 2023, with Board President Aaron Peskin seated in the center.

There are 11 members of the Board of Supervisors, each representing a geographic district (see below). The current board president is Rafael Mandelman, who represents District 8.

How the Board of Supervisors should be elected has been a matter of contention in recent San Francisco history. Throughout the United States, almost all cities and counties with populations in excess of 200,000 divide the jurisdiction into electoral districts to achieve a geographical distribution of members from across the community. But San Francisco, notwithstanding a population of over 700,000, was often an exception.

Prior to 1977 and again from 1980 through 2000, the Board of Supervisors was chosen in at-large elections, with all candidates appearing together on the ballot. The person who received the most votes was elected President of the Board of Supervisors, and the next four or five (depending on how many seats were up for election) were elected to seats on the board. District elections were enacted by Proposition T in November 1976. The first district-based elections in 1977 resulted in a radical change to the composition of the Board, including the election of Harvey Milk, only the third openly gay or lesbian individual (and the first gay man) elected to public office in the United States. (Previously in 1961, José Sarria's run for the Board had made him the first openly gay candidate for public office in the United States.) Following the assassinations of Supervisor Milk and Mayor George Moscone a year later by former Supervisor Dan White, district elections were deemed divisive and San Francisco returned to at-large elections until the current system was implemented in 2000.

District elections were repealed by Proposition A in August 1980 by a vote of 50.58% Yes to 49.42% No. An attempt was made to reinstate district elections in November 1980 with Proposition N but it failed by a vote of 48.42% Yes to 51.58% No. District elections were reinstated by Proposition G in November 1996, taking effect in 2000 with a November runoff. Runoffs were eliminated and replaced with instant-runoff voting with Proposition A in March 2002, taking effect in 2004. Under the current system, supervisors are elected district to four-year terms. The City Charter provides a term limit of two successive four-year terms and requires supervisors to be out of office for four years after the expiration of their second successive term before rejoining the Board, through election or appointment, again. A partial term counts as a full term if the supervisor is appointed and/or elected to serve more than two years of it.

The terms are staggered so that only half of the 11-member board is elected every two years, thereby providing continuity. Supervisors representing odd-numbered districts are elected every fourth year counted from 2000. Supervisors representing even-numbered districts were elected to transitional two-year terms in 2000, thereafter to be elected every fourth year beginning 2002. Terms of office begin on the January 8 following the regular election for each seat. Each supervisor is required to live in their district, and although elections are held on a non-partisan basis without party labels on the ballot, as of 2018 all 11 supervisors are known to be members of the Democratic Party. The most recent supervisorial elections were held on November 5, 2024. The President of the Board of Supervisors, under the new system, is elected by the members of the Board from among their number. This is typically done at the first meeting of the new session commencing after the general election, or when a vacancy in the office arises.

== Districts ==
Members of the Board of Supervisors are elected from 11 single-member districts. The districts cover the following neighborhoods, approximately.

Interactive map of San Francisco Board of Supervisors districts since 2022

District	Map	Supervisor	Neighborhoods and areas represented	Party (officially nonpartisan)
District 1		Connie Chan	Inner Richmond, Central Richmond, Outer Richmond, Vista del Mar, Seacliff, Lake District, Presidio Terrace, Lone Mountain, Golden Gate Park, Lincoln Park, and the University of San Francisco	Democratic
District 2		Stephen Sherrill	Marina, Cow Hollow, Pacific Heights, Presidio Heights, Jordan Park, Laurel Heights, Presidio, Lower Pacific Heights, Cathedral Hill, and part of Russian Hill	Democratic
District 3		Danny Sauter	North Beach, Chinatown, Telegraph Hill, North Waterfront, Financial District, Nob Hill, Union Square, Maiden Lane, and part of Russian Hill	Democratic
District 4		Alan Wong	Central Sunset, Outer Sunset, Parkside, Outer Parkside, Pine Lake Park, Lakeshore, Merced Manor, and the Farallon Islands	Democratic
District 5		Bilal Mahmood	Haight Ashbury, Lower Haight, Fillmore, Western Addition, North Panhandle, Japantown, Hayes Valley, Tenderloin, and Civic Center	Democratic
District 6		Matt Dorsey	Mid-Market, Rincon Hill/East Cut, South of Market, South Beach, Mission Bay, Treasure Island, Yerba Buena Island, and Alcatraz	Democratic
District 7		Myrna Melgar	Inner Parkside, Golden Gate Heights, Inner Sunset, Parnassus Heights, Clarendon Heights, part of Twin Peaks, West Portal, Forest Knolls, Midtown Terrace, Forest Hill, Miraloma Park, Sunnyside, Sherwood Forest, Westwood Highlands, Westwood Park, St. Francis Wood, Monterey Heights, Mt. Davidson, Balboa Terrace, Ingleside Terraces, Stonestown, Lakeside, Parkmerced, Lake Merced, City College, San Francisco State, part of Ashbury Heights, and part of UCSF Parnassus Heights	Democratic
District 8		Rafael Mandelman	The Castro, Noe Valley, Diamond Heights, Glen Park, Corona Heights, Eureka Valley, Dolores Heights, Mission Dolores, Duboce Triangle, Buena Vista Park, Cole Valley, Ashbury Heights, and part of Twin Peaks	Democratic
District 9		Jackie Fielder	Mission District, Bernal Heights, and the Portola	Democratic
District 10		Shamann Walton	Potrero Hill, Central Waterfront, Dogpatch, Bayview-Hunters Point, Bayview Heights, India Basin, Silver Terrace, Candlestick Point, Visitacion Valley, Little Hollywood, Sunnydale, and McLaren Park	Democratic
District 11		Chyanne Chen	Excelsior, Ingleside, Oceanview, Merced Heights, Ingleside Heights, Mission Terrace, Outer Mission, Cayuga, and Crocker Amazon	Democratic

== See also ==
- Members of the San Francisco Board of Supervisors
