= San Francisco's 5th supervisorial district =

Electoral district in San Francisco, California

San Francisco's 5th City Council district
Councilmember
Bilal Mahmood; D–Tenderloin
since January 8, 2025
- Registration: 65.52% Democratic; 5.53% Republican; 24.24% No party preference
- Demographics: 53.5% White; 12.6% Black; 10.6% Hispanic; 20.8% Asian; 2.5% Other
- Population (2020): 83,506
- Registered voters (2025): 32,526

San Francisco's 5th supervisorial district is a city and county electoral district in the city and county of San Francisco. One of eleven districts within the San Francisco Board of Supervisors, it is currently represented by Democrat Bilal Mahmood of the Tenderloin neighborhood.

Existing as a ward for the San Francisco Common Council from 1850 to 1856 and for the San Francisco Board of Supervisors from 1856 to 1898, the district was re-established in 1977 after voters approved Proposition T, which replaced the 11‑member at‑large system with 11 single‑member districts. Its first elected supervisor was Harvey Milk, the first openly gay man elected to public office in the United States. After Milk’s 1978 assassination, the district system was abolished in 1980 and the city returned to at‑large elections. The district was reinstated in 2000 and became a progressive stronghold, electing two Green Party supervisors and a Democratic Socialist supervisor, though it has also elected moderates.

== Characteristics ==
=== Demographics ===
In 2025, the district population was 83,506, with the voting population being 53.51% White Americans, 20.75% Asian Americans, 12.60% African Americans, 10.59% Latino Americans, and 0.87% Native Americans. The homeownership rate that year was 11.4%. From 2012 to 2016, according to the American Community Survey, the population was 84,030, with 35% family households and 65% non‑family households. The racial composition from 2012 to 2016 was 62% White Americans, 19% Asian Americans, 10% Black Americans, 9% Latino Americans, 0.4% Native Americans, 8% two or more races, and 0.1% Native Hawaiian/Pacific Islander.

=== Politics ===
Since its restoration in 2000, it has been considered a progressive stronghold, being called one of San Francisco's most progressive districts in the city by Mission Local. The political think tank SPUR identified this district, along with the 6th, 8th, and 9th districts, as among the city's most progressive, citing strong support for liberal and left‑wing candidates in the decade before 2000. The first elected supervisor in the 2000 election was Matt Gonzalez, who had switched to the Green Party, who would be succeeded by another Green politician, Ross Mirkarimi. The district also elected Democratic Socialist Dean Preston, the first democratic socialist to represent the district since Harry Britt in 1979. However, the district has also elected moderates, including London Breed in 2012, who later appointed Vallie Brown after becoming mayor, and Bilal Mahmood in 2024. During the 2024 election, the San Francisco Examiner called the district a "bellwether for the state of San Francisco politics" due to how much the politics of the city affected its voting.

== Composition ==
Under the 2022 redistricting, the district encompasses the neighborhoods of Haight-Ashbury, Lower Haight, Filmore District, Western Addition, North Panhandle, Japantown, Hayes Valley, Tenderloin, San Francisco, and Civic Center. The district lies entirely within California's 11th congressional district and 11th state senate district, and is split between the 19th and 17th state assembly districts.

=== History of district boundaries ===
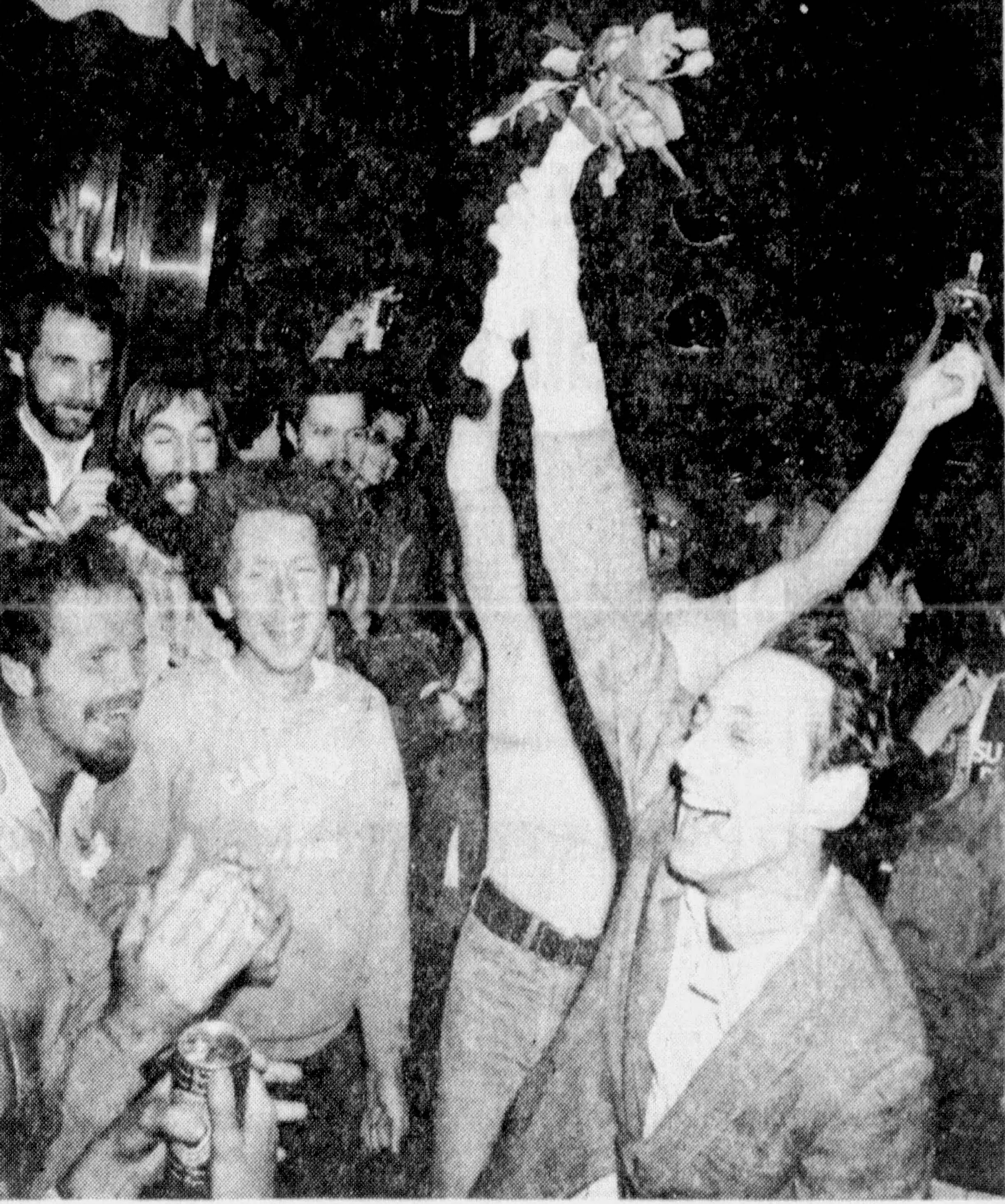
Harvey Milk celebrating his win in the newly-created 5th district, 1977.

Before San Francisco's consolidation as a city and county, it was represented by the San Francisco Common Council from May 6, 1850 to July 1, 1856. The city's 5th ward was within the present Financial District, bounded by Sacramento, Market, and Montgomery streets. After consolidation and the establishment of districts by the California State Legislature on July 1, 1856, the 5th ward was within the area bounded by Pine, Clay, and Kearny streets and the San Francisco Bay. In 1870, the ward was bounded by California, Kearny, and Market streets, with the ward having two precincts by 1880. The ward system was abolished on May 26, 1898, when the charter was revised to have the members be elected at-large.

In 1976, with the growth of the city's gay community and anti-war movement, voters approved Proposition T, which allowed the city's residents to elect their supervisors by district with 52.4% of the vote. The first election under the system was held in 1977 and resulted in the election of Harvey Milk, the first openly gay man elected to public office. The district encompassed Haight-Ashbury and Upper Market Street, areas with large gay populations. A year after his election, Milk was assassinated by former supervisor Dan White, with the impact contributing to the districts being abolished and the city returning to an at‑large election system.

In the mid-1990s, grassroots neighborhood effort to restore district elections led to return of the district system in 2000, with the district now representing the neighborhoods of Western Addition, Haight-Ashbury and Lower Pacific Heights. In 2011, some of the area north of Japantown was reassigned to the 1st and 2nd districts, after community advocates successfully kept Japantown intact rather than split between districts, leaving the general district boundaries largely unchanged.

In 2022, the San Francisco Redistricting Task Force approved a new map that produced the largest border change for the district, which comprised the Tenderloin, Japantown, Western Addition, and Haight-Ashbury while excluding Cole Valley and the Inner Sunset. According to the San Francisco Chronicle, the percentage of white voters fell by seven percentage points, while Black and Hispanic voter shares rose by 3.5 and 2 percentage points respectively, with Black and Hispanic voters together now composing 10% of the district electorate.

== List of members representing the district ==
Councilmember	Party	Dates	Electoral history
District established January 8, 1978
Harvey Milk (Castro District)	Democratic	January 8, 1978 – November 27, 1978	Elected in 1977. Assassinated.
Vacant		November 27, 1978 – January 9, 1979	
Harry Britt (Castro District)	Democratic	January 9, 1979 – January 8, 1981	Appointed to finish Milk's term. Elected in 1979. Redistricted to the at-large district.
District eliminated January 8, 1981
District re-established January 8, 2001
Matt Gonzalez (Lower Haight)	Green	January 8, 2001 – January 8, 2005	Elected in 2000. Retired.
Ross Mirkarimi (Lower Haight)	Green	January 8, 2005 – March 10, 2010	Elected in 2004. Re-elected in 2008. Resigned after election as Sheriff of San Francisco.
Ross Mirkarimi (Lower Haight)	Democratic	March 10, 2010 – January 7, 2012	Elected in 2004. Re-elected in 2008. Resigned after election as Sheriff of San Francisco.
Vacant		January 9, 2012 – January 8, 2013	
Christina Olague (North of Panhandle)	Democratic	January 9, 2012 – January 8, 2013	Appointed to finish Mirkarimi's term. Lost election.
London Breed (Lower Haight)	Democratic	January 8, 2013 – July 11, 2018	Elected in 2012. Re-elected in 2016. Resigned after election as Mayor of San Francisco.
Vacant		July 11, 2018 – July 16, 2018	
Vallie Brown (Lower Haight)	Democratic	July 16, 2018 – December 16, 2019	Appointed to finish Breed's term. Lost election for a full term.
Dean Preston (Alamo Square)	Democratic	December 16, 2019 – January 8, 2025	Elected to finish Breed's term. Re-elected in 2020. Lost re-election.
Bilal Mahmood (Tenderloin)	Democratic	January 8, 2025 – present	Elected in 2024.

== Electoral results ==
=== 2000 ===
District 5 supervisorial election, 2000
Candidate	Votes	%
Runoff election
Matt Gonzalez	10,384	65.36
Juanita Owens	5,503	34.64
Invalid or blank votes	36	0.23
Total votes	15,923	100.00

=== 2004 ===
District 5 supervisorial election, 2004
Candidate	Votes	%
Ranked choice voting — Pass 19
Ross Mirkarimi	13,211	50.60
Robert Haaland	7,272	27.85
Lisa Feldstein	5,628	21.55
Exhausted votes	13,144	33.48%
Total votes	39,255	100.00

=== 2008 ===
District 5 supervisorial election, 2008
Candidate	Votes	%
Ross Mirkarimi (incumbent)	27,482	77.39
Owen P. O'Connell	5,962	16.79
Rob Anderson	1,982	5.58
Write-in	87	0.24
Valid votes	37,408	86.85%
Invalid or blank votes	5,662	13.15
Total votes	43,070	100.00

=== 2012 ===
District 5 supervisorial election, 2012
Candidate	Votes	%
Ranked choice voting — Pass 5
London Breed	14,945	56.16
Christina Olague (incumbent)	11,668	43.84
Exhausted votes	13,640	33.89%
Total votes	40,253	100.00

=== 2016 ===
District 5 supervisorial election, 2016
Candidate	Votes	%
London Breed (incumbent)	21,318	51.91
Dean Preston	19,534	47.56
Write-in	218	0.53
Total votes	41,070	100.00

=== 2019 special ===
District 5 supervisorial special election, 2019
Candidate	Votes	%
Ranked choice voting — Pass 3
Dean Preston	11,723	50.40
Vallie Brown (incumbent)	11,538	49.60
Exhausted votes	406	6.24%
Total votes	23,261	100.00

=== 2020 ===
District 5 supervisorial election, 2020
Candidate	Votes	%
Ranked choice voting — Pass 3
Dean Preston (incumbent)	22,853	55.24
Vallie Brown	18,520	44.76
Exhausted votes	375	6.24%
Total votes	41,373	100.00

=== 2024 ===
District 5 supervisorial election, 2024
Candidate	Votes	%
Ranked choice voting — Pass 4
Bilal Mahmood	14,741	52.99
Dean Preston (incumbent)	13,077	47.01
Exhausted votes	1,851	6.24%
Total votes	27,818	100.00
