= 2004 San Francisco Board of Supervisors election =

- November 2, 2004

The 2004 San Francisco Board of Supervisors elections occurred on November 2, 2004. Seven of the eleven seats were contested in this election. Six incumbents and one open seat were up for election.

Municipal elections in California are officially non-partisan, though most candidates in San Francisco do receive funding and support from various political parties. This is the first Board of Supervisors election in San Francisco to implement ranked-choice voting.

== Results ==
=== District 1 ===

This district consists of the Richmond District. Incumbent supervisor Jake McGoldrick ran for reelection.

District 1 supervisorial election, 2004
Candidate	Votes	%
Jake McGoldrick (incumbent)	11,791	41.09
Lillian Sing	8,959	31.22
Matt Tuchow	2,859	9.96
David Heller	2,003	6.98
Rose Tsai	1,581	5.51
Leanna Dawydiak	1,373	4.78
Jeffrey S. Freebairn	131	0.46
Valid votes	28,697	91.59%
Invalid or blank votes	2,636	8.41
Total votes	31,333	100.00
Turnout	{{{votes}}}	73.63%
Ranked choice voting — Pass 4
Jake McGoldrick (incumbent)	14,011	54.01
Lillian Sing	11,929	45.99
Eligible votes	25,940	84.44%
Exhausted votes	4,781	15.56%
Total votes	30,721	100.00

==== Ranked-choice vote distribution ====
Candidate	Pass 1	Pass 2	Pass 3	Pass 4
Jake McGoldrick	11,815	12,084	12,304	14,011
Lillian Sing	8,989	9,309	10,036	11,929
Matt Tuchow	2,864	3,159	3,417	
David Heller	2,012	2,297	2,531	
Rose Tsai	1,595	1,727		
Leanna Dawydiak	1,380			
Jeffrey S. Freebairn	132			
Eligible ballots	28,787	28,576	28,288	25,940
Exhausted ballots	1,934	2,145	2,433	4,781
Total	30,721	30,721	30,721	30,721

=== District 2 ===

District 2 consists of the Marina, Pacific Heights, the Presidio, part of Russian Hill, and Sea Cliff. Incumbent supervisor Michela Alioto-Pier was seeking her first election after being appointed by Mayor Gavin Newsom in the wake of his election as mayor.

District 2 supervisorial special election, 2004
Candidate	Votes	%
Michela Alioto-Pier (incumbent)	21,013	61.25
Steve Braccini	5,763	16.80
David Pascal	4,207	12.26
Roger E. Schulke	1,950	5.68
Jay R. Shah	1,375	4.01
Valid votes	34,308	83.82%
Invalid or blank votes	6,623	16.18
Total votes	40,931	100.00
Turnout	{{{votes}}}	82.24%

=== District 3 ===

District 3 consists of the northeastern corner of San Francisco, including Chinatown, the Financial District, Fisherman's Wharf, Nob Hill, North Beach, and Telegraph Hill. Incumbent supervisor Aaron Peskin was seeking reelection.

District 3 supervisorial election, 2004
Candidate	Votes	%
Aaron Peskin (incumbent)	16,120	62.55
Brian Murphy O'Flynn	5,763	16.80
Eugene Chi-Ching Wong	3,534	13.71
Sal Busalacchi	1,536	5.96
Valid votes	26,953	91.68%
Invalid or blank votes	2,446	8.32
Total votes	29,399	100.00
Turnout	{{{votes}}}	74.11%

=== District 5 ===

District 5 consists of the Fillmore, Haight-Ashbury, Hayes Valley, Japantown, UCSF, and the Western Addition. Incumbent supervisor Matt Gonzalez did not seek reelection.

District 5 supervisorial election, 2004
Candidate	Votes	%
Ross Mirkarimi	9,928	28.40
Robert Haaland	5,096	14.58
Lisa Feldstein	3,242	9.27
Nick Waugh	3,007	8.60
Andrew Sullivan	2,474	7.08
Bill Barnes	1,659	4.75
Jim Siegel	1,537	4.40
Dan Kalb	1,393	3.99
Susan C. King	971	2.78
Michael E. O'Connor	860	2.46
Brett Wheeler	825	2.36
Joseph Blue	792	2.27
Tys Sniffen	684	1.96
Phoenix Streets	654	1.87
Julian Davis	412	1.18
Emmett Gilman	390	1.12
Francis Somsel	365	1.04
Rob Anderson	332	0.95
Vivian Wilder	129	0.37
Patrick M. Ciocca	87	0.25
Phillip House	61	0.17
H. Brown	57	0.16
Valid votes	34,955	85.93%
Invalid or blank votes	5,724	14.07
Total votes	40,679	100.00
Turnout	{{{votes}}}	75.25%
Ranked choice voting — Pass 19
Ross Mirkarimi	13,211	50.60
Robert Haaland	7,272	27.85
Lisa Feldstein	5,628	21.55
Eligible votes	26,111	66.52%
Exhausted votes	13,144	33.48%
Total votes	39,255	100.00

==== Ranked-choice vote distribution ====
Candidate	Pass 1	Pass 2	Pass 3	Pass 4	Pass 5	Pass 6	Pass 7	Pass 8	Pass 9	Pass 10	Pass 11	Pass 12	Pass 13	Pass 14	Pass 15	Pass 16	Pass 17	Pass 18	Pass 19
Ross Mirkarimi	9,947	9,950	9,952	9,969	9,996	10,034	10,094	10,158	10,261	10,387	10,472	10,635	10,766	10,946	11,262	11,659	11,921	12,287	13,211
Robert Haaland	5,124	5,126	5,130	5,146	5,180	5,192	5,226	5,254	5,318	5,384	5,461	5,538	5,628	5,740	5,956	6,319	6,409	6,636	7,272
Lisa Feldstein	3,257	3,265	3,274	3,289	3,309	3,323	3,381	3,430	3,484	3,566	3,671	3,671	3,851	4,070	4,313	4,636	4,759	5,064	5,628
Nick Waugh	3,025	3,025	3,027	3,035	3,053	3,070	3,090	3,118	3,187	3,243	3,296	3,391	3,441	3,540	3,732	3,900	4,063	5,041	
Andrew Sullivan	2,477	2,478	2,479	2,494	2,501	2,550	2,570	2,580	2,639	2,663	2,716	2,771	2,831	2,870	2,982	3,068	3,601		
Jim Siegel	1,540	1,542	1,543	1,551	1,565	1,608	1,639	1,657	1,743	1,763	1,820	1,866	2,053	2,111	2,184	2,242			
Bill Barnes	1,664	1,670	1,671	1,680	1,690	1,709	1,719	1,731	1,751	1,804	1,871	1,945	1,977	2,018	2,142				
Dan Kalb	1,398	1,400	1,400	1,412	1,430	1,449	1,466	1,493	1,540	1,582	1,610	1,698	1,739	1,867					
Susan C. King	977	980	984	1,007	1,034	1,051	1,072	1,116	1,147	1,206	1,237	1,293	1,371						
Michael E. O'Connor	868	870	873	882	906	930	944	973	1,012	1,036	1,079	1,127							
Brett Wheeler	832	833	835	845	871	881	896	929	951	995	1,026								
Joseph Blue	802	805	807	814	819	842	851	860	876	908									
Phoenix Streets	657	658	660	673	699	714	731	752	771										
Tys Sniffen	686	687	688	692	707	719	730	746											
Julian Davis	418	422	429	443	462	467	481												
Emmett Gilman	393	394	398	405	407	423													
Francis Somsel	368	341	342	379	381														
Rob Anderson	336	341	342	346															
Vivian Wilder	130	134	135																
Patrick M. Ciocca	87	91	91																
Phillip House	62	62																	
H. Brown	57																		
Eligible ballots	35,109	35,101	35,088	35,062	35,010	34,962	34,890	34,797	34,680	34,537	34,259	34,029	33,657	33,162	32,571	31,824	30,753	29,028	26,111
Exhausted ballots	4,146	4,154	4,167	4,193	4,245	4,293	4,365	4,458	4,575	4,718	4,996	5,226	5,593	6,093	6,684	7,431	8,502	10,227	13,144
Total	39,255	39,255	39,255	39,255	39,255	39,255	39,255	39,255	39,255	39,255	39,255	39,255	39,255	39,255	39,255	39,255	39,255	39,255	39,255

=== District 7 ===

District 7 consists of City College, Forest Hill, Lake Merced, Mount Davidson, Parkmerced, San Francisco State University, St. Francis Wood, and Twin Peaks. Incumbent supervisor Sean Elsbernd was seeking his first election after he was appointed to the seat in the wake of his predecessor Tony Hall's resignation.

District 7 supervisorial election, 2004
Candidate	Votes	%
Sean Elsbernd (incumbent)	10,475	33.23
Christine Linnenbach	6,764	21.46
Isaac Wang	2,717	8.62
Gregory Corrales	2,550	8.09
Milton "Rennie" O'Brien	2,359	7.48
Vernon C. Grigg III	2,082	6.60
Shawn Reifsteck	1,103	3.50
Michael Patrick Mallen	968	3.07
Pat Lakey	760	2.41
Svetlana Kaff	541	1.72
Art Belenson	507	1.61
Sheela Kini	349	1.11
David Parker	348	1.10
Valid votes	31,523	87.82%
Invalid or blank votes	4,373	12.18
Total votes	35,896	100.00
Turnout	{{{votes}}}	79.68%
Ranked choice voting — Pass 11
Sean Elsbernd (incumbent)	13,834	56.87
Christine Linnenbach	10,491	43.13
Eligible votes	24,325	69.69%
Exhausted votes	10,580	30.31%
Total votes	34,905	100.00

==== Ranked-choice vote distribution ====
Candidate	Pass 1	Pass 2	Pass 3	Pass 4	Pass 5	Pass 6	Pass 7	Pass 8	Pass 9	Pass 10	Pass 11
Sean Elsbernd	10,505	10,547	10,568	10,667	10,740	10,884	11,018	11,189	11,827	12,446	13,834
Christine Linnenbach	6,784	6,817	6,865	6,962	7,078	7,231	7,452	7,782	8,490	9,160	10,491
Milton "Rennie" O'Brien	2,372	2,410	2,481	2,525	2,588	2,691	2,847	3,090	3,300	3,799	
Isaac Wang	2,728	2,757	2,785	2,813	2,868	2,926	3,007	3,110	3,263	3,533	
Gregory Corrales	2,560	2,589	2,618	2,658	2,721	2,767	2,878	2,946	3,110		
Vernon C. Grigg III	2,091	2,104	2,114	2,151	2,186	2,252	2,323	2,451			
Shawn Reifsteck	1,108	1,136	1,187	1,210	1,236	1,286	1,388				
Michael Patrick Mallen	975	1,004	1,017	1,040	1,066	1,110					
Pat Lakey	763	783	804	823	840						
Svetlana Kaff	546	573	592	605							
Art Belenson	510	517	528								
Sheela Kini	349	367									
David Parker	348										
Eligible ballots	31,639	31,604	31,559	31,454	31,323	31,147	30,913	30,577	29,990	28,938	24,325
Exhausted ballots	3,266	3,301	3,346	3,351	3,582	3,758	3,992	4,328	4,915	5,967	10,580
Total	34,905	34,905	34,905	34,905	34,905	34,905	34,905	34,905	34,905	34,905	34,905

=== District 9 ===

District 9 consists of Bernal Heights, the Inner Mission, and part of the Portola. Incumbent supervisor Tom Ammiano ran for reelection.

District 9 supervisorial election, 2004
Candidate	Votes	%
Tom Ammiano (incumbent)	12,547	50.73
Renee Saucedo	5,460	22.08
Miguel Bustos	4,318	17.46
Lucrecia Bermudez	1,018	4.12
Steve Zeltzer	798	3.23
James Boris Perez	575	2.32
Adam Cabot (write-in)	17	0.17
Valid votes	24,733	91.62%
Invalid or blank votes	2,262	8.38
Total votes	26,995	100.00
Turnout	{{{votes}}}	73.83%

=== District 11 ===

District 11 consists of the Excelsior District, Ingleside, Oceanview, and the Outer Mission. Incumbent supervisor Gerardo Sandoval ran for reelection.

District 11 supervisorial election, 2004
Candidate	Votes	%
Gerardo Sandoval (incumbent)	7,427	32.24
Myrna Lim	4,259	18.49
Jose Medina	2,852	12.38
Anita Grier	2,787	12.10
Rolanda A. Bonilla	2,279	9.89
Rebecca Reynolds Silverberg	1,810	7.86
Tom Yuen	1,318	5.72
Fil M. Silverio	307	1.33
Valid votes	23,039	90.43%
Invalid or blank votes	2,439	9.57
Total votes	25,478	100.00
Turnout	{{{votes}}}	69.40%
Ranked choice voting — Pass 6
Gerardo Sandoval (incumbent)	10,679	58.33
Myrna Lim	7,629	41.67
Eligible votes	18,307	73.52%
Exhausted votes	6,595	26.48%
Total votes	24,902	100.00

==== Ranked-choice vote distribution ====
Candidate	Pass 1	Pass 2	Pass 3	Pass 4	Pass 5	Pass 6
Gerardo Sandoval	7,477	7,637	7,919	8,553	9,256	10,679
Myrna Lim	4,280	4,884	5,248	5,719	6,760	7,629
Jose Medina	2,869	2,989	3,359	3,867	4,683	
Anita Grier	2,806	3,080	3,522	3,829		
Rolanda A. Bonilla	2,293	2,356	2,571			
Rebecca Reynolds Silverberg	1,816	1,946				
Tom Yuen	1,328					
Fil M. Silverio	307					
Eligible ballots	23,176	22,892	22,619	21,968	20,699	18,307
Exhausted ballots	1,726	2,010	2,283	2,934	4,203	6,595
Total	24,902	24,902	24,902	24,902	24,902	24,902
