= Dean Preston =

American politician (born 1969)

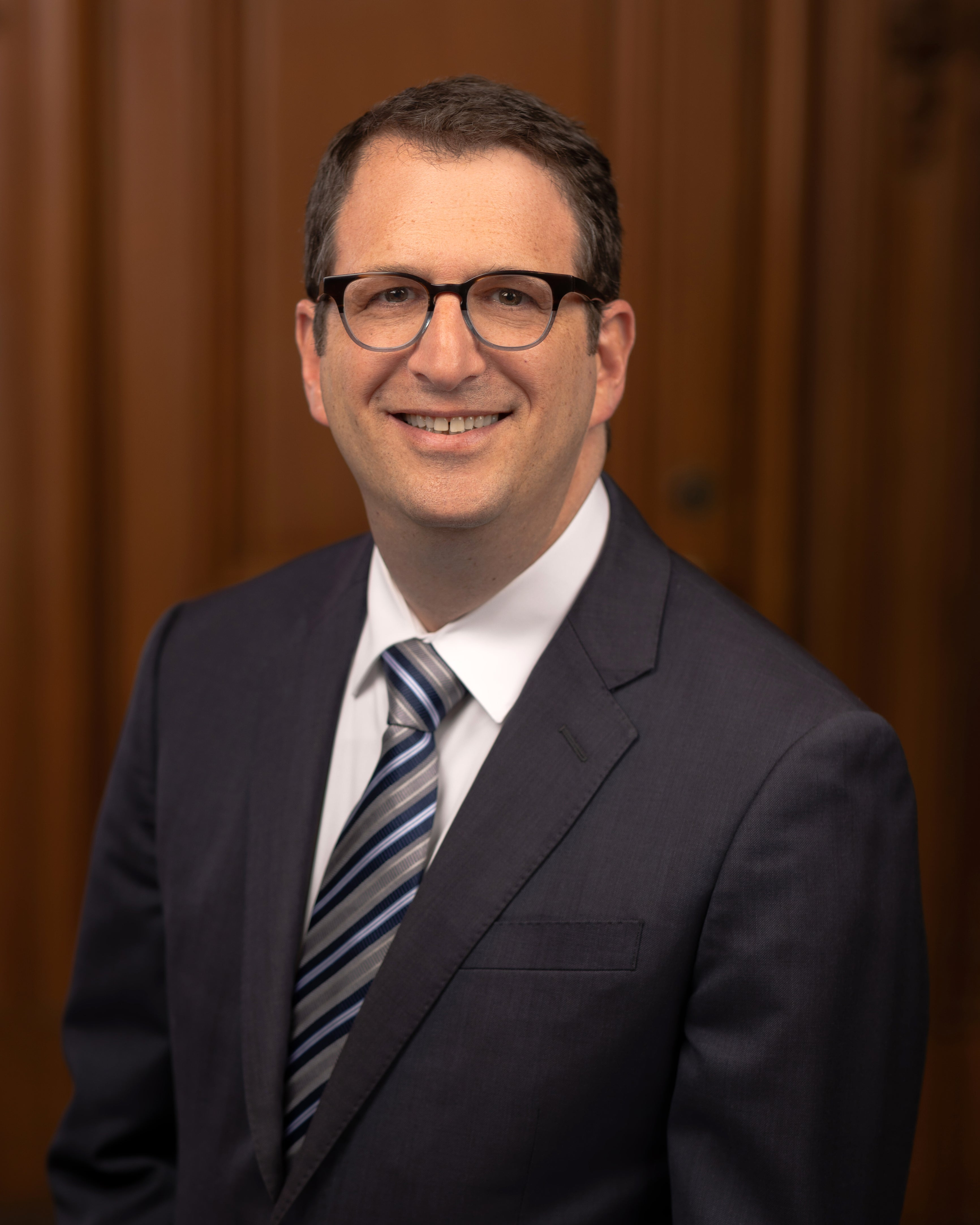
- Official portrait, 2023

Member of the San Francisco Board of Supervisors from the 5th district
- In office December 16, 2019 – January 8, 2025
- Preceded by: Vallie Brown
- Succeeded by: Bilal Mahmood

Personal details
- Born: 1969 (age 56–57) New York City, U.S.
- Party: Democratic
- Other political affiliations: Democratic Socialists of America
- Education: Bowdoin College; UC Hastings (J.D.)
- Occupation: Politician, attorney
- Website: Board of Supervisors District 5 website

Dean E. Preston (born 1969) is an American attorney and former member of the San Francisco Board of Supervisors. In November 2019, Preston won a special election to finish Mayor London Breed's term on the Board of Supervisors. He was re-elected in 2020 but lost to Bilal Mahmood in 2024.

Born and having grown up in New York City, Preston graduated from Bowdoin College with a degree in anthropology and economics before moving to San Francisco. He graduated with a J.D. from UC Hastings College of the Law and was staff attorney for the Tenderloin Housing Clinic from 2000 to 2008, after which he founded and led Tenants Together, a tenant advocacy organization. Preston is a member of the Democratic Socialists of America.

== Early life and education ==
Preston was born in New York City to a Jewish family. His father and grandparents were refugees from Nazi Germany during World War II. His mother was a New Yorker. Their family owned a co-operative apartment in Greenwich Village. Preston attended Horace Mann School, a prestigious Ivy League preparatory, which he graduated from in 1987. Preston attended Bowdoin College, where he met his future wife, Jenckyn Goosby.

He graduated in 1991 with a major in anthropology and economics. After graduation, the couple moved to Jenckyn's native San Francisco in 1993, settling down near Alamo Square. Preston studied law at UC Hastings College of the Law, where he was classmates with Molly McKay. Preston studied international human rights law, completed an externship at the Hague, and interned for the California Rural Legal Assistance. He received his J.D. in 1996.

== Early career ==
After law school, Preston worked for the law firm of John Burris, an Oakland-based attorney representing victims in police brutality cases. Preston spent the late 1990s working at public interest firms and clerked for Judge D. Lowell Jensen at the U.S. District Court for the Northern District of California from 1997 to 1998. He joined the non-profit Tenderloin Housing Clinic in 2000 and transitioned to tenant rights law. As a staff attorney for THC, Preston represented tenants against evictions, particularly tenants facing eviction due to California’s Ellis Act, a law passed in 1985 which allows landlords to evict all tenants in a building and take the building out of the housing market.

Preston was a co-owner of the bar and nightclub Cafe du Nord in the Castro District of San Francisco.

In 2008, Preston founded Tenants Together, a coalition of more than 50 local tenant rights organizations in California. Preston served as Executive Director of the organization which advocated for state legislation and helped form local tenant unions to push for rent control and tenants rights laws in several cities in California.

== San Francisco Board of Supervisors ==
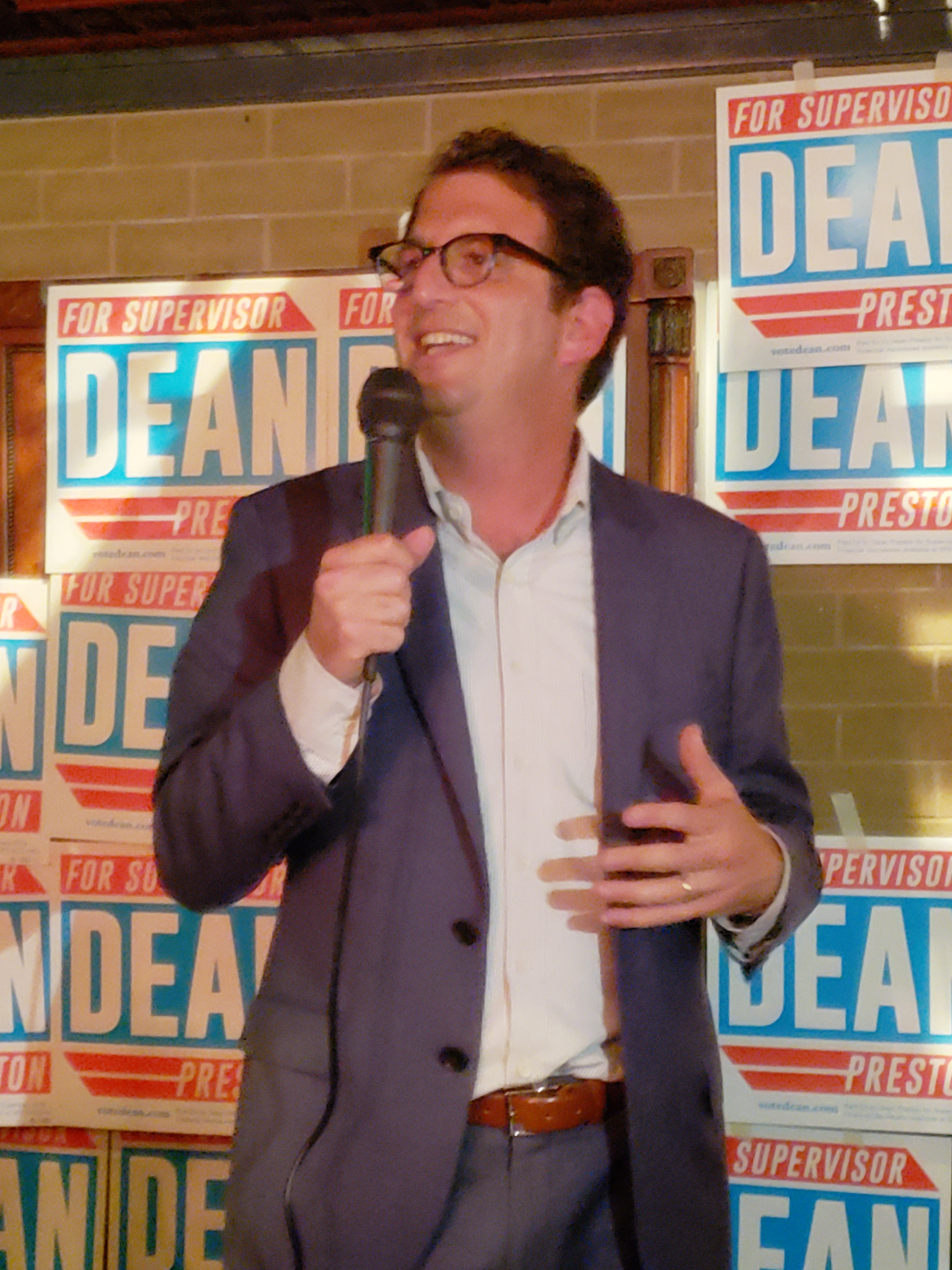
Preston at an election night campaign event in 2019

=== Elections ===
Preston ran against incumbent London Breed in the 2016 Board of Supervisors election for District 5 but lost 48% to 52%.

In July 2018, Preston, a member of the San Francisco chapter of the Democratic Socialists of America (DSA), became a candidate for the 2019 District 5 Supervisor election, to fill the vacancy left when Breed became mayor. Shortly after, Breed appointed Vallie Brown to the fill the position, and Brown ran as an incumbent. Preston ran as a democratic socialist and won the election by a narrow margin, becoming the first democratic socialist elected to the board since Harry Britt stepped down in 1993. Preston was sworn in on December 16, 2019.

Preston ran as an incumbent in the November 2020 election, with Brown campaigning for her former seat. He won against Brown 55% to 45%.

In his November 2024 election for a second full term, Preston received a plurality of first-round votes but was defeated by moderate opponent Bilal Mahmood in ranked-choice voting.

=== Tenure ===
==== Tenant rights and eviction protection ====
Preston authored San Francisco's 2018 Proposition F, which directs the city to establish a universal right to counsel for tenants facing eviction. The proposition was approved in June 2018 by a vote of 55%. After joining the Board of Supervisors, Preston continued to advocate for the program that provides legal representation to tenants in eviction court for the duration of their cases. By August 2020, the program was already underfunded by $4 million when the Mayor Breed announced an additional $1 million cut to the program in her proposed budget. Preston and other supervisors rejected the budget cuts and instead approved a $750,000 increase.

In April 2020, Preston introduced an ordinance to permanently bar eviction of tenants for failure to pay rent because of issues related to the COVID-19 pandemic. The measure, which passed the Board of Supervisors in June 2020 by a vote of 10 to 1, not only barred evictions but also prohibited fees, penalties, interest and other charges incurred due to the pandemic. A group of associations representing landlords in San Francisco filed a lawsuit in the San Francisco Superior Court challenging the ordinance but the court upheld the eviction prohibition in August 2020.

Preston again introduced legislation to extend eviction protections in May 2021 as the state-wide eviction moratorium in effect at the time was due to expire. The Board of Supervisors passed Preston's eviction protection legislation in June 2021 to extend the moratorium until the end of 2021, but the state legislature a week later passed its own extension to September 2021, cutting short San Francisco's local measure by three months. In September 2021, the Board unanimously adopted emergency legislation introduced by Preston to temporarily bar "no-fault evictions due to owner move-ins, condo conversions, breach of contract, capital improvements, renovations and demolition of a unit".

In October 2021, Preston started a tenant outreach campaign promoting his district as an “eviction-free zone", including programs to educate residents about ways to avoid eviction and obtain rental assistance. In December 2021, he proposed an ordinance to require landlords to give a 10-day advance notice to tenants before filing for eviction. The Board of Supervisors unanimously passed the measure in January 2022. Preston led a successful effort in August 2022 to stop the eviction of several Black residents of the King-Marcus Garvey Apartments in Western Addition who were being evicted due to a technicality in the regulations.

==== Homelessness ====
In April 2020, Preston co-introduced legislation with Supervisors Matt Haney, Hillary Ronen and Shamann Walton to require Mayor Breed to secure 8,250 hotel rooms to house the homeless during the COVID-19 pandemic. Preston also raised the funds to rent 30 rooms at the Oasis Inn near City Hall to house homeless people. The following month, he supported the establishment of "safe sleeping sites", including one in his district at an empty lot in the Haight-Ashbury neighborhood. The site included a security guard and access to food and bathrooms.

In September 2021, Preston questioned the proposed acquisition of a tourist hotel in Japantown for use as permanent supportive housing. The acquisition, one of four proposed by Mayor Breed, was opposed by some residents of the Japantown neighborhood, and Preston who represents the neighborhood suggested two other tourist hotels in his district as alternatives. The owners of the Kimpton Buchanan Hotel backed out of the deal but the Board, including Preston, approved the purchase of the three other hotels in October 2021. The Board later also approved the purchase of one of the hotels that was partially occupied by long term tenants that was suggested by Preston in February 2022.

==== Positions on housing and zoning ====
The San Francisco Chronicle reports that Preston opposed development plans and legislative proposals that could have housed more than 28,000 people, including affordable housing for nearly 8,500 people, from December 2019 to November 2021.

Preston has argued, "San Francisco is a shining example of the complete and utter failure of the free market to address housing needs." He has blamed homelessness in San Francisco on "unbridled capitalism." He has criticized YIMBYism as "a new face on private market developers' interests." In 2019, Preston opposed California Senate Bill 50, which would have eased housing construction near public transit, arguing that it was a "developer bill." In 2019, Preston spoke against the construction of a 186-unit apartment complex because only 20% of the apartments were for affordable housing while Preston wanted 33%.

Preston is a proponent of rent control. In 2021, Preston blocked discussion of a proposal that would have required 50 signatures to invoke the California Environmental Quality Act to block housing projects, rather than just one person complaining. According to the San Francisco Chronicle, Preston appears "to be one of the supervisors most opposed to building market-rate housing".

In 2020, Preston delayed a major zoning plan which would have led to the construction of thousands of housing units to the Van Ness/Market Street area of San Francisco. He called for a "race and equity study" of the project.

Preston also introduced two ballot initiatives approved by voters in the November 2020 election. Proposition I raised the transfer tax rate for property sales valued over $10 million, intended to fund affordable housing. Proposition K authorizes the city of San Francisco to build or acquire up to 10,000 units of affordable housing. In March 2020, Preston successfully proposed in the Board of Supervisors to appropriate $10 million from the funds raised by Proposition I to fund rent relief and $10 million to fund additional affordable housing. The Board of Supervisors allocated an additional $32 million from the funds for rent relief in late June 2020. In November 2021, Preston led a successful proposal to allocate $64 million from Proposition I to fund the Small Sites Program, which subsidizes about half the cost to allow nonprofit organizations to purchase small apartment buildings with residents at risk of displacement. In June 2022, he fought to secure additional affordable housing funding including $40 million for land acquisition, $20 million for public housing repairs, $10 million for elevator repairs in hotels used to house homeless residents, and $12 million for teacher housing.

In a committee meeting on the shared spaces program established by the city during the COVID-19 pandemic, Preston supported a two-week delay on voting to make the outdoor dining spaces permanent. His questions on an indefinite extension centered on public access and accessibility.

In March 2021, Preston called for a hearing on housing vacancies, arguing that the focus on building new housing had led to ignoring "the single biggest source of potential housing in San Francisco." In 2022, Preston proposed a ballot measure to tax vacant housing in San Francisco. The tax would apply to owners of buildings with three or more units when at least one of them has been unoccupied for more than six months in one year. The tax exempted vacant single-family homes and two-unit buildings. Revenue from the measure is earmarked for rental subsidies for low-income seniors and acquiring vacant properties for affordable housing. The measure passed with 54% of the votes.

In October 2021, Preston voted against the construction of a 495-unit apartment complex (one-quarter of which were designated as affordable housing) on a parking lot next to a BART station. Preston alleged that the construction of the apartment complex on the parking lot was "gentrification".

==== Public bank ====
In January 2021, Preston introduced an ordinance, co-sponsored by five other supervisors, to start the process of establishing a public bank in San Francisco after the 2019 passage of California's Public Banking Act. Preston’s legislation creates a working group to generate a business and governance plan for a public bank to be presented to the Board of Supervisors. The Board of Supervisors unanimously approved the ordinance in June 2021 and the working group convened for its first meeting in April 2022.

==== Public transit and transportation ====
A few months after taking office, Preston introduced a resolution opposing proposed fare increases by the San Francisco Municipal Transportation Agency (SFMTA). Preston's resolution introduced in February 2020 called on the SFMTA to avoid fare increases throughout the fiscal year 2021–2022 budget cycle. The Board of Supervisors approved the resolution in April 2020 and Preston also called on the San Francisco Attorney’s Office to investigate if the proposed fare increase violated California statute forbidding price increases more than 10 percent during a declaration of an emergency. The SFMTA board went ahead with the 12% fare increase a week after. In response, Preston and Supervisor Aaron Peskin proposed a charter amendment to strip the authority to increase fares from the SFMTA board. An agreement was reached in June 2020 in which the fare increases would be reversed and the charter amendment withdrawn.

In February 2021, he called for a study into the feasibility of a city-run bike-share program. In April 2021, Preston and Haney introduced a three-month pilot program for "Free Muni", free public transportation service funded by the city. The Board of Supervisors approved the measure on May 25, 2021. However, Mayor Breed vetoed the measure in late June before the pilot program could begin the following month. In December 2021, Preston also proposed a resolution which passed unanimously calling an end to street parking at about 1,000 of the city’s bus stops.

==== Public safety and policing ====
In July 2021, Preston was the sole dissenting vote against the city’s budget, citing increases in police spending and a lack of investment in social housing as the reasons for his vote. He again was the sole dissenting vote on the budget in July 2022, citing the $50 million increase to the police budget.

When the San Francisco Police Department (SFPD) requested approval from the Board of Supervisors to allow SFPD to use robots armed with explosives to kill suspects under certain circumstances, Preston was one of three supervisors that voted against the proposal in late November 2021. After significant backlash from residents, the Board reversed its decision a week later by unanimously approving an amended policy barring SFPD from using robots to kill.

==== Other issues and ballot measures ====
Preston introduced ballot measure Proposition H in May 2022 to shift local elections from odd-numbered to even-numbered years in an effort to increase voter participation. Twice as many voters participated in the 2020 presidential election compared to voters in the local elections for mayor, sheriff, treasurer, city attorney, and district attorney in 2019. While a similar bill was voted down in 2008, Proposition H passed with more than 70% of the votes.

== Personal life ==
Preston is married. He and his wife live in a single-family house in the Alamo Square neighborhood in San Francisco. The home was valued at $2.5 million in 2024, three times as much as Preston paid for it in 1999. The family trust of Preston's wife owns several buildings in San Francisco. Preston's brother, Alan, was previously married to current U.S. representative Pramila Jayapal.

He has been on the board of the Alamo Square Neighborhood Association. In the early 2000s, he worked to stop fast-food franchises such as Burger King and Domino's from moving into Alamo Square. Preston owns stock shares valued between $400,000 and $4 million in Apple, Microsoft, IBM and Cisco.

== See also ==
- List of Democratic Socialists of America members who have held office in the United States
