= Vallie =

Vallie is both a given name a surname. Notable people with the name include:

- Vallie Brown, American politician
- Vallie Eaves (1911–1960), American baseball player
- Isaac Vallie-Flagg (born 1978), American mixed martial artist
- Yaseen Vallie (born 1989), South African cricketer
