= Annemarie Conroy =

American attorney and former politician

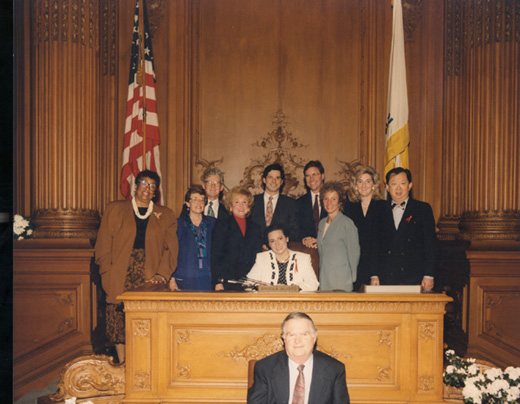
San Francisco Board of Supervisors inaugural photograph January 08, 1993. Conroy is standing second from right

Annemarie Conroy (born 1963 or 1964) is an American attorney and former member of the San Francisco Board of Supervisors (SF BoS). She is an Assistant United States Attorney in the United States District Court for the Northern District of California.

== Education ==
Conroy earned a BA in English at the University of California, Berkeley. She went on to earn her Juris Doctor from the University of California, Hastings College of the Law. She obtained an MA in security studies from the Naval Postgraduate School in Monterey, California.

== Career ==
Conroy was appointed to the SF BoS in 1992 by then Mayor Frank Jordan (who is Conroy's godfather) to fill the vacancy when Doris M. Ward resigned her seat to become San Francisco assessor-recorder. Conroy was the first Republican supervisor in ten years. She ran to retain her seat in the 1994 at-large election but lost to Mabel Teng. She was subsequently appointed as executive director of both the Treasure Island Development Authority and the city's Office of Emergency Services and Homeland Security.

In 2010 she joined the United States District Court for the Northern District of California as law enforcement coordinator.
