= Katy Tang =

American politician

Katy Tang 湯凱蒂
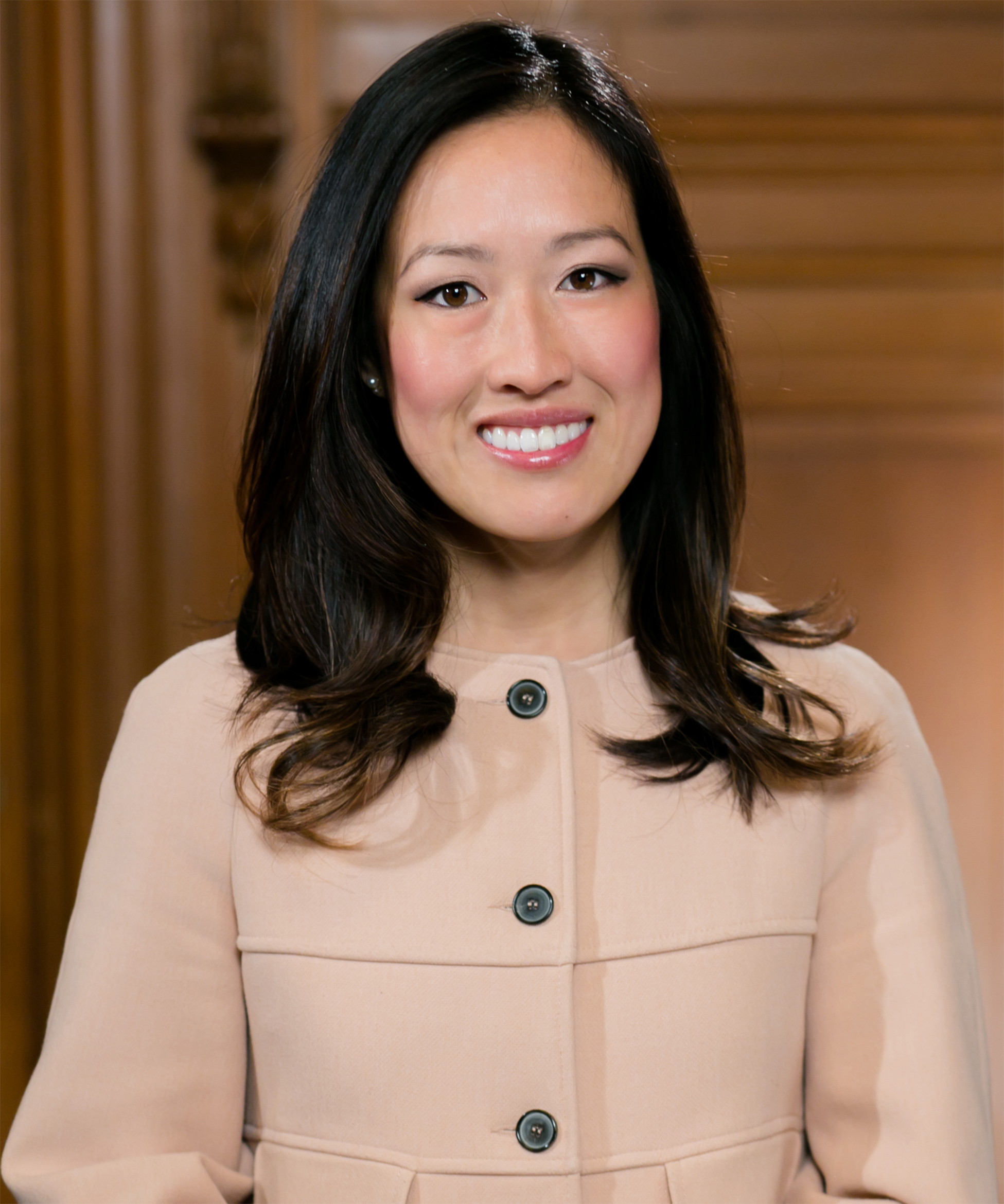
- Official portrait, 2015

Member of the San Francisco Board of Supervisors from the 4th district
- In office February 27, 2013 – January 8, 2019
- Mayor: London Breed
- Preceded by: Carmen Chu
- Succeeded by: Gordon Mar

President of the San Francisco Board of Supervisors
- In office December 1, 2014 – January 8, 2015
- Mayor: Ed Lee
- Preceded by: David Chiu
- Succeeded by: London Breed

Personal details
- Party: Democratic
- Education: University of California, Davis (BA, BA); University of San Francisco (JD)
- Occupation: Politician
- Website: Board of Supervisors District 4 website

Katy Tang (Chinese: 湯凱蒂; pinyin: Tāng Kǎidì) is a former American elected official in San Francisco, California. She served as a member of the San Francisco Board of Supervisors representing Supervisorial District 4.

District 4 includes the neighborhoods of Central Sunset, Outer Sunset, Parkside, Outer Parkside, and Pine Lake Park.

== Early life and education ==
She grew up in the Sunset District, attended Lowell High School, and graduated from University of California, Davis with a double B.A. in 3 years. She is also a graduate of the University of San Francisco School of Law.

== Electoral history ==
Tang was appointed to the Board of Supervisors in February 2013 and then elected in two subsequent elections in November 2013 and November 2014.

On November 18, 2014, the Board of Supervisors elected Tang to be the Interim President of the Board of Supervisors until the Board selected a President after the appointment of a new Supervisor for District 3 to replace outgoing Assembly member-elect David Chiu. She was succeeded by London Breed after an election on January 8, 2015.

== Legislation ==
· HOME-SF — Local version of the State Density Bonus Law, which provides incentives for creation of low and middle-income housing units citywide. Passed in 2017, with subsequent changes in 2018.

· Lactation in the Workplace / Family Friendly Ordinance — Strongest lactation in the workplace policy in the country when passed in 2017. Requires employers to have lactation policy, provide employees breaks & location for lactation, creation of lactation spaces in new buildings, and sets minimum standards for lactation accommodations. Led to creation and passage of SB 937, sponsored by State Senator Scott Wiener in 2018 for same standards to apply across the state.

· Zero Emission Vehicles — Mandated that half of city government light-duty vehicle fleet parked on city property to be zero emission vehicles by 2022. Also co-sponsored ordinance with Mayor Ed Lee to require new construction to install electric vehicle charging infrastructure.

· Food Service Waste Reduction — Legislation prohibits usage and sale of plastic straws in San Francisco, requires that food service ware accessories be provided only upon request or at self-service stations, and requires that large events with over 100 people on City property provide at least 10% reusable beverage cups.

· Accessory Dwelling Unit (ADU) Program Reform — Amendment to City's existing ADU program to make permitting process more streamlined and for residents to add more housing units in an affordable manner.

· Flexible Retail — Created new "Flexible Retail" use under the San Francisco Planning Code to allow for multi-use retail and co-location of businesses to better support local businesses and prevent vacancies. Flexible Retail is currently permitted within Supervisorial Districts 1, 4, 5, 10, and 11.

· Arts Funding — Initiative ordinance approved by voters at November 2018 election to ensure stable arts funding and investments citywide.

· Fur Sale Ban — San Francisco was the first major U.S. city to ban the sale of fur clothing and products. Fur items purchased online cannot even be delivered to a San Francisco address. Supervisor Katy Tang authored the measure.

· Exotic Animal Performance & Sale of Non-Rescue Cats & Dogs — Katy Tang successfully pushed to prohibit performances by exotic animals and to forbid the sale of non-rescue cats and dogs from pet stores.

== Political career ==
On Tuesday June 12, 2018 Katy Tang announced that she would not run for reelection for another term on the San Francisco Board of Supervisors and was succeeded by Gordon Mar.

== See also ==
- History of Chinese Americans in San Francisco
