= Sean Elsbernd =

American politician

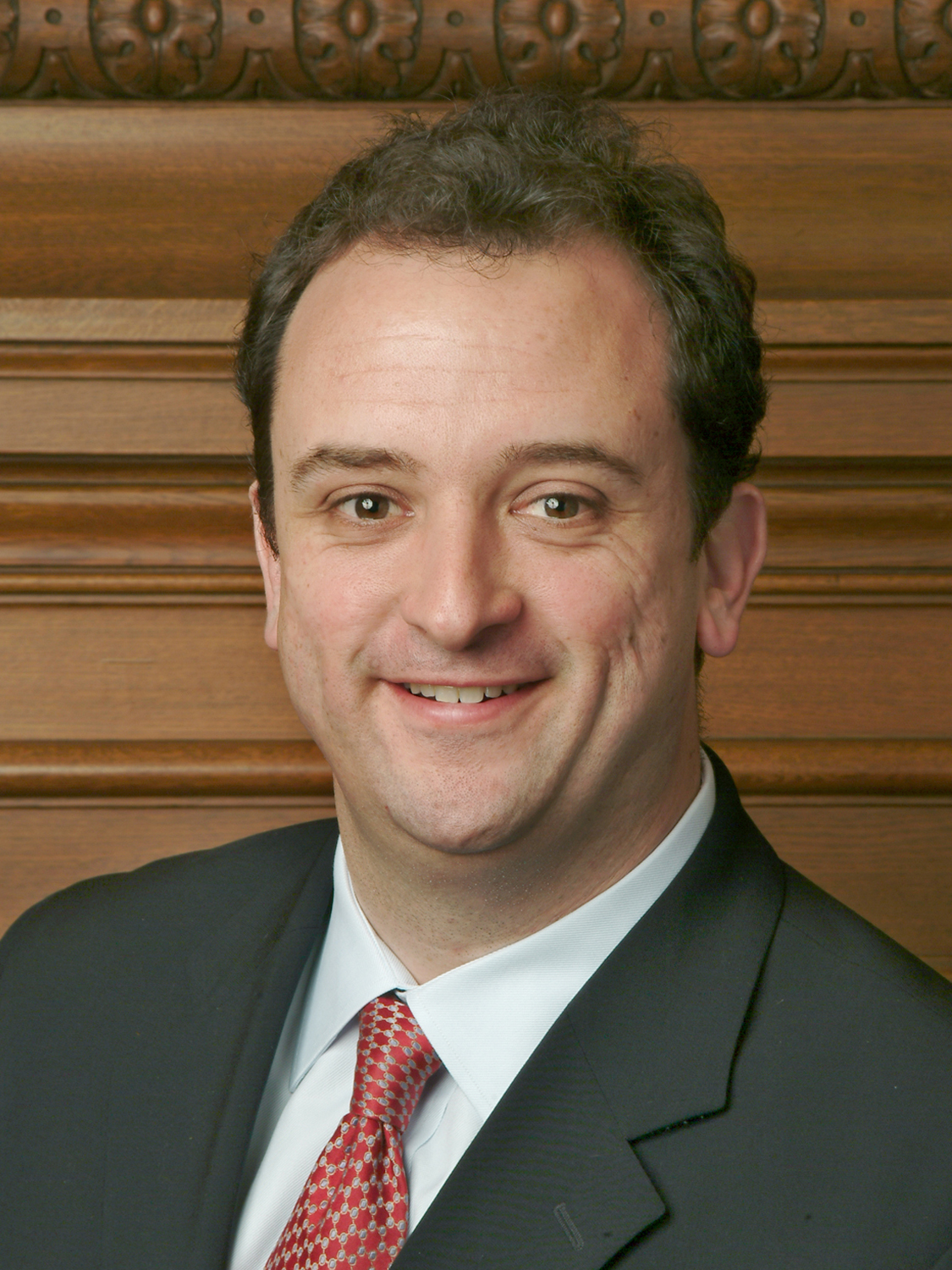
- Official portrait, 2010

Member of the San Francisco Board of Supervisors from District 7
- In office August 6, 2004 – January 8, 2013
- Preceded by: Tony Hall
- Succeeded by: Norman Yee

Personal details
- Born: February 7, 1976 (age 50) San Francisco, California
- Party: Democratic
- Spouse: Jennifer Johnston
- Education: Claremont McKenna College; University of California Hastings College of the Law
- Occupation: Politician
- Website: Supervisor Sean Elsbernd

Sean R. Elsbernd (born February 7, 1976) is an American politician who represented District 7 on the San Francisco Board of Supervisors. District 7 includes neighborhoods west of Twin Peaks, the Villas at Parkmerced, Lake Merced, Miraloma Park, Harding Park Golf Course, San Francisco State University, City College of San Francisco, and Laguna Honda Hospital and Rehabilitation Center.

== Early life ==
Elsbernd received his BA from Claremont McKenna College in 1997 and graduated from University of California Hastings College of the Law in 2000. He was subsequently admitted to the State Bar of California on December 4, 2000.

== Career ==
=== Early career ===
Prior to his work in City Hall, Elsbernd worked as a law clerk with Nielsen, Merksamer, Parinello, Mueller, & Naylor and with the San Francisco District Attorney's Office. He also worked in the office of Congressman Tom Lantos as a co-director of the Congressional Human Rights Caucus in 1995.

=== San Francisco Supervisor ===
Elsbernd was elected to the Board of Supervisors in November 2004, following his August 2004 appointment to the Board by Mayor Gavin Newsom.

In his final meeting on the board, his colleagues showered him with praise. Though referred to as a "curmudgeon" and to the right of most of his peers, "Elsbernd was renowned for his mastery of parliamentary procedure."

=== Mayoral chief of staff ===
San Francisco Mayor, London Breed, appointed Elsbernd as her chief of staff. He began his new role in the San Francisco's mayor's office in November 2018.

In his role, Elsbernd was involved in question whether Breed's decision to have appointees to commission submit unsigned and undated letters of resignation as an apparent condition to their appointment was appropriate. In a hearing in October 2022, Elsbernd was questioned by the San Francisco Board of Supervisors over his knowledge of the mayor's process for determining which appointees were required to submit such letters, and who was not.

=== SPUR ===
In 2025, Elsbernd became CEO of the civic think-tank SPUR.

== Personal life ==
He married Jennifer Johnston on November 11, 2005.
