= 2020 San Francisco Board of Supervisors election =

- November 3, 2020

The 2020 San Francisco Board of Supervisors elections were held on November 3, 2020, though many voted early by mail due to the COVID-19 pandemic in the United States. Six of the eleven seats on the San Francisco Board of Supervisors were contested. One incumbent was termed out of office, another incumbent chose to retire, and four ran for reelection. The election was conducted with ranked-choice voting.

== Results ==
=== District 1 ===
Incumbent Supervisor Sandra Lee Fewer was eligible to stand for reelection but decided against it, citing a desire to focus on personal matters.

District 1 supervisorial election, 2020
Candidate	First round votes	First round %	Final round votes	Final round %
Connie Chan	13,508	37.44%	17,142	50.18%
Marjan Philhour	12,383	34.32%	17,017	49.82%
David E. Lee	6,293	17.44%	N/A	
Sherman D'Silva	1,558	4.32%	N/A	
Veronica Shinzato	1,320	3.66%	N/A	
Amanda Inocencio	702	1.95%	N/A	
Andrew Majalya	312	0.86%	N/A	
Continuing vote total	36,076		34,159	

=== District 3 ===
Incumbent Supervisor Aaron Peskin was eligible for reelection.

District 3 supervisorial election, 2020
Candidate	First round votes	First round %	Final round votes	Final round %
Aaron Peskin (incumbent)	15,412	53.34%	16,199	56.51%
Danny Sauter	10,553	36.52%	12,468	43.49%
Spencer Simonsen	1,490	5.16%	N/A	
Stephen (Lulu) Schwartz	1,438	4.98%	N/A	
Continuing vote total	28,893		28,667	

=== District 5 ===
Incumbent Supervisor Dean Preston was eligible to run for reelection. The 2020 election was a rematch of the prior year's special election, with former Supervisor Vallie Brown aiming to win back her seat after narrowly losing by 0.8%.

District 5 supervisorial election, 2020
Candidate	First round votes	First round %	Final round votes	Final round %
Dean Preston (incumbent)	21,484	51.44%	22,853	55.24%
Vallie Brown	16,777	40.17%	18,520	44.76%
Daniel Landry	2,390	5.72%	N/A	
Nomvula O'Meara	1,113	2.66%	N/A	
Continuing vote total	41,764		41,373	

=== District 7 ===
Incumbent Supervisor Norman Yee was ineligible to run due to term limits.

District 7 supervisorial election, 2020
Candidate	First round votes	First round %	Final round votes	Final round %
Joel Engardio	9,272	23.57%	16,370	46.86%
Vilaska Nguyen	8,263	21.01%	N/A	
Myrna Melgar	7,881	20.04%	18,561	53.14%
Emily Murase	4,934	12.54%	N/A	
Stephen Martin-Pinto	4,599	11.69%	N/A	
Ben Matranga	3,414	8.68%	N/A	
Ken Piper	969	2.46%	N/A	
Continuing vote total	39,332		34,931	

=== District 9 ===
Incumbent Supervisor Hillary Ronen was eligible to run for reelection. She ran unopposed.

District 9 supervisorial election, 2020
Candidate	Final round votes	Final round %
Hillary Ronen (incumbent)	29,212	99.78%
Bud Ryerson (write-in)	63	0.22%
Continuing vote total	29,275	

=== District 11 ===
Incumbent Supervisor Ahsha Safaí was eligible for reelection. The race was notable as Safaí's primary opponent was former Supervisor and 2011 San Francisco mayoral candidate John Avalos. San Francisco law states that Supervisors may serve a maximum of two continuous terms, meaning Avalos, out of office since 2017, was eligible to run for another two terms.

District 11 supervisorial election, 2020
Candidate	First round votes	First round %	Final round votes	Final round %
Ahsha Safaí (incumbent)	15,135	48.28%	16,367	53.08%
John Avalos	13,412	42.78%	14,470	46.92%
Marcelo Colussi	2,788	8.89%	N/A	
Jason Chuyuan Zeng	15	0.05%	N/A	
Continuing vote total	31,350		30,837	
