= Doris M. Ward =

American politician (1932–2018)

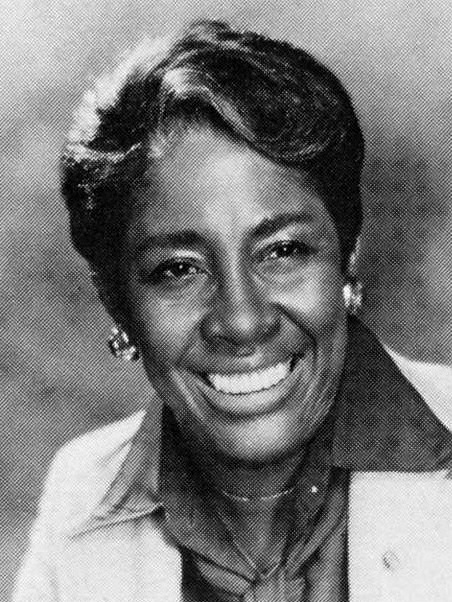
- Ward in 1983

Assessor-Recorder of San Francisco
- In office April 3, 1992 – January 8, 2003
- Preceded by: Richard Hongisto
- Succeeded by: Mabel Teng

President of the San Francisco Board of Supervisors
- In office January 8, 1990 – April 3, 1992
- Preceded by: Harry Britt
- Succeeded by: Kevin Shelley

Member of the San Francisco Board of Supervisors
- In office January 8, 1980 – April 3, 1992
- Preceded by: Robert Gonzales
- Succeeded by: Annemarie Conroy
- Constituency: 7th district (1980–1981); At-large district (1981–1992)

Personal details
- Born: January 27, 1932 Chicago, Illinois, U.S.
- Died: April 14, 2018 (aged 86) San Francisco, California, U.S.
- Party: Democratic
- Education: Indiana University Bloomington (BA, MA)

Doris Margaret Ward (January 27, 1932 – April 14, 2018) was an American politician. She was a member of the San Francisco Board of Supervisors and was the first African-American president of the board. After her term on the board, she was appointed as assessor-recorder for the county of San Francisco.

== Early life and education ==
Ward was born in Chicago, Illinois. Following the divorce of her parents, she was raised by her grandparents in Gary, Indiana. She studied at Indiana University Bloomington where she earned her bachelor's and master's degrees in education. During her college years, Ward was active the civil rights movement. She joined the NAACP and participated in sit-ins and protests against the Ku Klux Klan.

In 1968, she moved to San Francisco. Sources differ about her education in San Francisco. She may have earned a doctorate in education from San Francisco State University (SFSU), or a master's degree in counseling from SFSU and a doctorate (either PhD or Ed.D.) from University of California, Berkeley.

== Career ==
Ward's political career started in 1972 when she was elected as a member of the board of trustees for the San Francisco Community College. She then was elected to the San Francisco Board of Supervisors in 1979 and became president of the board in 1990. She was re-elected to the board four times. During her tenure on the board, she advocated for rent control, additional police oversight and divestiture from apartheid South Africa.

In 1987, Ward ran for United States House of Representatives in the seat of Caliornia's 5th congressional district that became open by the death of congresswoman Sala Burton. She was eliminated in the primary election by Nancy Pelosi, who went on to win the general election.

In 1992, she resigned from the board and was nominated as county assessor-recorder by Mayor Frank Jordan. She was re-elected twice, but lost the 2002 election after an FBI probe into allegations that she had awarded a no-bid contract to a political consultant who then produced a newsletter favorable to Ward's re-election bid. Ward was never charged with any crimes.
