= 1987 California's 5th congressional district special election =

- April 7, 1987 (primary); June 2, 1987 (runoff)

California's 5th congressional district
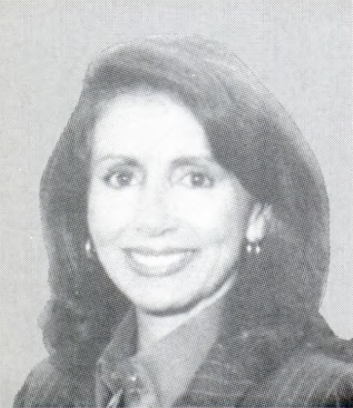

Candidate	Nancy Pelosi	Harriet Ross
Party	Democratic	Republican
Popular vote	46,428	22,478
Percentage	63.36%	30.68%
U.S. Representative before election
Sala Burton
Democratic
Elected U.S. Representative
Nancy Pelosi
Democratic

A special primary election to determine the member of the United States House of Representatives for California's 5th congressional district was held on April 7, 1987, with a special general election held two months later on June 2.

Incumbent Representative Sala Burton, who herself was elected during a special election following the death of her husband Phillip Burton, the previous incumbent, died on February 1, 1987, from colon cancer. Her death triggered a special election, leading to multiple people running to finish her term. No candidate received 50% in the primary, leading to a special general election won by former California Democratic Party chair and future Speaker of the House Nancy Pelosi.

== Candidates ==
Fourteen candidates ran in the special primary.

=== Democratic Party ===
- Nancy Pelosi, former chairwoman of the California Democratic Party and daughter of former Baltimore mayor Thomas D'Alesandro Jr.
- Harry Britt, LGBT rights advocate and former member of the San Francisco Board of Supervisors
- William Maher, San Francisco Board of Supervisors member
- Doris M. Ward, San Francisco Board of Supervisors member
- Carol Ruth Silver, gun rights advocate and San Francisco Board of Supervisors member
- Brian Lantz

=== Republican Party ===
- Harriet Ross
- Kevin W. Wadsworth
- Tom Spinosa, World War II and Vietnam War veteran and San Francisco County Republican Party official
- Mike Garza

=== Libertarian Party ===
- Sam Grove

=== Peace and Freedom Party ===
- Theodore Zuur

=== Independents ===
- Karen Edwards
- Catherine Renee Sedwick

== Special primary ==
Primary results by neighborhood. Pelosi: Pelosi—40–50%; Pelosi—30–40%; Britt: Britt—60–70%; Britt—50–60%; Britt—40–50%; Britt—30–40%

The nonpartisan blanket primary was held on April 7, 1987. A candidate winning 50% of the vote would automatically fill the vacant seat. If no candidate won 50%, a special general election (essentially a runoff) would be triggered with the top candidates in each party advancing to it.

1987 California's 5th congressional district special election
Party	Candidate	Votes	%
Democratic	Nancy Pelosi	38,927	36.12
Democratic	Harry Britt	35,008	32.48
Democratic	William Maher	15,355	14.25
Democratic	Doris M. Ward	6,498	6.03
Republican	Harriet Ross	3,016	2.8
Democratic	Carol Ruth Silver	2,896	2.69
Republican	Kevin W. Wadsworth	1,755	1.63
Republican	Tom Spinosa	1,712	1.59
Republican	Mike Garza	1,262	1.17
Independent	Karen Edwards	447	0.42
Libertarian	Sam Grove	408	0.38
Peace and Freedom	Theodore Zurr	187	0.17
Independent	Catherine Renee Sedwick	164	0.15
Democratic	Brian Lantz	141	0.13
Total votes		107,776	100.0

== Special general election ==
The special general election took place on June 2, 1987, with Nancy Pelosi gaining a majority of the vote and winning Sala Burton's seat.

1987 California's 5th congressional district special general election
Party	Candidate	Votes	%	±%
Democratic	Nancy Pelosi	46,428	63.36	
Republican	Harriet Ross	22,478	30.68	
Independent	Karen Edwards	1,602	2.19	
Peace and Freedom	Theodore Zurr	1,105	1.51	
Libertarian	Sam Grove	1,007	1.37	
Independent	Catherine Renee Sedwick	659	0.9	
Total votes		73,279	100.0	
Democratic hold				
