= San Francisco Common Council =

The San Francisco Common Council was the predecessor of the San Francisco Board of Supervisors. The common council was made up of the Board of Aldermen and the Board of Assistant Aldermen, each composed of one member elected from each of the city's eight wards. The first elections to these posts took place on May 1, 1850 (the same day as the vote on the city charter), and the common council took office on May 6, 1850.

The seventh and last common council served until July 1856, when under the Consolidation Act that unified city and county government in San Francisco, the common council was replaced by the first board of supervisors.
