= Harry Britt =

San Francisco legislator (1938–2020)

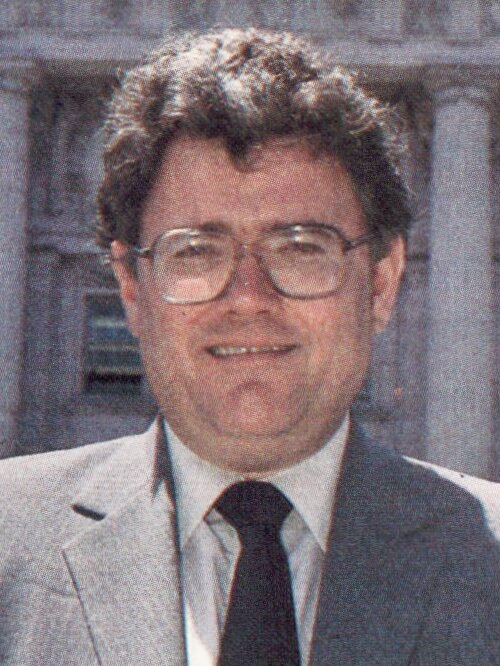
- Britt in 1985

President of the San Francisco Board of Supervisors
- In office 1989–1990
- Preceded by: Nancy G. Walker
- Succeeded by: Doris M. Ward

Member of the San Francisco Board of Supervisors
- In office January 9, 1979 – January 8, 1993
- Preceded by: Harvey Milk
- Succeeded by: Sue Bierman
- Constituency: 5th district (1979–1981); At-large district (1981–1993)

Personal details
- Born: June 8, 1938 Port Arthur, Texas, U.S.
- Died: June 24, 2020 (aged 82) San Francisco, California, U.S.
- Party: Democratic
- Other political affiliations: Democratic Socialists of America
- Education: Duke University; Southern Methodist University; University of Chicago

Harry Britt (June 8, 1938 – June 24, 2020) was an American politician and gay rights activist. Born in Texas, he worked as a Methodist pastor in Chicago as a young man and later moved to San Francisco. There, he worked with Harvey Milk until Milk's assassination in 1978. He was appointed to Milk's former seat on the San Francisco Board of Supervisors, where he remained until 1993, and served as the board's president from 1989 to 1990. Britt was a Democrat and member of the Democratic Socialists of America. He ran for the United States House of Representatives in 1987 and for the California State Assembly in 2002, but was unsuccessful both times.

== Background ==
Britt was a native of Port Arthur, Texas, and was educated at Duke University, Southern Methodist University, and the University of Chicago. He began his career as a Methodist minister in Chicago, and was married to a woman; though they had divorced by 1968, Britt said that he still did not realize that he was gay at the time. He first became involved in politics in Chicago, during the civil rights movement. By the mid-1970s, he had moved to San Francisco and began working with Harvey Milk.

== Career ==
=== San Francisco Board of Supervisors ===
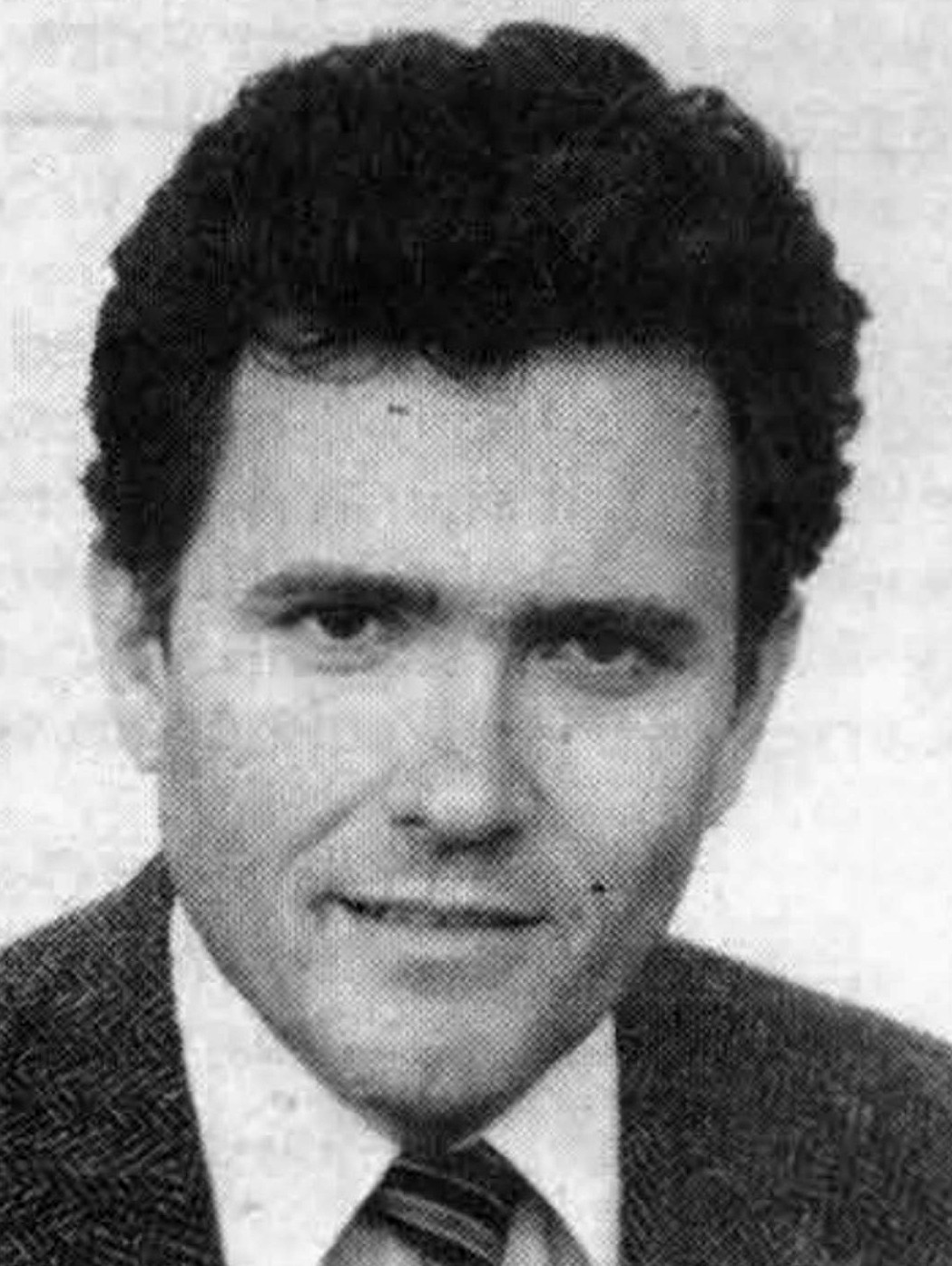
Britt c. 1980

Britt was first appointed to the San Francisco Board of Supervisors in January 1979 by Mayor Dianne Feinstein, succeeding Milk, who was assassinated in City Hall along with Mayor George Moscone by former Supervisor Dan White. He also served as President of the San Francisco Gay Democratic Club. Britt was elected and re-elected to the board in 1979, 1980, 1984, and 1988. and served as President of the Board of Supervisors from 1989 to 1990. Britt was one of a few early members of the Democratic Socialists of America to be elected to public office.

Britt, who was openly gay, introduced domestic partner legislation in 1982, which was passed by the Board of Supervisors but vetoed by Mayor Feinstein. In 1989, under Britt's leadership, the board again passed domestic partner legislation, which was this time signed by Mayor Art Agnos. However, voters narrowly repealed the domestic partnership law by initiative several months later. A modified version was reinstated by another voter initiative, 1990's Proposition K, also written by Britt.

=== Other campaigns ===
Britt chose not to run for reelection in 1992. He ran unsuccessfully for California's 5th congressional district in 1987, narrowly losing to Nancy Pelosi in a special election to fill the seat left vacant after the death of Sala Burton, winning 32 percent of the vote to Pelosi's 36 percent. He ran his campaign to Pelosi's left, expressing skepticism over her personal wealth and remarking, "I want to have the most progressive agenda in the Democratic Party – not one for socialites". He also was unsuccessful in his 2002 race against Mark Leno for a seat in the California State Assembly.

=== Later career ===
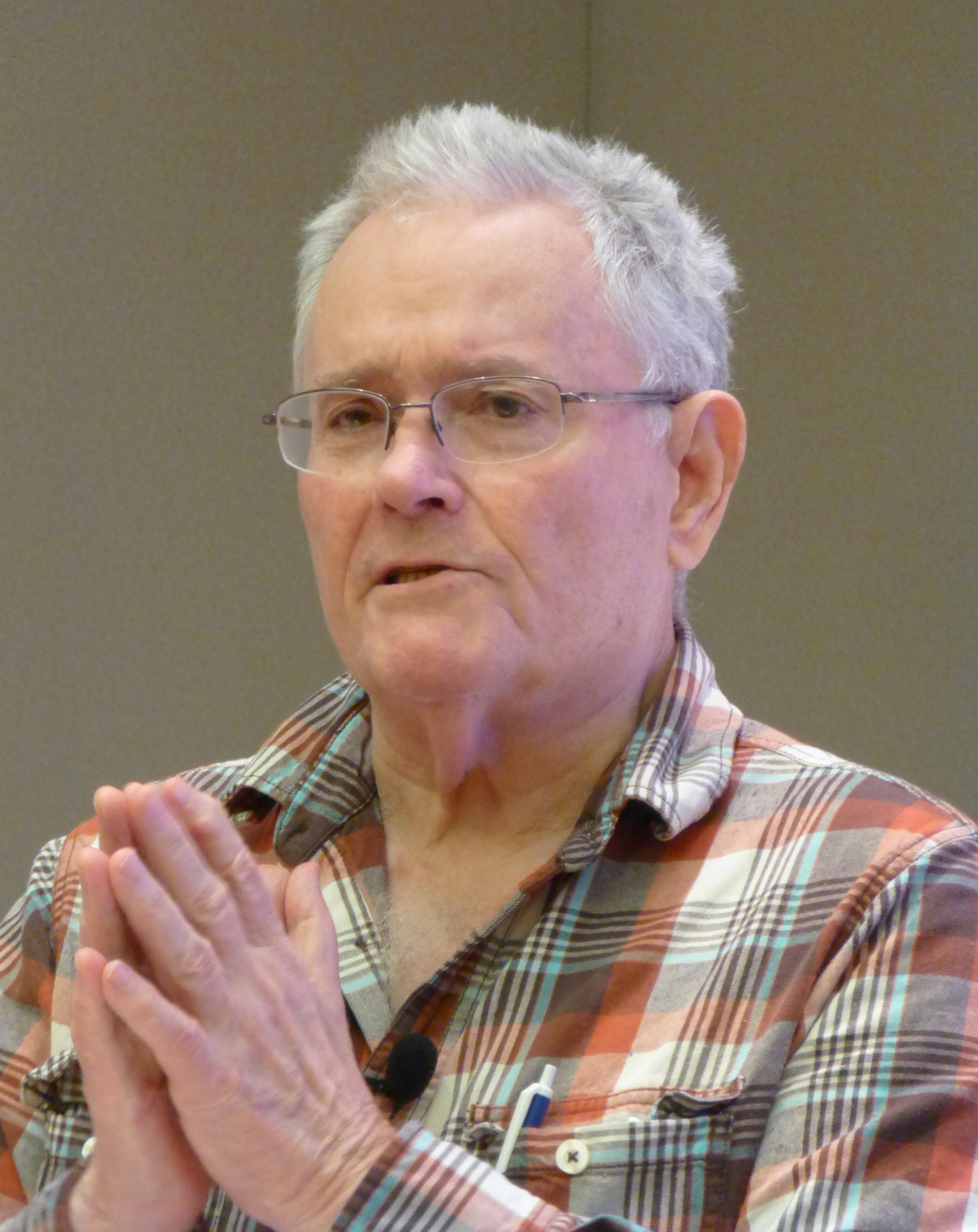
Britt gives a lecture at a meeting of the East Bay Atheists, March 16, 2014

Britt directed the Weekend BA Degree Completion Program at New College of California, which closed in January 2008 due to financial problems.

== Death ==
Britt's health declined in his later years due to diabetes. He died at Laguna Honda Hospital on June 24, 2020, at the age of 82.

== See also ==
- List of Democratic Socialists of America who have held office in the United States
