= Mabel Teng =

American politician

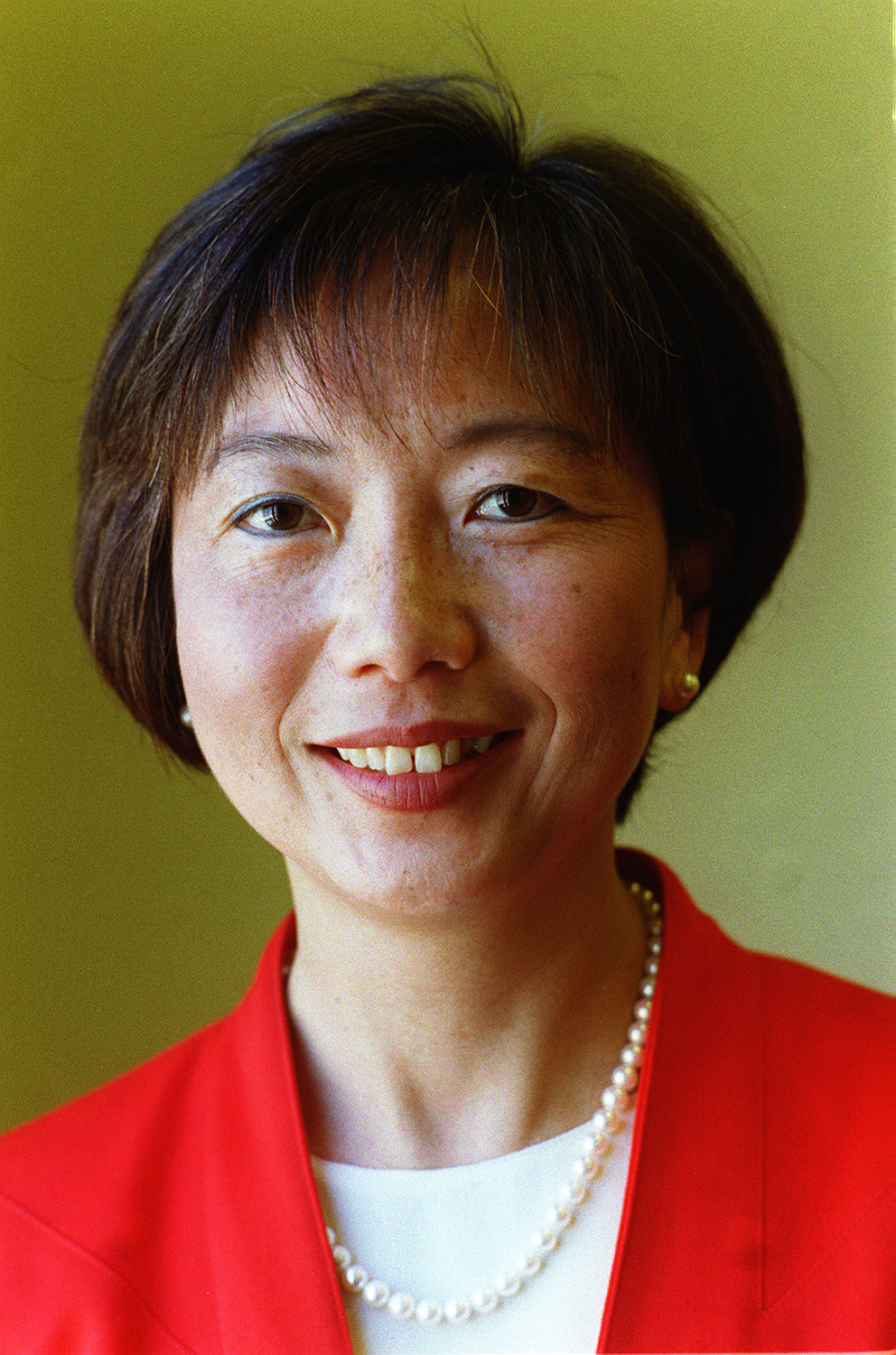
- Teng in 1999

Assessor-Recorder of San Francisco
- In office January 8, 2003 – May 15, 2005
- Preceded by: Doris M. Ward
- Succeeded by: Phil Ting

Member of the San Francisco Board of Supervisors
- In office 1994–2000
- Succeeded by: Tony Hall as member of District 7

Personal details
- Occupation: Executive director of Chinese Culture Center

Mabel Teng is a former American elected official. She is a former member of the San Francisco Board of Supervisors and a former assessor-recorder of San Francisco. She is also a former immigration rights community activist in Chinatown, San Francisco. She became the executive director of Chinatown's Chinese Culture Center in 2009.

== Early life ==
Teng grew up in Hong Kong. She attended high school in Ann Arbor, Michigan.

== Career ==
She began her political career as an activist with Jesse Jackson's Rainbow Coalition. She cofounded the Chinese Progressive Association in Boston and was later the co-chair of the San Francisco branch.

She was elected to the board of trustees of the San Francisco Community College District in 1990.

=== Supervisor ===
Teng was elected a member of the Board of Supervisors in 1994 and served for two terms. She was the first Chinese American elected to the board, without first having been appointed to the position.

In September 1996, Teng called for an 18-month moratorium on any new alcohol licenses within the Inner Sunset. This followed Supervisor Susan Leal's legislation prohibiting new alcohol licenses for non-restaurants in the Mission District in 1994 due to a high crime rate within the area. The Inner Sunset's crime rate at the time was 18% higher than the city's average.

On December 13, 1996, Teng and Supervisor Tom Ammiano protested sweatshop labor in Nicaragua and unpaid wages for garment workers in Los Angeles outside of the Macy's West store in Union Square, San Francisco alongside other activists, garment workers, and members of various labor organizations, including the San Francisco Labor Council and AFL-CIO. The protest was a part of a campaign by the Union of Needletrades, Industrial and Textile Employees held outside Federated Department Stores, Inc. and May Department Stores Co. stores across the United States.

In February 1997, Teng sought an 18-month moratorium on any "new bars, full-service restaurants, specialty grocers and retail coffee stores" in the West Portal commercial district, which encompasses the part of West Portal Avenue between Ulloa Street to 15th Avenue. This was in response to complaints from neighbors and store owners who tried to prevent the opening of a new Starbucks and wanted to keep intact the neighborhood's "village character".

In July 1998, Teng proposed renaming a portion of Myrtle Street after lesbian writer Alice B. Toklas. The name of an alleyway near City Hall was later changed to "Alice B. Toklas Place".

In the 2000 San Francisco Board of Supervisors election, Teng was defeated by Tony Hall by fewer than 50 votes in the run-off election. Teng won in neighborhoods with an Asian majority while Hall captured more votes in the city's Irish-Catholic enclaves.

=== Assessor-Recorder ===
Teng was the city's assessor-recorder from 2002 to 2005. She officiated the first same-sex marriage in San Francisco on Feb. 12, 2004.

During the early 2000s recession, Teng opposed the reassessment of commercial property values for major properties in San Francisco. She stated that it would increase pressure on residential property taxes and that a cut would not reflect the long term value of San Francisco property, citing an instance in 1995 wherein Fairmont San Francisco's valuation was reduced to $58 million from $82 million and was sold two years later for $100 million.

Teng was investigated for hiring/promoting 16 of her campaign contributors since taking office. She resigned in May 2005, citing personal reasons.

== Personal life ==
During her time as supervisor, Teng resided in West Portal, San Francisco.

Teng is divorced with two daughters.
