= Tony Hall (California politician) =

American elected official

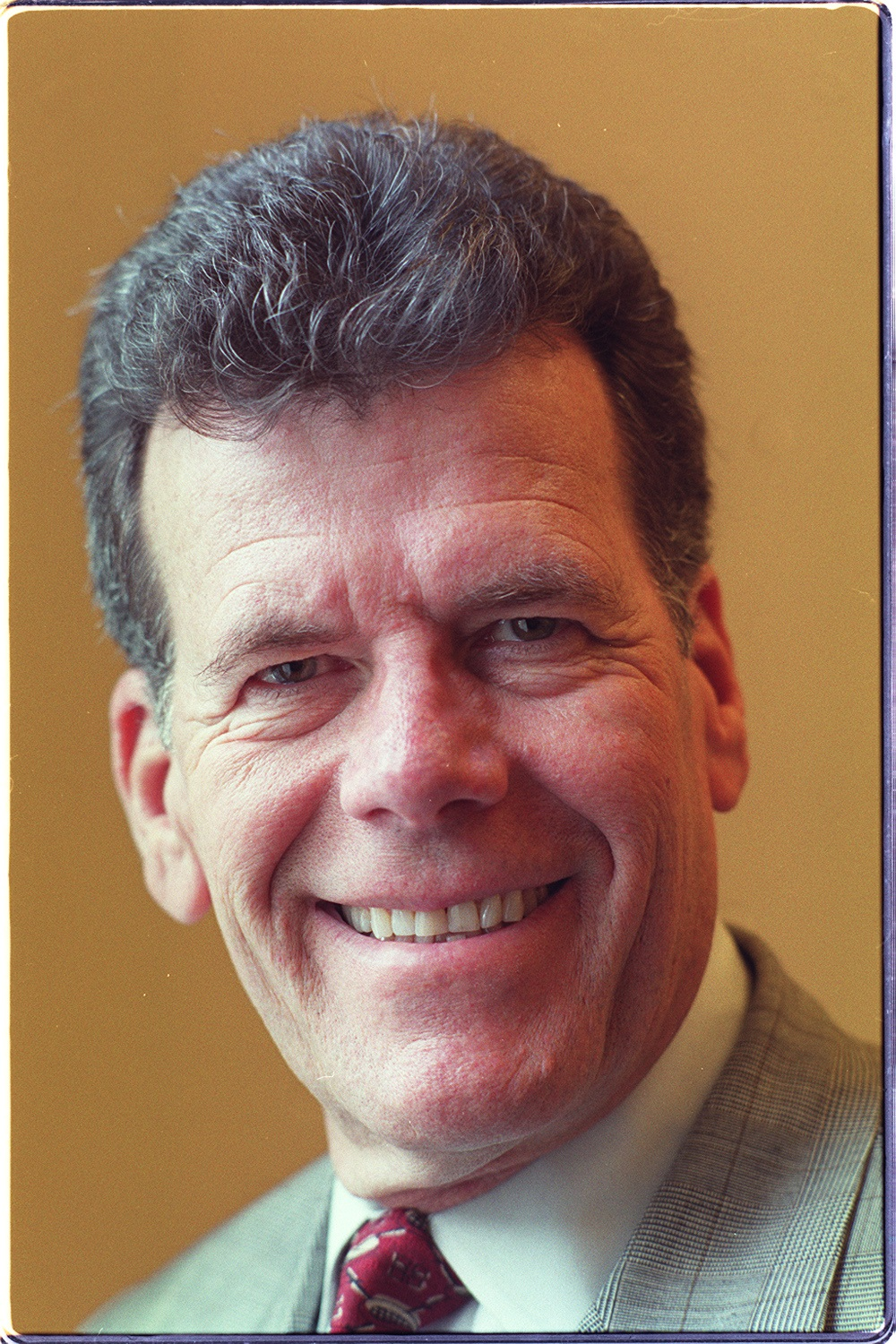

Member of the San Francisco Board of Supervisors from District 7
- In office 2000–2004
- Preceded by: Mabel Teng
- Succeeded by: Sean Elsbernd

Personal details
- Education: UCLA

Anthony Hall (born 1942) is a former American elected official. He was a member of the San Francisco Board of Supervisors from 2000 to 2004. He resigned in 2004 to accept appointment as executive director of the Treasure Island Development Authority, a post he held for only 14 months. Hall later filed papers for running against the incumbent Newsom in the 2007 mayoral election but dropped out before the election, citing Newsom's entrenchment. He was known as the lone conservative on the Board of Supervisors and surprised the other board members when he supported Matt Gonzalez's successful bid for president of the board.

== Early life ==
Born in Los Angeles, Hall attended Loyola High School and graduated from the University of California, Los Angeles with a degree in economics and public administration. He moved to San Francisco in 1964. His volunteer and civic activities have included singing Mass at St. Brendan's Church on Sundays, volunteering as a track coach at St. Ignatius Prep School, and announcing the San Francisco’s St. Patrick's Day Parade.

Hall and his band "The Hallmarks" perform at weddings and are a mainstay of the San Francisco music scene.

== Career ==
He is a former Executive Assistant to the Presiding Judge of the San Francisco Superior Court.

=== San Francisco Board of Supervisors ===
In 2000, Hall was elected to represent District 7 on the San Francisco Board of Supervisors.

The San Francisco Chronicle said of Hall at the time: "Hall's politics are old-school San Francisco, and he plans to keep it that way". The Chronicle described Hall as "focused on neighborhoods the same way that supervisors were in the late 1970s during the city's first attempt at district elections". He was praised unanimously in a resolution by his colleagues calling Hall "a dedicated legislator serving with integrity, intelligence, and a willingness to work with all parties for the common good of the City".

As a Supervisor, Hall:

- Led the restoration/renovation of the Harding Park Golf Course, resulting in the acquisition of annual PGA tournaments, which have provided the City with millions in revenue.
- Introduced and passed legislation for the re-build of Laguna Honda Home for the aged.
- Spearheaded the reconstruction of the Ocean Avenue commercial district.
- Led the renewal and reconstruction of the City’s Youth Guidance Center.
- Worked with state and local agencies and private entities to solve the Lake Merced water loss/level problem.
- Led the restoration and beautification of the City’s Great Highway and the adjoining Ocean Beach.
- Preserved and initiated maintenance for parks and open spaces, including the building of sports fields, and incorporated after-school recreational and educational programs for youth.
- Implemented programs within his district to calm traffic in conjunction with street beautification projects.
- Drafted the "Blueprint for Homeless Reform Policy", introduced in 2001, was the product of a 15-year personal study which encompassed a 7-point package of ordinances and resolutions which established quality of life and civility laws and mandated policy changes within the homeless industry. Hall directly questioned the efficacy of then-Supervisor Gavin Newsom’s "Care-Not-Cash" initiative.
- Implemented the Safely Surrendered Baby Law (Senate Bill 1368) for San Francisco and passed the Safe Haven for Newborns legislation.

=== Treasure Island Development Authority ===
Hall served on the Board of Supervisors until August 2004, when Mayor Gavin Newsom asked Hall to assume the post of Executive Director of the Treasure Island Development Authority. Mayor Newsom publicly stated that his choice was due to Hall's record of accomplishments in the area of public facilities and special projects. Newsom appointed Sean Elsbernd to replace Hall on the Board of Supervisors.

Hall conducted on-going meetings with the developer regarding plans and contract compliance issues, as well as parallel interaction with the United States Navy principals responsible for re-conveyance of the property to San Francisco. The Navy had become skeptical of San Francisco's sincerity and the ability of the developer to issue a concrete redevelopment plan after more than seven years. Newsom insisted upon a renewal of the developer's contract, despite the fact that the developer had not met its terms; there were substantial payment shortfalls for specific developmental milestones, and a series of discarded timetable extensions. Newsom also insisted that other "partners" be allowed to join the development team without going through the public bidding process as mandated by the City Charter.

In October 2005, the Treasure Island Development Authority voted to require the resignation of Tony Hall from the project "without cause". Hall subsequently warned of the dangers of development on Treasure Island, calling it a "seismically unsafe toxic landfill" on top of the San Andreas fault.

=== Investigation ===
In 2008, Hall was found guilty of campaign finance violations by the San Francisco Ethics Commission. Hall suggested that "the investigation against him was conspired by Mayor Gavin Newsom, Supervisor Sean Elsbernd and attorney Jim Sutton to prevent Hall from running against Newsom in 2007 and Elsbernd in 2008."

=== Other work ===
Since departing Treasure Island, Hall has maintained a blog on issues related to civic life in San Francisco, and is a columnist for the Westside Observer.

In 2007, Hall began a campaign for San Francisco mayor to challenge Newsom, but dropped out. In March 2011, Hall announced he was running for mayor a second time, but his bid was unsuccessful.

Political offices
Preceded by District Created	Member of the San Francisco Board of Supervisors; District 7; 2000–2004	Succeeded by Sean Elsbernd
