= London Breed =

Mayor of San Francisco from 2018 to 2025

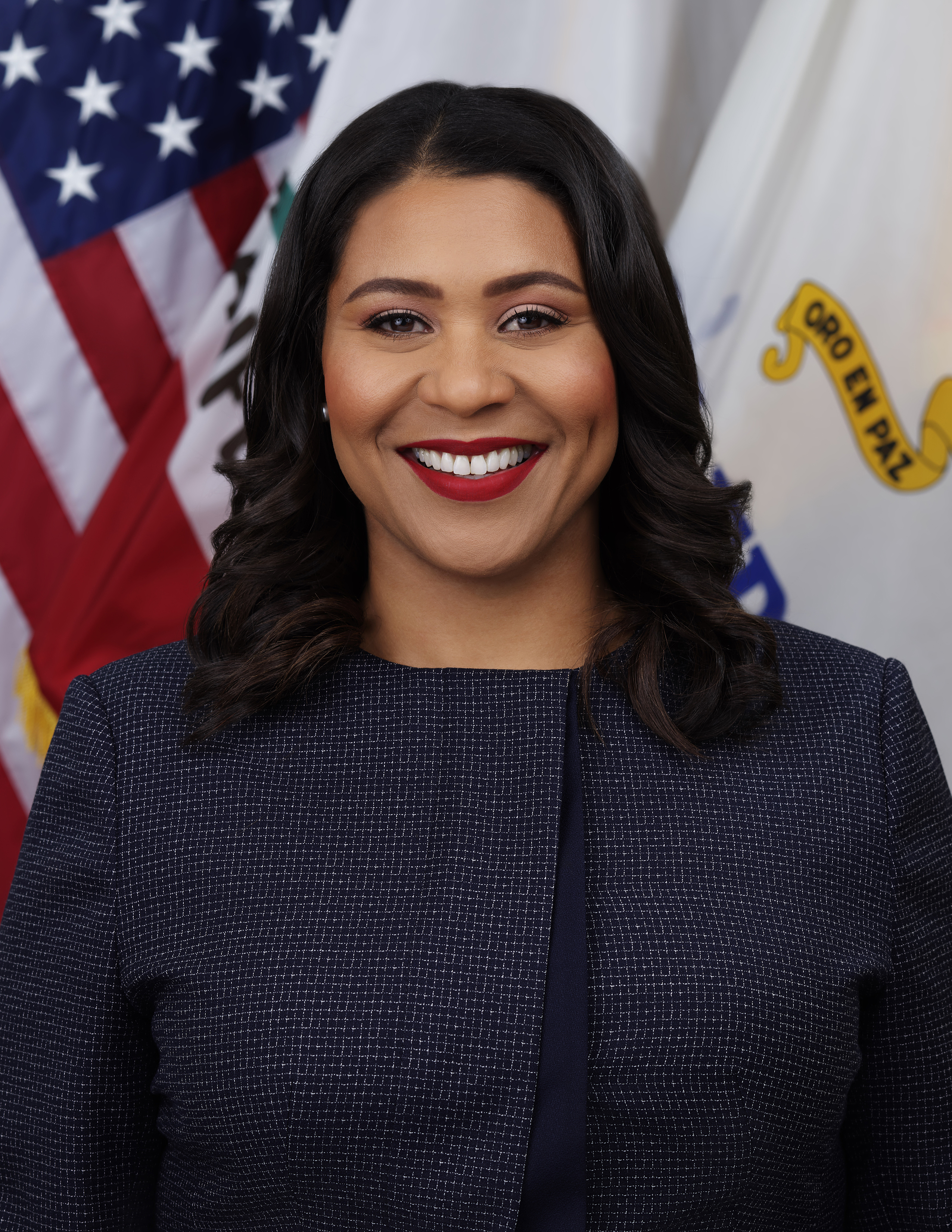
- Official portrait, 2019

45th Mayor of San Francisco
- In office July 11, 2018 – January 8, 2025
- Preceded by: Mark Farrell
- Succeeded by: Daniel Lurie
- In office December 12, 2017 – January 23, 2018; Acting
- Preceded by: Ed Lee
- Succeeded by: Mark Farrell

President of the San Francisco Board of Supervisors
- In office January 8, 2015 – June 26, 2018
- Preceded by: Katy Tang
- Succeeded by: Malia Cohen

Member of the San Francisco Board of Supervisors from the 5th district
- In office January 8, 2013 – July 11, 2018
- Preceded by: Christina Olague
- Succeeded by: Vallie Brown

Personal details
- Born: London Nicole Breed; August 11, 1974 (age 52) San Francisco, California, U.S.
- Party: Democratic
- Education: University of California, Davis (BA); University of San Francisco (MPA)

London Nicole Breed (born August 11, 1974) is an American politician who served as the 45th mayor of San Francisco from 2018 to 2025. She served on the San Francisco Board of Supervisors for District 5 from 2013 to 2018 and was the board's president from 2015 to 2018.

Raised in the Western Addition neighborhood of San Francisco, Breed worked in government after college. Before holding elected office, she served as executive director of the African American Art & Culture Complex. She was elected to the Board of Supervisors in 2012 (taking office in January 2013), and elected its president in 2015. As president of the Board, Breed, according to the city charter, became the acting mayor of San Francisco following the death of Mayor Ed Lee. She served in this role from December 12, 2017, to January 23, 2018.

Breed won the San Francisco mayoral special election held on June 5, 2018. Breed is the first black woman, second black person after Willie Brown, and second woman after Dianne Feinstein to be elected mayor of San Francisco. She was sworn in as mayor on July 11, 2018. She ran for re-election as mayor in 2024, but lost to Daniel Lurie.

== Early life and education ==
Born in San Francisco, Breed was raised by her grandmother in Plaza East public housing in the Western Addition neighborhood of the city. As a youth, Breed lived with three siblings (two brothers and a sister), along with an aunt who was facing mental health challenges. Breed later wrote of her childhood in San Francisco, "five of us living on $900 per month. 'Recycling' meant drinking out of old mayonnaise jars. Violence was never far away. And once a week, we took Grandma's pushcart to the community room to collect government-issued groceries." Her younger sister died of a drug overdose in 2006. Her brother, Napoleon Brown, is in prison serving a 44-year sentence for a 2000 conviction on charges of manslaughter and armed robbery, for which Breed has repeatedly asked for clemency from the governor's office. Breed has stated that her brother's early release from prison would be "what's best for both Napoleon and society overall".

At age 14, Breed worked as a paid intern at The Family School as part of the Mayor's Youth Employment and Training Program. She graduated with honors from Galileo High School where she played in the band and participated in school government. Although she entered college as a chemistry major, she earned a bachelor's degree in political science–public service from the University of California, Davis in 1997 and a master's degree in public administration from the University of San Francisco in 2012. While in college, Breed babysat and cleaned houses to help pay for expenses. After college graduation, she said that "I just didn't want to be poor," especially witnessing her grandmother's financial struggles.

== Early career ==
Breed worked as an intern in the Office of Housing and Neighborhood Services for Mayor Willie Brown. In 2002, she became the executive director of the African American Art & Culture Complex, where she raised over $2.5 million to renovate the complex's 34,000 square foot space, including an art gallery, theater space, and a recording studio. Breed was named to the San Francisco Redevelopment Agency Commission in 2004. In 2010, Mayor Gavin Newsom appointed her to the San Francisco Fire Commission.

== San Francisco Board of Supervisors ==
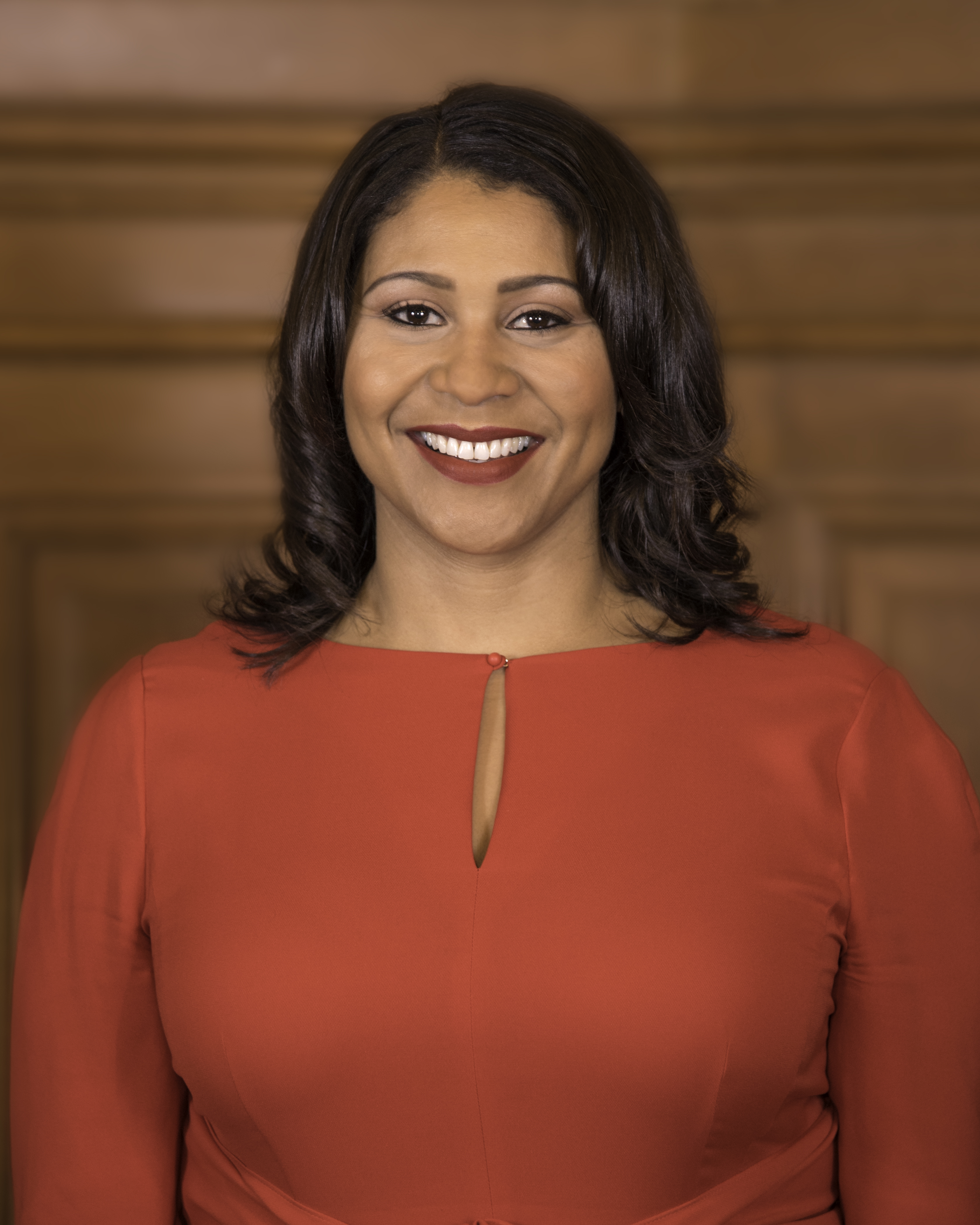
Official portrait for the San Francisco Board of Supervisors

In November 2012, Breed was elected to the District 5 supervisor seat, defeating incumbent Christina Olague, who had been appointed to the seat that year by Mayor Ed Lee after Supervisor Ross Mirkarimi was elected sheriff. Following five rounds of ranked-choice voting allocations, Breed won by over 12 points.

During her first few months as Supervisor in 2013, Breed persuaded city departments to complete two new bike lanes on Oak and Fell Streets ahead of schedule, prompting the local transportation site StreetsblogSF to say she had “emerged as a bicycling champion.” She secured federal funding for the redesign of Masonic Boulevard in her district, which added bike lanes and traffic safety measures to one of the most dangerous corridors in the city. The official ribbon-cutting for the completed Masonic Avenue Streetscape Improvement Project between Geary Boulevard and the Panhandle took place in August 2018. The project cost $25 million. The bicycle improvements were limited to a buffered bike lane, which typically cost $15,000 per mile.

Breed was inaugurated as District 5 supervisor on January 8, 2013, with then–California Attorney General Kamala Harris administering the oath of office. On January 8, 2015, Breed was elected President of the San Francisco Board of Supervisors first by a vote of 8 to 3 and then unanimously. She defeated supervisor David Campos, who was also nominated for the position. Breed succeeded District Four Supervisor Katy Tang, who assumed the presidency temporarily after then-Board President David Chiu resigned to begin serving in the California State Assembly.

Breed cosponsored 2014's Proposition A, a $500 million bond to fund street repaving, infrastructure repair, transit service improvements, and increased bicycle and pedestrian safety. It passed with 72% support. She was also the deciding vote to place 2014's Proposition B on the ballot, which required transportation funding to be increased with population growth. It passed with 61% support and now provides approximately $25 million per year for transit, bike, and pedestrian improvements. When Kezar Drive, a major thoroughfare in her district, fell into disrepair, Breed addressed what she called a "case study in bureaucracy" between the Department of Public Works and Recreation and Parks Department and got the road repaved.

In 2015, Breed helped pass "neighborhood preference" legislation to prioritize neighborhood residents for the affordable homes built in their community. When the federal Department of Housing and Urban Development threatened to block the legislation, she flew to Washington, D.C., with a delegation of San Francisco officials and persuaded it to let the program proceed. The program first went into effect for the Willie B. Kennedy apartments in Breed's district, with 39 units prioritized for community residents at risk of economic displacement.

San Francisco passed legislation in 2015 to create the Neighborhood Commercial Transit District in the Divisadero and Fillmore corridors in her district. The laws removed housing density caps, allowing more homes to be built on a given parcel without increasing the building's size or height. The Affordable Divis group requested that Breed rescind the law, citing concerns about the availability of affordable units and lack of community input. She declined, citing the need for more homes in the city and conflicts with Proposition C from 2012.

In April 2015, the city of San Francisco passed legislation to remove minimum parking space requirements for new buildings and allow unused parking spaces in existing buildings to be converted housing.

The San Francisco Fire Department's response times to emergency medical calls spiked dramatically in 2014, with ambulances often unavailable to respond. Breed was outspoken in demanding improvements, pushing then-Mayor Lee to do more, expressing a lack of confidence in Fire Chief Joanne Hayes-White, and generating press attention for the issue. Breed fought for substantially more funding for emergency medical services, ultimately succeeding in getting $47.3 million invested to hire EMTs, paramedics, firefighters, and 911 dispatchers, as well as buy new ambulances and fire trucks, and improve SFFD facilities. Breed has cited her work on this issue as helping to reduce ambulance response times by over 26%. Her work also helped her earn the sole endorsement of the San Francisco Firefighters Local 798 union in the 2018 mayoral election.

In 2015, Breed worked with then-Mayor Ed Lee to help add 400 new police officers to the San Francisco Police Department. After the shooting of Mario Woods by San Francisco police officers on December 2, 2015, Breed and Supervisor Malia Cohen passed a Resolution calling for a federal investigation of the shooting and a Department of Justice review of the SFPD's use of force policies. This ultimately resulted in 272 recommendations to improve the SFPD.

As part of an FBI investigation into public corruption and bid-fixing primarily involving then-State Senator Leland Yee, businessman Derf Butler was recorded talking about allegedly paying for access to Breed. According to court documents released in 2015, Butler told an FBI source that he "pays Supervisor Breed with untraceable debit cards for clothing and trips in exchange for advantages on contracts in San Francisco." The allegation was denied by Breed, who as a member of the Board of Supervisors, had no role in contract selections, and no evidence has ever been presented to substantiate it.

Breed was the lead sponsor and co-sponsor of two housing ballot measures: Proposition A in 2015, a $310 million bond for affordable housing which passed with 74% support, and Proposition C in 2016, a $261 million housing bond that repurposed unused city bond funds for affordable housing and passed with 77% support. Breed joined Supervisor Ahsha Safai in supporting the 2018 "Housing for All" ballot measure, Proposition D, to increase the city's tax on commercial rents to "raise about $100 million a year to pay for 10,000 low- and middle-income housing units and shelter accommodations for the city’s homeless population over the next decade." After facing a competing tax increase measure, Prop D did not pass.

In February 2016, Breed announced her reelection bid to represent District 5. The top issues she identified in her announcement were building and protecting affordable housing, increasing public safety, improving environmental health, and modernizing public transportation. Dean Preston, an attorney, ran against her. Breed won reelection 52% to 48% on November 8, 2016, beating Preston in 46 of the district's 68 precincts.

In 2017, Breed coauthored legislation to provide civil counsel for tenants facing eviction, reducing the chances of vulnerable tenants unfairly losing their homes. Voters approved a similar measure in June 2018, Proposition F.

Breed was unanimously reelected to another two-year term as Board President on January 9, 2017. No other supervisors were nominated for the position.

== Mayor of San Francisco ==
Following the death of Mayor Ed Lee on December 12, 2017, Breed became the city's Acting Mayor by virtue of her position as President of the Board of Supervisors. She served in this position until January 23, 2018, when the Board of Supervisors selected Mark Farrell to serve as the interim "caretaker" mayor until a special election on June 5. Supervisors Aaron Peskin, Jane Kim (herself a candidate for Mayor), and others considered the progressive members of the board, sought to deny Breed the benefits of incumbency going into the election and to maintain a separation of powers between the positions of mayor and board president, both of which Breed occupied at the time. Progressive Supervisor Hillary Ronen delivered a speech accusing Breed of being supported by "white, rich men" and billionaires such as Ron Conway. Ronen's choice for interim mayor, Mark Farrell, was a white male venture capitalist whose firm Conway had invested in.

Breed ran in the mayoral special election held on June 5. She led in the initial count's first-place votes with 35.6 percent, with Mark Leno in second with 25.9 percent, and Kim with 22.8 percent. Leno took the lead early the next day after the initial tabulation of ranked-choice ballots, but Breed retook the lead on June 9. On June 13, with 9,000 ballots left to count, Leno conceded defeat and congratulated Breed on her victory. Breed resigned as president of the Board of Supervisors on June 26, 2018, and was succeeded by Malia Cohen in a unanimous vote by the Board. Breed retained her position as District 5 supervisor until assuming the mayoralty on July 11. Breed was elected to a full term in the 2019 mayoral election against five relatively unknown candidates.

In March 2019, Breed awarded a posthumous certificate of honor to Sinn Féin politician and former IRA member Martin McGuinness for his "courageous service in the military". The nomination had been made by the United Irish Societies, who had appointed him honorary marshal in the St. Patrick's Day parade. She apologized two days later following controversy over McGuinness's involvement with the IRA.

On March 7, 2019, Breed and several other Northern California mayors endorsed Kamala Harris for president in the 2020 Democratic Party presidential primaries. Harris later dropped out of the race. On January 23, 2020, Breed endorsed Mike Bloomberg for president in the primaries.

In December 2020, Governor Gavin Newsom announced that Alex Padilla would succeed Kamala Harris as U.S. senator after she was elected to serve as Vice President of the United States. Breed and former San Francisco mayor Willie Brown expressed disappointment that the replacement for the seat was not an African American woman as Harris was the only African American woman serving in the Senate at the time.

In the 2024 US presidential election, Breed quickly endorsed Kamala Harris once Joe Biden had dropped out.

In 2024, she ran for re-election against a crowded field of candidates, including several moderate Democrats with similar policy positions to herself. She conceded the race to Democrat Daniel Lurie on November 7, 2024.

=== Dream Keeper corruption allegations ===
On February 25, 2021, Breed announced the "Dream Keeper" initiative to invest $120 million from former law enforcement budgets into revitalization of San Francisco's black community. A 2024 investigation by the San Francisco Chronicle alleged improper financial conduct and prohibited purchases. The San Francisco Standard also reported that the former Human Rights Commissioner, Sheryl Davis, approved contracts from Collective Impact, a nonprofit run by James Spingola (who shared a living space with Davis). Breed argued that funding was paused before the discrepancy was discovered, but her detractors called for a federal corruption investigation. In December 2024, the city canceled several contracts with Collective Impact, citing "significant conflicts of interest." Spingola rejected accusations of wrongdoing and likened the affair to "an attack on Black people."

=== Public safety ===
In July 2019, Breed signed an ordinance effectively banning the sale of e-cigarettes in San Francisco, both at brick-and-mortar stores and online to a San Francisco address.

In 2021, Breed announced a State of Emergency in the Tenderloin in order to more efficiently implement her Tenderloin Intervention Plan, which included conducting extensive community outreach, engaging in direct intervention on the “most destructive” problems facing the Tenderloin community, and finally, implementing sustained public safety and accessibility operations. After the 90-day State of Emergency concluded, ABC7 reported that significant progress had been made in the area, stating that “Eleven-thousand grams of fentanyl have been seized and ten percent of drug users who have come to get help have agreed to some kind of treatment or medical care.”

In late 2023, Breed announced the creation of a new Joint Task Force with SFPD, the San Francisco District Attorney’s Office, the California Highway Patrol, and the California National Guard in order to combat the opioid epidemic.

On September 26, 2024, the San Francisco Examiner reported that San Francisco’s 2024 crime rate at its the lowest in 10 years, and that if the murder rate continued its current trend, the City was on track to see “the lowest number of reported homicides since 1960.” The drop in reported crime rates included a 14% drop in the rate of violent crime and a 34% drop in the rate of property crime as compared to the same period of 2023.

In order to combat a wave of retail thefts, Breed instituted a “Retail Theft Blitz.” In November 2023, the Mayor’s office reported that the effort resulted in over three hundred arrests during 2023 alone. Breed also sponsored Proposition E, which San Francisco voters approved on March 5, 2024 with a 9-point margin. This proposition authorized the San Francisco Police Department to utilize drones instead of or in addition to car chases, and allowed SFPD officers to engage in more efficient reporting practices.

On May 29, 2024, Mayor London Breed and San Francisco Police Chief Bill Scott announced that the city's multi-agency crackdown on drug markets in the Tenderloin and South of Market neighborhoods had led to 3,000 arrests since the beginning of the campaign exactly one year before. This initiative was launched in response to the fentanyl crisis in the Tenderloin and SOMA neighborhoods, common for rampant drug dealing and use, and deteriorating street conditions characterized by litter, public defecation, homelessness, and crime.

On August, 29th, 2024, the City reported that auto break-ins dropped 57% compared to the same period in 2023, thanks in part to the use of drones, automated license plate readers, and bait operations.

Progressive activists criticized Breed for allegedly appealing to right-wing voters by reversing her support for the 2014 Proposition 47 (which had recategorized several nonviolent offenses including shoplifting as misdemeanors, rather than felonies), and endorsing the 2024 Proposition 36 (which repealed parts of Proposition 47).

=== Housing ===
Mayor Breed is on record of supporting all housing, including affordable and market-rate housing, and has stated she would veto any "anti-housing" legislation that crossed her desk. In 2019, Breed sponsored a $600 million housing bond which voters approved by a 42% margin. Breed also created the “30x30 Plan,” which would bring 30,000 new residents to San Francisco by 2030. This was to be accomplished by converting office buildings to residential and commercial, constructing new student housing, and working with state leaders to create incentives for businesses to move to or remain in San Francisco's downtown. To facilitate the conversion of office buildings to residential uses, Breed implemented the Commercial to Residential Adaptive Reuse Program, which streamlines the permitting and approval process to facilitate quicker construction of new housing.

Breed sponsored Proposition C in San Francisco's March, 2024 primary election, which gives a transfer tax exemption the first time commercial properties are converted into residential uses. Proposition C passed with a 5% margin. Despite these new exemptions, according to the San Francisco Standard, current incentives are insufficient to facilitate new projects despite 13% of the City's office buildings being viable candidates for conversion. On September 26, 2024, Mayor Breed and Supervisor Matt Dorsey (who represents much of Downtown and the Financial District) proposed legislation which would eliminate office to housing conversion fees. These fees typically account for $70,000-90,000 per unit in additional cost, according to the Mayor's office.

Breed is a major advocate for modular housing, arguing that it can be built more quickly and cheaply than conventional construction, helping the city create more housing sooner. As Acting Mayor, she announced a partnership with labor unions to build a modular housing factory in or near San Francisco.

As Mayor, Breed aligned herself with pro-housing leaders like State Senator Scott Wiener and the SF YIMBY (Yes In My Back Yard) organization. Both Senator Wiener and SF YIMBY endorsed Breed's 2024 re-election campaign. In her inaugural address on July 11, 2018, Breed said: “The politics of ‘no’ has plagued our city for far too long—‘not on my block, not in my backyard.’ We have made mistakes in the past by not moving housing production forward all over this city. I plan to change the politics of ‘no’ to the politics of ‘yes.’ Yes, we will build more housing.”

In 2024, Breed's Department of Planning advanced a new zoning plan in San Francisco which would facilitate reaching the 82,000 unit goal. This plan includes increasing density along certain corridors in San Francisco's western neighborhoods, such as the Sunset, Richmond, and Lakeside, which are predominantly made up of single-family homes. Under the new zoning plan, height and density restrictions are to remain in place in most of the Western portion of the city, except along transit corridors and certain corner lots.

=== Transportation ===
==== Muni and transit service ====
In 2024, 72% of Muni riders rated Muni service as "good" or "excellent," the highest rating since Muni began collecting public opinion information in 2001. As of 2023, San Francisco has over 75 miles of bus lanes, and the pace of bus lane rollout has increased dramatically under Breed. Breed's SFMTA has created several Bus Rapid Transit routes, including the Van Ness Bus Rapid Transit corridor and the Geary Bus Rapid Transit corridor.

Breed carried multiple pieces of legislation allowing Muni to purchase hundreds of new buses and replace its entire fleet of trains. Introduced over several years, her legislation provided for 50 hybrid buses, 260 light rail vehicles, 61 hybrid buses, 60 trolley buses, 98 hybrid buses, and 33 trolley buses. The 260 new light rail vehicles are slated to replace Muni's aging fleet of Breda trains, add 24 trains for the new Central Subway, and provide 85 more trains for added service throughout the system. Built by Siemens in Sacramento, the new trains are lighter and quieter than the ones they replace and project to run almost 12 times longer before needing major repair. The first Siemens train went into service in San Francisco in 2017.

Breed worked with the San Francisco Municipal Transportation Agency and Bay Area Rapid Transit and carried the legislation to add cellular service for riders on Muni's underground trains. The lack of cell service has been a long-standing complaint by riders.

==== Bikes and street safety ====
Mayor London Breed has continued San Francisco’s commitment to Vision Zero, a pledge to eliminate injuries and deaths from road accidents. As of spring 2024, 72% of all bike lanes in San Francisco were built during Breed’s tenure as Mayor. In 2018, Breed requested the SFMTA Board of Directors expedite their project delivery process. In response, the Board passed a resolution that enables the agency to deliver “Quick Build” projects. These projects are focused along high-injury corridors and are designed to be reversible and cheaply implemented. As of Spring, 2024, the City had completed 39 Quick Build projects.

In an effort to create more outdoor community spaces during the 2020 COVID-19 pandemic lockdown, Breed closed 1.5 miles of JFK Promenade to cars. She introduced legislation to the Board of Supervisors on April 28, 2022, to ensure that JFK Promenade would remain a car-free community space. In November, 2023, San Francisco voters approved Proposition J with 63% of the vote, extending car-free JFK indefinitely. Due to JFK’s closure to cars, there is an uninterrupted car-free path from the Panhandle to Ocean Beach (4.6 miles). Breed also supports further efforts to create more pedestrian spaces around the city. In her 2024 Transportation Vision, she voiced support for banning cars along parts of Haight Street and in North Beach.

Breed’s SFMTA also established the Slow Streets Program in 2020 in order to create a network of “safe, comfortable, low-vehicle-traffic routes” throughout San Francisco, to facilitate active modes of transportation such as biking and walking. The Slow Streets Program was an immediate success, with a 2021 SFMTA study finding that average vehicle speeds decreased by 14% and collisions decreased by 36%.

Under Breed, San Francisco has begun to install speed cameras. Until 2024, this was banned by state law, and San Francisco is one of five Californian cities to begin installing speed cameras, which have proven effective in reducing traffic speeds and fatalities in other cities.

=== Homelessness ===
On September 26, 2024, Breed announced that her administration is on track to increase San Francisco's shelter capacity by 90% by 2025, three years ahead of schedule. Since Breed became Mayor in 2018, the City has given shelter to nearly 10,000 individuals, and helped 5,250 people move into housing. As of 2024, San Francisco's street homelessness rate was at its lowest point in 10 years.

Breed has made homelessness a focus in her administration. In October 2018, she announced plans to build 1,000 shelter beds by 2020. To help achieve this goal, she introduced legislation declaring a shelter crisis in San Francisco, which allows the city to waive certain permitting and contracting requirements for homeless services. She also has worked to expand mental health and substance abuse recovery beds. When the Controller found an extra $415 million in property taxes, Breed introduced legislation to fund housing and homelessness programs with the discretionary portion of the funding. She also authored legislation with Supervisor Rafael Mandelman to expand San Francisco's conservatorship laws, based on California Senate Bill 1045, authored by State Senator Scott Wiener.

After the U.S. Supreme Court ruled in 2024 that municipalities can remove homeless encampments, Breed has advocated for and authorized sweeps of encampments.

During Breed's tenure, San Francisco increased access to shelter and housing for the homeless. Due to these anti-homelessness efforts, San Francisco is the only Bay Area city that has a shrinking homelessness rate.

=== COVID-19 response ===
San Francisco issued a state of emergency because of COVID-19 in February 2020, before the federal government suggested doing so, and San Francisco became one of the first American cities to go into lockdown. On March 2, Breed advised residents, "Prepare for possible disruption from an outbreak". Under the state of emergency, private gyms were required to shut down, but the city government petitioned Cal/OSHA for a waiver to allow various government employees to continue to use gyms in city-owned facilities, which were allowed to continue to operate.

On April 24, 2020, Breed reported that her city's PPE orders had been diverted to other cities and countries. She said, "We’ve had issues of our orders being relocated by our suppliers in China. For example, we had isolation gowns on their way to San Francisco and they were diverted to France. We’ve had situations when things we’ve ordered that have gone through Customs were confiscated by FEMA to be diverted to other locations."

In November 2020, Breed attended an eight-person birthday party at the Michelin 3-star restaurant French Laundry in Napa County during the COVID-19 pandemic in California. The event was held in a partially enclosed room, despite California Department of Public Health discouraging such gatherings with a recommended three-household cap. Napa County allowed indoor dining at the time without a household cap. Still, Heather Knight of San Francisco Chronicle noted that the event violated San Francisco health guidelines at the time. San Francisco banned indoor dining three days later. Breed and other California politicians such as Governor Gavin Newsom and San Jose Mayor Sam Liccardo were criticized for not following the same public health guidelines they administered.

During the pandemic, sidewalks and parking spaces were turned into outdoor dining spaces. In 2021, Breed called for allowing small businesses to use sidewalk and parking spaces indefinitely as outdoor dining spaces.

In 2021, Mayor Breed announced two separate vaccine requirements for the city. On June 24 2021, all 35,000 employees of San Francisco's city government were forced to get vaccinated. On August 12, 2021, Mayor Breed announced a vaccine passport for several indoor venues in the city. Proof of vaccination was required of patrons and employees of bars, restaurants, gyms, and event venues. Vaccinations were also required of healthcare workers, daycare workers, dentist offices, and residential care facilities. San Francisco was the first city in the United States to enforce a full vaccine mandate, effectively keeping the non-vaccinated from participating in everyday activities. The Black Employee Alliance and Coalition Against Anti-Blackness criticized the mandate for being negligent and putting black employees in a negligent position. Further, San Francisco disregarded religious exemption requests from their employees. Out of the 800 exemption requests, including 260 first responders, they were all denied.

On September 16, 2021, videos surfaced showing Breed violating the city's mask mandate by not wearing a mask indoors while dancing at the Black Cat nightclub. She later explained the onstage reunion of the original members of Tony! Toni! Toné! "was something really monumental that occurred...I got up and started dancing because I was feeling the spirit and I wasn’t thinking about a mask."

The following November, Breed was again spotted partying without a mask at the nightclub Great Northern, despite a regional mask mandate in place at the time.

=== Association with Mohammed Nuru ===
A series of 2018 reports in the San Francisco Examiner focused on Breed's use of campaign funds carried over from previous years to pay for floats in San Francisco's annual Pride parade, and a 2020 report found that Nick Bovis, a restaurant owner arrested alongside Mohammed Nuru, was solely named on an invoice to pay for Breed's 2015 Pride float, when she was a member of the Board of Supervisors.

Following the FBI's arrest of San Francisco Department of Public Works director Mohammed Nuru on corruption charges, Breed published an article on Medium on February 14, 2020, acknowledging a longtime friendship and a brief relationship with Nuru. The post also reported that Nuru gave Breed $5,600 for car repairs. Breed argued she did not have to disclose since her and Nuru's relationship preceded her mayoralty but was doing so in "the spirit of transparency".

A 2020 report in the San Francisco Chronicle found that the woman identified as "Girlfriend 1" by federal officials in the criminal complaint filed against Nuru was Sandra Zuniga, former Director of the city's "Fix-It Team" and of the Office of Neighborhood Services. The Neighborhood Services Office was dissolved shortly after Zuniga was identified as "Girlfriend 1" and remains inactive. In August 2021, Breed was fined $22,000 for abusing her office in a series of ethics violations.

=== Environmental protection ===
==== CleanPowerSF ====
Breed's launched the city's clean electrical energy program, CleanPowerSF, a Community Choice Aggregation program in which San Francisco purchases renewable, greenhouse-gas-free electrical energy and makes it available to San Francisco ratepayers. Its ultimate goal is to achieve 100% clean electrical energy in the city. According to the San Francisco Department of the Environment's Climate Action Strategy: "Moving to 100% renewable electricity is the single biggest step the City can take to reduce GHG [Greenhouse Gas] emissions. The potential GHG emissions reduction from this program is estimated to total 941,000 metric tons (mT) of CO2e annually by 2030."

When Breed took office in 2013 CleanPowerSF had, according to the San Francisco League of Conservation Voters, "languished for 12 years" in the face of opposition from multiple mayoral administrations, the city's utility provider PG&E, and other business interests. "Breed took it upon herself to get CleanPowerSF off the ground," said the League of Conservation Voters.

Under the city's charter, the San Francisco Public Utilities Commission had ultimate authority to approve or reject the program. When they rejected proposed power rates for the program in August 2013, Breed authored a resolution at the Board of Supervisors, arguing: "In failing to set not-to-exceed rates for CleanPowerSF, the Public Utilities Commission is contradicting the policy directives of the Board of Supervisors...The Board of Supervisors refuses to acquiesce its policymaking authority to the Executive bureaucracy; and... If the Public Utilities Commissioners fail to set not-to-exceed rates, or hereafter fail in any way to timely implement CleanPowerSF, the Board of Supervisors shall, whether at the Board Chamber or the ballot, exercise every means at its disposal to enact its policy objective."

Breed worked for the subsequent 17 months to launch CleanPowerSF, often fighting with the Lee administration. In January 2015, Mayor Lee announced he would support a slightly revised version of CleanPowerSF, and the program proceeded toward launch.

In the summer of 2015, the International Brotherhood of Electrical Workers Local Union 1245, which represents PG&E employees, submitted a ballot measure, Proposition G, that would have imposed restrictions on CleanPowerSF. Breed and former Supervisor John Avalos wrote a competing measure, Proposition H, that would have required PG&E to disclose its use of nuclear power among other things. Following negotiations between IBEW representative Hunter Stern and Breed, Avalos, and their staff, IBEW agreed to oppose their own proposition and support Breed's measure. It passed with 80% support.

==== Polystyrene ban ====
In 2016, the city of San Francisco passed the nation's strongest ban on sale and use of products made from polystyrene foam, including expanded polystyrene foam (also called Styrofoam) for food service ware, egg cartons, coolers, and packing peanuts. The law made national news.

In the final week of Breed's 2016 reelection campaign, she released a comical web video about the legislation, "Styrofoam Monster". In the ad, she chases away a bully who is dressed in a costume made of polystyrene foam. The San Francisco Chronicle wrote, "The award for most creative campaign ad goes to Board of Supervisors President London Breed..[It] is akin to an ingenious high school video production."

==== Drug take back legislation ====
In 2015, the city of San Francisco passed legislation requiring drug manufacturers to fund a drug take-back program in San Francisco, enabling consumers to place unused medications in secure drop-off bins in pharmacies. Unused drugs are often disposed in the trash or toilet which can pollute waterways or lead to accidental poisonings. Breed published an op-ed in support of the legislation. It passed unanimously on March 17, 2015, making San Francisco only the third county in the nation to launch such a program. The program has collected well over 20 tons of medications.

Despite her environmental record during her first term on the Board of Supervisors, the local chapter of the Sierra Club endorsed her opponent. This prompted Breed's then-Chief of Staff Conor Johnston to write a scathing article in the San Francisco Examiner accusing the local Sierra Club chapter of hypocrisy and "bewildering anti-environmentalism" for blocking new housing and engaging in "political tribalism".

=== Basic income ===
Breed has explored multiple options for guaranteed income. In March 2021, Breed launched a program to provide guaranteed income to artists impacted by the COVID-19 pandemic. Then, in November 2022, Breed launched a program to provide income for low income transgender individuals.

=== Resignation letters controversy ===
In September 2022, a public records request revealed Breed had required 48 of her appointees to boards and commissions to sign undated letters of resignation for her use. The Mayor's spokesperson stated the letters were only for "the most extreme circumstances." Breed later announced she would discontinue the practice.

=== Panda diplomacy ===
At the end of the APEC United States 2023 summit, Breed requested pandas for San Francisco from General Secretary of the Chinese Communist Party Xi Jinping. In 2024, Breed traveled to China on a trip organized by the Chinese People's Association for Friendship with Foreign Countries in an attempt to procure pandas for the city.

=== Poop Patrol ===
The San Francisco Poop Patrol is a team established by Breed in 2018 to address the issue of human and animal waste on the city streets. The Poop Patrol consists of five employees from the Department of Public Works, along with a supervisor. They are tasked with proactively identifying and cleaning up waste in areas that receive the most complaints. The team uses steam cleaners to sanitize the streets after removing waste. The city allocated $830,977 for the program in its initial phase, with additional funds dedicated to expanding public restroom facilities and services like the Pit Stop program. Breed tweeted about the Poop Patrol: “This is another step to keeping our streets clean and providing additional help to areas in need of attention” In the year before the Poop Patrol began work, residents made over 14,000 complaints about feces in the streets. By 2021, San Francisco saw a decrease in reports of feces on streets compared to previous years, partly due to the Poop Patrol's efforts and the reopening of indoor restrooms after the COVID pandemic restrictions were lifted.

== Personal life ==
As of 2020, Breed lives in San Francisco's Lower Haight neighborhood. Before Breed became mayor, she lived in a rent-controlled apartment.

In February 2020, Breed made the Nob Hill Gazette's ranking of "A-List Eligibles," listing single celebrities who are notable in San Francisco. The Gazette described Breed as "quite possibly the City’s hardest-working bachelorette," with Breed naming Brad Pitt and Denzel Washington as her celebrity crushes.

== See also ==
- List of first African-American mayors
- African American mayors in California
- List of mayors of the 50 largest cities in the United States

Political offices
Preceded by Katy Tang	President of the San Francisco Board of Supervisors; 2015–2018	Succeeded by Malia Cohen
Preceded by Ed Lee	Mayor of San Francisco; Acting; 2017–2018	Succeeded by Mark Farrell
Preceded by Mark Farrell	Mayor of San Francisco; 2018–2025	Succeeded by Daniel Lurie
