= Vallie Brown =

American politician

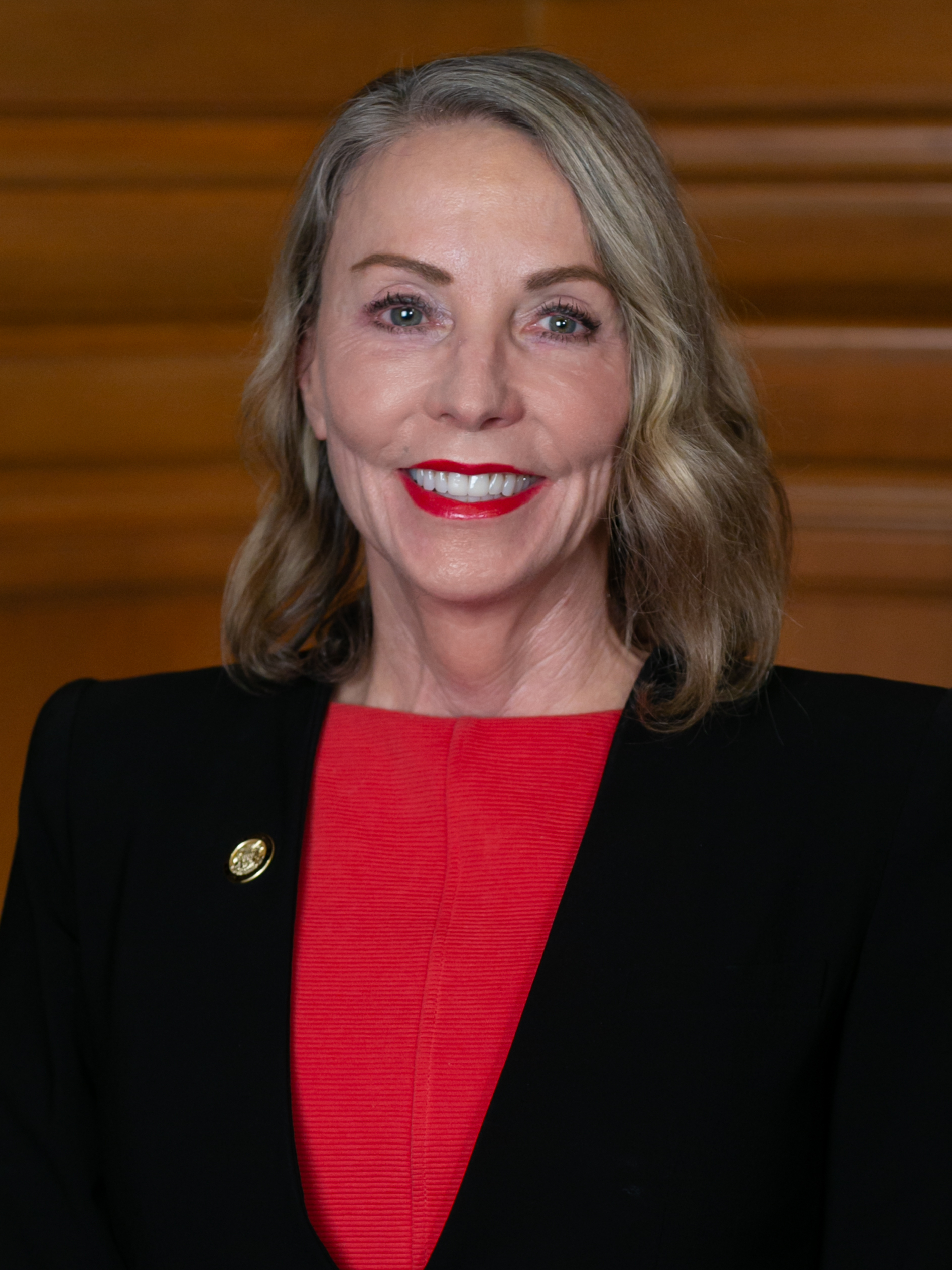
- Official portrait, 2019

Member of the San Francisco Board of Supervisors from the 5th district
- In office July 16, 2018 – December 16, 2019
- Mayor: London Breed
- Preceded by: London Breed
- Succeeded by: Dean Preston

Personal details
- Party: Democratic
- Education: University of Utah
- Occupation: Politician
- Profession: Activist and politician

Vallie Brown is an American politician who was formerly on the San Francisco Board of Supervisors, representing District 5.

Prior to her appointment to the Board of Supervisors, she worked for the San Francisco Office of Economic and Workforce Development and was a legislative aide to former District 5 supervisors Ross Mirkarimi and London Breed. Subsequent to her departure from the Board of Supervisors, Brown ran for the Democratic County Central Committee (DCCC) in the 17th Assembly District. She unsuccessfully ran again against Preston for her former seat in the November 2020 election.

== Early life ==
Brown grew up in Utah. Her father died when she was one, and she raised by her grandmother and mother. As a child, she experienced housing insecurity, sometimes sleeping with her mother in their car. At the age of 12, she lost her grandmother and her mother died shortly thereafter because she lacked adequate healthcare. Upon her mother's death, she was raised by a combination of neighbors and the families of her friends.

Brown studied art at the University of Utah. She moved to San Francisco in 1985.

== Career ==
=== Activism ===
In San Francisco, Brown started an art program at the Hunter's Point Boys and Girls Club; noticing the high incidence of breast cancer and asthma in the neighborhood, she started raising awareness of chemical hazards and became an environmental activist. In 2004, Brown founded the Lower Haight Neighborhood Association.

=== San Francisco government ===
Brown served as an aide to Supervisor Ross Mirkarimi of District 5 from 2006 to 2013. She served as aide to Supervisor London Breed from 2013 to 2016.

Afterward, she worked as a project manager at the Office of Economic and Workforce Development.

== San Francisco Board of Supervisors ==
Upon her election as mayor in a special election triggered by the death of Mayor Edwin Lee, London Breed appointed Brown to her seat on the Board of Supervisors in July 2018.

=== Small businesses ===
Brown proposed a $9 million fund to provide low-interest loans, resources for storefront improvements, and financial assistance for regulatory fees to small businesses.

Brown proposed a measure in April 2019 requiring physical store locations to carry cash. The law was passed unanimously by the Board.

=== Environmental issues ===
Brown cosponsored legislation to require commercial properties over 50,000 sq. ft. to use 100% renewable energy by 2030, and introduced legislation to mandate that residential buildings over 50,000 sq. ft. report their energy use to the city. Brown worked on legislation to increase San Francisco's tax on plastic bags to 25 cents from 10 cents, and to ban the use of plastic bags in the produce sections of supermarkets.

=== Public transportation ===
During the "Muni Meltdown" of 2018, Supervisor Brown called a hearing on San Francisco's public transportation system. She discovered a shortage of 400 transit operators daily, due to the low wages paid by the city.

=== Mental health ===
Working with Supervisor Rafael Mandelman, Brown authorized the creation of a conservatorship program, allowing the city to seek court orders allowing it (or a family member) to intervene in the affairs of people suffering from severe mental illness, directing them into drug addiction or mental health treatment.

=== Housing and homelessness ===
Brown spearheaded a $40 million expansion of the Small Sites Program to buy buildings from landlords who were intending to evict their tenants under the Ellis Act to sell the building. Under this program, the units are turned into affordable housing. Brown also arranged funding Prop F, which was passed by San Francisco voters in 2018, providing free legal assistance to renters facing eviction. Brown also cosponsored a measure to earmark 50% of the city's revenue from the state's ERAF program to be used on affordable housing.

Brown proposed legislation to create a Vehicular Navigation Center, aimed towards people living in their cars. More than 400 people sleep in vehicles on the streets of San Francisco each night.

Brown established a program which opens churches to homeless people during the day, allowing them to rest, use restrooms, and access social workers who can assist them.

=== 2019 special election ===
In November 2019, Brown lost to Dean Preston in a special election for the San Francisco Board of Supervisors. On May 29, 2020, she announced that she was running again in the November 2020 Board of Supervisor's election. She lost to Preston by a wide margin.

== Personal life ==
Brown is of Paiute and Shoshone descent.

Brown lived mostly in artist's warehouses but often struggled to pay rent during her stints in apartments and houses, facing eviction on multiple occasions.

Brown and three other friends entered a tenancy-in-common arrangement and purchased a Victorian home in San Francisco's Lower Haight neighborhood in 1994 through probate court. This purchase, however, evicted several low income African American tenants from the property. Brown alleged on the 2019 campaign trail that the tenants had not paid their rent. She later apologized for falsely accusing them when court documents proved otherwise.

== See also ==
- List of Native American politicians
- Native American women in politics
