= Bayview–Hunters Point, San Francisco =

Neighborhood in San Francisco, California

Bayview–Hunters Point
- Neighborhood
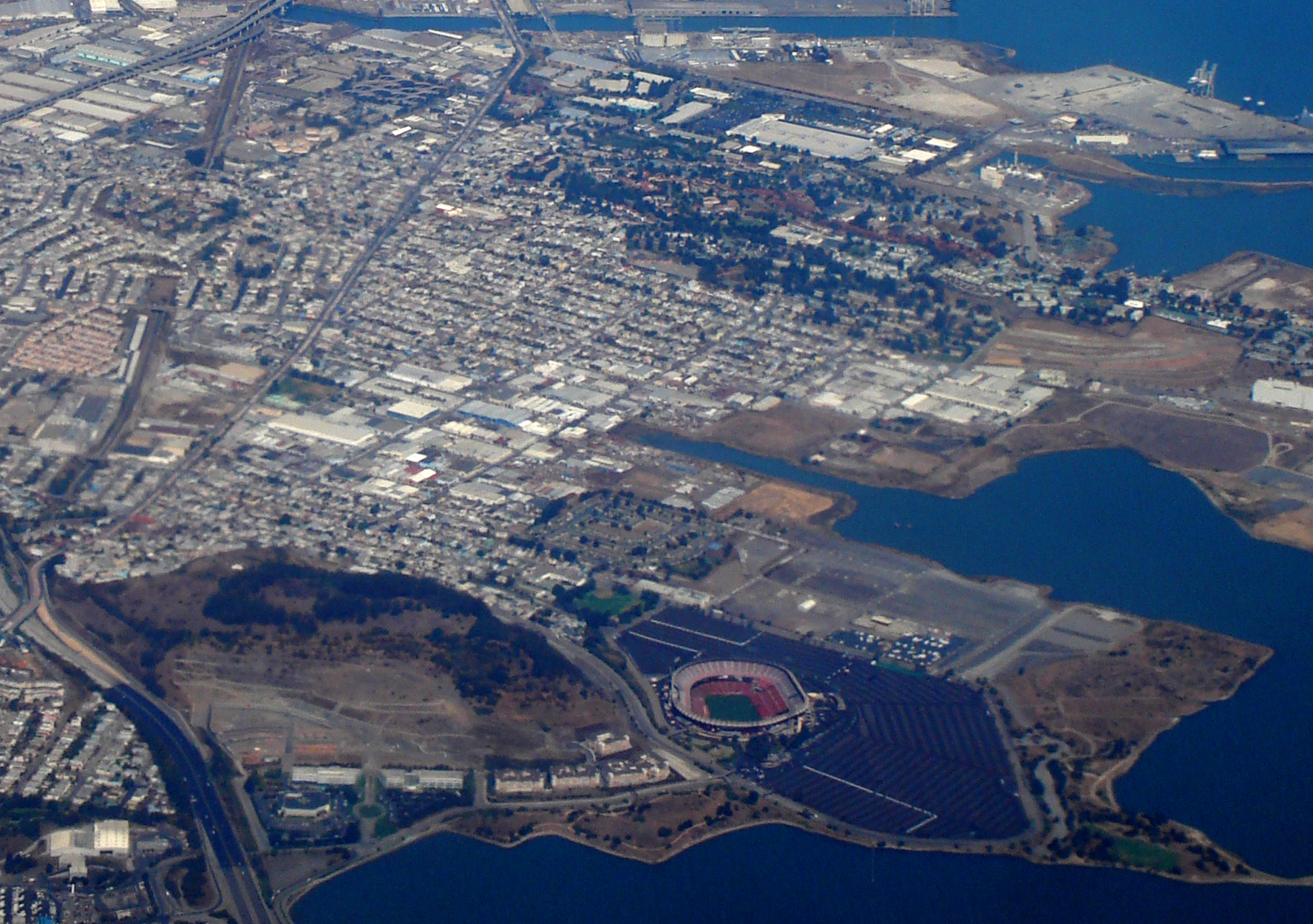
- A bird's-eye view of the Bayview–Hunters Point neighborhood of San Francisco. Candlestick Park, demolished in 2015, is in the foreground.
- Nicknames: Beacon Point & Conch Point (1700s), Potrero Viejo (1830s–1860s), Butchertown (1830s–1960s), Southern San Francisco (1839; on some maps), Hunters Point Shipyard (1869–1939), Railroad Avenue (former name for "3rd Street"; 1886–1910), Bayview-Hunter's Point (1960s–present), Bayview Heights ("redevelopment" name; 2010s–present) – The Point (nickname), The Port (nickname), The Yard (nickname ref to the Shipyard), The Bayview (nickname), HP (nickname), District 10 (in politics), Bayview-HP (shortened in media), BVHP, BHP (abbreviated on paper), Bayview-Hunter's Point, San Francisco (to avoid confusion with other neighborhoods with the name "Bayview"), Bayview, SF (seen on tech apps), Bayview-Hunter's Point Neighborhood (Google search), Bayview, San Francisco (for Google search & specificity)
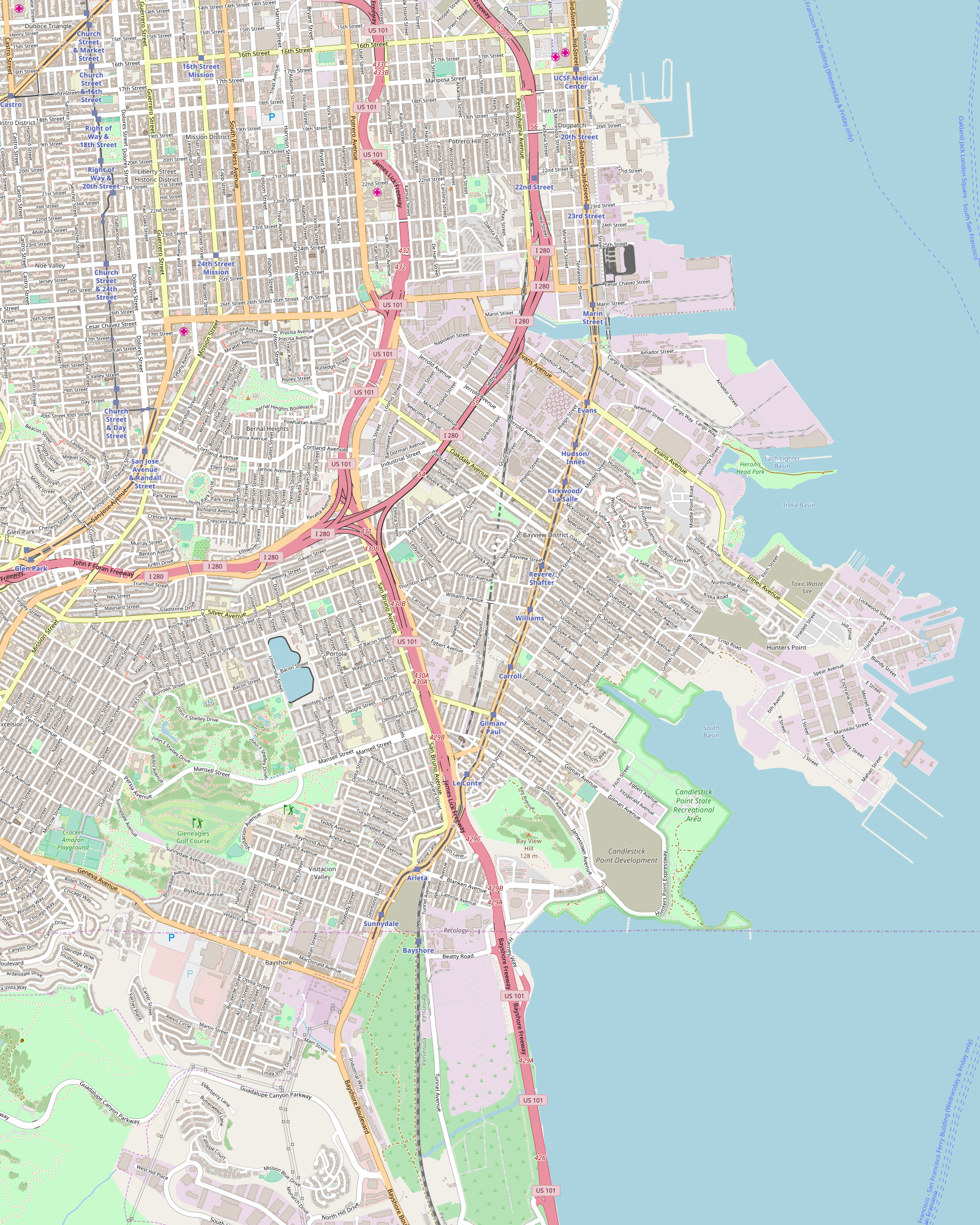
- Location within San Francisco Bayview–Hunters Point (San Francisco County)
- Coordinates: 37.72687°N 122.38873°W
- Country: United States
- State: California
- City-county: San Francisco

Government
  - Supervisor: Shamann Walton
  - Assemblymember: Matt Haney (D)
  - State senator: Scott Wiener (D)
  - U. S. rep.: Nancy Pelosi (D)

Area
  - Total: 3.95 sq mi (10.2 km^{2})

Population (2010)
  - Total: 35,890
- Time zone: UTC−8 (Pacific)
  - Summer (DST): UTC−7 (PDT)
- ZIP Code: 94124
- Area codes: 415/628

Bayview–Hunters Point (sometimes spelled Bay View or Bayview) is the San Francisco, California, neighborhood combining the Bayview and Hunters Point neighborhoods in the southeastern corner of the city. The decommissioned Hunters Point Naval Shipyard is located within its boundaries and Candlestick Park, which was demolished in 2015, was on the southern edge. Due to the southeastern location, the two neighborhoods are often merged. Bayview–Hunters Point has been labeled as San Francisco's "Most Isolated Neighborhood".

Redevelopment projects for the neighborhood became the dominant issue of the 1990s, 2000s and 2010s. Efforts include the Bayview Redevelopment Plan for Area B, which includes approximately 1300 acres of existing residential, commercial and industrial lands. This plan identifies seven economic activity nodes within the area. The former Navy Shipyard waterfront property is also the target of redevelopment to include residential, commercial, and recreational areas.

== Geography ==
The Bayview–Hunters Point districts are located in the southeastern part of San Francisco, strung along the main artery of Third Street from India Basin to Candlestick Point. The boundaries are Cesar Chavez Boulevard to the north, U.S. Highway 101 (Bayshore Freeway) to the west, Bayview Hill to the south, and San Francisco Bay to the east. Neighborhoods within the district include Hunters Point, India Basin, Bayview, Silver Terrace, Bret Harte, Islais Creek Estuary and South Basin. The entire southern half of the neighborhood is the Candlestick Point State Recreation Area, including the site of the Candlestick Park stadium, which was demolished in 2015.

== History ==
=== The Ohlone people ===
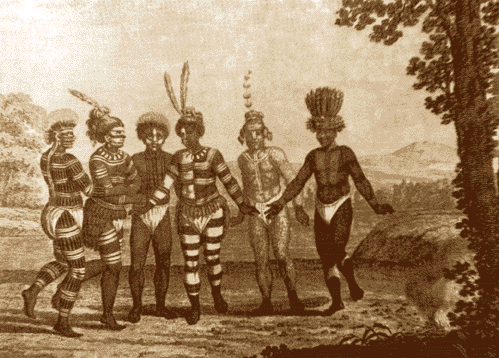
The Ohlone people

Primarily composed of tidal wetlands with some small hills, the area was inhabited by the Yelamu and Ramaytush Ohlone people prior to the arrival of Spanish missionaries in the 1700s. The district consisted of what the Ohlone people called "shell mounds", which were sacred burial grounds. The Spanish called them Costanoans, or "coast dwellers". The land was later colonized in 1775 by Juan Bautista Aguirre, a ship pilot for Captain Juan Manuel de Ayala who named it La Punta Concha (English: Conch Point). Later explorers renamed it Beacon Point. For the next several decades it was used as pasture for cattle run by the Franciscan friars at Mission Dolores.

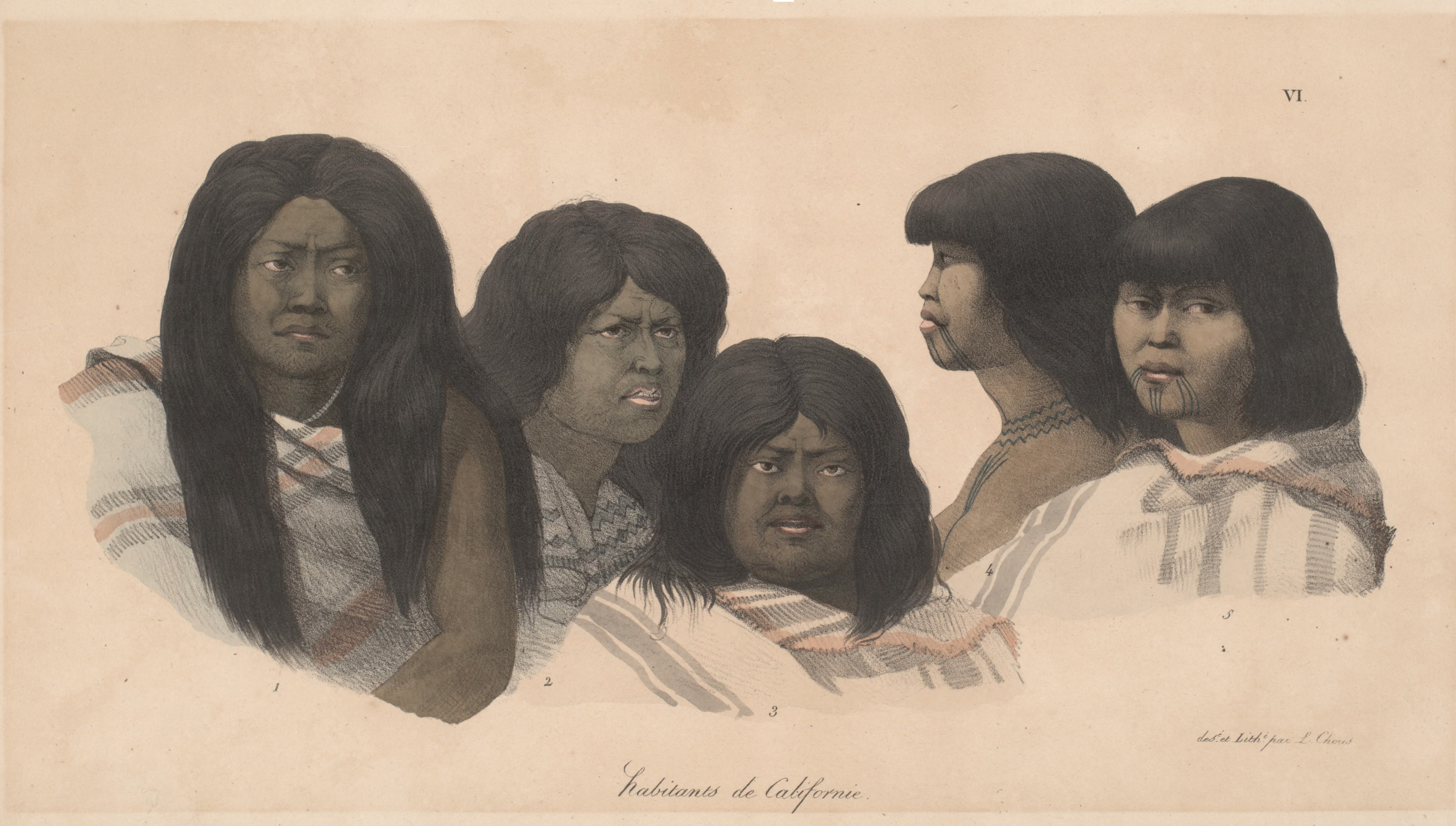
Ohlone women painted by Louis Choris, which reads Habitants de Californie

In 1839, the area was part of the 4,446-acre (17.99 km^{2}) Rancho Rincon de las Salinas y Potrero Viejo Mexican land grant given to José Cornelio Bernal (1796–1842). Following the California Gold Rush, Bernal sold what later became the Bayview–Hunters Point area for real estate development in 1849. Little actual development occurred but Bernal's agents were three brothers, John, Phillip and Robert Hunter, who built their homes and dairy farm on the land (then near the present-day corner of Griffith Street and Oakdale Avenue) and who gave rise to the name Hunters Point. In 1850, Hunter began trying to sell lots in an entirely new city called "South San Francisco" on the peninsula that now bears his name. Physically isolated from the rest of the city by both Mission Bay and the Islais Creek estuary, the only way to get to Hunters Point aside from sailing was via the San Bruno Road, completed in 1858.

The Bayview–Hunters Point district was labelled "Southern San Francisco" on some maps, not to be confused with the city of South San Francisco further to the south.

Islais Creek and "Sacred Sites"

The Muwekma Ohlone held and still hold Islais Creek by 3rd Street and Marin in the Bayview as one of fifty, "sacred sites". Islais Creek and the adjoining bay has been heavily polluted. Of the original approximately 1500 people who inhabited the San Francisco Peninsula prior to the Portola Expedition in 1769, only one lineage is known to have survived. Their descendants form the four branches of the Ramaytush Ohlone peoples today.

=== Industrial development ===
After a San Francisco ordinance in 1868 banned the slaughter and processing of animals within the city proper, a group of butchers established a "butchers reservation" on 81-acre (0.33 km^{2}) of tidal marshland in the Bayview district. Within ten years, 18 slaughterhouses were located in the area along with their associated production facilities for tanning, fertilizer, wool and tallow. The "reservation" (then bounded by present-day Ingalls Street, Third Street, from Islais Creek to Bayshore) and the surrounding houses and businesses became known as Butchertown. By 1888, the city cracked down on the slaughterhouse district due to a diphtheria outbreak and a need for better sanitation. The city inspectors found under the slaughterhouses a foul smell, the decay of animal parts, and live pigs. The butcher industry declined following the 1906 San Francisco earthquake until 1971 when the final slaughterhouse closed.

From 1929 until 2006 the Bayview–Hunters Point district were home for the coal and oil-fired power plants which provided electricity to San Francisco. Smokestack effluvium and byproducts dumped in the vicinity have been cited for health and environmental problems in the neighborhood. In 1994, the San Francisco Energy Company proposed building another power plant in the neighborhood, but community activists protested and pushed to have the current facility shut down. In 2008, Pacific Gas and Electric Company demolished the Hunters Point Power Plant and began a two-year remediation project to restore the land for residential development. The area remains a hub of business along 3rd Street, represented by the Merchants of Butchertown.

=== Shrimping industry ===
From 1870 to the 1930s, shrimping industries developed as Chinese immigrants begin to operate most of the shrimp companies. By the 1930s, there were a dozen shrimp operations in Bayview. In 1939 when the U.S. Navy took over the land under eminent domain for the Naval Shipyard. The Health Department came in and burned the shacks and docks that once provided a small village of fishermen and their families a steady living in the abundant shrimp harvest from the San Francisco Bay.

=== Shipyard ===
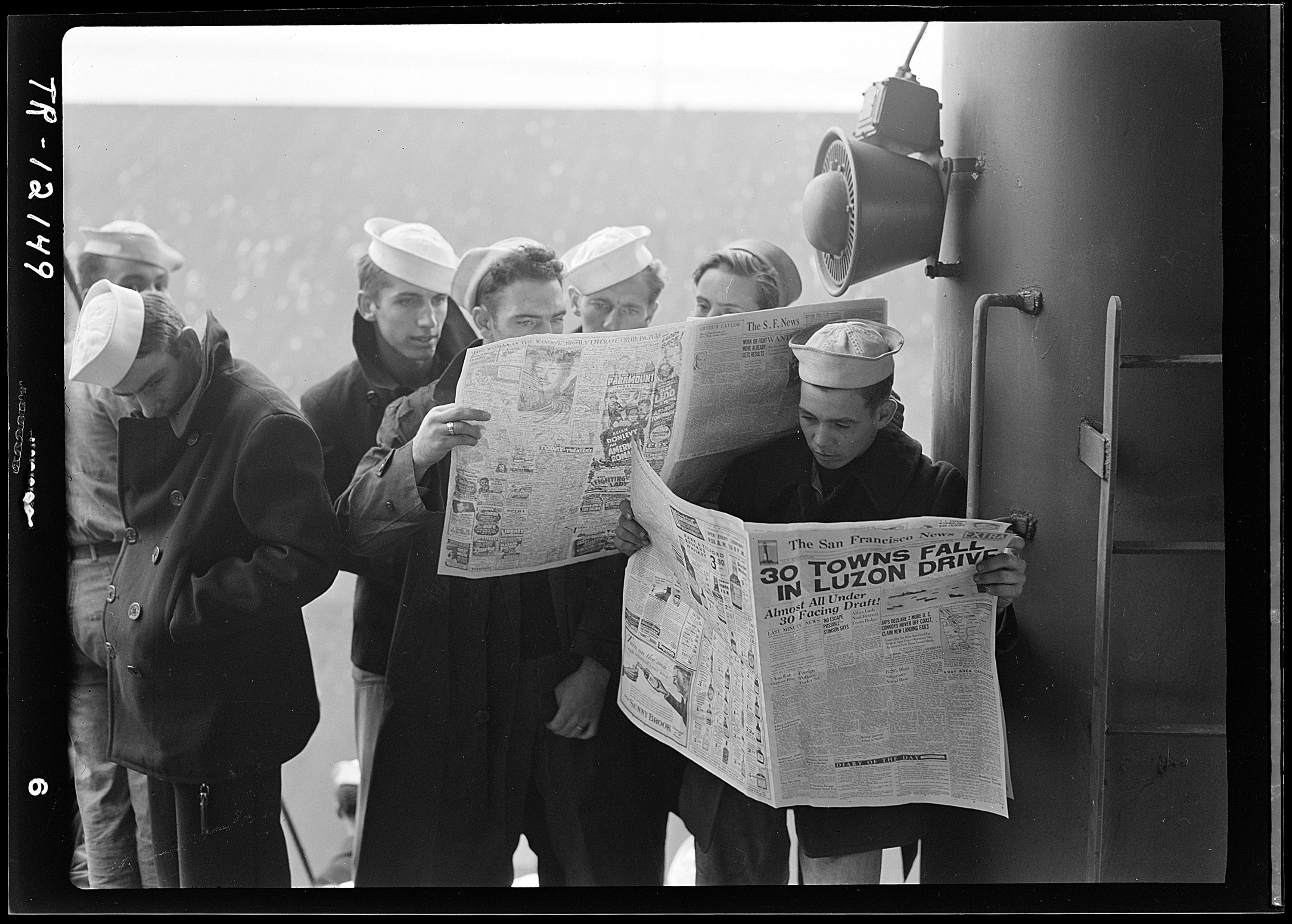
Enlisted men, wounded in battle, on board the USS President Hayes in 1945 at Hunter's Point shipyard

Shipbuilding became integral to Bayview–Hunters Point in 1867 with the construction there of the first permanent drydock on the Pacific coast. The Hunters Point Dry Docks were greatly expanded by Union Iron Works and Bethlehem Shipbuilding Corporation and were capable of housing the largest ships that could pass through the locks of the Panama Canal. World War I increased the contracts there for building Naval vessels and, in 1940, the United States Navy purchased a section of property to develop the San Francisco Naval Shipyard. Beginning in the 1920s, a strong presence of Maltese American immigrants, along with Italian Americans, began populating the Bayview, focused on the local Catholic St. Paul of the Shipwreck Church and the Maltese American Social Club. They were a presence until the 1960s when they began moving into the suburbs.

The shipbuilding industry saw a large influx of blue collar workers into the neighborhood, many of them African Americans taking part in the Great Migration. This migration into Bayview increased substantially after World War II due to racial segregation and eviction of African Americans from homes elsewhere in the city. Between 1940 and 1950, the population of Bayview saw a fourfold increase to 51,000 residents. The Hunter's Point shipyard at its peak employed 17,000 people. One function of HPS was the loading of components of the atomic weapon "Little Boy" that was eventually used on Hiroshima. "Little Boy" was loaded on the USS Indianapolis on July 15, 1945, and is reported to have contained half of the uranium-235 (U-235) available in the United States, valued at the time at $300 million ($4.37 billion in 2018). The USS Indianapolis left Hunters Point at 6:30 am on July 16, 1945, but was not allowed to leave San Francisco's harbor until 8:30 am, after the first atomic weapon test "Trinity" (5:29 am) had been confirmed successful in the New Mexico desert. In 1947, the Hunter's Point crane was constructed at the shipyard to repair battleships. It was the largest crane in the world at the time. The crane still looms large over the neighborhood today.

Until 1969, the Hunters Point shipyard was the site of the Naval Radiological Defense Laboratory (NRDL). The NRDL decontaminated ships exposed to atomic weapons testing and also researched the effects of radiation on materials and living organisms. This caused widespread radiological contamination and, in 1989, the base was declared a Superfund site requiring long-term clean-up. The Navy closed the shipyard and Naval base in 1994. The Base Realignment and Closure program manages various pollution remediation projects.

==== Environmental impact report ====
On January 10, 2010, Ohlone representatives, Ann Marie Sayers, Corrina Gould, Charlene Sul, and Carmen Sandoval, Ohlone Profiles Project, American Indian Movement West and International Indian Treaty Council penned a letter to then mayor of San Francisco, Gavin Newsom, about preserving the Ohlone historical sites at the Candlestick Point–Hunters Point shipyard stating "This is an important opportunity to work together to protect these ancient historical sites, honor our ancestors and insure that development pressures do not further damage critical Ohlone Indigenous sites, the sites affected by the development are extremely significant and are believed to be burial or ceremonial sites, in addition to protecting these sites, we also want to work with the local community to protect their health, the land and the fragile Bay marine environment."

On June 12, 2014, Vice published an article on the history, environmental bigotry and radiation effects on the residents of the neighborhood.

=== Italian, Portuguese, and Maltese community development ===
Upon late 1800s settlement, there were many Italian, Maltese, and Portuguese home-builders, ranchers and truck farmers in the Bayview from 1890 to 1910. The growing population of Italian, Maltese, and Portuguese residents seemingly pushed out the early Chinese community that was located in the Bayview.

=== African-American community development ===
==== Redlining reports ====
In the 1930s, the distribution of race and income in the neighborhood was fairly even. Two redlining reports from this time characterize the residential makeup of the area as lower-income: that is, residents were either "white collar" workers or factory laborers who had jobs in the vicinity. While "many of the inhabitants [were] from foreign extraction, no racial problem [was] presented." Poverty in the neighborhood was widely attributed to the depression. In 1937, the Home Owner's Loan Corporation made a redlining map to determine which San Francisco neighborhoods should receive loans for mortgages and general housing investment. Two districts in the Bayview Hunters Point received the two lowest possible grades. This lack of investment made it much harder for the area to rebound from the depression, and also made it very difficult for people trying to purchase new homes in the area. In 1942, to address the housing shortage issue, the federal government built 5,500 'temporary' housing units in the area for the families of shipyard workers. As a result, Hunters Point began as one of the most integrated areas in the city. Toward the end of WWII, the San Francisco Housing Authority pushed for the hiring of an all-white police force to govern the neighborhood. Many of the officers were recruited from the segregated south. From this point onwards, racial discrimination – in terms of the environment, housing, employment, and policing – shaped the development of the Bayview Hunters Point and further contributed to its segregation from the rest of the city.

By the 1950s and 1960s, the Bayview was a predominantly African-American neighborhood that housed a movie theater along the Third Street corridor, as well as a library, a gymnasium at the time, Cub scouts through "Rec and Park" as well as youth baseball teams such as "The Blue Diamonds" of Innes [Street].

==== Racial tensions ====
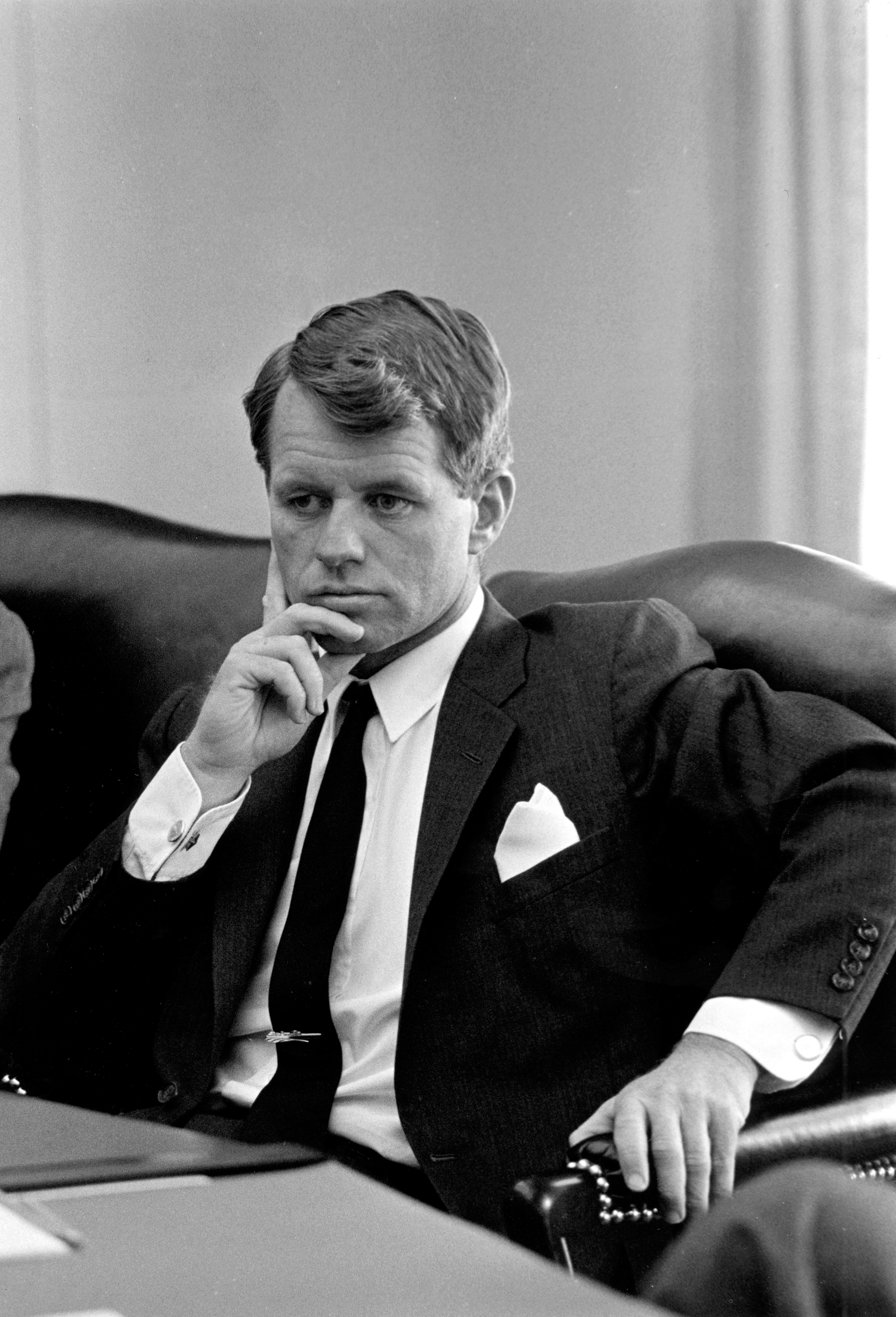
Robert F. Kennedy visited the Bayview in 1967 to discuss poverty with activist Ruth Williams of the Big Five of Bayview.

By the 1960s, the Bayview and Hunters Point neighborhoods were populated predominantly by African-Americans and other racial minorities, and the area was isolated from the rest of San Francisco. Pollution, substandard housing, declining infrastructure, limited employment and racial discrimination were notable problems. James Baldwin documented the marginalization of the community in a 1963 documentary, "Take This Hammer", stating, "this is the San Francisco America pretends does not exist." On September 27, 1966, a race riot occurred at Hunters Point, sparked by the killing of a 16-year-old fleeing from a police officer. The policeman, Alvin Johnson, stated he "caught [a couple of kids] red-handed with a stolen car" and ordered Matthew Johnson to stop, firing several warning shots before fatally shooting Johnson. In 1967 US Senators Robert F. Kennedy, George Murphy and Joseph S. Clark visited the Western Addition and Bayview-Hunters Point neighborhoods accompanied by future mayor Willie Brown to speak to activist Ruth Williams about the inequalities occurring in the Bayview. Closure of the naval shipyard, shipbuilding facilities and de-industrialization of the district in the 1970s and 1980s increased unemployment and local poverty levels.

Building projects to revitalize the district began in earnest in the 1990s and the 2000s. As in the rest of the city, housing prices rose 342% between 1996 and 2008. Many long-time African American residents, whether they could no longer afford to live there or sought to take advantage of their homes' soaring values, left what they perceived as an unsafe neighborhood and made an exodus to the Bay Area's outer suburbs. Once considered a historic African American district, the percentage of black people in the Bayview–Hunters Point population declined from 65 percent in 1990 to a minority in 2000. Despite the decline, the 2010 U.S. Census shows the African American population in the Bayview to be greater in number than that of any other ethnicity.

In the 2000s, the neighborhood became the focus of several redevelopment projects. The MUNI T-Third Street light-rail project was built through the neighborhood, replacing an aging bus line with several new stations, street lamps and landscaping. Lennar proposed a $2-billion project to build 10,500 homes, including rentals, and commercial spaces atop the former Hunters Point Naval Shipyard, and a new football stadium for the San Francisco 49ers, and a shopping complex for Candlestick Point. The stadium would reinvigorate the district, but the 49ers changed their focus to Santa Clara in 2006. Bids for the 2016 Summer Olympics in San Francisco that included plans to build an Olympic Village in Bayview–Hunters Point was also dropped. Lennar proposed to build the stadium without the football team. Local community activist groups have criticized much of the redevelopment for displacing rather than benefiting existing neighborhood residents.

== Education ==
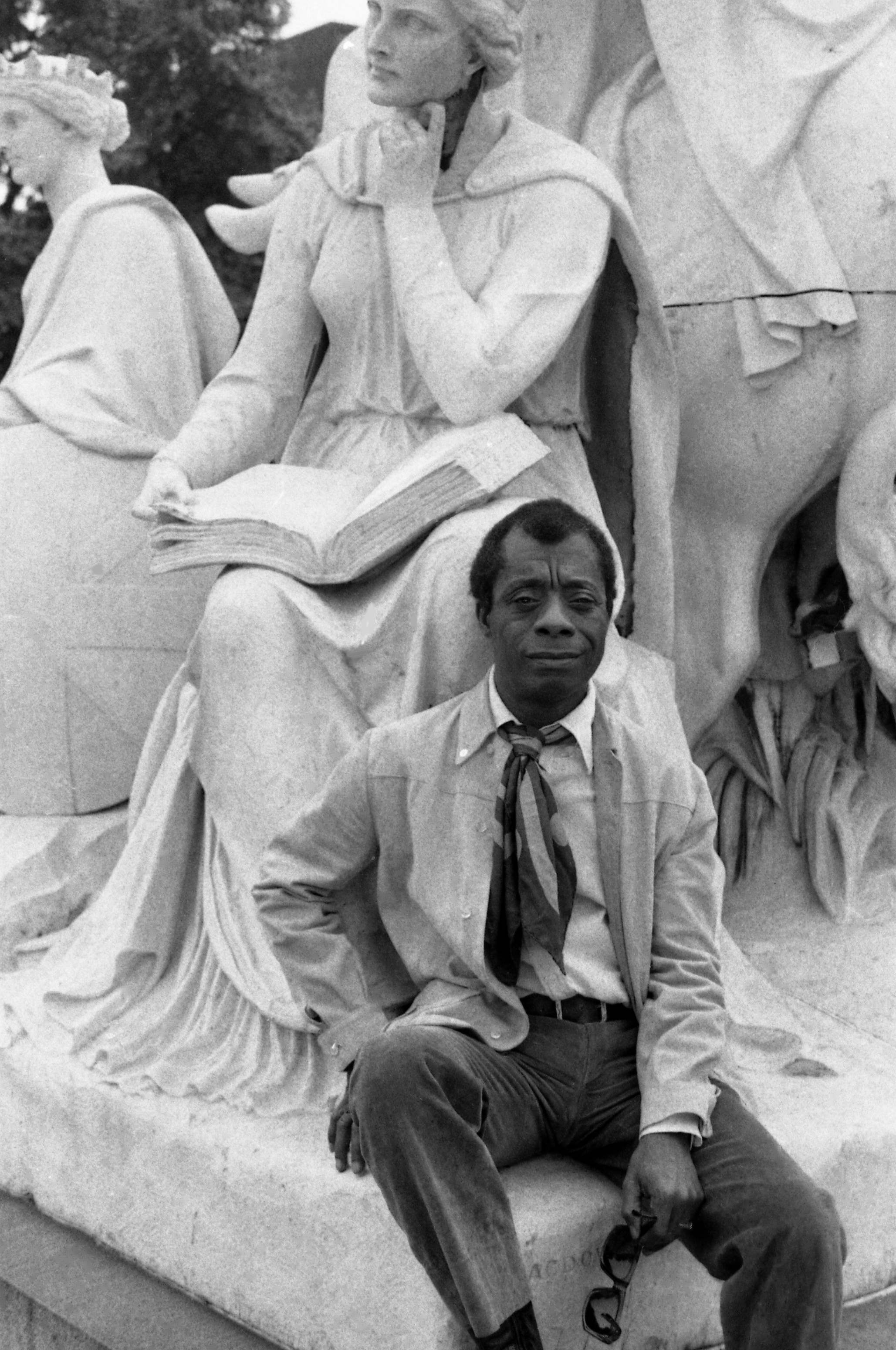
James Baldwin visited the Bayview to speak with the youth.

The Bayview, a historically predominant black neighborhood, is home to more elementary school-age students than any other neighborhood in the city and combined with the Mission and Excelsior, houses a quarter of all students in the district. Schools in the Bayview have suffered from declining enrollment for the past two decades. Out of the 6,000 students who live in the Bayview, more than 70% choose to attend school outside of their neighborhood. In 2016, in attendance with Jonathan Garcia, Adonal Foyle and Theo Ellington, Willie L. Brown middle school in Bayview-Hunter's Point commemorated the unveiling of the new Golden State Warrior outside basketball court at the school, donated by the Warriors Community Foundation. Bayview-Hunter's Point has several elementary and middle schools, one high school and has two college campuses. The schools include:

=== Elementary and early enrichment ===
- Whitney Young Development Center (now FACES SF)
- Erikson School (K)
- Frandelja Enrichment Center Fairfax
- Frandelja Enrichment center Gilman
- Success Daycare
- Bret Harte elementary school
- George Washington Carver elementary school
- Hunters Point Number Two School
- Charles R. Drew Elementary School
- Leola M. Havard Early Education School
- Malcolm X Academy

=== Middle and junior high schools ===
- Joshua Marie Cameron Academy
- KIPP Bayview Academy
- Willie L. Brown Jr. Middle School
- One Purpose School (K–12)
- Thurgood Marshall High School
- Rise University Preparatory

=== High schools ===
- One Purpose School (K–12)
- Thurgood Marshall High School
- KIPP San Francisco College Preparatory
- Joshua Marie Cameron Academy (7–12)
- Coming Of Age Christian Academy (K–12)

=== Colleges ===
- City College of San Francisco – Evans Center
- City College of San Francisco – Oakdale Center

=== After school programs ===
- YMCA – Bayview
- College Track
- Young Community Developers (YCD)
- Faces SF – Bayview
- City of Dreams

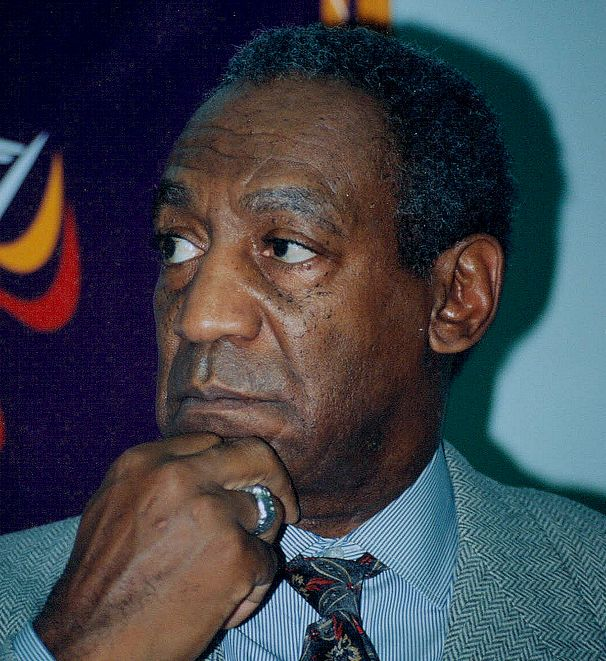
Bill Cosby visited Charles R. Drew Elementary in the Bayview during the 2000s, where he scolded the school, families and community alike.

In 2004 Bill Cosby visited Charles Drew Elementary School in Bayview-Hunters Point, where he railed against students and parents, criticizing them by saying "they must invest in their children's education before they wind up teenage moms, jail inmates, drug dealers—or dead." In his speech—which was a topic of debate on conservative talk radio, on cable TV networks and in African American neighborhoods—Cosby lambasted low-income blacks for spending $500 on their children's shoes, but not spending $250 on the educational tool Hooked on Phonics. He furthered his statements by saying "I am talking about these people who cry when their son is standing there in an orange suit," he said in May. "Where were you when he was 2? Where were you when he was 12? Where were you when he was 18, and how come you didn't know that he had a pistol? And where is the father? ... You can't keep saying that God will find a way. God is tired of you." He derided African Americans for wearing saggy pants, speaking improper English and giving children names "like Shaniqua, Shaligua, Mohammed and all that crap." Then-San Francisco schools chief Arlene Ackerman wrote a letter to Cosby shortly after the speech, inviting him to visit one of her three new "Dream Schools", low-performing public schools overhauled to include long school days, Saturday school, mandatory student uniforms, a more rigorous curriculum and required contracts signed by parents pledging to be involved in their children's education.

After his visit, Cosby praised the school, but he stressed that it was parents—not just the schools themselves—who needed to step up to ensure their children beat the statistics. "Parents are 99 percent," he said. "School districts don't parent. They teach."

In 2017, mentorship nonprofit Friends of the Children received a four-year $1.2 million grant from the Social Innovation Fund, which will allow the national program to expand into San Francisco's Bayview and Hunters Point neighborhoods. Friends of the Children provides long-term mentorship opportunities for children from kindergarten through high school. After 24 years of evaluation, the program was proven to increase high school graduation rates, decrease teen pregnancy, and reduce juvenile justice involvement.

== Demographics ==
According to the 2010 U.S. Census, Bayview–Hunters Point (ZIP 94124) had a population of 33,996, an increase of 826 from 2000. The census data showed the single-race racial composition of Bayview–Hunters Point was 33.7% African-American, 30.7% Asian (22.1% Chinese, 3.1% Filipino, 2.9% Vietnamese, 0.4% Cambodian, 0.3% Indian, 0.2% Burmese, 0.2% Korean, 0.2% Japanese, 0.2% Pakistani, 0.1% Laotian), 12.1% White, 3.2% Native Hawaiian or Pacific Islander (2.4% Samoan, 0.1% Tongan, 0.1% Native Hawaiian), 0.7% Native American, 15.1% other, and 5.1% mixed race. Of Bayview's population, 24.9% was of Hispanic or Latino origin, of any race (11.5% Mexican, 4.2% Salvadoran, 2.6% Guatemalan, 1.4% Honduran, 1.4% Nicaraguan, 0.7% Puerto Rican, 0.2% Peruvian, 0.2% Spanish, 0.2% Spaniard, 0.1% Colombian, 0.1% Cuban, 0.1% Panamanian).

According to the 2010 U.S. Census, Bayview–Hunters Point had the highest percentage of African-Americans among San Francisco neighborhoods, home to 21.5% of the city's Black population, and they were the predominant ethnic group in the Bayview. Census figures showed the percentage of African-Americans in Bayview declined from 48% in 2000 to 33.7% in 2010, while the percentage of Asian and White ethnicity increased from 24% and 10%, respectively, to 30.7% and 12.1%. However the eastern part of the neighborhood had a population of 12,308 and is still roughly 53% African-American.

According to the 2005–2009 American Community Survey (ACS), the Bayview district is estimated to have 10,540 housing units and an estimated owner-occupancy rate of 51%. The 2010 U.S. Census indicates the number of households to be 9,717, of which 155 belong to same-sex couples. Median home values were estimated in 2009 to be $586,201, but that has since fallen dramatically to around $367,000 in 2011, the lowest of any of San Francisco's ZIP code areas. Median Household Income was estimated in 2009 at $43,155. Rent prices in the Bayview remain relatively low, by San Francisco standards, with over 50% of rents paid in 2009 at less than $750/mo.

A recent Brookings Institution report identified Hunters Point as one of five Bay Area "extreme poverty" neighborhoods, in which over 40% of the inhabitants live below the Federal poverty level of an income of $22,300 for a family of four. Nearly 12% of the population in the Bayview receives public assistance income, three times the national average, and more than double the state average. While the Bayview has a higher percentage of the population receiving either Social Security or retirement income than the state or national averages, the dollar amounts that these people receive is less than the averages in either the state or the nation.

== Marginalization ==
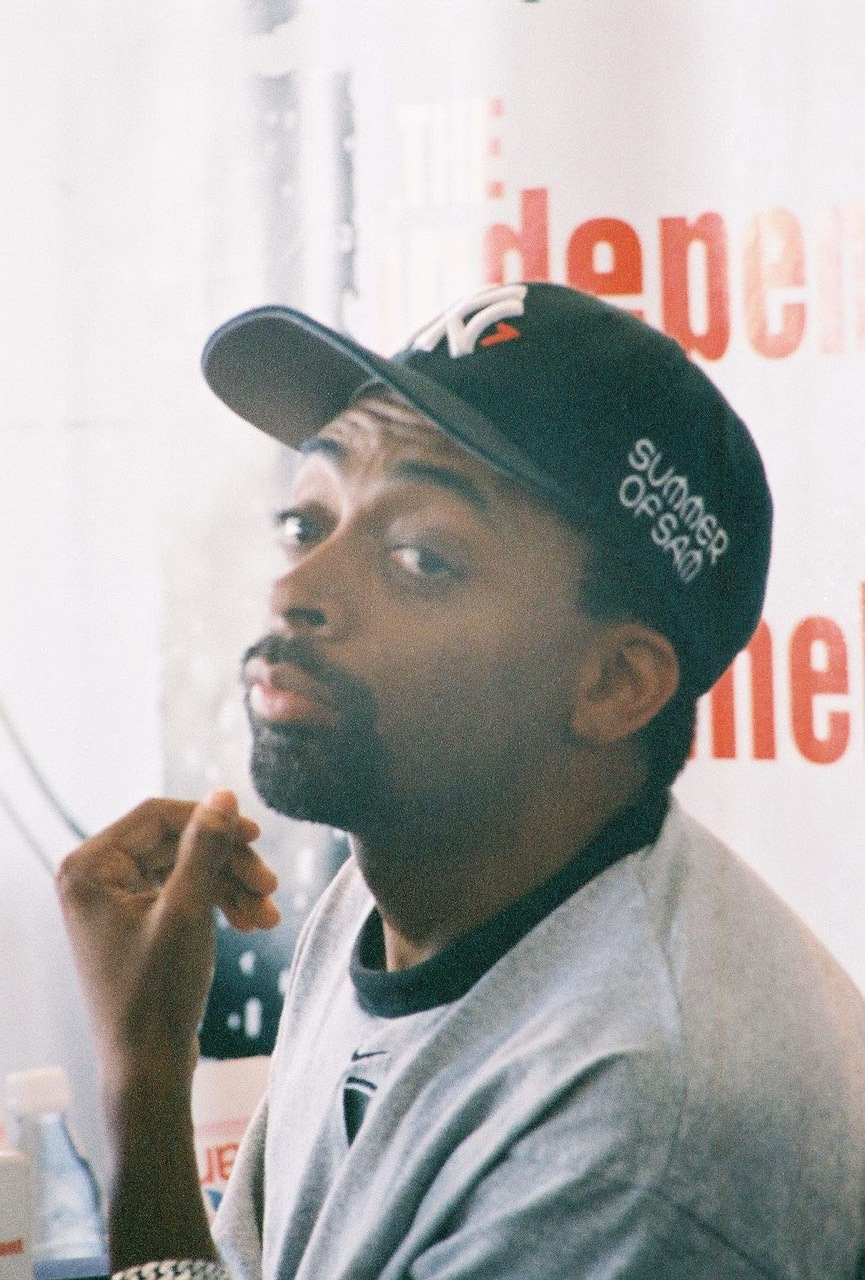
Film director Spike Lee's film Sucker Free City focused on elements of poverty of the Bayview.

Since the 1960s, the Bayview–Hunters Point community has been cited as a significant example of marginalization. In 2011, it remained "one of the most economically disadvantaged areas of San Francisco". Root causes include a working class populace historically segregated to the outskirts of the city, high levels of industrial pollution, the closure of industry, and loss of infrastructure. The results have been high rates of unemployment, poverty, disease and crime. Attempts to mitigate the effects of marginalization include the city's building of the Third Street light-rail line, establishment of the Southeast Community Facility (SECF) as a response from the SF Public Utilities Commission to a community-led effort to balance environmental injustice associated with public utilities, the Southeast Food Access Workgroup, initially formed by the SF Department of Public Health as part of the SF Mayor's ShapeUp SF health initiative, and implementation of enhanced local hiring policy that recognizes that regulations requiring hiring for public projects prioritize City residents and contractors may not help specific neighborhoods where job seekers and contractors may still be overlooked. Place-based and asset-based community building programs networked through the Quesada Gardens Initiative began in 2002 adding direct grassroots public participation to the social and environmental change landscape with a goal of preserving diversity and encouraging longterm residents to reinvest in their neighborhood.

The Hunter's Point shipyard's toxic waste pollution has been cited for elevated rates of asthma and other respiratory diseases among residents. These adverse health effects coupled with rising housing costs contribute to what one community member and organizer has characterized as behavior "meeting the UN standard definition of genocide".

Gang and drug activity, as well as a high murder rate, have plagued the Bayview–Hunters Point district. A 2001 feature article in the San Francisco Chronicle cited feuding between small local gangs as the major cause of the area's unsolved homicides. In 2011, The New York Times described Bayview as "one of the city's most violent" neighborhoods. Police have made the removal of guns from the streets their top priority in recent years, leading to a 20% decline in major crimes between 2010 and 2011, including declines of 35% in homicides, 22% in aggravated assaults, 38% in arson, 30% in burglary, 34% in theft, 23% in auto theft, and 39% in robbery. Lesser crimes have also declined by about 24% over the past year. As of 2018, crime rates in the area are 161% higher compared to the national average. Auto theft averaged around 10 break-ins a day as of 2020.

=== Food Desert and Food Swamp ===
The USDA defines a food desert as a region without access to nutritious, affordable and quality whole foods. Food deserts are areas with a 20 percent or greater poverty rate and where a third of residents live more than a mile from a supermarket, farmers market or local grocery store. In the "grocery gap", researchers from Food Trust found African Americans are 400 percent more likely to live in a community that lacks a full-service supermarket.

Until the late 2000s the neighborhood had no chain supermarkets. In 2011, a San Francisco official described the area as "a food desert – an area with limited access to affordable, nutritious food like fresh produce at a full-size grocery store." A large swath of the southeast sector of San Francisco sits within a Federally recognized food desert. A Home Depot was approved by the city to be built in the area, but Home Depot abandoned its plans following the Great Recession. Lowe's took over Home Depot's plans, and in 2010 opened their first store in San Francisco on the Bayshore Blvd. site. In August 2011, UK supermarket chain Tesco, owner of Fresh and Easy stores, opened Bayview–Hunters Point's first new grocery store in 20 years, though this store has closed as part of Fresh and Easy's larger corporate exit from the United States.

The neighborhood was the subject of a 2003 documentary, Straight Outta Hunters Point, directed by lifelong Hunters Point resident Kevin Epps, and a 2012 sequel, "Straight Outta Hunters Point 2", movies that expose the daily drama of gang-related wars plaguing a community already fighting for social and economic survival. The Spike Lee film Sucker Free City used Hunters Point as a backdrop for a story on gentrification and street gangs. In 2002, the Quesada Gardens Initiative began with two people planting flowers and vegetables where space allotted; now there are 3,500 members who volunteer. At last count, Quesada Gardens Initiative produced 10,000 pounds of fruits and vegetables in a year. The transformation has also been slow but steady.

In 2011 Hunters Point was labelled as one of the United States' top 9 worst food deserts; in that same year the Bayview District welcomed Fresh & Easy, an upstart grocery chain owned by British food giant Tesco. The Bayview location delivered weak sales, but it was hardly alone: Tesco sold most of the stores and closed the rest in 2013, and the chain soon disappeared into bankruptcy. The store sat empty for a few years while former Supervisor Malia Cohen worked with former mayor Mayor Ed Lee and the Office of Economic and Workforce Development (OEWD) on finding a new owner. They landed on Howard and Amanda Ngo. With a $250,000 investment from OEWD and $4.1 million from the Small Business Administration, the couple hosted the grand opening for their second Duc Loi's Pantry at 5800 Third Street in 2016. But the store closed in 2019 due to a range of factors.

In October 2021 it was made public that a first-of-its-kind "food empowerment market" would be placed in at Third and McKinnon where the former Doc Loi Pantry and Fresh & Easy grocery store had been. The idea is a community market that would distribute donated or subsidized food—but unlike a food bank, eligible shoppers would be able to pick and choose their own groceries and either pay for the goods at a subsidized price or obtain them for free. The market would also host an on-site community kitchen focusing on culinary education and offer free delivery service for seniors and those with mobility issues. The Food Empowerment Market idea stems from legislation introduced by District 11 Supervisor Ahsha Safai that allocates $1.5 million in startup funds from the Human Service Agency to establish the model for the new market in partnership with a yet-to-be-named neighborhood nonprofit. Bayview-Hunters Point has the highest rates of obesity in San Francisco with less than five percent of food sold in the neighborhood consisting of fresh produce. The neighborhood also has the most residents (mainly seniors) facing food insecurity than anywhere else in the city, according to a report from the San Francisco Department of Public Health.

District 10 supervisor Shamann Walton supports the idea, stating it would provide residents with unprecedented healthy choices, and that he's hopeful The City will get behind any deal struck between the current owners of the vacant space and the Human Services Agency. This project would really focus on seniors and families as well, Latino and Black seniors are twice as likely to be food insecure in San Francisco, according to The City's COVID-19 Command Center report. Many of them live in Bayview-Hunters Point and historically have low rates of enrollment in distribution and food delivery programs, making them hard to reach. Families experience the risks of living in a food desert early and intensely. Nearly 27% of pregnant Latina mothers and 20% of Black mothers in San Francisco do not know where their next healthy meal is coming from. Children from those same families are also the most likely to consume fast food than their white peers. Any and all efforts to combat food insecurity should focus on seniors and families, two groups especially vulnerable to food insecurity, advocates and officials say. Doing so does not just make for healthier communities, it starts down the path toward ensuring equity in opportunity and access for all residents.

=== Community activism ===
In April 1968, baseball icon, hall-of-fame inductee, and San Francisco Giants legend Willie Mays and Osceola Washington campaigned for "Blacks and Whites Together Fund Drive for Youth Activities this Summer. Bayview-Hunters Point Neighborhood Community Center."

A number of community groups, such as the India Basin Neighborhood Association, the Quesada Gardens Initiative, Literacy for Environmental Justice, the Bayview Merchants' Association, the Bayview Footprints Collaboration of Community-Building Groups, and Greenaction for Health and Environmental Justice work with community members, other organizations and citywide agencies to strengthen, improve, and fight for the protection of this diverse part of San Francisco.

Community gardening, art, and social history are popular in the area. The Quesada Gardens Initiative is a well recognized organization that has created a cluster of 35 community and backyard gardens in the heart of the neighborhood, including the original Quesada Garden on the 1700 block of Quesada Ave., the Founders' Garden, Bridgeview Teaching and Learning Garden (which won the 2011 Neighborhood Empowerment Network's "Best Green Community Project Award", Krispy Korners, the Latona Community Garden, and the new Palou Community Garden. Major public art pieces honor unique hyper-local history, grassroots involvement, and the right of communities to define themselves.

=== Redevelopment ===
==== Linda Brooks-Burton Library ====
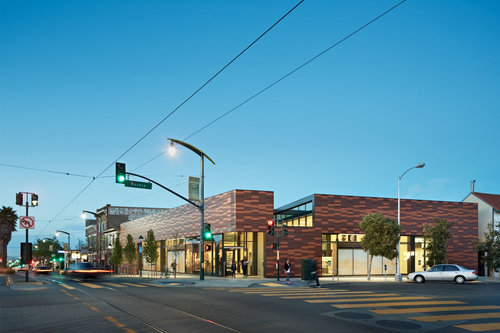
The Bayview Linda Brooks-Burton Library remodel seen in the 2010s

The original Bayview branch library was opened as a storefront facility in 1927, replacing a "library station" that had been established in 1921. In February 1969, a new building designed by John S. Bolles & Associates was constructed on the corner of 3rd Street and Revere Avenue. Its formal dedication took place on July 12. Anna E. Waden, a municipal clerical employee, donated a gift of $185,700 to put towards the new library, which was then named after her. The library was rebuilt on the same site for $13.5 million and reopened on February 23, 2013. It is LEED certified. The building cladding is also inspired by African textile designs. In the building's outside atrium are west African Adinkra symbols. The library was renamed in honor of late librarian Linda Brooks-Burton in 2015.

Linda Brooks-Burton, born and raised in the Bayview, worked at the library branch for 30 years, including serving 15 years as managing librarian. She co-founded the Bayview History Preservation Project in 2007, which digitally archived histories of Black migration to the Hunters Point Shipyard, as well as other local history and culture. She also co-founded the Bayview Footprints Network of Community Building Groups in 2008, which empowered community groups to tell Bayview's history online. She also served on the Bayview community boards of the Whitney Young Child Development Center (now FACES SF), the Healing Arts Youth Center, all six branches in the South East. Brooks-Burton died on September 19, 2013, from a sudden heart attack and residents called for the branch to be named in her honor. Library officials said Brooks-Burton called her the quiet champion behind the effort to build a new branch library in the Bayview.

==== Redevelopment of Hunters Point Naval Shipyard and environmental racism ====
In 2016, Tetra Tech, the firm in charge of overseeing the cleanup of toxic material on the naval base, was charged with negligence. In response, the Navy was forced to momentarily cease transferring shipyard land to Lennar for redevelopment. Hunters Point Naval Shipyard was a redevelopment project being spearheaded by Lennar on the 702 acres at Candlestick Point and the San Francisco Naval Shipyard. The plan called for 10,500 residential units, a new stadium to replace Candlestick Park, 3,700,000 square feet (340,000 m^{2}) of commercial and retail space, an 8,000- to 10,000-square-foot (930 m^{2}) arena; artists' village and 336 acres of waterfront park and recreational area. The developers said the project would contribute up to 12,000 permanent jobs and 13,000 induced jobs.

The approval process required developers to address concerns of area residents and San Francisco government officials. Criticism of the project focused on the large-scale toxic clean-up of the industrial superfund site, environmental impact of waterfront construction, displacement of an impoverished neighborhood populace and a required build-up to solve transportation needs.

In July 2010, Lennar received initial approval of an Environmental Impact Report from San Francisco supervisors. In September 2011, the court denied the transfer of property to Lennar prior to clean-up of contamination. Per a letter sent from the EPA to the Navy, the process was placed on hold until "the actual potential public exposure to radioactive material at and near" the shipyard can be "clarified".

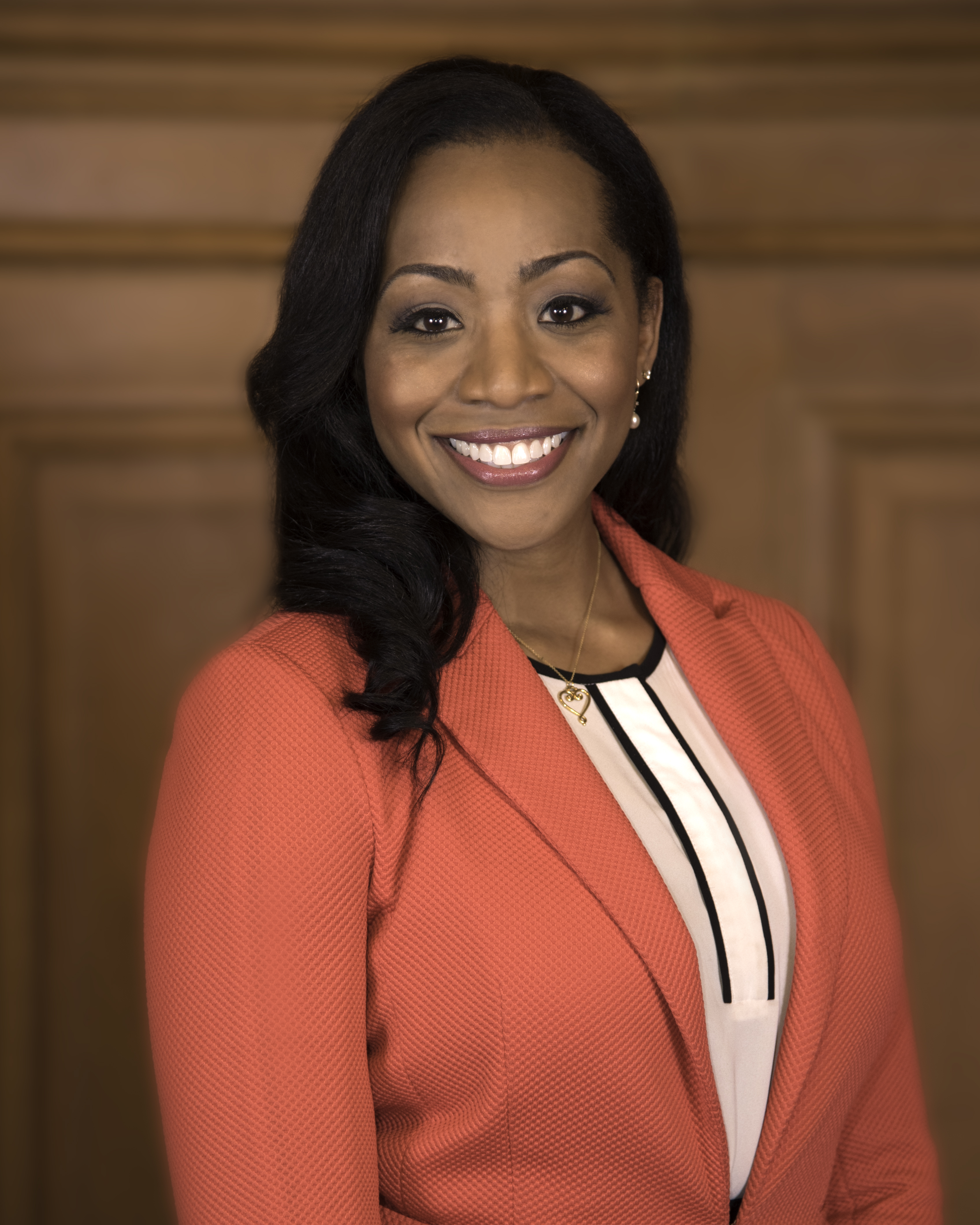
Bayview D10 Supervisor Malia Cohen elected in 2010

==== "I am Bayview" campaign ====
Partnered with the office of Supervisor of District 10 Malia Cohen and Bayview Underground, I am Bayview helmed by creative George McCalman and photographer Jason Madara created a series of images of photographed community members to visually communicate gentrification. George states that if "one is going to move into a neighborhood, you should get to know the people who live there, not simply displace an existing community. Gentrification is a hot button issue in San Francisco. This was our visual response. Twenty-nine posters are now installed along the 3rd Street corridor of the Dogpatch and Bayview, capturing the Bayview residents who represent their neighborhood proudly."

I am Bayview has also been subject to criticism as some Bayview- and San Franciscan-born people felt it promoted the gentrification of the neighborhood.

==== Pan-African flags ====
In 2017, Supervisor Malia Cohen and the city of San Francisco "tagged" Third Street poles with red, black and green stripes in honor of Black History Month and to honor Black residents' heritage in Bayview–Hunters Point. Cohen issued a statement explaining the reasoning behind the painting: "The intention of painting the flagpoles is to create a unifying cultural marker for the Bayview, in the same vein as the Italian flags painted on poles in North Beach, the designation of Calle 24 in the Mission and the bilingual street signs and gates upon entering Chinatown. This is about branding the Bayview neighborhood to honor and pay respect to the decades of contributions that African-Americans have made to the southeast neighborhood and to the city. It's also beautification for the streetscape." Many neighbors were pleased to see the tribute to African-Americans' community legacy. Several early risers in the community took photos of the poles being painted, expressing their gratitude to Cohen.

== Healthcare ==
Bayview-based birth business, SisterWeb founded by Marna Armstead provides support resources for a wide range of maternal support for individuals before and after birth. They also provide mothers with information and support throughout pregnancy and childbirth as well as advocate for mothers' needs to practitioners. SisterWeb's clients typically begin working with doulas by early in the third trimester of pregnancy through the first six weeks after birth. Former San Francisco Supervisor Malia Cohen, who represented the Bayview, was researching health disparities in birth outcomes for black women after conversations she had with her younger sister and one of her legislative aides, both of whom were pregnant at the time.

Cohen's research led her to SisterWeb, which aims to train black, Pacific Islander and Spanish-speaking doulas before matching them with women in their respective communities in San Francisco.

== Arts and technology ==
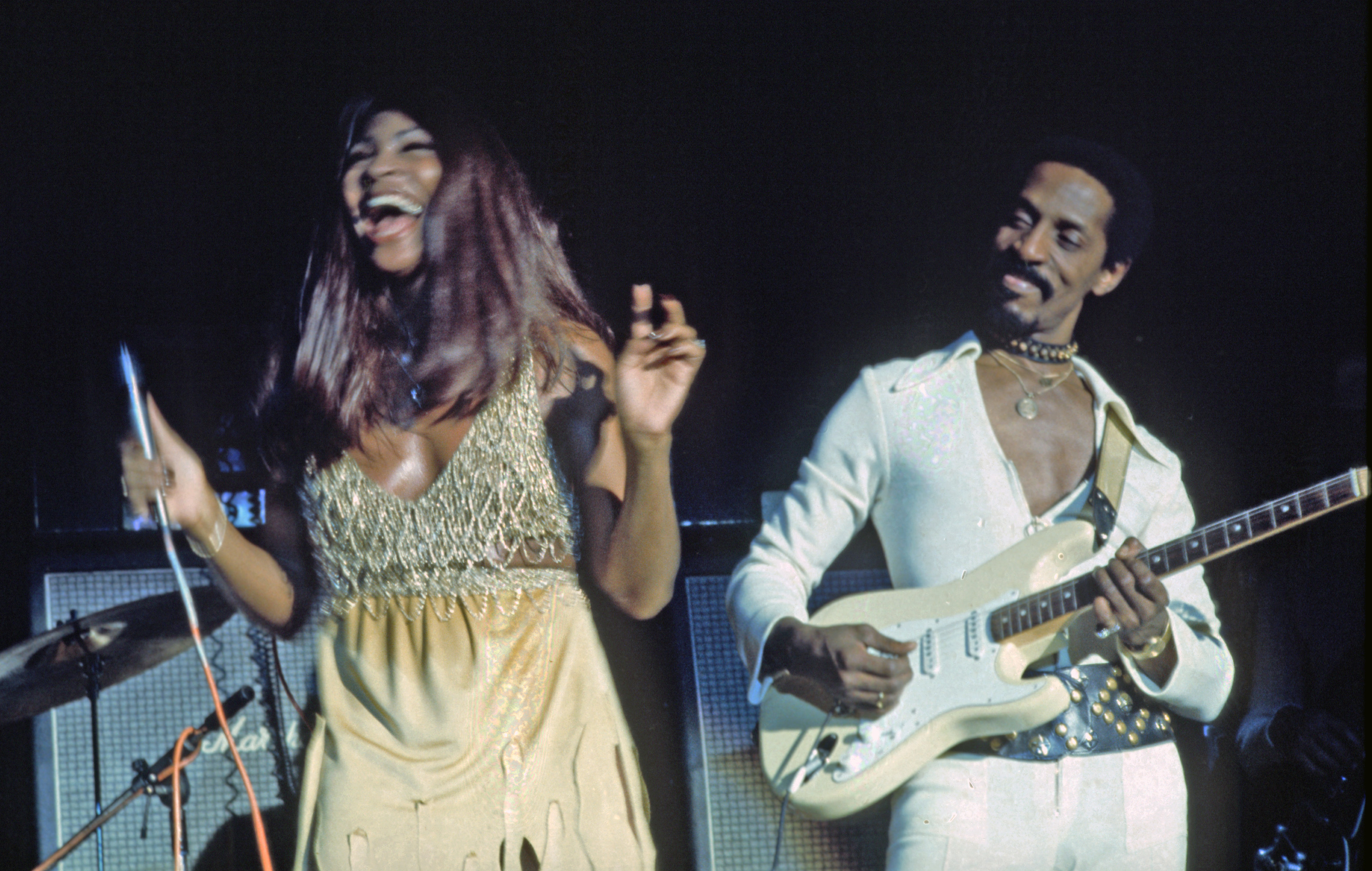
Ike and Tina Turner performing in Hamburg, 1972. The couple performed at Club Long Island during their early years on Third Street.

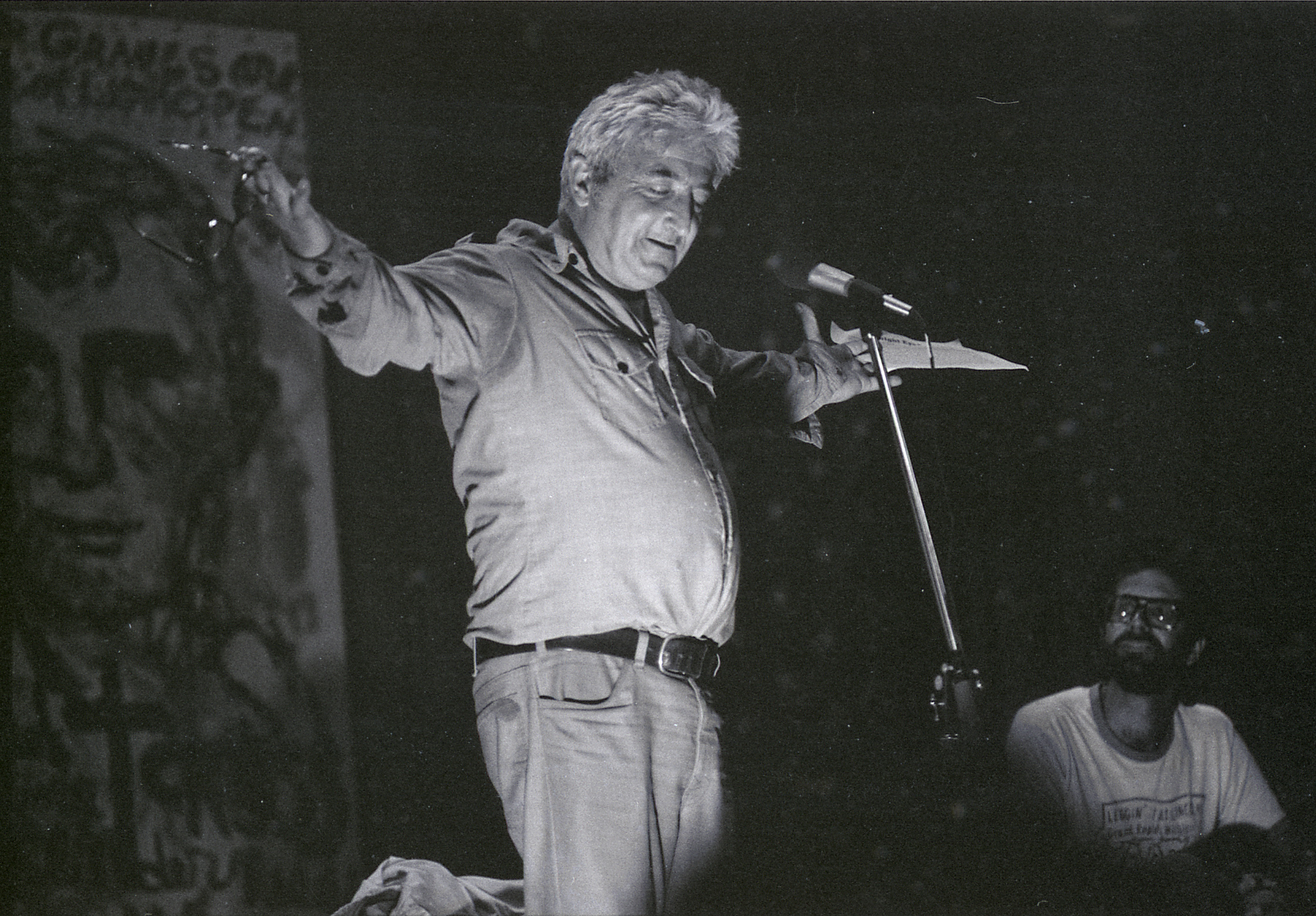
Micheline in 1982

The Bayview has also been a quiet hub for the arts since 1957 and technology going back as far as 1984. Acts such as Ike and Tina Turner performed at the former Club Long Island located on what is now Third & McKinnon.

=== METRAe BaHu ===
Operating from 1987 to 1998, BaHu Gallery was a free-space, non-commercial art gallery and installation location in Bayview-Hunters Point (BaHu). BaHu was the second location for the exhibition spaces sponsored by METRAe, originally located in SOMA. The first METRAe show in 1984 featured beat poet Jack Micheline in a below ground, basement workshop. During the METRAe BaHu period, dozens of artists were provided display areas, receptions open to the public, etc. An inaugural show with multi-media artist S. Scott Davis III was curated by artist Dewey Crumpler, whose own work can be seen on the exterior of the Joe Lee Gym in Bayview Town Center. Over the 10-year period, participating artists included: Rene Yung, Susan Hersey, Tony Calkins, William Pattengill, Topher Delany, Jessica Bodner, Jack Freeman, and many others.

=== Sculptures in Bayview ===
In the Bayview, there are eighteen recorded sculptures across the neighborhood. They are:

- Invocation by Pepe Ozan
- SRL by Survival Research Laboratory
- Ship Shape-Shifting Time by Nobuho Nagasawa
- Copra Cane
- Islais Sculpture by Cliff Garten
- Heron's Head Park Sculpture by Macchiarini Creative Design
- Time to Dream by Amana Johnson
- Sundial by Jaques Overhoff
- Big Fish by William Wareham
- Headless
- Ndebele by Fran Martin
- Bone Wall
- The Butterfly Girl by Jason Webster
- Gigantry by Matthew Passmore
- Nautica Swing by Matthew Gellar
- Bayview Horn by Jerry Ross Barish
- Hale Konon (Ohlone Canoe) by Jessica Bodner

=== Murals in Bayview ===
In the 1980s an artist named Brooke Fancher's mural titled "Tazuri Watu" was commissioned and completed in 1987, "Tazuri Watu" has covered the side of a building located at the intersection of 3rd and Palou for three decades. Over time, the historical work of art had faded, and vandals have defaced portions of it. Earl Shaddix, executive director of Economic Development on Third, called for its restoration. Shaddix applied for a $25,000 grant from the city through the District 10 Participatory Budgeting program, spearheaded by former Supervisor Malia Cohen's office. The program allows residents of a few districts in San Francisco to vote on funding one-time neighborhood improvement projects. After a successful campaign, the city awarded the money in 2018, and planning for the restoration began.

The city commissioned a Malcolm X mural on the Kirkwood Star Market, painted by artist Refa-1 in 1997 and the murals painted on Joseph Lee Recreational Center by artist Dewey Crumpler titled "The Fire Next Time" (presumably after the James Baldwin book of the same name) in 1984 of Harriet Tubman, Paul Robeson, two Senufo birds which in African culture oversee the lives and creativity of the community, King Tut, Muhammed Ali, Willie Mays, Wilma Rudolph and Arthur Ashe.

On Egbert Street, painted by Korean artist Chris "Royal Dog" Chanyang Shim in 2016, a mural features a young African-American girl in a traditional Korean hanbok robe with Korean characters above her head translate to the phrase "You will be a blessing." Other artists that contributed to the 9 murals alone Egbert St are Cameron Moberg, Ricky Watts, Dan Pan, Strider, Annie, Vanessa Agana Espinoza, Mel Waters, William Holland crowned "The Mayor of Egbert" by the community.

The murals were revealed during Imprint City's "block party" and was mostly commissioned with private funds, but public funds were secured by the California Arts Council. On April 21, 2021, Afatasi the Artist, Tanya Herrera and four other artists designed a group of the new murals that line Evans Avenue and Hunters Point Boulevard viewed only in the pedestrian lane in Bayview-Hunters Point.

Along the Third Street corridor, there are many more murals including:

- A piece featuring President Obama and Michelle Obama created by Mel Waters at the corner of Oakdale and 3rd St.
- "Don't Dump Oil," created by artist Cameron Moberg's above the community garden next to the Bayview Opera House and Old Skool Cafe, encourages locals to avoid polluting the local waterways by properly disposing of old oil instead of dumping it into drains or sewers.
- "Untitled", by Bryana Fleming on Palou Ave at 3rd St. (2010)
- "Southeast Community Facility Founders", by Santie Huckaby on Oakdale Ave and Phelps St. (2007)
- "Lenora Le Von", by Bryana Fleming on 3rd St at Palou Ave. (2010)
- "Untitled", by an Unknown Artist on Quesada Ave & Newhall St.
- "Candlestick Point Mural Project", by Barbara Plant on 1150 Carroll Avenue. (1982)
- "Untitled", by Santie Huckaby and Eustinove Smith on 1520 Oakdale Ave. (1999)
- "What's Going On?", by Christy Majano on Revere Ave and Selby St. (2011)
- "Soul Journey", by Precita Eyes on Carrol Ave & 3rd St. (2000)
- "History of Bayview", by Bryana Fleming on Palou Ave & 3rd St. (2011)
- "Untitled", by Christy Majano on 4820 3rd St and Bounty of the Bay by Fasm on 1605 Jerrold Ave. (2010)
- "Untitled", by Andre Jones in collaboration with the Warriors & "Paint the Void" on the corner of 4442 3rd St. (2020)
- "Untitled", by CeCe Carpio on 4608 3rd St. (2020)
- "Mario Woods", by Unknown on Keith and Fitzgerald Street. (2018)
- "Bayview Forever" by Elena Shao, featuring the Marvel comic book character Black Panther.
- "Bayview Rise" is an illuminated animated mural located at the Port of San Francisco's Pier 92 grain silos on Islais Creek. The project was created to create images that reflect the Bayview neighborhood's changing economy, ecology, and community. Its large-scale graphics make its primary images visible from a distance but when viewed up close, it reveals the abstract patterns from which those images are composed. At night, the imagery is animated with lighting effects to allow viewers to enjoy the work throughout the day. The artwork was conceived to symbolize a gateway into Bayview Hunters Point and is visible and changing from day to night. (2013)

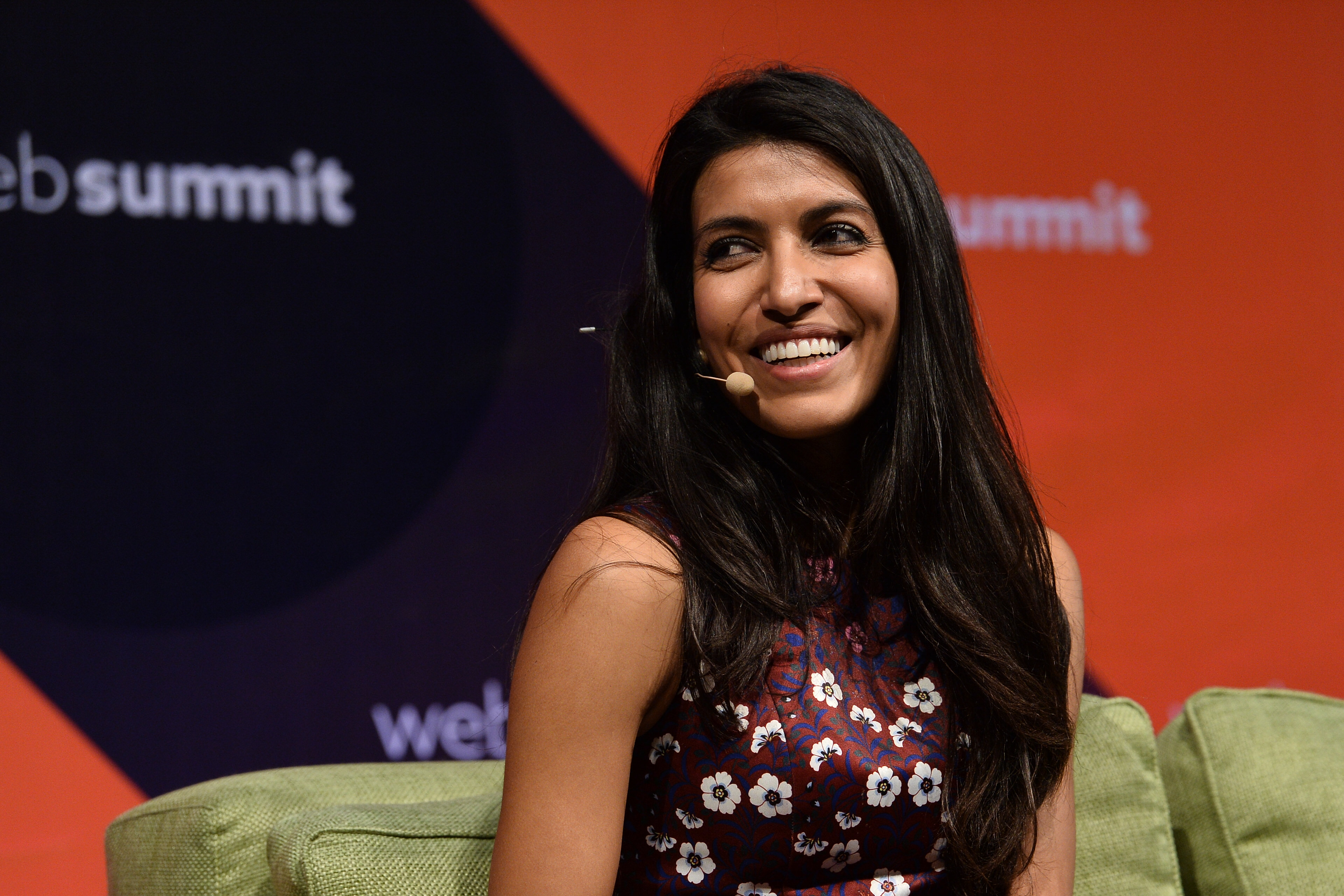
Late tech entrepreneur Leila Janah

=== Multimedia and technology ===
Kimberly Bryant founded Black Girls Code, not-for-profit organization that focuses on providing technology education for African-American girls, in the Bayview in 2011.

In 2012, Leila Janah started Samaschool with a pilot program in the Bayview-Hunters Point community. The model originally focused on training students to perform digital work competitively, to prepare them for success on online work sites like oDesk and Elance.

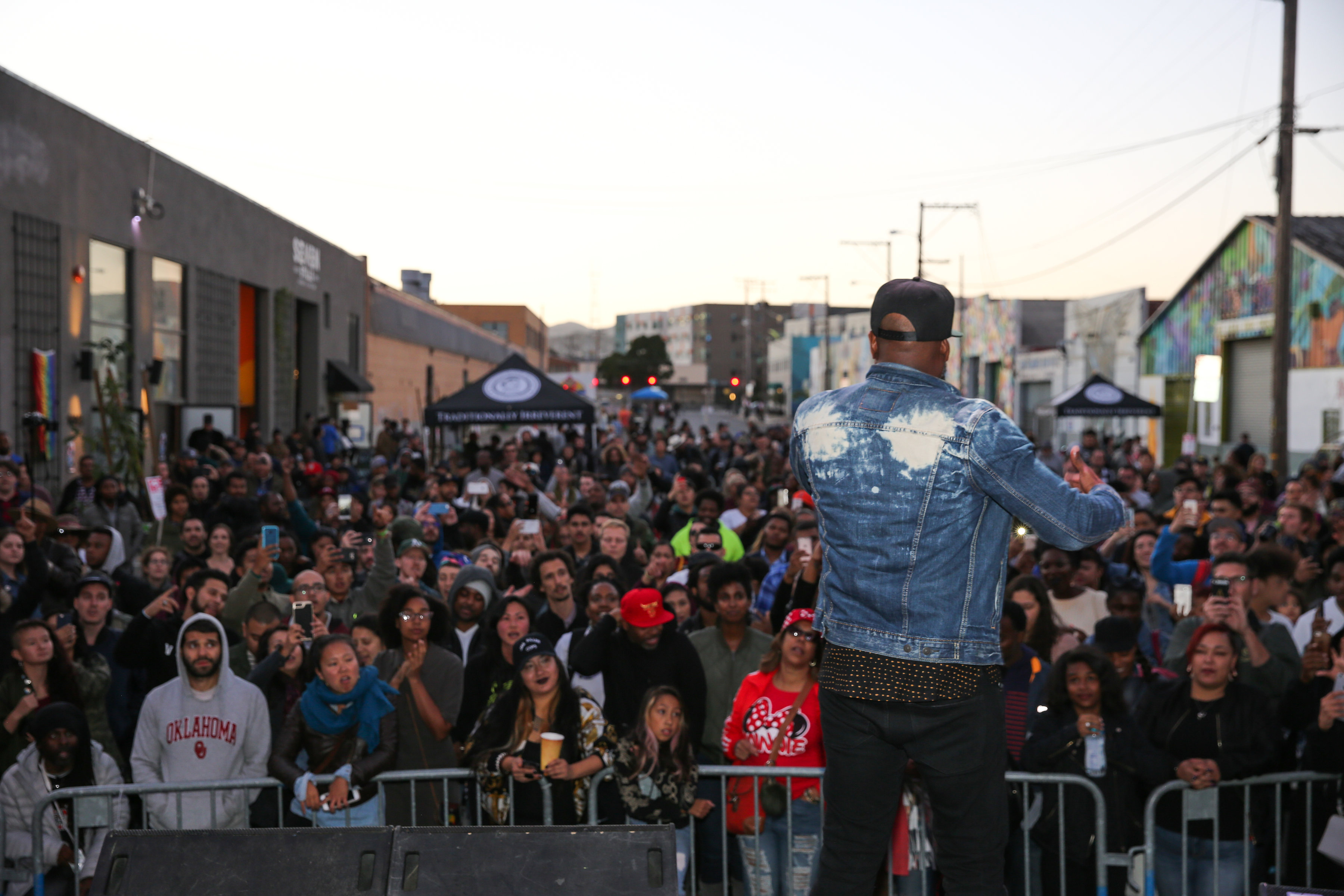
Talib Kweli headlines the BayviewLIVE Festival.

A collaboration was completed with singer-songwriter Michael Franti and Freq Nasty, in which Franti's single "The Future" was remixed in support of a Bay Area nonprofit Beats for a Better Future to help create a music studio for at-risk youth in Bayview-Hunters Point.

Although located in the Dogpatch district not Bayview, long time center for technology and the arts, BAYCAT Studio (short for Bayview Hunters Point Center for Arts and Technology) provides a productive space for low-income youth, young people of color, and young women in the Bay Area to learn the technical side of multi-media production. According to their site, BAYCAT exists "to end racial, gender, and economic inequity by creating powerful, authentic media while diversifying the creative industry. Through the education and employment of low-income youth, young people of color, and young women in the Bay Area, and producing media for socially-minded clients, we are changing the stories that get shared with the world."

=== Dance ===
The Hunters Point Shipyard is home to the country's largest artist colony, "The Point". Zaccho Dance Theatre, founded by Artistic Director Joanna Haigood, one of the main professional dance companies in BVHP since opening their studio in 1990. In 2018 the Zaccho Dance Studio put on a live event titled, Picture Bayview Hunters Point that showcase the history of Bayview-Hunter's Point through dance. Other studios include all female dance studio, Feline Finesse Dance Company.

== Landmarks and attractions ==
=== Historic buildings ===
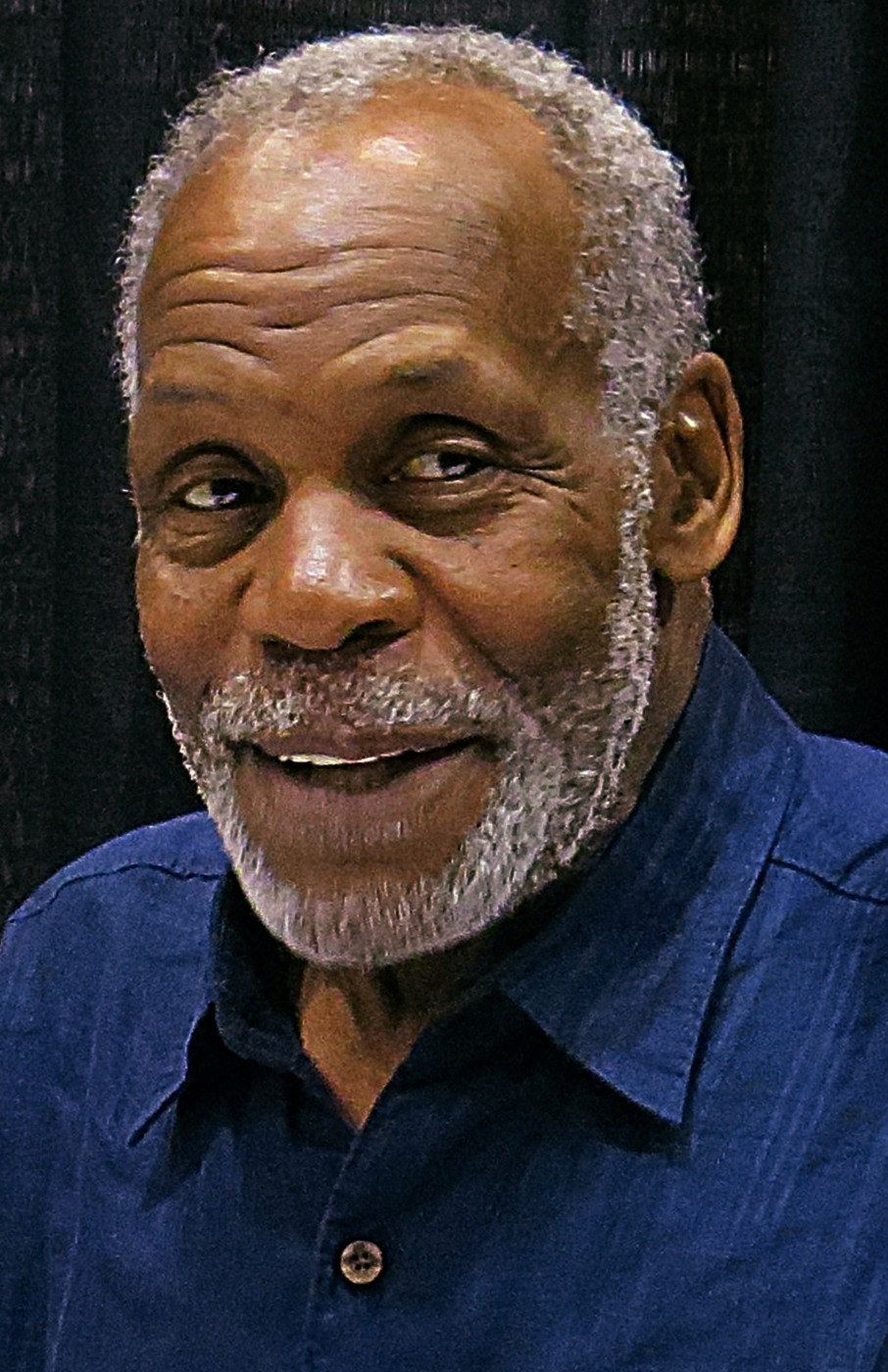
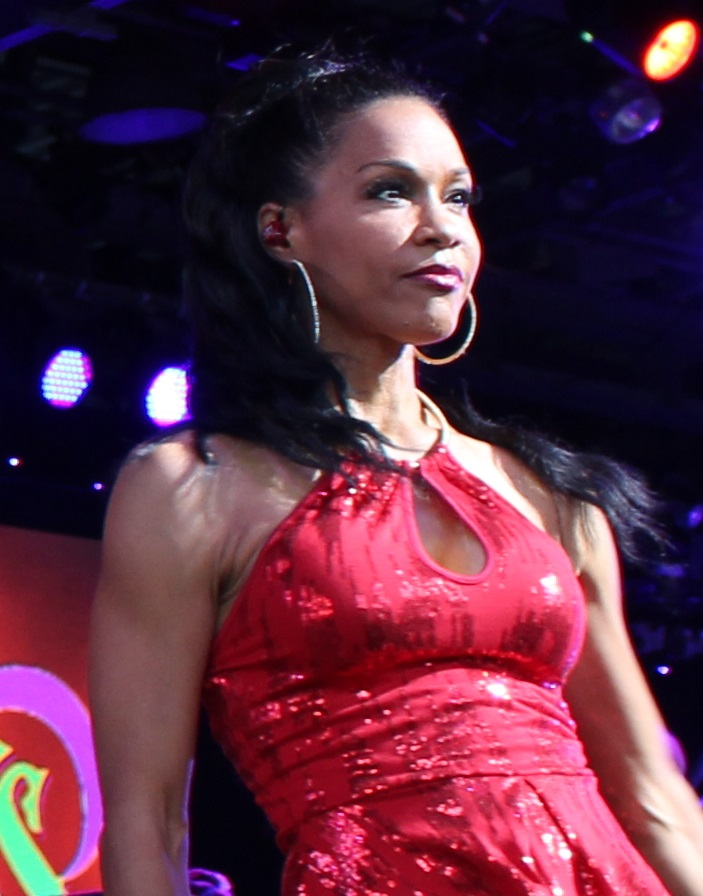
Danny Glover (left), Cindy Herron (right) both credit the Bayview Opera House for jump starting their careers.

Five buildings historic buildings in the district, which are listed in as San Francisco Designated Landmarks.

The Bayview Opera House (previously South San Francisco Opera House), located at 4705 Third St., was constructed in 1888 and designated a California landmark on December 8, 1968. It was nominated for the National Registry in 2010, and won the Governor's Award for Historic Preservation in 2011. For Black History Month in 2014, Tony Saunders hosted an event at the opera house with special guest. In 2017 the Bayview opera house hosted Hercules in the Bayview presented by Theater of War Productions and featured dramatic readings by acclaimed actors Reg E. Cathey, Frances McDormand, Linda Powell, David Strathairn who read scenes from Euripides' The Madness of Hercules. The event was partnered by Bret Harte School and OnePurpose School, the Golden State Warriors, Bayview Hunters Point YMCA, The San Francisco Foundation, KQED, The 3rd Street Youth Center & Clinic, Infinity Productions Inc., former D10 Supervisor Malia Cohen, and The San Francisco Chapter of The Links, Incorporated. The Opera House has also screened films such as The Hate U Give, Sorry to Bother You, Blindspotting, and Toni Morris: The Pieces I Am.

The Albion Brewery was built in 1870 and opened as the Albion Ale And Porter Brewing Company (this was also the location of the Hunters Point Springs and the Albion Castle). Located at 881 Innes Avenue, it was listed as a San Francisco Designated Landmark on April 5, 1974.

The Quinn House, located at 1562 McKinnon Avenue, was built in c. 1875 and listed as a San Francisco Designated Landmark on July 6, 1974.

The Sylvester House at 1556 Revere was built in c. 1870 and listed as a San Francisco Designated Landmark on April 5, 1974.

Historic buildings

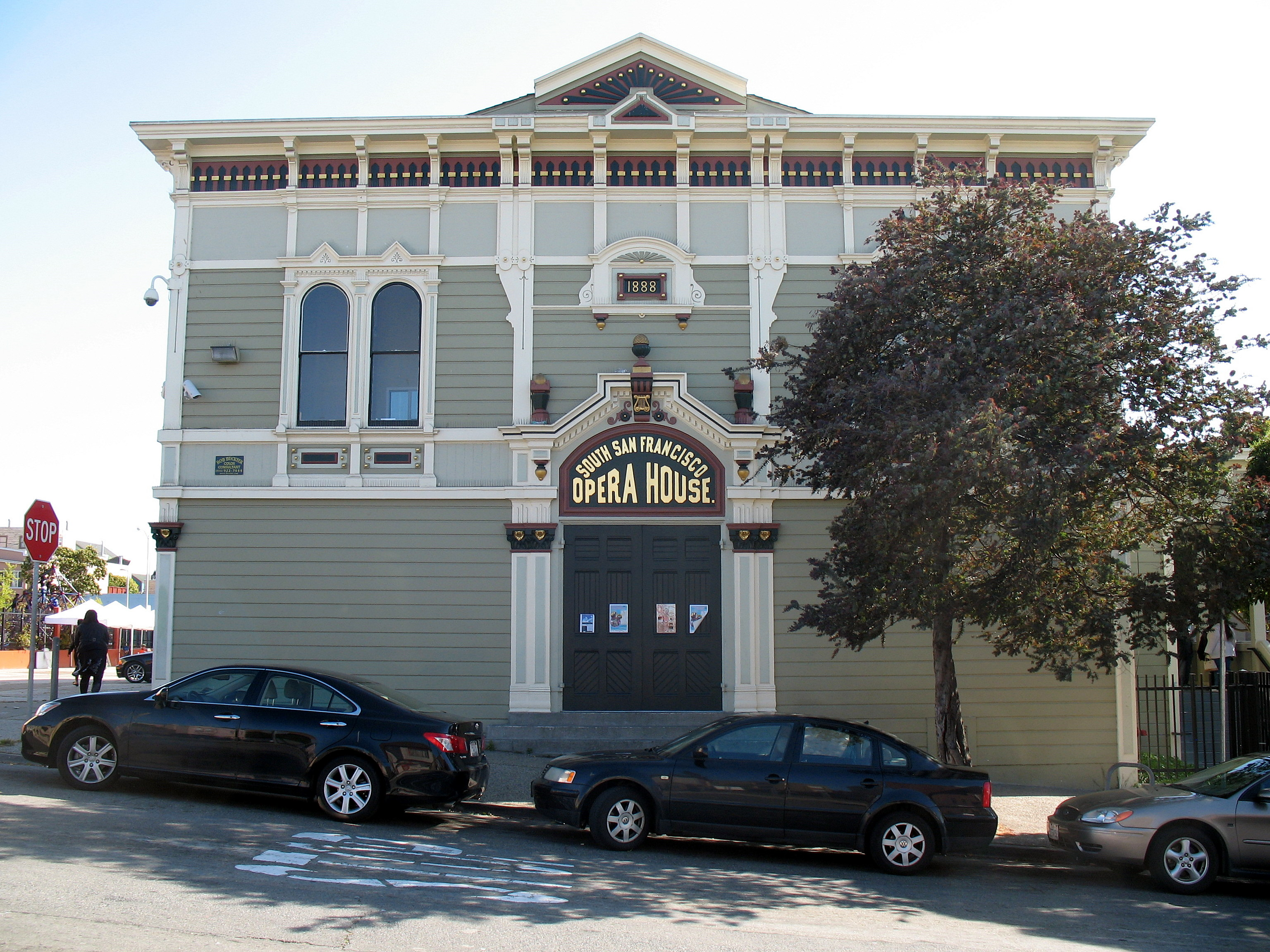
The Bayview Opera House (previously South San Francisco Opera House), built in 1888

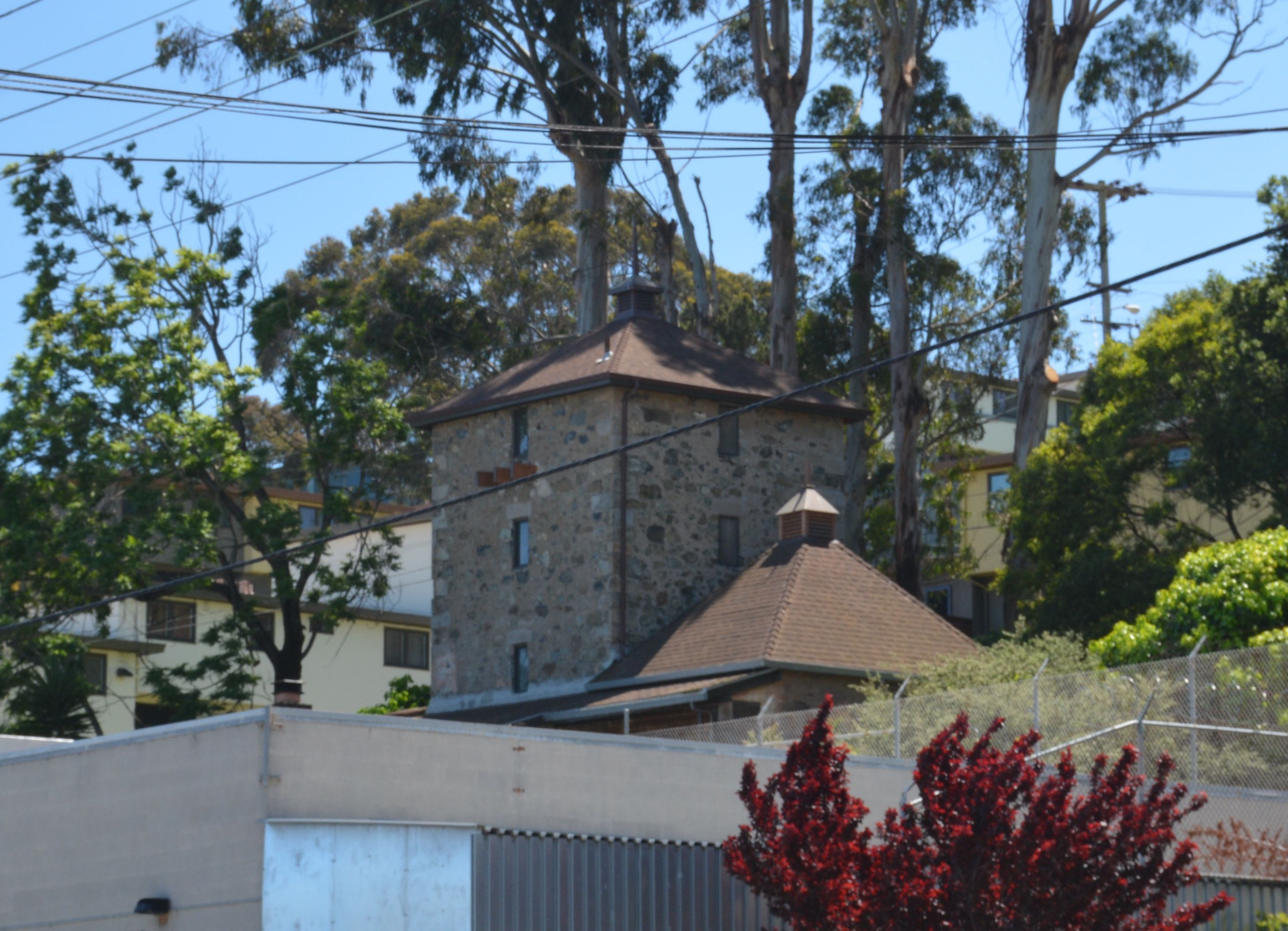
Albion Brewery and Hunters Point Springs at 881 Innes Avenue was built in 1870.

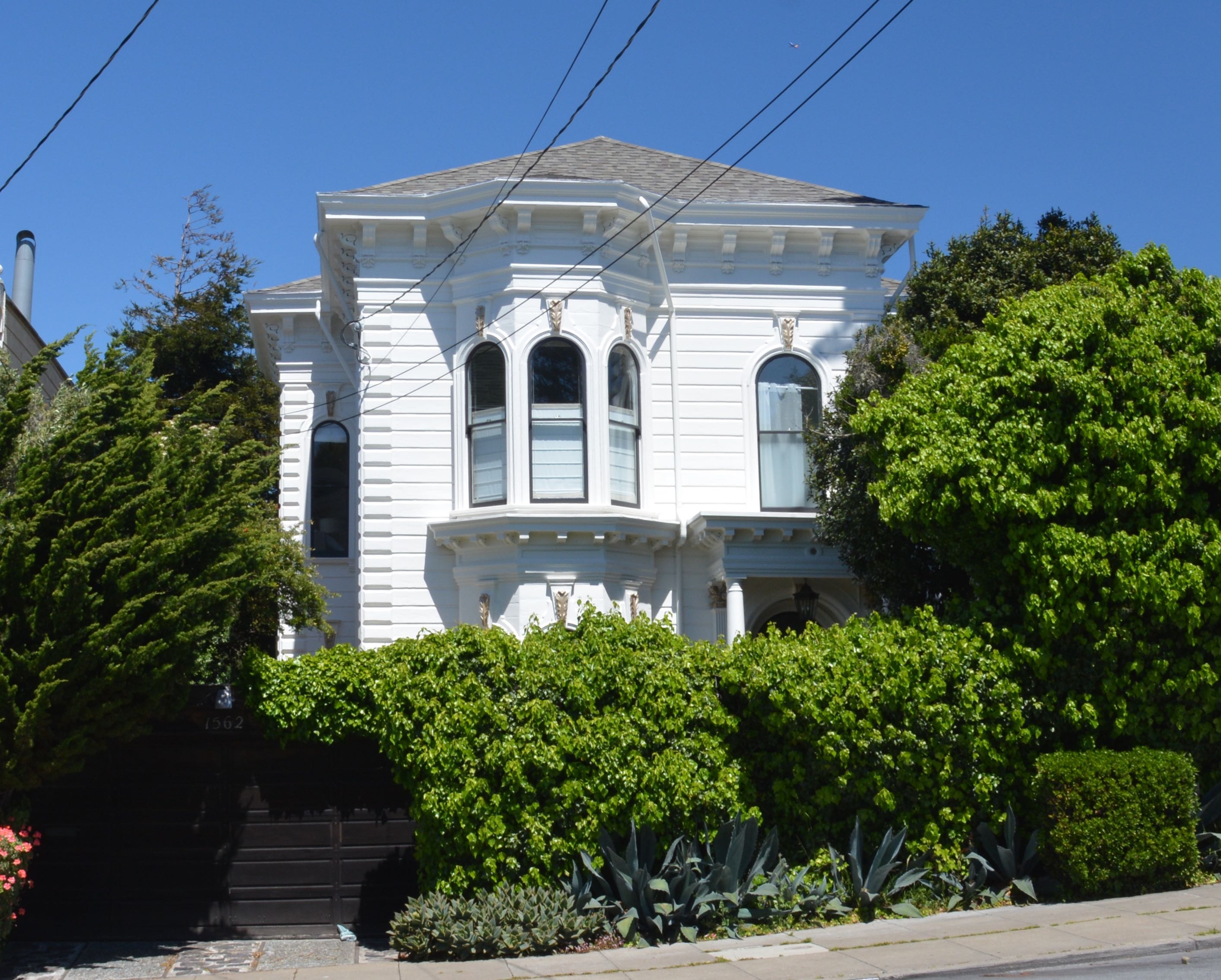
Quinn House at 1562 McKinnon Avenue was built in 1875.

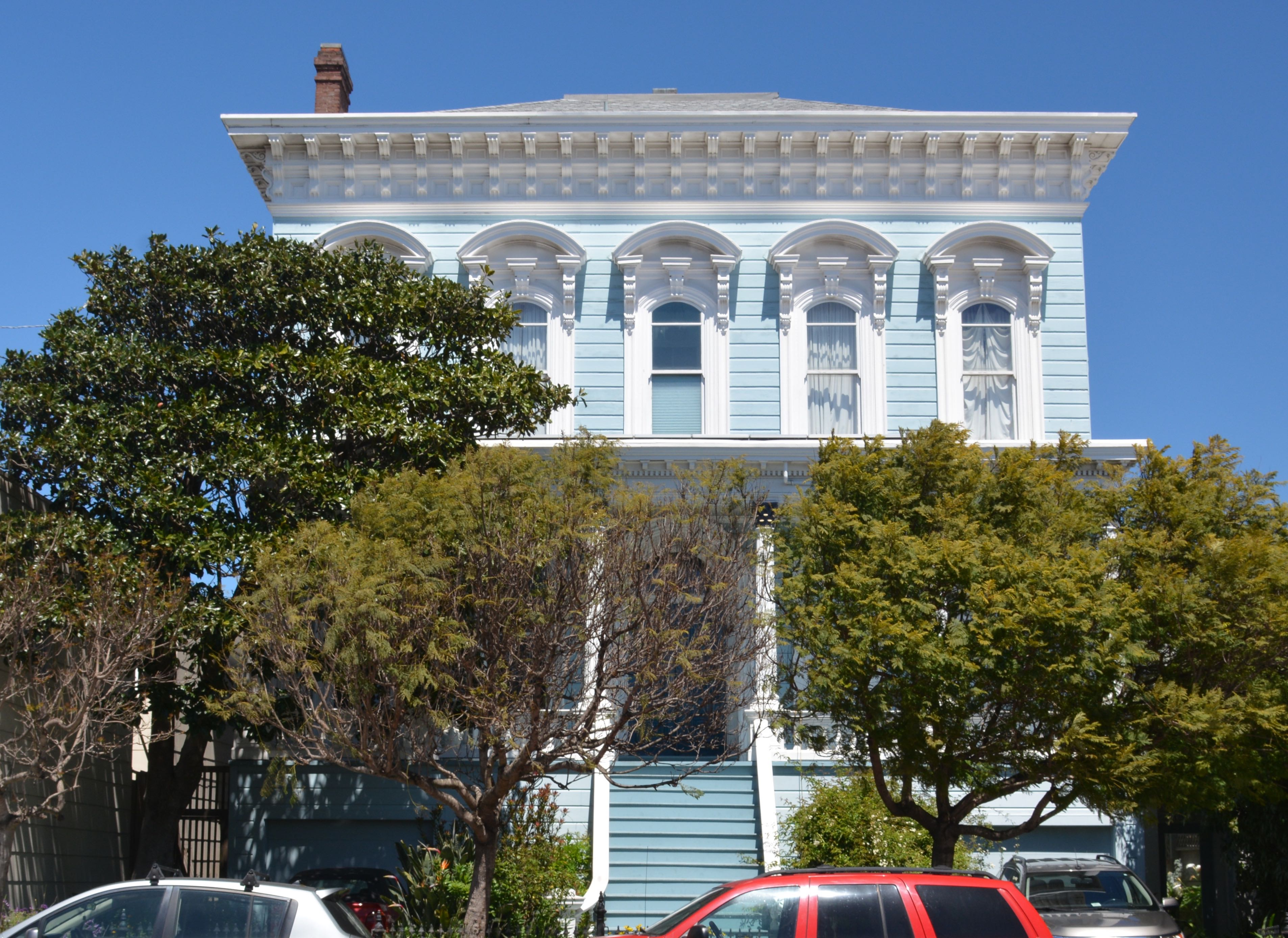
Sylvester House at 1556 Revere was built in 1870.

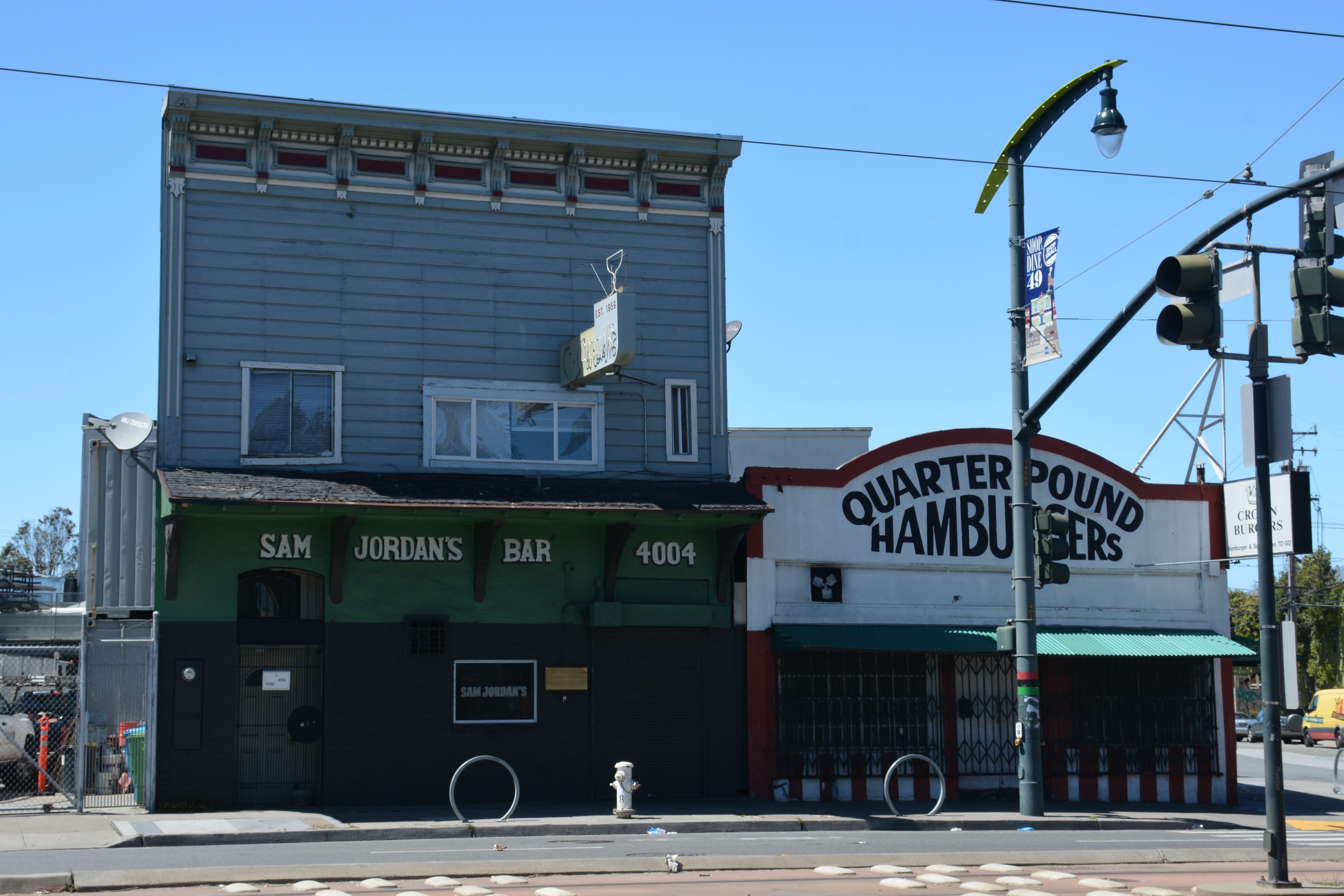
The former "Sam Jordan's Bar" building was designated as an individual landmark on June 20, 2012.

=== Recreation areas ===
==== Candlestick Park ====
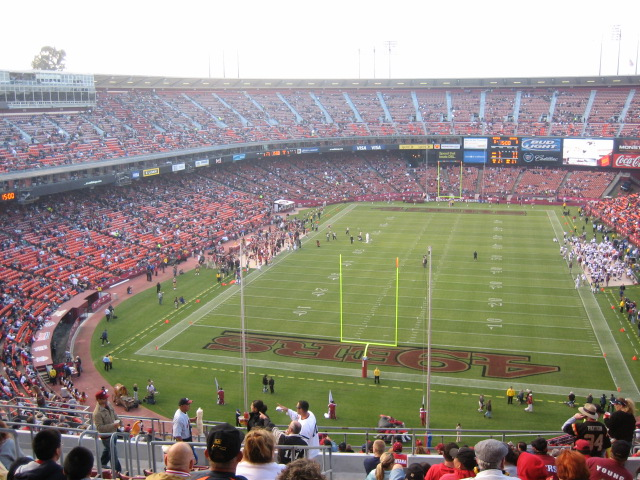
Candlestick Park served as an attraction in the Bayview from 1956 to 2013.

On July 26, 2013, prior to it being demolished, Justin Timberlake and Jay-Z brought the Legends of the Summer Stadium Tour to Candlestick Park.

Many acts prior and after had also performed at Candlestick including The Beatles, Rolling Stones, Jimmy Buffett, Van Halen, Scorpions, Metallica and Paul McCartney. Pope John Paul II celebrated a Papal Mass on September 18, 1987, at Candlestick Park during his tour of America.

==== Martin Luther King Jr Memorial Swimming Pool ====
In 1968, actor Steve McQueen and mayor Joseph Alioto attended the ceremonial groundbreaking for the Martin Luther King Jr. Memorial swimming pool at Third Street and Carroll Avenue. The makers of McQueen's film Bullitt, Warner Bros Studios, donated an initial $25,000 towards the pool's construction in hopes to raise another $50,000 at the movie premiere. Director Woody Allen is also credited with donating $5000 to this project.

==== Parks ====
Bayview is home to multiple large parks. Bayview Park is located on Key Avenue offers sweeping views of the city. Bayview K.C. Jones Playground features a swimming pool and baseball diamond. The Candlestick Point State Recreation Area located on the bay south of Bayview Hill at Candlestick Point is a popular attraction for kayakers and windsurfers. Heron's Head Park, located in the northern part of the neighborhood, is home to a recently resurgent population of Ridgway's rails and the EPA Award-Winning Heron's Head Eco Center. India Basin Shoreline Park features a playground and multipurpose "hypecourt", and it offers waterfront access.

The Quesada Garden, located on Quesada Avenue and 3rd Street in the heart of the neighborhood, is a landmark community open space on a public right-of-way. It is connected to a showcase community food producing garden (Bridgeview Community Teaching and Learning Garden) by two large murals produced with the community by artists Deidre DeFranceaux, Santie Huckaby, Malik Seneferu, and Heidi Hardin. Together, these projects have turned one of the most dangerous and blighted corridors in San Francisco into the safe route through the neighborhood, and have created a destination point for residents and visitors. Karl Paige and Annette Young Smith, retired residents, started planting on an urban median strip in 2002, and were quickly joined by neighbors to complete what is now a 650-foot by 20-foot focal point for flowers, food, art and community building. Thirteen mature Canary Island date palm trees on the block are on the San Francisco Registry of Historic Trees. In 2008 Annette Smith, one of the founders of the revitalized Quesada Community Garden.

===== India Basin Waterfront Park =====
In 2014, the San Francisco Recreation and Park Department acquired the 900 Innes Avenue property in India Basin. The property was the former site of a shipbuilding center, the Shipwright's Cottage, and an 18-month environmental cleanup at the site was completed in August 2022. In October 2018, the San Francisco Board of Supervisors approved a plan to combine India Basin Shoreline Park, India Basin Shoreline Open Space, and the 900 Innes Avenue lot to create India Basin Waterfront Park. In February 2022, the city of San Francisco unveiled an Equitable Development Plan (EDP) "with the goal of preserving the culture and identity of the historic neighborhood" during the construction of the park. The partnership includes the A. Philip Randolph Institute, the Trust for Public Land, and San Francisco Parks Alliance. India Basin Waterfront Park is part of the Blue Greenway initiative to connect San Francisco's southeast waterfront with a series of parks, open spaces, and trails spanning from Oracle Park to Candlestick Point.

==== Ghost streets ====
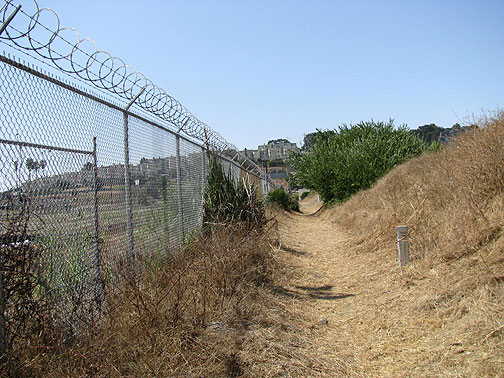
Earl Street along Hunter's Point fence

The Bayview and Hunters Point has many "ghost streets", streets with long corridors that have been since the 1940s. "Ghost streets" exist at the streets Westbrook and Hunters View at the Westbook Public Housing at Fitch Street above Innes Avenue, "Hudson Street" (the fence) above Hawes and Innes. The slope here is a hotspot of native habitat, so aficionados of plants and insects. The locals treat Hudson Street as a way of relieving the heavy traffic on Hunters Point Blvd and Innes Avenue. Another is Earl Street which runs along the fence separating the India Basin Open Space and some private properties from the former Naval Base.

==== "All My USO'S" ====
Yearly at Gilman Park in Bayview, the Polynesian and Samoan community host a BBQ called "All My Uso's" (AMU). The BBQ is held to honor both the heritage of the communities as well as the humanity amongst people. Every year one of the founders JT Mauia who passed of cancer and community activist Taeotui "Jungle Joe" who died from gun violence are honored. At the barbecue kids get free haircuts and face-paint jobs are also offered. All My Uso's (AMU) was founded in San Francisco in 2015 and established as a non-profit organization in 2017. AMU's mission is to promote cultural identity while celebrating diversity and empowerment in underrepresented communities.

== Businesses on the Third Street Corridor ==
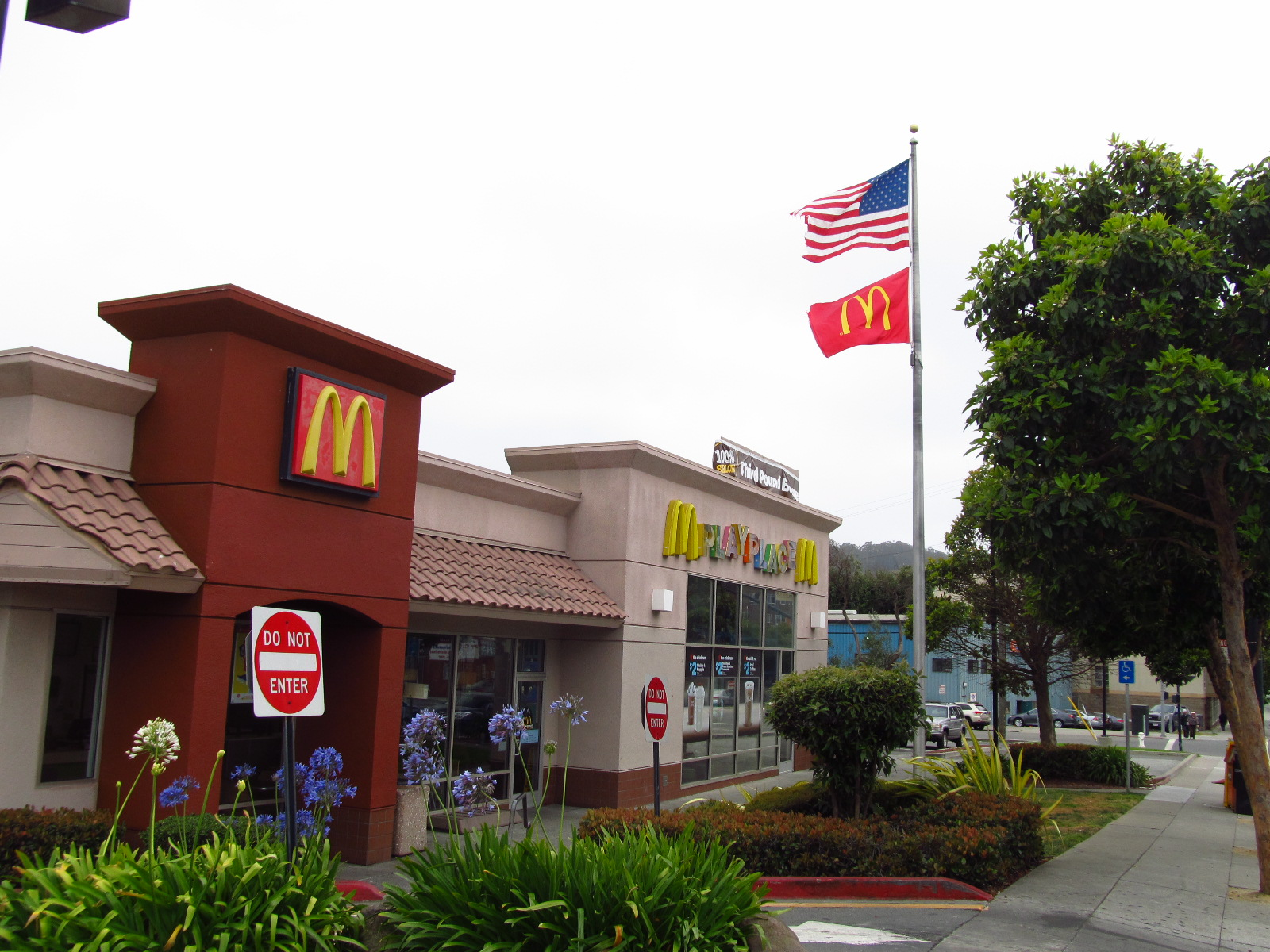
The McDonalds on the Third Street corridor located on Wallace street

After 60 years, the historic and iconic Sam Jordan's Bar and Grill at 4004 3rd Street closed in 2019. Sam Jordan's Bar and Grill was the oldest African-American bar in San Francisco. The Galvez block was renamed "Sam Jordan's Way" in his honor.

The San Francisco Wholesale Produce Market, located on Jerrold Avenue, has been at the center of food distribution in San Francisco since long before moving to its Bayview location in 1963.

In June 2020, San Francisco native, Reese Benton, opened the city's first black-owned woman-led cannabis dispensary, Posh Green Retail Store.

A Lucky's grocery store opened at Bayview Plaza (the site where the old Walgreens stood) in 2022.

=== Mother Brown's Dining Room ===
Mother Brown's Dining Room United Council of Human Services has been a long staple in the Bayview and provides two meals a day to area homeless in the Bayview District but due to permit issues, beds cannot be provided so plastic chairs are provided instead.

== Post offices ==
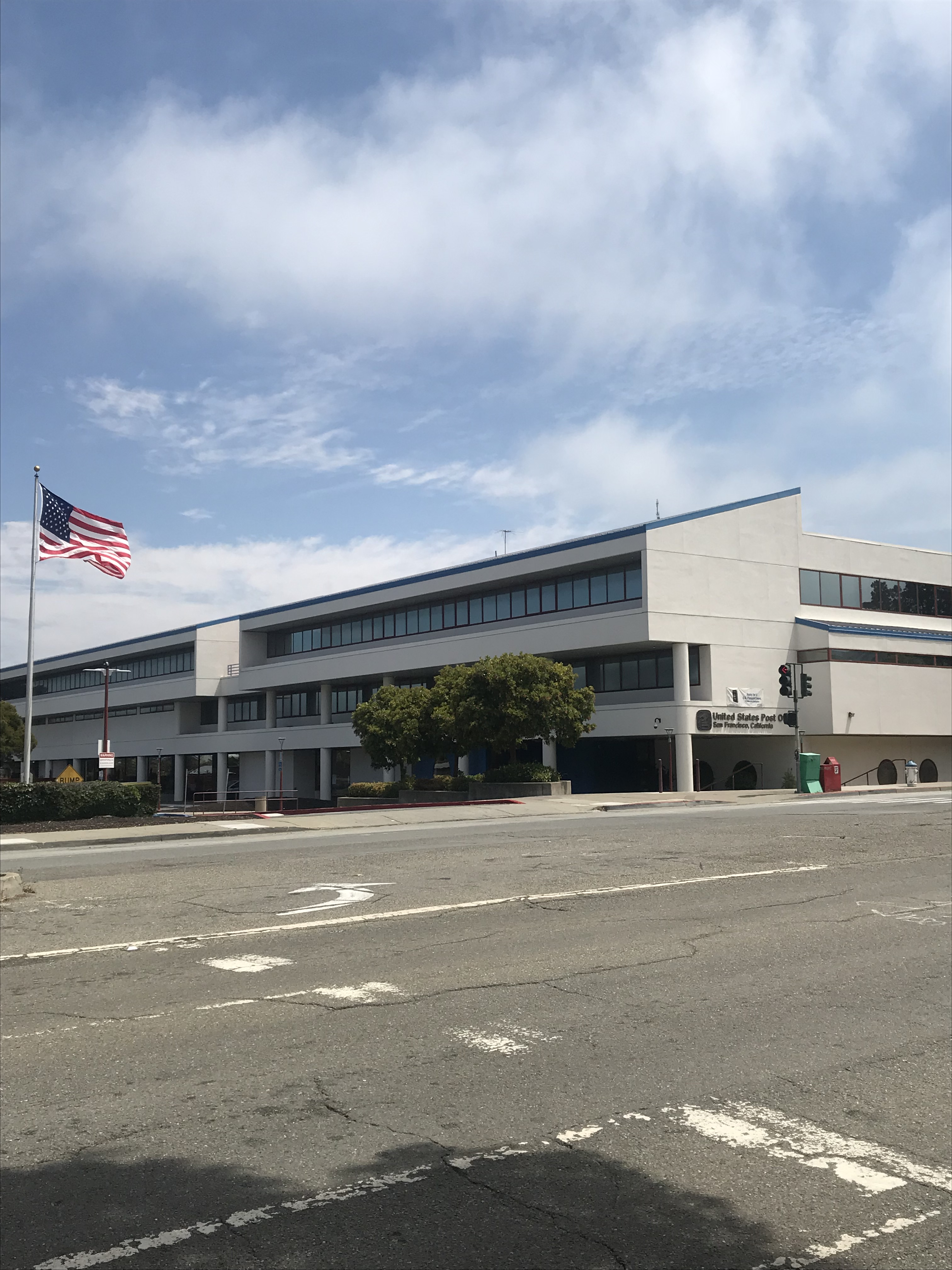
The Evans Street post office, one of the largest post offices in San Francisco

The Bayview currently has two major USPS offices, the second-largest branch (next to Napoleon Street) located on Evans Street, and a smaller branch on Williams Street.

The USPS in 2011 told Bayview postal employees, community leaders, and local politicians that the closure of Bayview's Williams location was "not in the plans" and "off the table". Months later, all Bayview postal customers were mailed official notifications of an impending closure. This stirred up controversy in the immediate community, sparking frustrations and outrage. From residents to politicians, many cited racial and social bias as the reasoning for the closure of the location. Residents were encouraged to use their voices and call local the local postmaster.

In 2012 postmaster Raj Sanghera announced that the Bayview Williams location was taken off the closure list, with other branches as well located in Visitacion Valley, Civic Center, McLaren Station, and San Bruno Avenue.

During the COVID pandemic in 2020, after calling for a #DontMessWithUSPS Day of Action and nearing the November 2020 elections, House Speaker Nancy Pelosi showed up at the Bayview Post Office in San Francisco on Williams Street to discuss her new bill funding the USPS and blocking the Trump administration's overhaul of it. She also had won concessions on mail delivery. Pelosi accompanied with District 10 supervisor, Shamann Walton exclaimed that the Trump administration had been trying to "tamper" with the mail-in ballots by closing several post offices across the country. Other speakers at the Bayview event included letter carriers, someone whose mailbox had been removed, and a veteran with epilepsy who depends on the postal service for medication.

== Transportation ==
The Bayview is served by the Muni bus and light rail system. Caltrain commuter rail service runs the eastern part of the neighborhood. The rail line formerly served the Paul Avenue station in the Bayview until it closed in 2005. The transportation system enables trips that are minutes to/from downtown being 1/2 mile from Hwy 101 and Interstate 280, and 1.5 miles from Dogpatch and UCSF-Mission Bay. The neighborhood is also 15 min way from SFO. Opening in 2007, the T-Third Street line, a line extension of the Muni Metro system, linked Bayview-Hunters Point to downtown San Francisco. In addition to facilitating a connection between the neighborhood and the rest of the city, many residents cite the T-Third Street also being a contributing factor to rising property values and housing prices in the area.

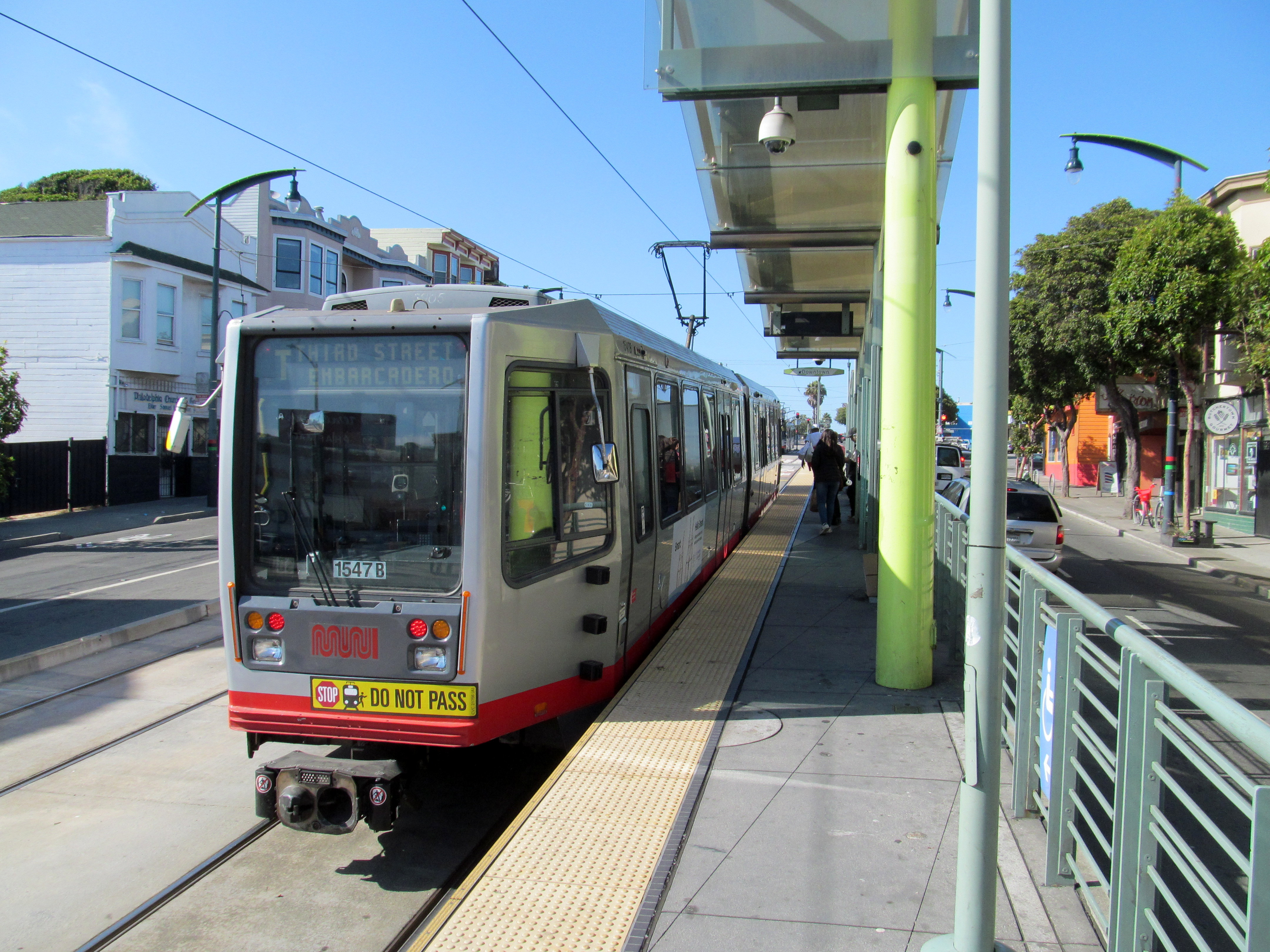
The T Third Street line runs through the Bayview.

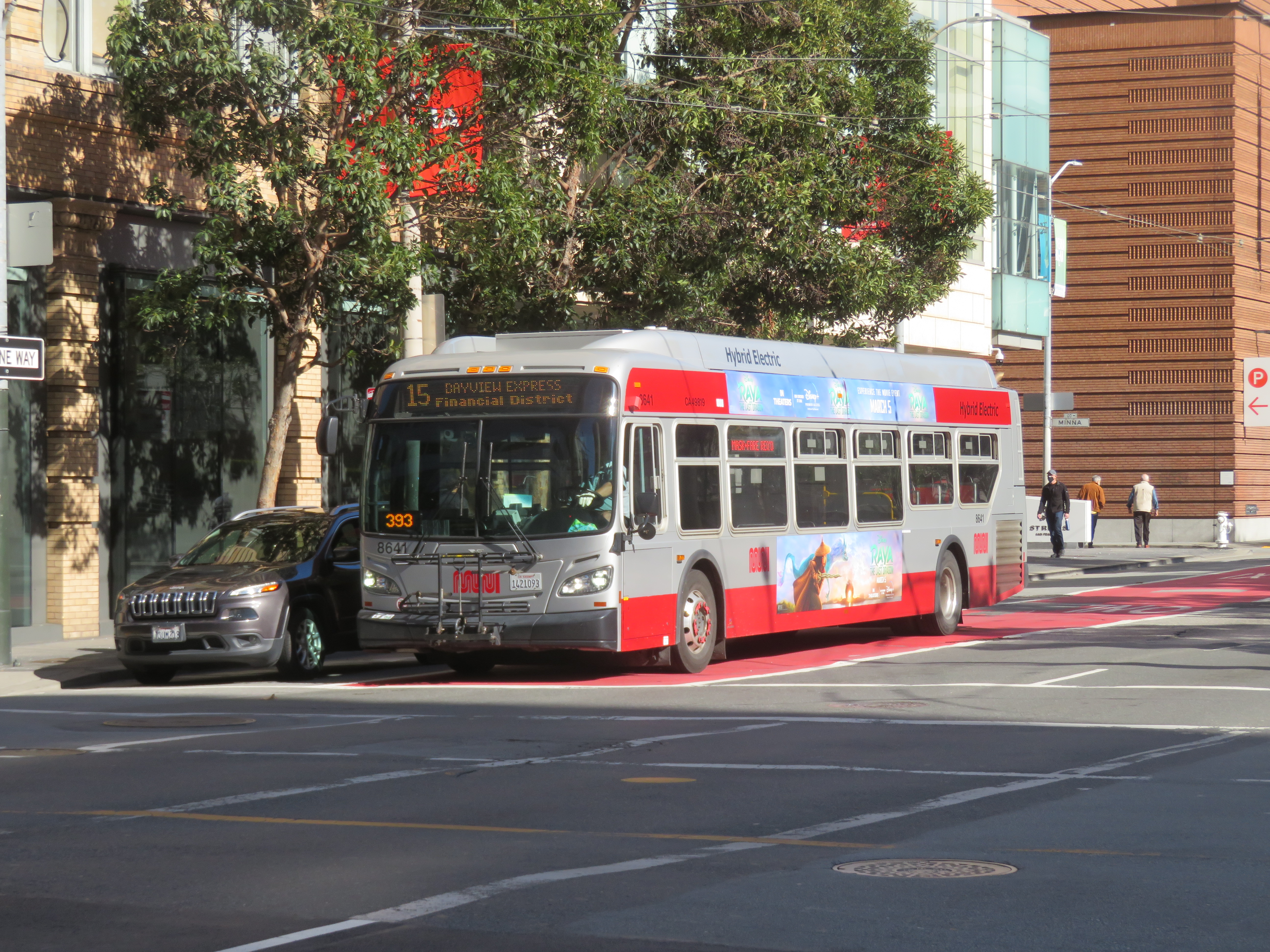
The 15 Bayview "Express" line that runs from the Bayview to downtown San Francisco

Muni transit lines that run through the Bayview include:

=== Active lines ===
- T Third Street
- T Third Street Bus
- T Owl
- 9 San Bruno
- 9R San Bruno Rapid
- 10 Townsend
- 15 Bayview-Hunters Point Express
- 19 Polk
- 23 Monterey
- 24 Divisadero
- 29 Sunset
- 33 Ashbury/18th Street
- 44 O'Shaughnessy
- 48 Quintara/24th Street
- 54 Felton
- 56 Rutland
- 67 Bernal Heights
- 90 San Bruno Owl
- 91 3rd Street/19th Avenue Owl.

=== Defunct lines ===
- 15 Kearny (Now the T Third Street)
- 16 Third Street (Now the T Third Street)

==== San Francisco 49ers pre and post game-day shuttles ====
- 75X Candlestick Express Balboa Park Station
- 77X Candlestick Express California and Van Ness
- 78X Candlestick Express Funston and California
- 79X Candlestick Express Sutter and Sansome
- 86 Candlestick Shuttle Bacon and San Bruno
- 87 Candlestick Shuttle Gilman and Third Street

== In popular culture ==
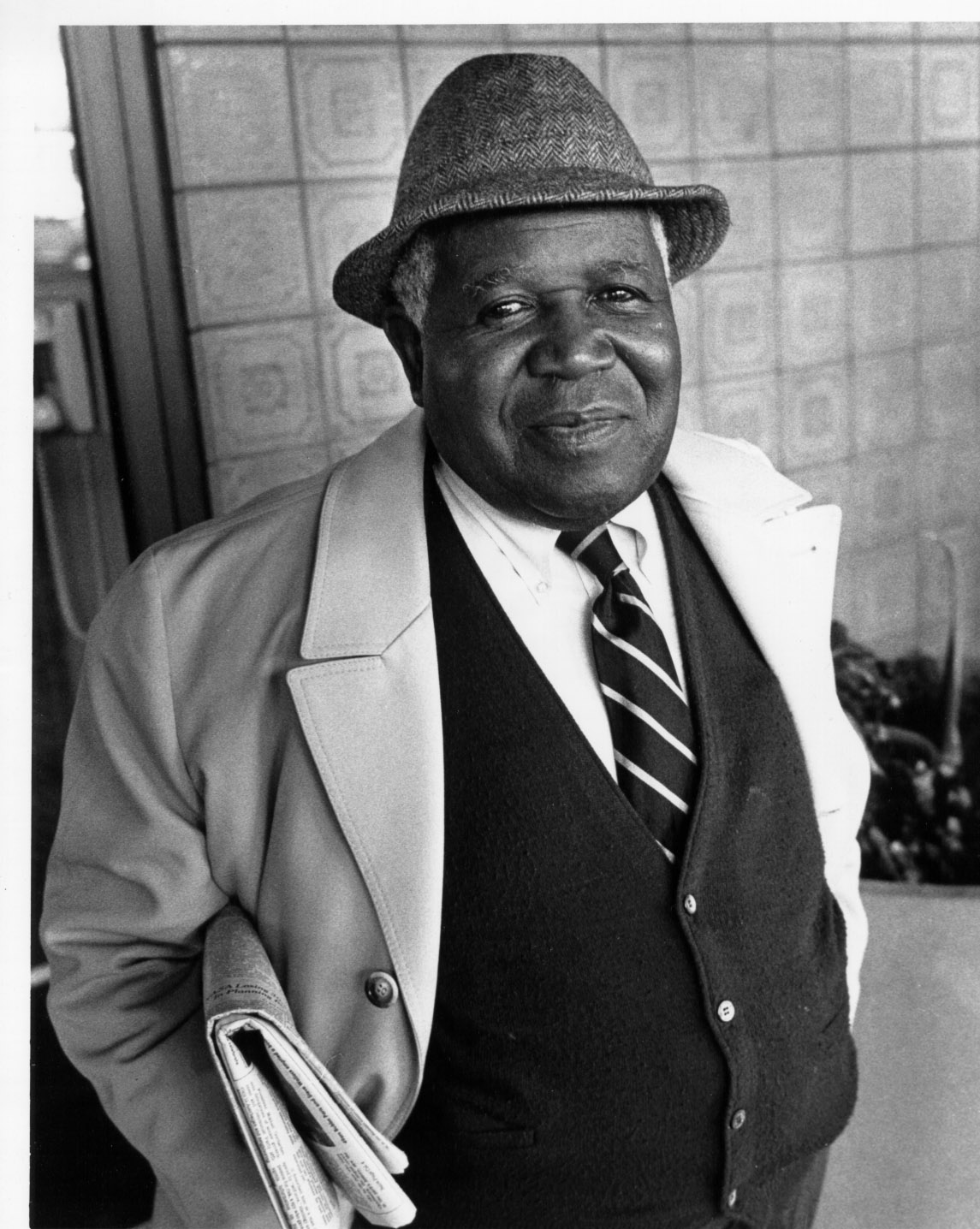
Thomas C. Fleming, the Sun-Reporter's greatest editor and one of the most influential African American journalists on the West Coast in the 20th century

=== Video games ===
- In the 2016 Ubisoft game Watch Dogs 2 which was set in a fictional version of San Francisco; the art installation Bayview Rise was featured.
- In the video game WANTED by Roblox exist the City Bay View near the Oasis City. (The game is based on San Francisco.)

=== Print ===
- The San Francisco Bay View is an African-American newspaper with headquarters located on Third Street.
- Thrasher magazine also houses headquarters in the Bayview.
- The Examiner prints out of the Bayview.
- The Sun-Reporter, a historic weekly newspaper, operates out of Bayview.

=== Radio ===
- Radio station KYA broadcast out of Bayview Park until it was sold to the Hearst Publishing Company in 1934, becoming the full-time voice of the San Francisco Examiner.
- KALW 91.7 FM local public radio and the San Francisco Arts Commission to tell the stories of the people who live, work, and have a positive impact on San Francisco's Bayview neighborhood

=== Film ===
==== Full-length films ====
- The Midnight Story starring Tony Curtis, some scenes in the film were shot in Bayview. The St. Joseph Orphanage Asylum, originally located at Revere/Newhall, is the site of several set-ups. The All Hallows Chapel, at Newhall/Palou is also used in the funeral scene. (1957)
- The Hunters Point Shipyard made a cameo appearance in Alfred Hitchcock's Vertigo. (1958)
- The Bayview's Candlestick Park was also home to the location for the climactic scene in the thriller Experiment in Terror. (1962)
- Take This Hammer, a film aired by KQED directed by Richard O. Moore, follows author and activist James Baldwin in the spring of 1963 as he's driven around San Francisco to meet with members of the local African-American community. (1963)
- The film Bullitt features scenes filmed in the Bayview. (1968)
- Freebie and the Bean, a Richard Rush comedy was also filmed at Candlestick Park in Bayview. (1974)
- The Fan, the Robert De Niro and Wesley Snipes film was also filmed in the Bayview. (1996)
- The Spike Lee film, Sucker Free City, Hunter's-Point was used as a backdrop. (2004)
- The Will Smith film The Pursuit of Happyness, the film had a scene that took place at Candlestick Park. (2006)
- Scenes for the film Contagion, starring Matt Damon, Kate Winslet and Jude Law, were filmed at Candlestick stadium. (2011)
- The Last Black Man in San Francisco features scenes that were filmed in Hunter's Point. The Allen house (901 Innes Ave.) and the dock undergoing a hazardous materials cleanup (881 Innes Ave.) in the film's opening scenes are located on adjacent blocks on Innes Street. (2019)

==== Short films ====
- Palm Trees Down 3rd Street, is a short film and film festival winner, directed by Maria Judice, that features the 3rd street corridor.

=== Music videos ===
==== Music videos with prominent artists that feature the Bayview or Hunter's Point ====
- RBL Posse's hit "Don't Give Me No Bammer Weed" was filmed in the Hunter's Point community and features cameos from Ainsley and NBA legend, Shaquille O'Neal. (1992)
- Larry June's music video "Smoothies 1991" (2019)
- Marcus Orelias's music video "Blackouts" featuring Stephan Marcellus (2017)
- Jordan Gomes also known as Stunnaman02's music video "Out that Window" (2019)

=== Documentaries ===
- The short film Point of Pride, released in 2014, is a documentary that focuses on the Bayview-Hunter's Point social uprising of the 50s and 60s.
- Straight Outta Hunters Point was a widely successful early 00s documentary made by filmmaker Kevin Epps showcasing the gang violence in Bayview-Hunter's Point.
- Bay View Hunter's Point: San Francisco's Last Black Neighborhood? an Andante Higgins produced documentary (2004)
- A Choice of Weapons (2008)

=== Television ===
- KQED aired news footage of Bobby Kennedy and George Murphy describing their impressions of housing in Bayview Hunters Point in 1967. The footage also included representatives of Bayview Hunters Point, including Osceola Washington, Harold Brooks and Suzanne Cook.
- Discovery Channel's, Forgotten Planet – Episode 3 focuses on the Hunter's Point Shipyard.
- Sam Jordan's Bar appeared on an episode of Spike's Bar Rescue.
- During the Versuz battle of the Bay between Bay Area legends, E-40 and Too Short. Too Short shouted out the Bayview community. (2021)
- In the animated TV show Fillmore!, one of the main characters, Ingrid Third, was named after the Third Street corridor. The creator of the show, Scott M. Gimple, had developed a keen fascination with San Francisco hence the name being coined after the Fillmore district while couch surfing in his early years.

== Notable residents ==
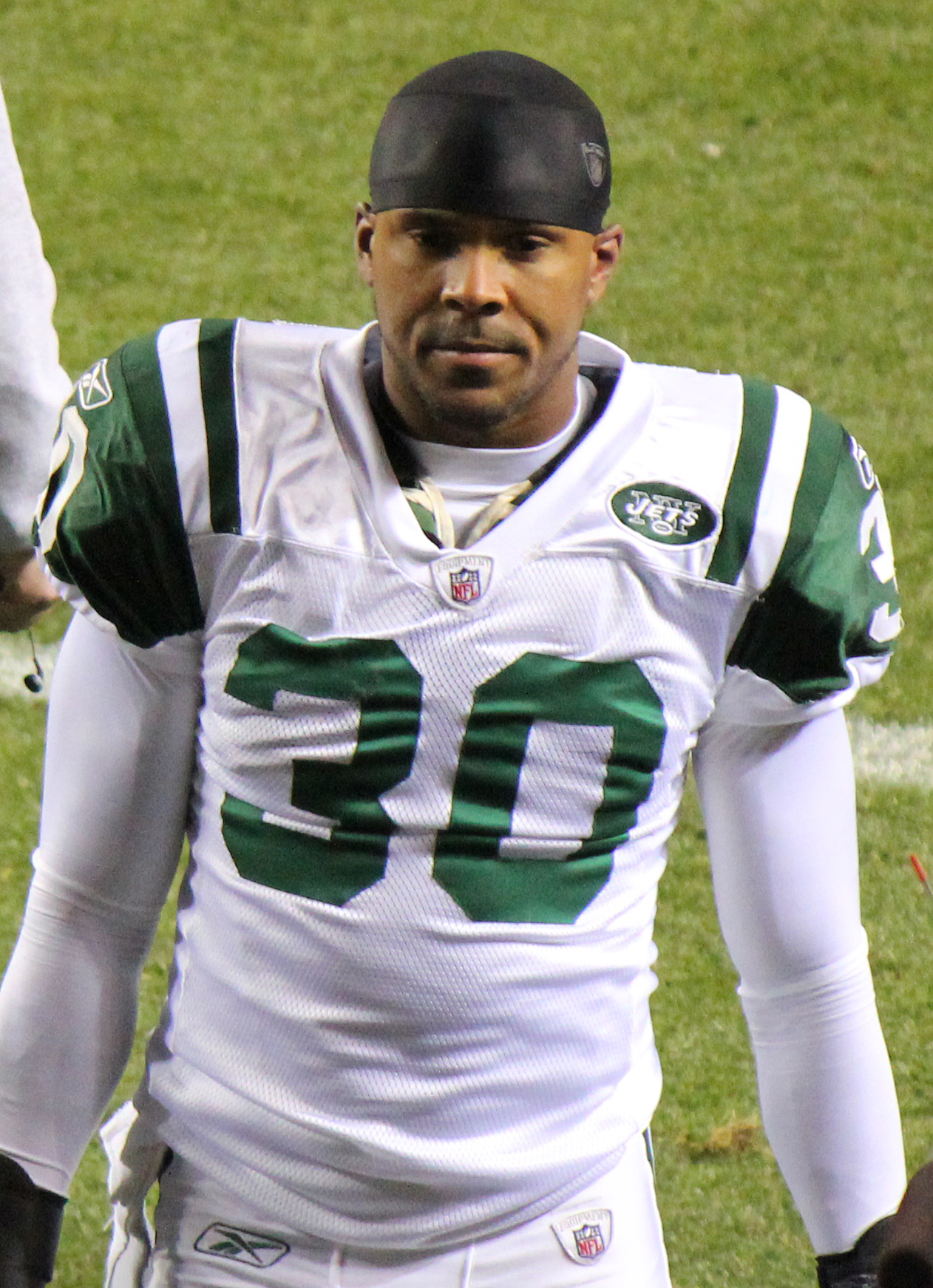
Bayview native Donald Strickland

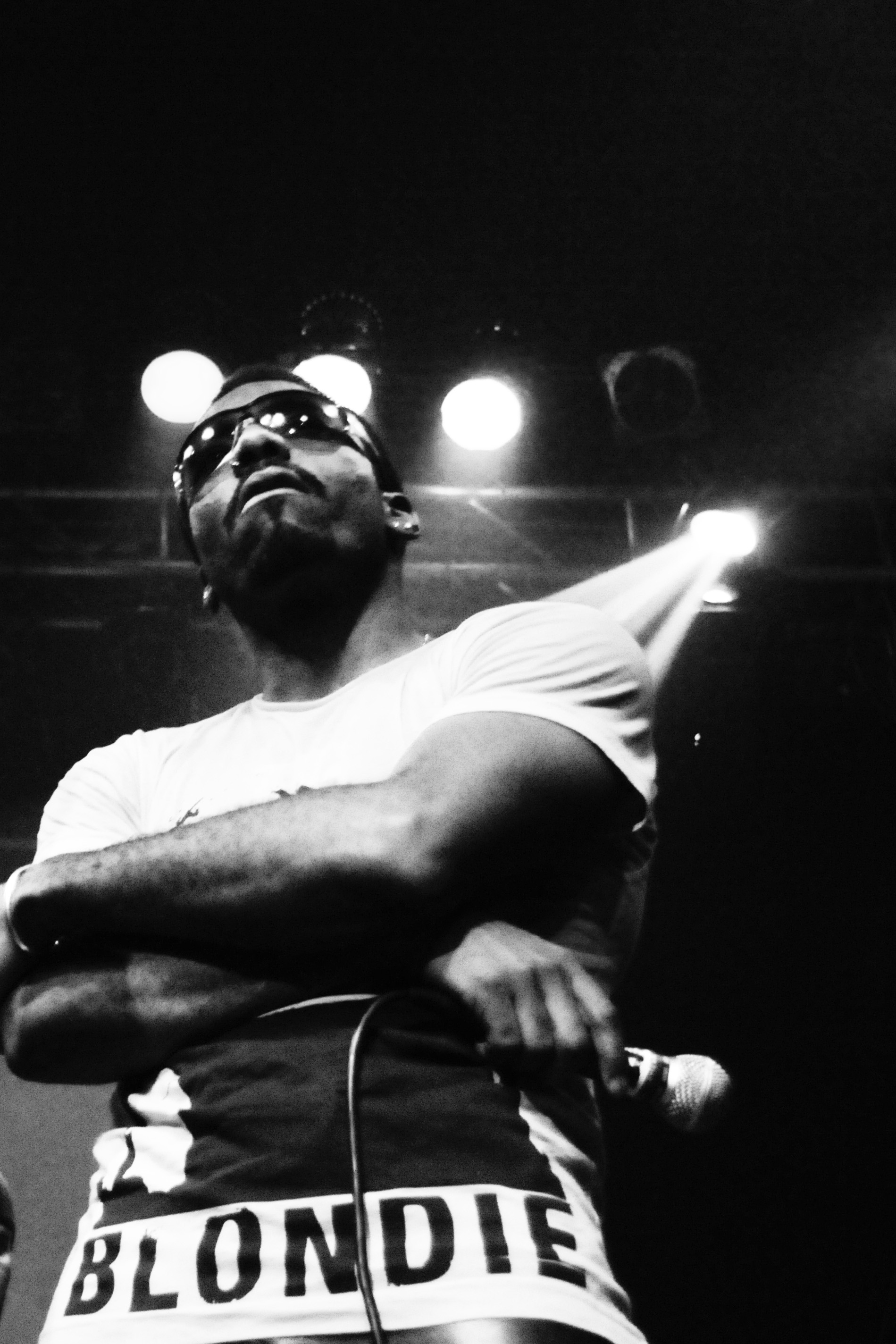
Martin Luther McCoy, guitarist and musician, is also a Bayview native.

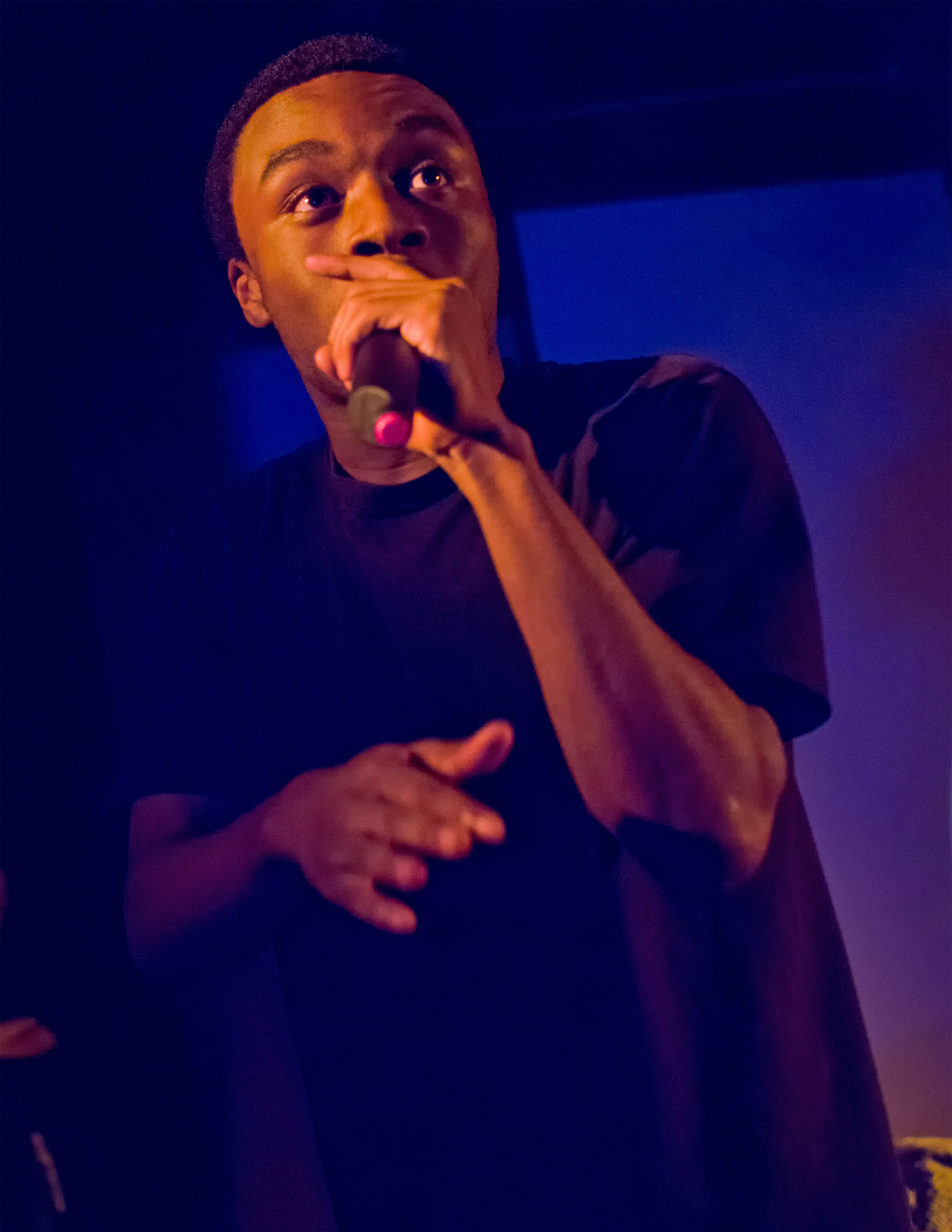
Marcus Orelias, recording artist, entrepreneur and Bayview native

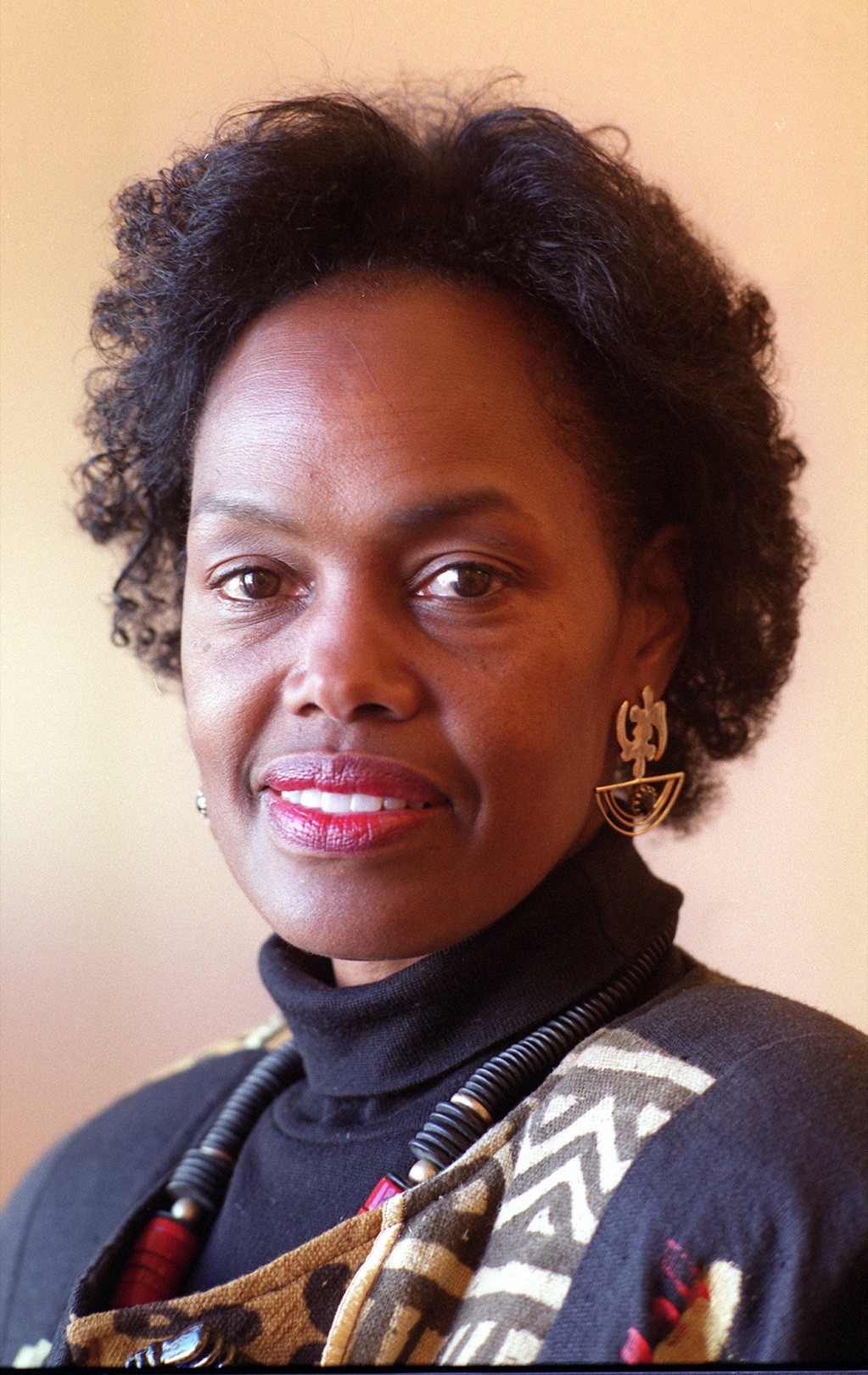
Sophie Maxwell, former District 10 supervisor

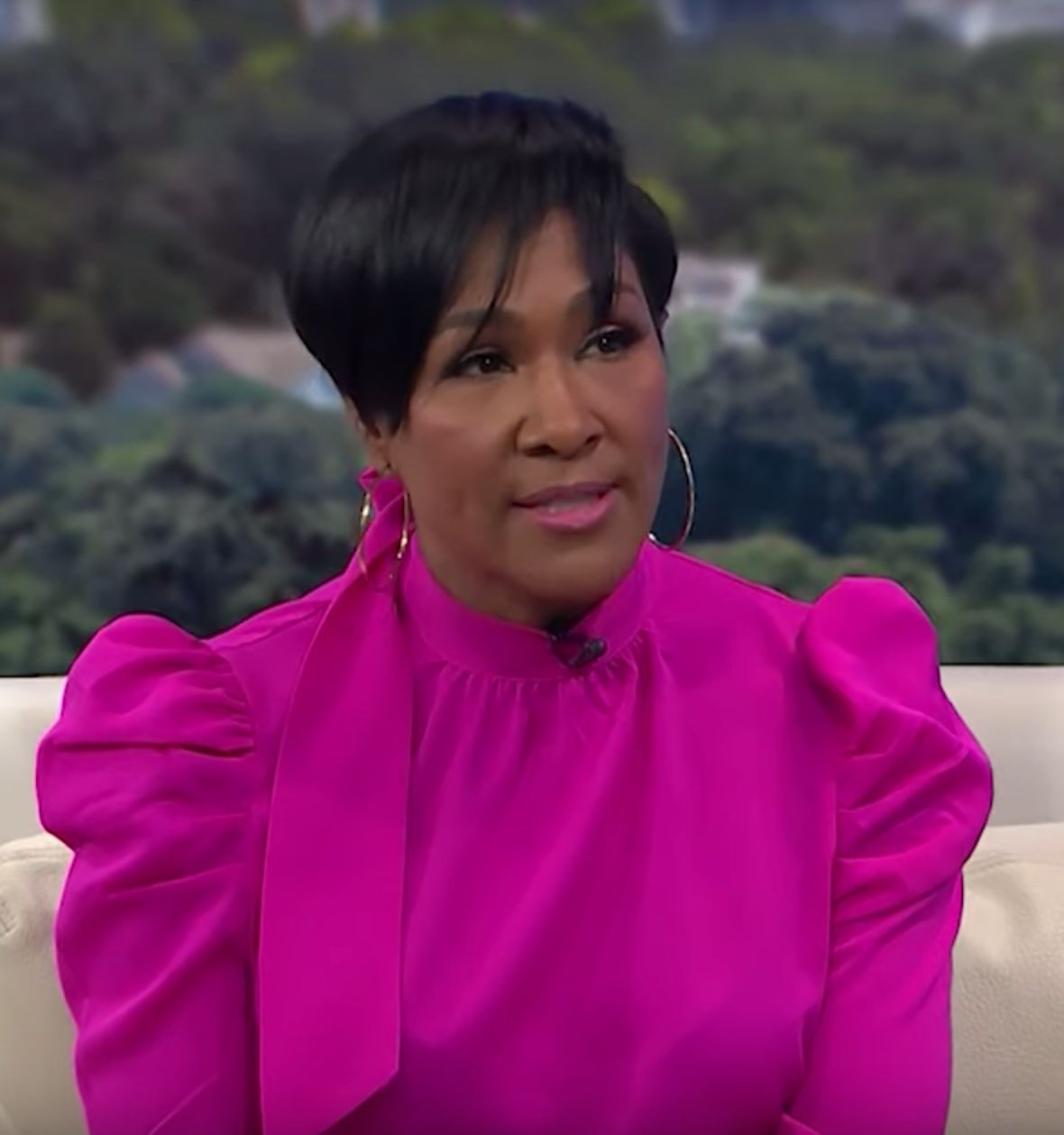
Actress Terri J. Vaughn

=== Music ===
- The Product (a rap-duo composed of Budwyser and Darace), one of the first rap groups out of Hunters Point.
- 11/5, defunct gangsta rap group from the Oakdale public housing projects in Hunters Point
- Eric Melvin, guitarist for NOFX
- RBL Posse, gangsta rap group from Harbor Road public housing projects in Hunters Point
- Ramirez, punk rapper, from Bayview-Hunter's Point signed to New Orleans–based label G*59 Records.
- Prezi, rapper from Hunter's Point.
- Cindy Herron, singer and founding member of En Vogue.
- Martin Luther McCoy, actor, guitarist and musician.
- Larry June, rapper from Hunter's Point.
- Jordan "Stunnaman02" Gomes, rapper and actor from Bayview.
- Marcus Orelias, rapper, actor, and entrepreneur from Bayview.
- Michael Franti, rapper, musician, poet, activist, documentarian, and singer-songwriter.
- Boo Banga, rapper from the Hunter's Point community, famously featured on San Quinn's "San Francisco Anthem".
- Herm, rapper from the Bayview-Hunter's Point.

=== Film, theatre, and television ===
- Kevin Epps, filmmaker best known for the documentary Straight Outta Hunters Point
- Terri J. Vaughn (born 1969), actress born and raised in Bayview–Hunters Point
- Iman Rodney, videographer and Emmy Award winner.
- Maria Judice, filmmaker and artist.
- André Fenley, multi-award winning senior sound mixing, sound editor engineer at Skywalker Sound.
- Ruth Williams was a producer, activist, playwright, and actress. She fundraised in the Bayview with the assistance of Tina Turner, Sly and the Family Stone, the O'Jays, Larry Graham, H.B. Barnum, Danny Glover, Chaka Khan and more. The Bayview Opera House's theatre is named after her.

=== Sports and fitness ===
- Frank "Lefty" O'Doul (1897–1969), an American professional baseball player born and raised in the Bayview.
- Jimmy Lester (1944–2006), former boxer known as the "Bayview Blaster"
- Dion Jordan (born 1990), a professional NFL player born and raised in the Bayview.
- Desmond Bishop, professional NFL player
- Stevie Johnson (born 1986), NFL wide receiver, born and raised in Hunters Point before moving to Fairfield, CA
- Eric Wright (born 1985), NFL player, cornerback for the San Francisco 49ers
- Sam Jordan (1925–2003), professional boxer, politician and founder of Sam Jordan's Bar.
- Donald Strickland (born 1980), NFL player, free agent cornerback who played for the San Francisco 49ers, Indianapolis Colts and New York Jets
- Maria Kang (born 1980), fitness advocate, coach, blogger and founder of the "No Excuse Mom" movement.

=== Medical ===
- Dr. Arthur H. Coleman (1920–2002), the first black physician and one of the last privately practicing family doctors in San Francisco's Bayview-Hunters Point district.
- Dr. Ahimsa Sumchai (born 1952), nutritionist, environmental activist and former professional gymnast responsible for winning the San Francisco Citywide Gymnastics Competition in 1964.

=== Education ===
- Linda Brooks-Burton was a librarian, educator, activist, and loved member of the Bayview community. The main Bayview library is named in her honor.

=== Politics and activism ===
- Espanola Jackson (1934–2016), heralded as "Bayview's greatest activist"; a member of the Muwekma Ohlone tribe.
- Elouise Westbrook (1915–2011) activist
- Mary L. Booker (1931–2017), civil rights activist
- Big Five of Bayview, environmental and community activist
- Sophie Maxwell, resident of the Bayview and former district 10 supervisor.
- Christopher Muhammad, Bay Area Minister of the Nation of Islam
- Marie Harrison (1948–2019), Bayview environmental activist.
- Shamann Walton, resident of the Bayview and district 10 supervisor.
