= The Sorentinos =

American rock band

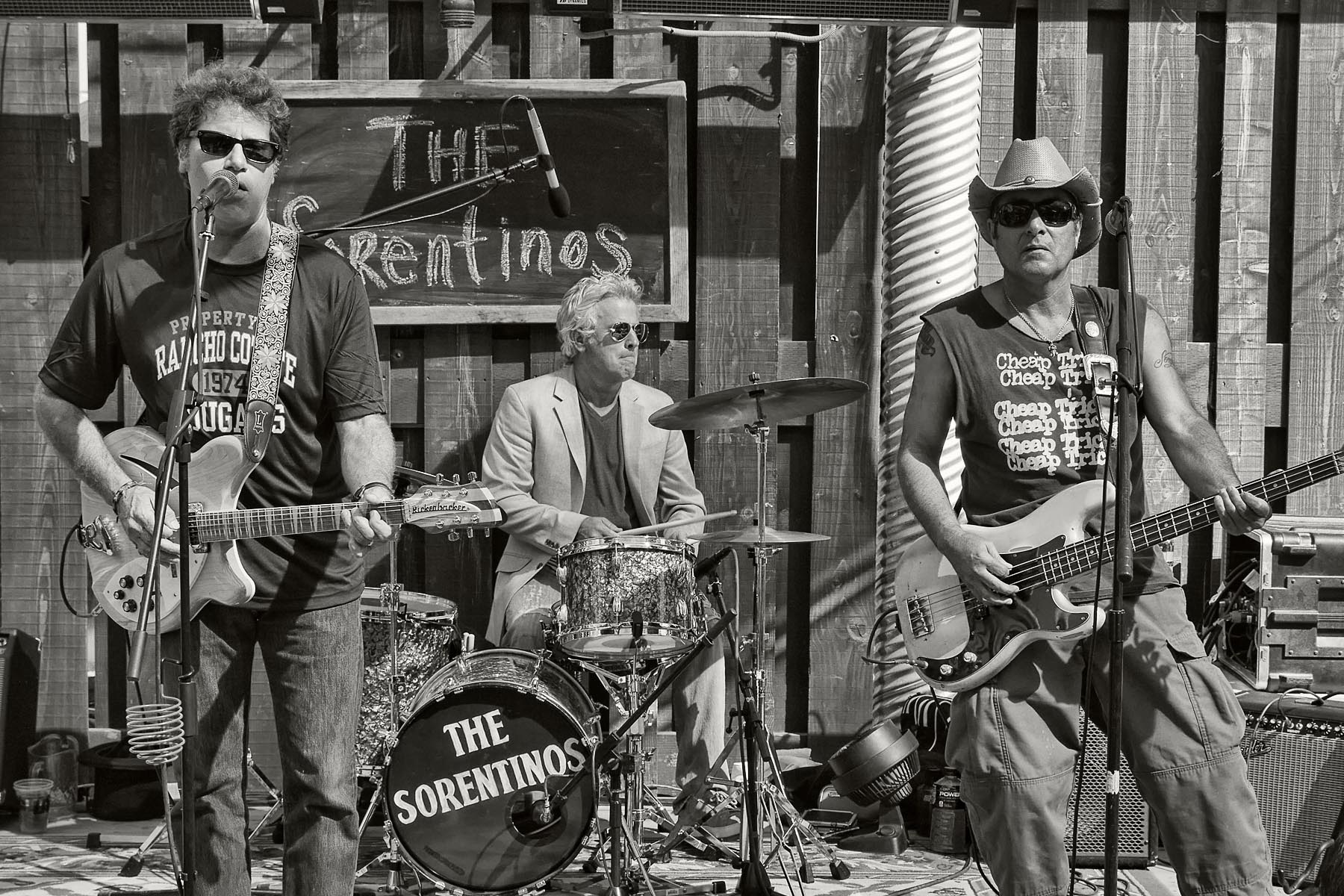
- Left to right: Danny Sorentino, Rory Judge, Rob Ruiz (c. 2014)

Background information
- Origin: Sonoma County, California
- Genre: Rock music
- Years active: 1985–present
- Label: The Major Label
- Members: Danny Sorentino; Rob Ruiz; Rory Judge; Steve Barbieri; Russ Kerger; Steve Lee
- Past members: Howard Vatcher; Dave Carlson; Dean Johnson; Gary Reynolds; Chris Paulsen; Vinnie Malone; Kenny Susan others listed below
- Website: www.thesorentinos.com

The Sorentinos are an American rock music band based in Sonoma County, California, formed in 1985. The main members are Danny Sorentino (lead vocals, guitar, harmonica), Rob Ruiz (bass guitar, backing vocals), Rory Judge (drums), Steve Barbieri (lead guitar, backing vocals), Russ Kerger (keyboards), and Steve Lee (lead guitar, backing vocals).

Danny Sorentino, by his own estimation, has written about 1,000 songs. The Sorentinos, including solo albums and side projects by Danny Sorentino, have recorded 30 albums. They have performed thousands of gigs, mostly in the greater San Francisco Bay and North Bay Areas, but also throughout California and the United States, and have toured in the United Kingdom as well. They have performed as an opening act for dozens of well-known artists.

== History ==
Danny Sorentino was born in 1955 in San Francisco, and grew up in the Excelsior District. He moved to Petaluma (Sonoma County) in 1970. He graduated from Rancho Cotate High School in Rohnert Park (Sonoma County), and studied at Santa Rosa Junior College (Santa Rosa, California). He started playing the guitar at age 17, and wrote his first song in 1975. Danny has worked as a longshoreman in the San Francisco Bay Area since 2004, and is a member of the ILWU. He and his wife have three grown children and four grandchildren. Danny was the founder and lead singer of the rock band The Chills, a precursor band to The Sorentinos.

Prior to forming The Chills, Danny Sorentino was a member of the Billy C. Farlow Band from 1979 to the end of 1980. Billy C. Farlow is the former lead singer of Commander Cody and His Lost Planet Airmen.

Danny Sorentino formed The Chills in 1981. The initial line-up included Danny Sorentino (lead vocals, guitar, harmonica), Steve Barbieri (lead guitar, backing vocals), Rick Escalante (bass guitar), and Ed Bale (drums). Ellery King took over the bass chair for about nine months, and then Julia Farey (later of the band Big Trouble) took over bass duties for about six months before Rob Ruiz joined as the permanent bass player.

Rob Ruiz was born in Oakland, California, and grew up in Concord, California. Rob worked as a park ranger with Marin County Parks for 36 years, and retired in 2018. Rob played with the Eureka, Humboldt County-based power trio Rolls Rock. Rolls Rock toured nationally in the late 1970s and early 1980s, and opened shows for many well-known acts. After Rolls Rock disbanded, Rob played with the rock band The Bats.

Danny Sorentino and Rob Ruiz met at the Mabuhay Gardens nightclub in San Francisco in 1985 when they were with separate bands, The Chills and The Bats, respectively, that shared the same bill one night. (The Chills and The Bats were San Francisco Bay Area-based bands, unrelated to the New Zealand-based Dunedin sound bands of the same names, The Chills and The Bats, respectively.) Rob joined forces with The Chills in 1985, and has been a Sorentino ever since.

The next line-up included Danny Sorentino (lead vocals, guitar, harmonica), Steve Barbieri (lead guitar, backing vocals), Rob Ruiz (bass guitar, backing vocals), Dave Carlson (lead guitar, backing vocals), and Dean Johnson (drums). Dave Carlson is also a long-time member of the Marin County-based band Tazmanian Devils.

Shortly after Rob Ruiz joined The Chills in 1985, the band recorded its first single, "Heart Of America" b/w "I Surrender". At this point The Chills morphed into Danny Sorentino And The Sinners, and Steve Barbieri and Dave Carlson left the band, and Gary Reynolds took over the lead guitar spot, which made the line-up Danny Sorentino (lead vocals, guitar, harmonica), Rob Ruiz (bass guitar, backing vocals), Gary Reynolds (lead guitar, backing vocals), and Dean Johnson (drums).

This line-up lasted for about three years, and was in many ways the "classic" line-up. During this time the band did most of their auditions for music industry A&R executives in Los Angeles, and it was during this time that the band was named one of the best unsigned bands in the country by the New Music Seminar (music conference and festival), and they performed at the New Music Seminar in New York City in 1987.

In 1988 the band signed with Centerfield Management, and in 1989 they recorded their first studio album Danny Sorentino And The Sinners, at which point Chris Paulsen replaced Dean Johnson on drums.

Howard Vatcher (lead guitar) is from Eureka, California, and played with the rock bands Mister Science and Stereotactics prior to joining The Sorentinos. During that time, Howard met Rob Ruiz when Rob was playing for Rolls Rock. Sometime later when Howard relocated to the San Francisco area, Rob asked Howard to join The Sorentinos. Howard and his twin brother Don have also released several albums of their own music, as members of the San Francisco Bay Area-based electronic rock duo The Vatcher Brothers. Howard left The Sorentinos in 2014.

Rory Judge (drums) moved to the west coast from Boston. He is a veteran of the San Francisco music scene of the late 1970s and early 1980s, and has played with a wide variety of bands from punk to polka, and has played with the jazz band On The Air and the roots rock trio The GoldDiggers, and with many local and national jazz musicians, including Howard Alden. Rory Judge is also the owner and executive director of Adventure Camps.

Steve Lee (lead guitar) is from San Mateo, California, and joined The Sorentinos in 1994. After being with The Sorentinos for many years in the San Francisco area, Steve relocated to London, England. Though far away, he continues to occasionally record and perform with The Sorentinos. Prior to joining The Sorentinos, Steve played with the rock bands Paradox and Moscow (San Francisco area-based bands). One of his career highlights was opening for Peter Green at the Fillmore West. Steve is also the co-producer of The Sorentinos 2005 U.K. Jumping Bat Tour documentary.

Steve Barbieri (lead guitar) is from Healdsburg, California. He had been playing with the band Whiplash & The Lawsuits when he first auditioned to join The Chills. Steve has played on several of The Sorentinos albums, and has been in the current live line-up since Howard Vatcher left the band in 2014. Steve is also a member of Sonoma County-based band Soul Fuse, and also plays with North Bay-based band Solid Air and with blues legend Nick Gravenites. He has been a part of the Sonoma County music scene for over 30 years, and has been involved in numerous bands and recording projects.

Russ Kerger (keyboards) is from Colma, California. He has played on most of The Sorentinos albums since the first Danny Sorentino solo album So Low, and he has been in the current live line-up since 2014. Russ is also a member of western Sonoma County-based band The THUGZ (tribal hippie underground zone).

The Sorentinos had a few songs in the 1996 TV movie Co-ed Call Girl, the 1995 movie Lover's Knot, the 1996 movie Follow The Bitch, the 2011 documentary Worst In Show, and also in the TV series Beverly Hills, 90210 and Melrose Place in various episodes in the 1990s. They have appeared in music videos on cable TV channel MTV in the 1980s, and have had radio airplay on northern California radio stations such as KRCB-FM, KRCG-FM, KRSH, and KSRO.

Danny Sorentino has recorded five solo albums (supported by members of The Sorentinos and guest musicians), and two country-flavored albums as Lucky Buck And The Winners, and a new wave vibe one-off album as Popular Beat Combo.

Rob Ruiz is also a member of the San Francisco Bay Area-based power trio The Beer Scouts. This trio includes Rob Ruiz (bass guitar, vocals), Howard Vatcher (guitar, vocals), and Kenny Susan (drums, vocals).

== Musical style and influences ==
The Sorentinos play a wide variety of styles within the rock music genre, including rock and roll, Americana, blues rock, country rock, folk rock, roots rock, rockabilly, with influences from blues, British blues, R&B, country, folk, jazz, Latin rock, psychedelic rock, and many others. Their musical influences include The Beatles, The Rolling Stones, the San Francisco Sound, The Kinks, The Who, Led Zeppelin, The Doors, Johnny Cash, Bob Dylan, Van Morrison, and many others. Many of these musical artists have been reverently name-checked in the lyrics of many of The Sorentinos songs.

== Legacy ==
Marin Independent Journal music critic Paul Liberatore wrote: "[The Sorentinos] should get some kind of an award for maintaining their energy and enthusiasm for as long as they have, churning out albums with first-rate original songs like clockwork, becoming one of the North Bay’s most respected, creative and enduring groups."

== Members ==
=== Current members ===
- Danny Sorentino — lead vocals, guitar, harmonica, ukulele, bass, keyboards (1981-1985 w/ The Chills; 1985-present w/ The Sorentinos)
- Rob Ruiz — bass guitar, 8-string bass guitar, 12-string bass, acoustic bass guitar, backing vocals (1985–present)
- Rory Judge — drums, percussion (1999–present)

=== Semi-regular members ===
- Steve Barbieri — lead guitar, backing vocals (1981-1985 w/ The Chills; 1999-present w/ The Sorentinos)
- Russ Kerger — keyboards, organ, piano, saxophone (1999–present)

=== U.K. auxiliary member ===
- Steve Lee — lead guitar, 12-string guitar, backing vocals (1994–present)

=== Former members ===
- Howard Vatcher — lead guitar, backing vocals (1990-2014)
- Dave Carlson — lead guitar, backing vocals (1981-1985 w/ The Chills)
- Dean Johnson — drums (1981-1985 w/ The Chills; 1985-1999 w/ The Sorentinos)
- Gary Reynolds — lead guitar, backing vocals (1985-1999)
- Chris Paulsen — drums (1989-1999)
- Vinnie Malone — drums, percussion (1990-1999)
- Kenny Susan — drums, percussion, bass, backing vocals (1999-2018)
- Rick Escalante — bass guitar (early 1980s w/ The Chills)
- Ed Bale — drums (early 1980s w/ The Chills)
- Ellery King — bass guitar (early 1980s w/ The Chills)
- Julia Farey — bass guitar (early 1980s w/ The Chills)
- Peter Young — lead guitar (died at age 48)

=== Session musicians ===
The following is a list of session musicians who have appeared on one or more of the Sorentinos albums (includes albums recorded as The Sorentinos, as Danny Sorentino, as Lucky Buck And The Winners, as Danny Sorentino And The Sinners, and as Popular Beat Combo), and/or who have performed with one or more of the Sorentinos live line-ups. Further details can be found on the liner notes of the albums.

- Allegra Broughton (vocals)
- Andre de Channes (guitar)
- Angela Strehli (vocals)
- Ben Sudduth (cello)
- Cedric Willmont (drums)
- Darla Little (backing vocals)
- Dave Zirbel (steel guitar, pedal steel guitar)
- Dennis Hadley (accordion)
- Doug Jayne (guitar, backing vocals)
- Gary Silva (drums)
- Gene Cornelius (cello)
- Gus Garelick (violin)
- Harry Gale (guitar, bass guitar, backing vocals)
- Ian Brenchley (drums)
- Jack Jacobsen (keyboards)
- Jami Jamison (backing vocals)
- Jeff Taylor (clarinet)
- John Burr (keyboards)
- John Salz (lead guitar, vocals, trumpet)
- Kay Irvine (vocals)
- Kent Fossgreen (bass guitar, double bass, vocals)
- Kevin Russell (Dobro guitar, mandolin)
- Kris Wilkinson (backing vocals)
- Layne Bowen (mandolin)
- Mark Baum (percussion)
- Mark Borden (drums)
- Markie Sanders (bass guitar)
- Mooka Rennick (bass guitar)
- Nikki Lyon (backing vocals)
- Paul Lupus (acoustic guitar)
- Paul Manousas (organ)
- Ralph Bryan (backing vocals)
- Rick Clifford (tenor saxophone)
- Rick Cutler (drums, percussion)
- Robert Malta (bass guitar, vocals)
- Sheila Groves (backing vocals)
- Terry Keady (lead guitar)
- Tim Burgess (drums, percussion)
- Tim Haggerty (bass guitar, keyboards)

== Discography ==
The Sorentinos, including solo albums and side projects by Danny Sorentino, have recorded 30 albums (2 EPs). All albums and tracks are on The Major Label and published by Golden Guinea Music, administered by Bug Music (BMI) (unless otherwise indicated). All songs were written by Danny Sorentino (unless otherwise indicated). All album cover artwork since the album What We Dream (1995) was done by Joe Groma. Many of these albums have been reviewed in various articles and on various websites. Track listings for these albums can be viewed on The Sorentinos website, and on AllMusic, Amazon, and YouTube.

=== Albums and EPs ===
==== as The Sorentinos ====
- Obviously Five Believers (1993, first CD)
- What We Dream (1995)
- Welcome To The Past (1996)
- Family (1997, double album)
- All Good Things (1999)
- The End Of The Day (2001)
- Love And Haight: A Retrospective, Vol. One (2003, compilation)
- Way Out (2005)
- Volume 10 (2007)
- If Not Now When? (2009)
- Leftovers, Vol. One, 1985-1990: Songs Of Sin And Shame (2009)
- Leftovers, Vol. Two, 1991-2007: Should've Beens That Never Were (2011)
- Blues Century Twenty One (2012)
- Rock Bop Rhythm & Blues (2013)
- The Sorentinos Christmas EP (2013, EP)
- San Francisco Sound (2014)
- Rock And Roll Beat (2015)
- Sonic Narcotic (2018)
- Home (2021)
- If All Goes Well (2022)
- I'm From California, Baby! (2025, EP, digital only)

==== as Danny Sorentino ====
- So Low (2001)
- Four Chord Wonders (2002)
- Sonoma County Sweet (2010)
- Danny Sorentino Sings And Then Doesn't (2016)
- Myth Of The Circus (2023)

==== as Lucky Buck And The Winners ====
- The Uncomplicated Mind Of Lucky Buck (2008)
- The Buck Stops Here (2018)

==== as Danny Sorentino And The Sinners ====
- Danny Sorentino And The Sinners (1989, first vinyl LP record)

==== as Popular Beat Combo ====
- Popular Beat Combo: The Singles (2017)

=== Singles and individual songs ===
The following is a list of singles, previously unreleased tracks on compilations, and individual songs on various artist compilations (VAC):

- "Heart Of America" b/w "I Surrender" — single, The Chills (1985)
- "Heaven" — used in the movie Co-ed Call Girl, The Sorentinos (1996) (also on Obviously Five Believers)
- "Diamonds In Your Mind" — track 14 from Bob Harris Presents, Vol. 3 (VAC), The Sorentinos (2001, Assembly Records) (also on The End Of The Day)
- "Breathe" and "Pete Best Blues" — previously unreleased tracks on Love And Haight: A Retrospective, Vol. One (2003)
- "In The Way Of Love" — track 7 from Connections 2 (VAC), Danny Sorentino (2004, Jackalope Records) (also on So Low as "Way Of Love")
- "Sonoma County Stars" — track 7 from Real Music: A Taste Of Sonoma County Music, Vol. 1 (VAC), Danny Sorentino (2010) (also on Sonoma County Sweet)
- "Worst In Show" — single (used in the movie Worst In Show), Danny Sorentino (2011)
- "Too Much Fun" (Billy C. Farlow, Bill Kirchen) — track 6 from Sonoma County Covers Project (VAC), Danny Sorentino (2015, Jackalope Records)
- "Beatnik Christmas" — track 9 from Holiday Connections 2016 (VAC), The Sorentinos (2016, Jackalope Records) (also on The Sorentinos Christmas EP)
- "I'm Not Ready (For A World Without Tom Petty)" — single, The Sorentinos (2017) (also on Sonic Narcotic as "I'm Not Ready")
- "Start All Over Again" — track 5 from Out Of The Fire (VAC), Danny Sorentino (2018, Prairie Sun Recording Studios)
- "Keep Your Range There Stranger" — single, Lucky Buck And The Winners (2020)
- "Leaders Of The World" — single, Danny Sorentino (2024)

== Live Performances, Tours and Venues ==
The Sorentinos have played thousands of gigs, mostly in bars, cafes, pubs and nightclubs, but also in many larger venues, as well as music festivals and street fairs. They have toured in the United Kingdom several times, including a well-documented tour of England and Scotland in 2005. A 27-minute documentary of this tour was directed, filmed and edited by Dan Ruttley, and produced by Steve Lee and Dan Ruttley. The following is a partial list of some of the notable concerts, festivals and venues in which The Sorentinos have performed.

- Jumping Bat Tour (United Kingdom, 2005)
- The Argyll Arms (Rothesay, Isle of Bute, Argyll and Bute, Scotland)
- The Barrels Ale House (Berwick-upon-Tweed, Northumberland, England)
- Berkeley Community Theatre (Berkeley, CA) (opened for Bob Dylan, May 7 & 8, 1992)
- The Bitter End (Greenwich Village, New York City)
- The Borderline (Soho, London, England)
- Concord Pavilion (Concord, CA)
- The Cotati Cabaret (Cotati, CA)
- Cotati Music Festival (La Plaza Park, Cotati, CA)
- The Duck & Drake (Leeds, West Yorkshire, England)
- The Eight Ball (Cotati, CA)
- Elephant In The Room (Healdsburg, CA)
- The Fillmore (San Francisco) (run by rock promoter Bill Graham)
- Fillmore West (San Francisco) (run by rock promoter Bill Graham)
- Francis Ford Coppola Winery (Geyserville, CA)
- The Freight and Salvage (Berkeley, CA)
- Golden Gate Park (San Francisco)
- Great American Music Hall (San Francisco)
- Haight Ashbury Street Fair (Haight Ashbury, San Francisco)
- The Half Moon (Putney, London, England)
- Healdsburg Plaza (Healdsburg, CA)
- Inn of the Beginning (Cotati, CA)
- HopMonk Taverns (Novato, Sebastopol, Sonoma, CA)
- Jerry Garcia Amphitheatre, (John McLaren Park, San Francisco)
- Lagunitas Brewing Co. (Petaluma, CA)
- Last Day Saloon (Santa Rosa, CA)
- The Last Record Store (Santa Rosa, CA)
- Mabuhay Gardens (Broadway, San Francisco)
- Marin Brewing Co. (Larkspur, CA)
- The Mean Fiddler (London, England)
- The Mountain Winery (Saratoga, CA)
- Mystic Theatre (Petaluma, CA)
- New George's (San Rafael, CA)
- New Music Seminar (New York City, 1987)
- 19 Broadway (Fairfax, CA)
- Novato Festival of Art, Wine & Music (Novato, CA)
- The Prince Albert (Brighton, East Sussex, England, 2008)
- Rancho Nicasio (Nicasio, CA)
- Red Dog Saloon (Virginia City, Nevada)
- Redwood Cafe (Cotati, CA)
- Rohnert Park Farmers Market (Rohnert Park, CA)
- Russian River Brewing Co. (Santa Rosa, CA)
- Sausalito Art Festival (Sausalito, CA)
- Sebastopol Apple Blossom Festival (Sebastopol, CA)
- Smiley's Schooner Saloon (Bolinas, CA)
- Station House Cafe (Point Reyes Station, CA)
- The Stone (Broadway, San Francisco)
- Sweetwater Saloon (Mill Valley, CA)
- Terrapin Crossroads (San Rafael, CA) (founded by Grateful Dead bassist Phil Lesh)
- The 12 Bar Club (London, England)
- Twin Oaks Roadhouse (Penngrove, CA)
- Village Music (record store) (Mill Valley, CA)
- Warfield Theatre (San Francisco) (opened for Bob Dylan, May 4 & 5, 1992)
- The Washoe Club Saloon (Virginia City, NV)

== Openers: The Sorentinos as an opening act ==
The following is a partial list of some of the artists for whom The Sorentinos have performed as an opening act.

- Alex Chilton
- Animal Logic
- Big Brother and the Holding Company
- Bill Kirchen
- Blue Rodeo
- Bob Dylan (May 4,5,7,8, Never Ending Tour 1992)
- Bonnie Hayes
- Box Set
- Bread
- Buck Owens
- Carlene Carter
- Charlie Musselwhite
- Chicago
- Chris Isaak
- Clarence Clemons
- Cowboy Junkies
- Daniel Lanois
- Dave Mason
- David Grisman
- Dwight Yoakam
- Emmylou Harris
- Eric Johnson
- Eric Martin Band
- Graham Parker
- Hootie & the Blowfish
- Huey Lewis and the News
- Iris DeMent
- Jackie DeShannon
- Jeff Beck
- John Hiatt
- John Lee Hooker
- Kenny Wayne Shepherd
- Loudon Wainwright
- Lucinda Williams
- Mick Taylor
- Mink DeVille
- Neal Schon Band
- Night Ranger
- NRBQ
- Paul Collins' Beat
- Paul Kelly and the Messengers
- Paul Rodgers
- Peter Frampton
- Peter Green
- The Bacon Brothers
- The Beat Farmers
- The Blasters
- The Call
- The Classic Rock All-Stars
- The Greg Kihn Band
- The Motels
- The Radiators
- The Spencer Davis Group
- The Tragically Hip
- The Yardbirds
- Tim Rose
- Tommy Castro Band
- Tommy Tutone
- Vain
- Wire Train
- Zero

== Musical Gear ==
A detailed list of the musical gear (musical instruments and audio equipment) used by The Sorentinos can be viewed on the band's website.

== Album Cover Artwork and Photo Gallery ==
Joe Groma has done all the album cover artwork on all Sorentinos albums since the album What We Dream (1995). Images of these album covers can be viewed on The Sorentinos website, and on AllMusic, Amazon, and YouTube. Photographs and videos of the band, including many photos taken with other renowned musicians, can be viewed on The Sorentinos website.
