= Yosemite Creek (San Francisco) =

River in San Francisco, California, United States

Yosemite Creek is a body of water that originates at Yosemite Marsh in San Francisco's McLaren Park. The creek flows downhill towards Candlestick Point, mostly through underground culverts beneath private property and public right-of-way. It terminates in Yosemite Slough.

In 2007, the San Francisco Public Utilities Commission, which manages the city's water, began investigating the possibility of "daylighting" underground portions of the creek. Because the city's Yosemite Basin watershed becomes overburdened during heavy rainfall, daylighting could significantly reduce strain on stormwater infrastructure.
