= Philosopher's Way, San Francisco =

Walking trail

Coordinates: 37.7180842°N 122.4190721°W

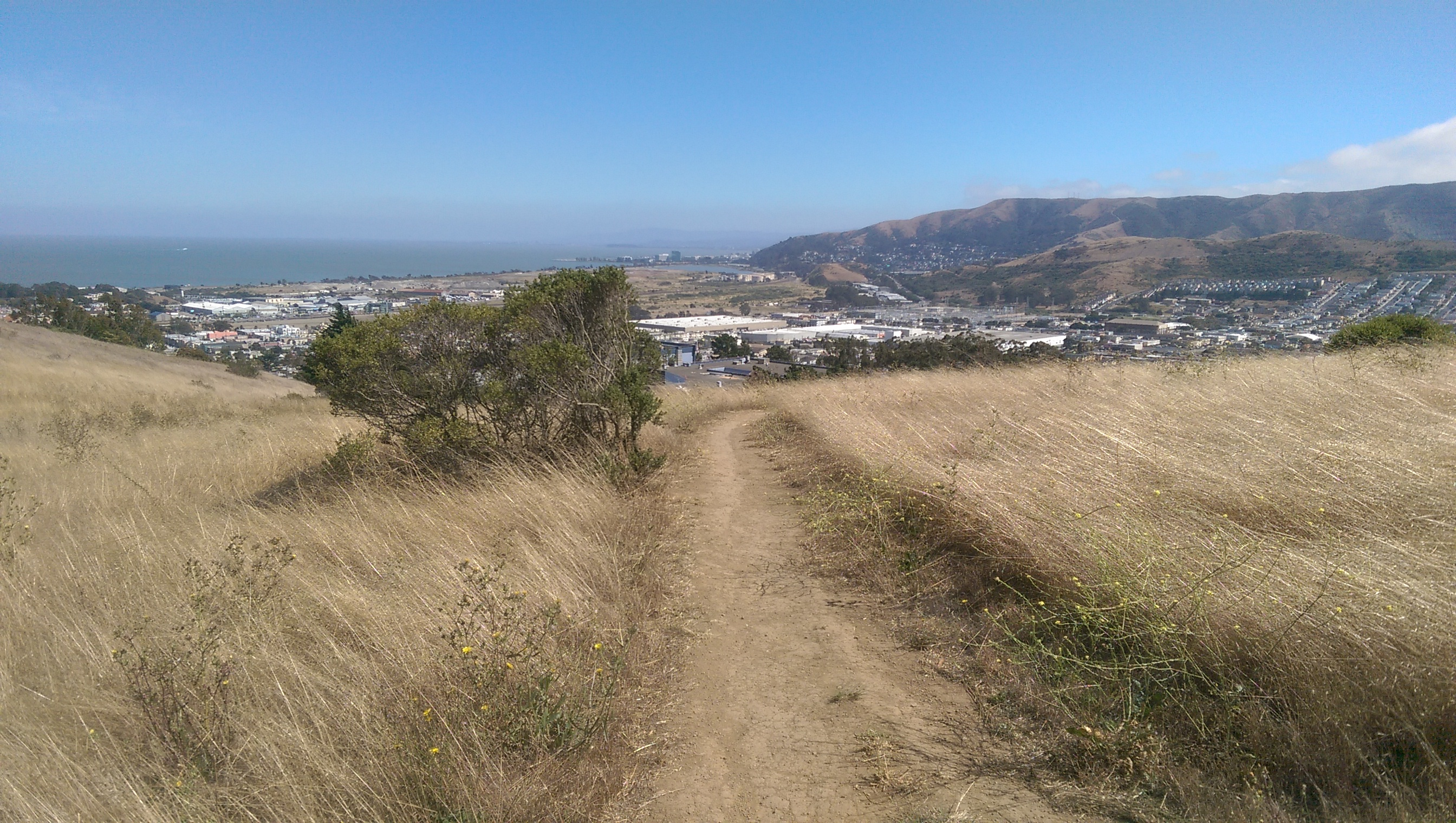
- View from Philosopher's Way toward southeast direction (San Francisco Bay). The nearby valley is Visitacion Valley, San Francisco. The farther ridges belong to San Bruno Mountain State Park. Below the San Bruno Mountain and beside the bay is Brisbane, California.
- Length: 2.7 mi (4.3 km)
- Location: John McLaren Park, San Francisco
- Established: January 5, 2013
- Use: Hiking

Philosopher's Way, San Francisco is a 2.7-mile (4.3 km) loop trail around the perimeter of John McLaren Park created by artists Peter Richards and Susan Schwartzenberg, staff artists at the Exploratorium. The trail, dedicated on January 5, 2013, is the first and only path built for philosophers in the United States and features fourteen stone markers by mason George Gonzalez intended as "musing stations" to stimulate contemplation. The US$146,000 (equivalent to $202,000 in 2025) trail was funded as a public art set-aside by the San Francisco Public Utilities Commission, and offers views of Mount Diablo, Mount Tamalpais, Angel Island, and the Pacific Ocean on a clear day.

== Design and history ==
Selected through a competitive process in 2008, Richards and Schwartzenberg were inspired by the philosopher's walks found in other major cities such as Heidelberg, Toronto and Kyoto. According to the artists, “these are places where poets, philosophers and intellectuals strolled through in conversation, considering the ideas of their times.”

The path was laid out by Richards and Schwartzenberg along existing park trails and new trails added by city agencies and volunteers. During their research, the artists noted that regular park users would only stick to a small portion of the park, hampered in part by poor pedestrian access with no contiguous trail. The trails and musing stations were designed to prompt walkers to notice and think about the local landscape and their place within it. Some of the stations provide commentary, while others draw attention to the park's physical attributes. For example, one station features a bench positioned to look out over a meadow to the ocean, and another includes a stone bowl that catches runoff from the surrounding hills. Richards shaped the bowl from a hexagonal column basalt rock taken from Washington state.

Nathaniel Paluga, McLaren Park's self-appointed Resident Philosopher, conducts regular discussion walks on Philosopher's Way, posing philosophical questions.

=== Musing stations ===
George Gonzalez created the musing stations from rough-edged Sierra granite, using surplus city curbstones warehoused in nearby Hunters Point. Some of the stations include:

- An overview of Philosopher's Way featuring a map of McLaren Park
- A July 1929 photograph of a Visitacion Valley family visiting now-lost Sandy Beach, with a quotation from Esther Salomon
- A photograph of native grasses, with a quotation from Kirra Swenerton
- A quotation from Kitaro Nishida
- A photograph of the greenhouses of the University Mound Nursery, with a quotation from Barry Lopez
- A photograph of a park trail
- Martin Luther King at Cow Palace: A photograph of Martin Luther King Jr. speaking at the Cow Palace in 1964, by George Conklin
- A topographic map overlaid with a quotation from local resident Betty Parshall recalling childhood activities
- A topographic map of southeast San Francisco with a quote from Wendell Berry
- Photographs showing the growth of Visitacion Valley, with a quote from local resident Frank Taylor
- San Bruno Mountain: An aerial photograph of McLaren Park with a quotation from Rabindranath Tagore about butterflies and time
- A map of the northern tip of the San Francisco Peninsula with a quote from Jane Jacobs
- Watershed: A map of the park's watershed by cartographer Ben Pease
- Butterfly: A 'butterfly projection' map showing sea trading routes from San Francisco

== Gallery ==
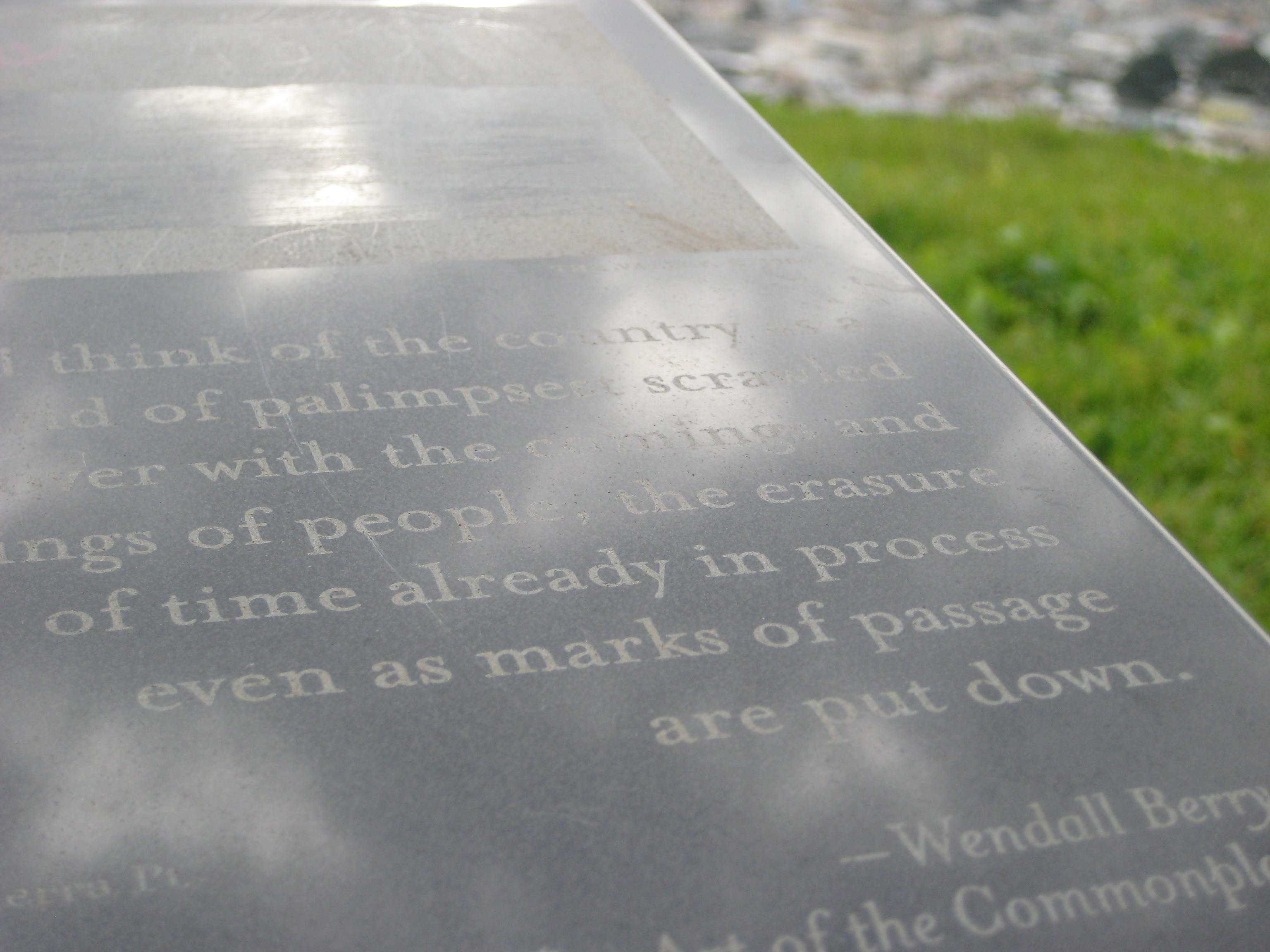
Close-up of "musing station" granite marker with quote from Wendell Berry

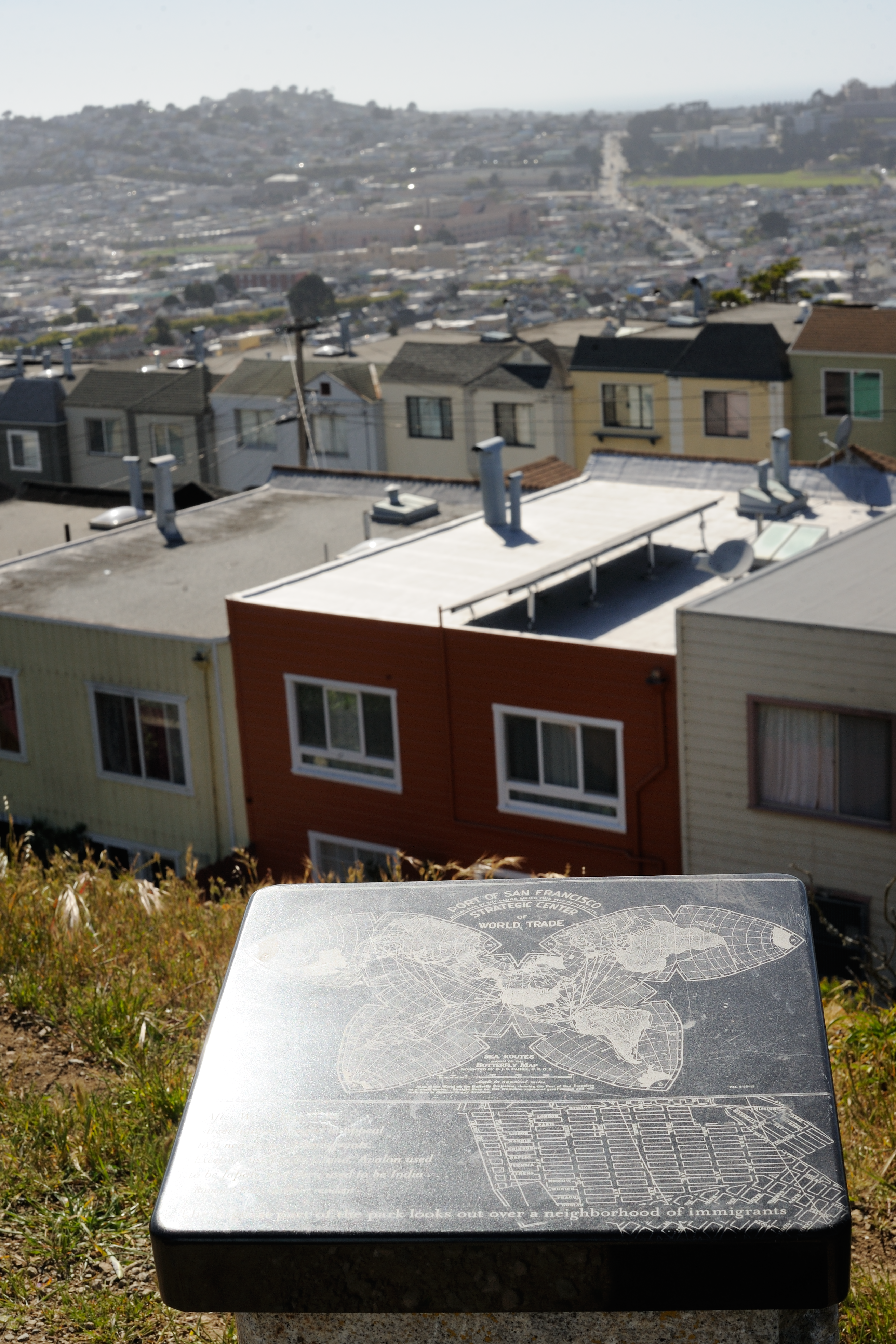
View west to the Excelsior from La Grande Tank, with a "musing station" from Philosopher's Way in the foreground.

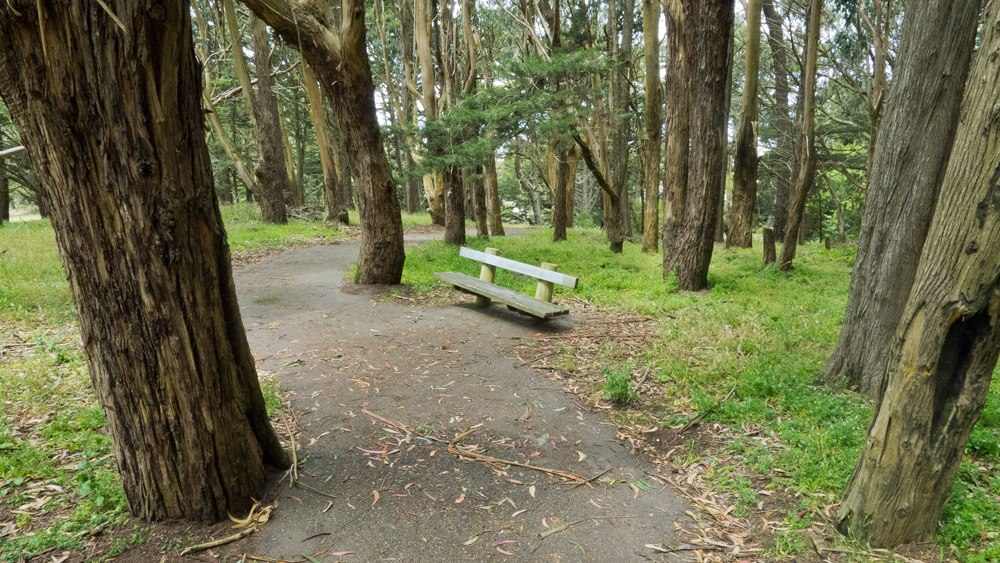
A bench for contemplation on Philosopher's Way, San Francisco
