= Bayview Park, San Francisco =

Park in San Francisco, California

Bayview Park
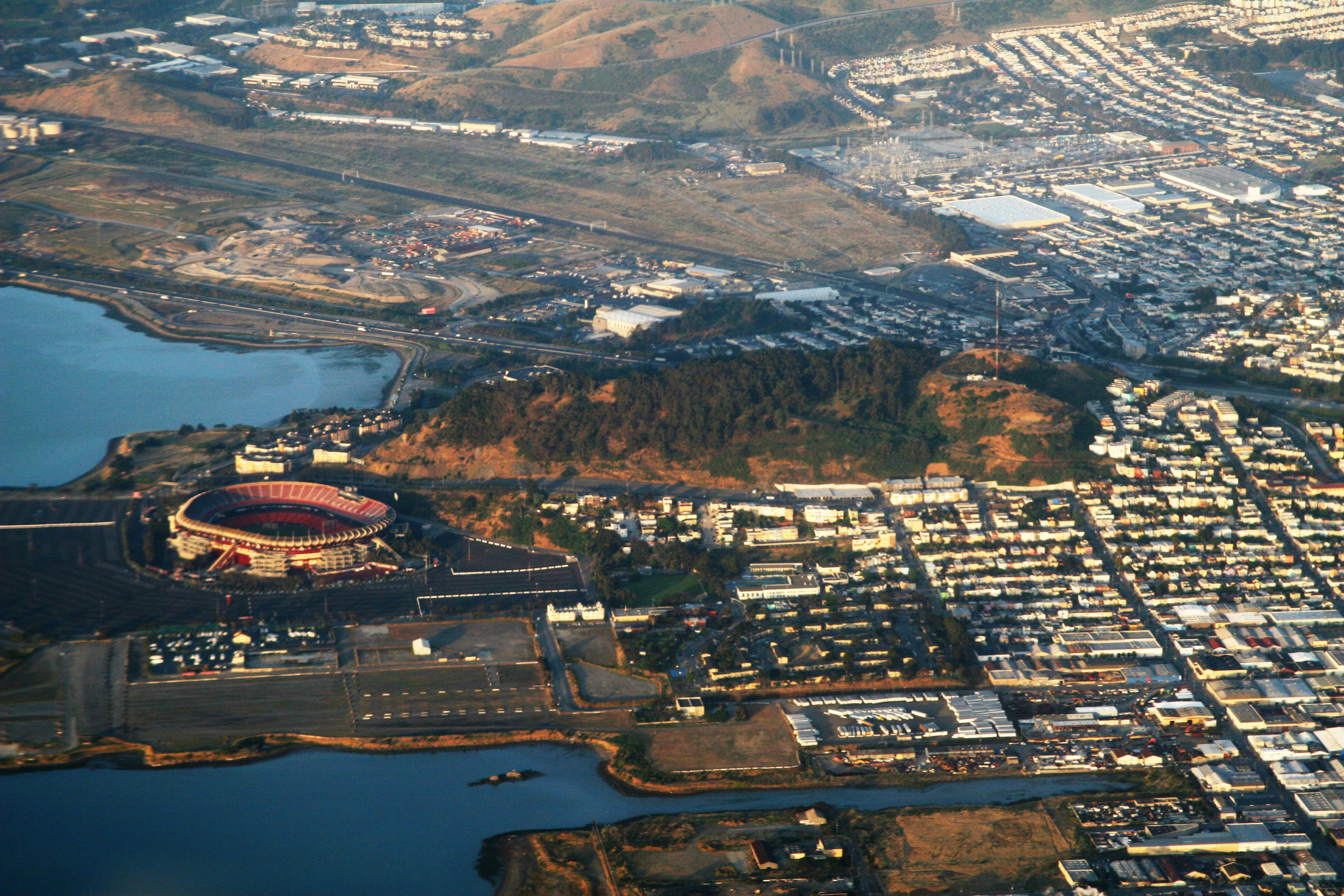
- Bayview Park encompasses the hill immediately behind Candlestick Park
- Interactive map of Bayview Park
- Type: Natural Area (San Francisco)
- Coordinates: 37.7152613°N 122.3926708°W
- Area: 46.63 acres (18.87 ha)
- Created: 1915
- Operator: San Francisco Recreation & Parks Department
- Open: daily, 5am – midnight
- Public transit: Le Conte; Line 8; Bayshore
- Website: sfrecpark.org/destination/bay-view-park/

Bayview Park (sometimes Bay View Park) is a 46.63-acre (18.87 ha) park in the Bayview-Hunters Point neighborhood of southeast San Francisco. The park's land is mainly occupied by a large hill named either Bayview Hill or Candlestick Hill, west of the former site of Candlestick Park and east of the Bayshore Freeway; it is prominently visible from both. The hill was initially proposed as parkland by Daniel Burnham in his 1905 Burnham Plan for San Francisco as Visitacion Park, but the park was not created until 1915. Prior to that, the title to the land was held by the Bay View Land Company, which intended to erect luxury houses on the site. After plans for housing fell through, it was proposed to create a pest house on the site in 1902 until the Crocker Land Company donated adjacent land to the city to block plans for the pest house. KYA (1260 AM) opened a studio and 5000-watt radio transmitter on the hill in 1937, and further development of the area occurred in 1958, when part of the hill was quarried to create fill and land for Candlestick Park. Currently, the park receives relatively few visitors to what is considered one of the best-preserved remnants of pre-Columbian open spaces in San Francisco.

== History ==
Evidence of Native American settlement is given by a shell mound noted in 1910 near present-day Harney Way, just south of Bayview Park, by Nels C. Nelson. Although the mound was leveled during subsequent land development, later auger tests suggest significant and intact shell midden deposits continue to exist below grade. As Nelson noted during a 1910 excavation of the site, the so-called Bayshore or Crocker Mound (designated CA-SFr-07) was the largest of the 10-12 mounds in the Hunters Point area, covering an area of 11,400 square metres (123,000 sq ft) to a depth of 5 metres (16 ft). Nelson's 1910 excavation of 488 cubic metres (17,200 cu ft) of CA-SFr-7 showed the midden contained more than 28 burials.

The hill and land that would become Bayview Park were granted to José Cornelio Bernal as part of the Rancho Rincon de las Salinas y Potrero Viejo by Governor Pro tem Manuel Jimeno in 1839.

=== Park origins ===
The Bay View Land Company was incorporated in 1894 and had offered 95 acres (38 ha) of land to the City of San Francisco in 1897 at a purchase price of US$45,000 (equivalent to $1,740,000 in 2025) for a proposed Mission Park and Zoo. The land had formerly been used for the Bay View racetrack, and the editors of the San Francisco Call noted the parcel was being offered at an inflated price (albeit at only "comparatively moderate" inflation when evaluated against competing offers and parcels), as it had been assessed for only US$25,000 (equivalent to $970,000 in 2025). After plans for Mission Park fell through, the Bay View Land Company began to formulate plans to offer luxury homes on the site, but it was considered too remote from downtown, and the houses were cancelled.

In December 1901, The Bay View Land Company offered an 8-acre (3.2 ha) parcel containing the hill to the City for a smallpox and leprosy pest house at a price of US$8,000 (equivalent to $310,000 in 2025) as an alternative to a politically-controversial parcel then known as the Pattridge (or Partridge) site. The Bay View parcel was considered too remote even for a smallpox hospital, as access would require a new road costing US$5,600 (equivalent to $208,000 in 2025). A committee recommended the Bay View parcel over the Partridge Estate in February 1902 in favor of the Bay View parcel, and money was taken from a planned expansion of the existing hospital. The Board of Health, however, adopted a resolution calling for the Pattridge site in March 1902, saying the existing buildings could be reused and again citing the remoteness of the Bay View parcel.

Despite the need for a new road, the price "frankly admitted by the agent to be double its market price," and the need to build a water supply system and reservoir, the Bay View site was finally chosen over the Pattridge site based on objections from neighbors to the Pattridge site. Based on the budget set aside for the new hospital, the city offered $800 per acre for a 7-acre (2.8 ha) tract, which The Bay View Land Company promptly rejected, saying their minimum price was US$8,000. A third site for the hospital was proposed in April, but eventually The Bay View Land Company agreed to the lower price and the deed for the land was conveyed in December 1902. Although the common narrative is that Charles Crocker donated an adjacent parcel to the City on the condition that plans for the hospital be dropped, Crocker had died in 1888 and his similarly-named son, Charles Frederick Crocker, had died in 1897. Instead, it was the Crocker Land Company which donated the parcel.

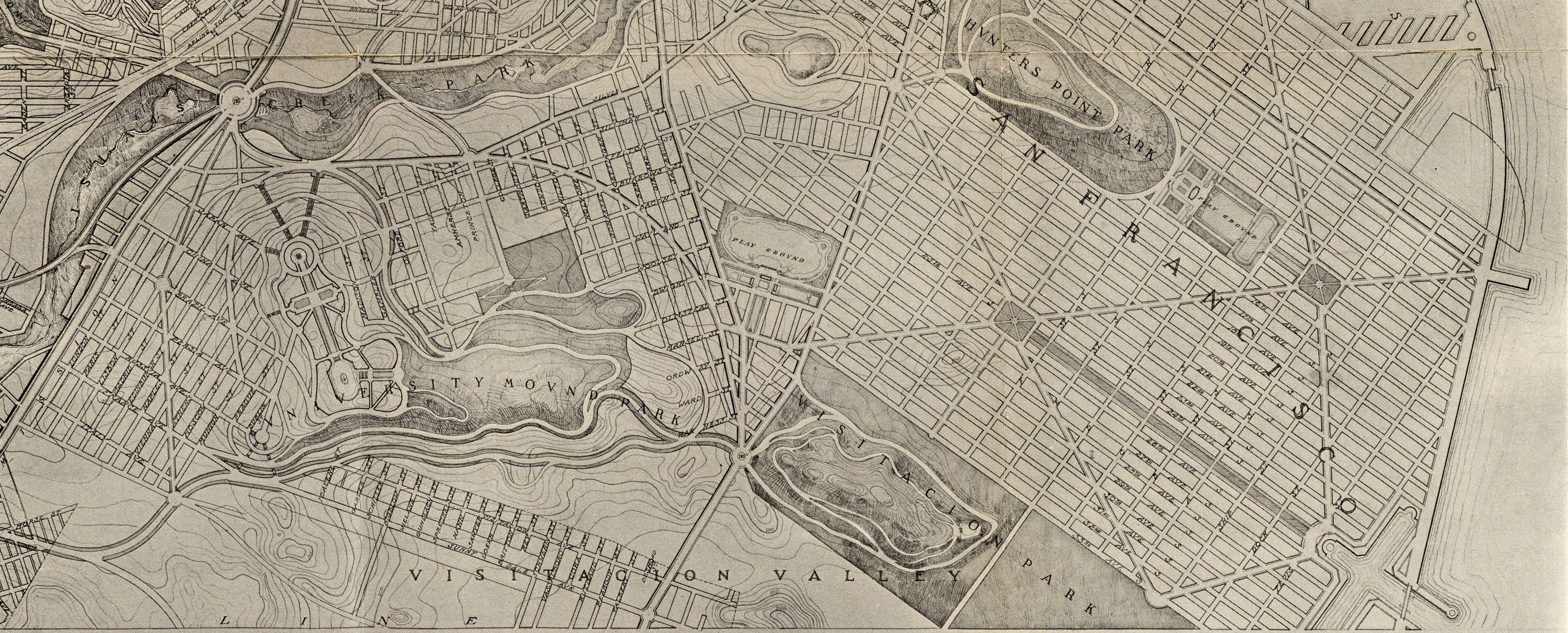
Extract from Burnham's 1905 plan, showing University Mound Park and Visitacion Park along the southern edge of the City.

Burnham proposed the land (from the hill extending to the Bay) should be set aside as a park he named Visitacion Park in a report submitted to the Board of Supervisors in September 1905. In the wake of the April 1906 earthquake and fire, however, Burnham's plans were shelved. The park was created in 1915. Burnham's plans also called for a neighboring University Mound Park, which became John McLaren Park in 1926.

=== Radio station ===
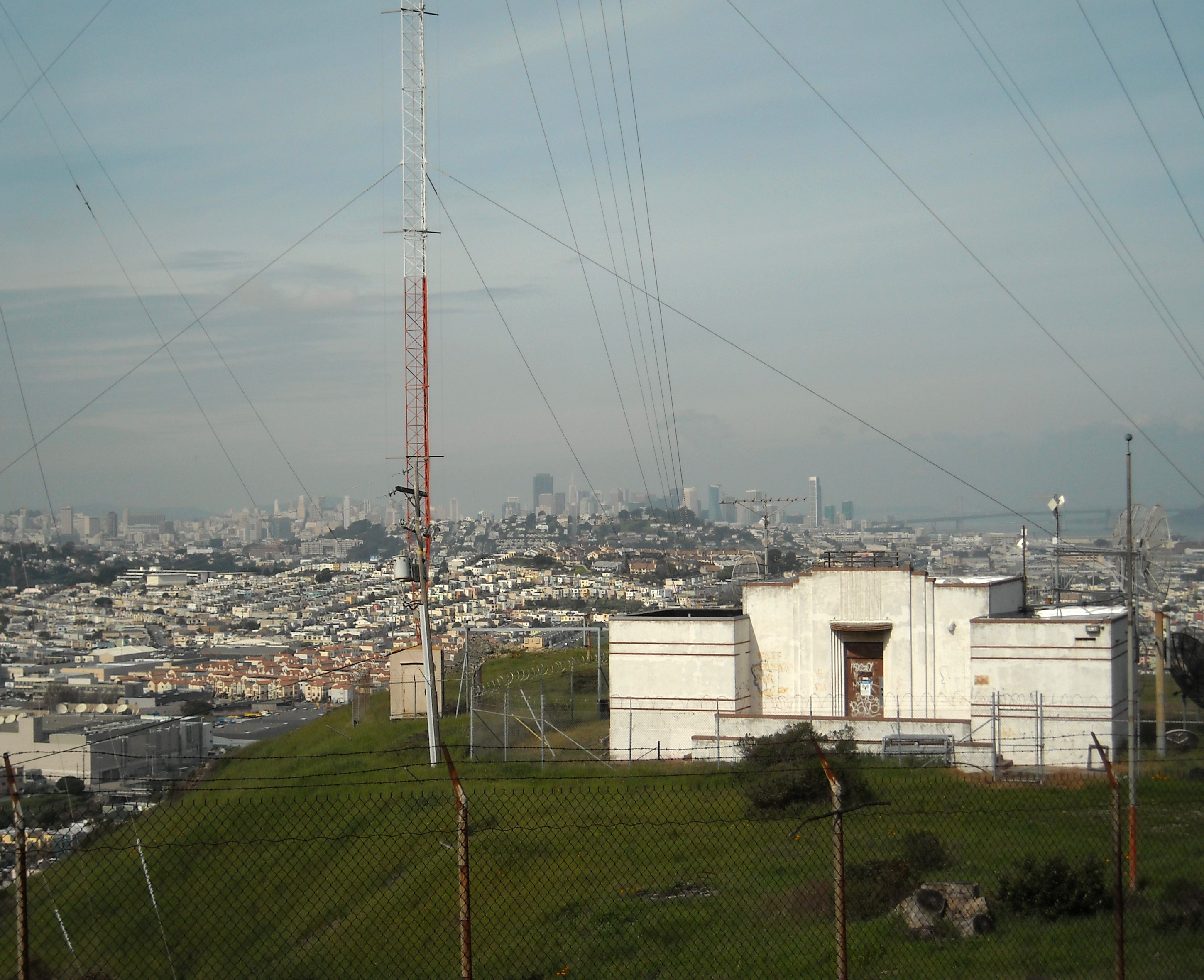
The transmitter for KSFB (former radio station KYA (1260 AM)) is still located at the summit of Bayview Park, housed in a building designed by Julia Morgan.

Radio station KYA was sold to the Hearst Publishing Company in 1934, becoming the full-time voice of the San Francisco Examiner. William Randolph Hearst retained Julia Morgan to design a new transmitter building atop Candlestick Hill, and KYA began broadcasting at an uprated 5,000 watts from the new building and 450-foot (140 m) tall radio tower on June 1, 1937.

=== Quarrying for Candlestick Park ===
The Giants moved from New York to San Francisco in 1958, lured in part by promises from then-Mayor George Christopher to build a new stadium; Candlestick Point was the site chosen, at the prompting of the landowner, Charles Harney, who had previously purchased the land from the City in July 1953. Harney sold the land back to the City in 1957 at a significant profit, with the sale price exceeding 30× his purchase price. Harney had claimed the land was being sold to the city at below-market value as part of the condition that his construction company would be awarded a no-bid contract for the stadium and parking lot. Fill for land reclaimed from the Bay during the construction of Candlestick Park and its parking lot in 1958 was quarried from the north and east slopes of Bayview Hill. Harney, the developer of the Park and lot, said that if the hill had been leveled to a height of 190 feet (58 m), enough fill would be produced to reclaim 250 acres (100 ha) from the Bay. The hill was retained as a natural windbreak to shelter Candlestick Park from strong westerly winds; when the Park opened in 1960, however, the hill instead apparently acted to funnel winds through the stands and field, resulting in the Park's notorious chilly and windy reputation.

During the first 1961 Major League Baseball All-Star Game at Candlestick Park, Stu Miller was charged with a balk after he was caught by a gust of wind; newspaper accounts would later state that he was blown off the mound. As a result, Mayor Christopher later commissioned a study, resulting in a proposal advanced by city planners to cut through the middle of the hill in order to funnel a deflecting wind northward.

=== Recent developments ===
16 acres (6.5 ha) of the hill's northeast slope were added to the site in 1997.

== Park features ==
The sole park access for bicyclists and pedestrians is from the west side of the park, at the eastern end of Key Avenue.

=== Artificial ===
In addition to the 1937 Morgan-designed transmitter building, Works Progress Administration work crews built retaining walls and stairways in the 1930s from local chert which are now in disrepair. The 1 mile (1.6 km) paved loop path to and around the top of the hill serves as an extension of Key Avenue, screened from motorized traffic by a metal gate.

=== Geology ===
The area of Bayview Park is occupied by a single large hill known as either Bayview Hill or Candlestick Hill, which rises to a height of 425 feet (130 m) above sea level. The hill consists of sheared Marin Headlands terrain composed of radiolarian chert, shale, greenstone, and greywacke. Before the hill was quarried to provide fill for the land that became Candlestick Park and its parking lot, the hill directly bordered San Francisco Bay.

The west side of the hill has a notable rock formation known as Indian Head Rock, near the 1937 Morgan transmitter building.

=== Flora ===
A promontory near the summit of the hill contains a stand of Islais cherry trees (Prunus ilicifolia). During spring, several wildflowers bloom lower on the hill in its grasslands which retain many native species such as California goldfields, California buttercup, dwarf checkerbloom, San Francisco blue-eyed Mary, and the California larkspur, the latter two of which are found wild within San Francisco only in Bayview Park.
