= Joe's Cable Car Restaurant =

Former Restaurant in San Francisco, California

- Interactive map of Joe's Cable Car Restaurant

Restaurant information
- Established: 1965
- Closed: 2014
- Location: 4320 Mission Street, San Francisco, California, United States
- Coordinates: 37.72842°N 122.43190°W

Joe's Cable Car Restaurant was a restaurant founded in 1965, and owned and operated by Joe Obegi until 2014. The restaurant was a popular tourists' destination, which was featured on Diners, Drive-Ins and Dives in 2008. Though it was a popular landmark on Mission Street in the Excelsior District of San Francisco, it closed in 2014. As of January 2021, the building that Joe Obegi's restaurant occupied is slated to be demolished.
