= Jerry Garcia Amphitheater =

Outdoor concert venue

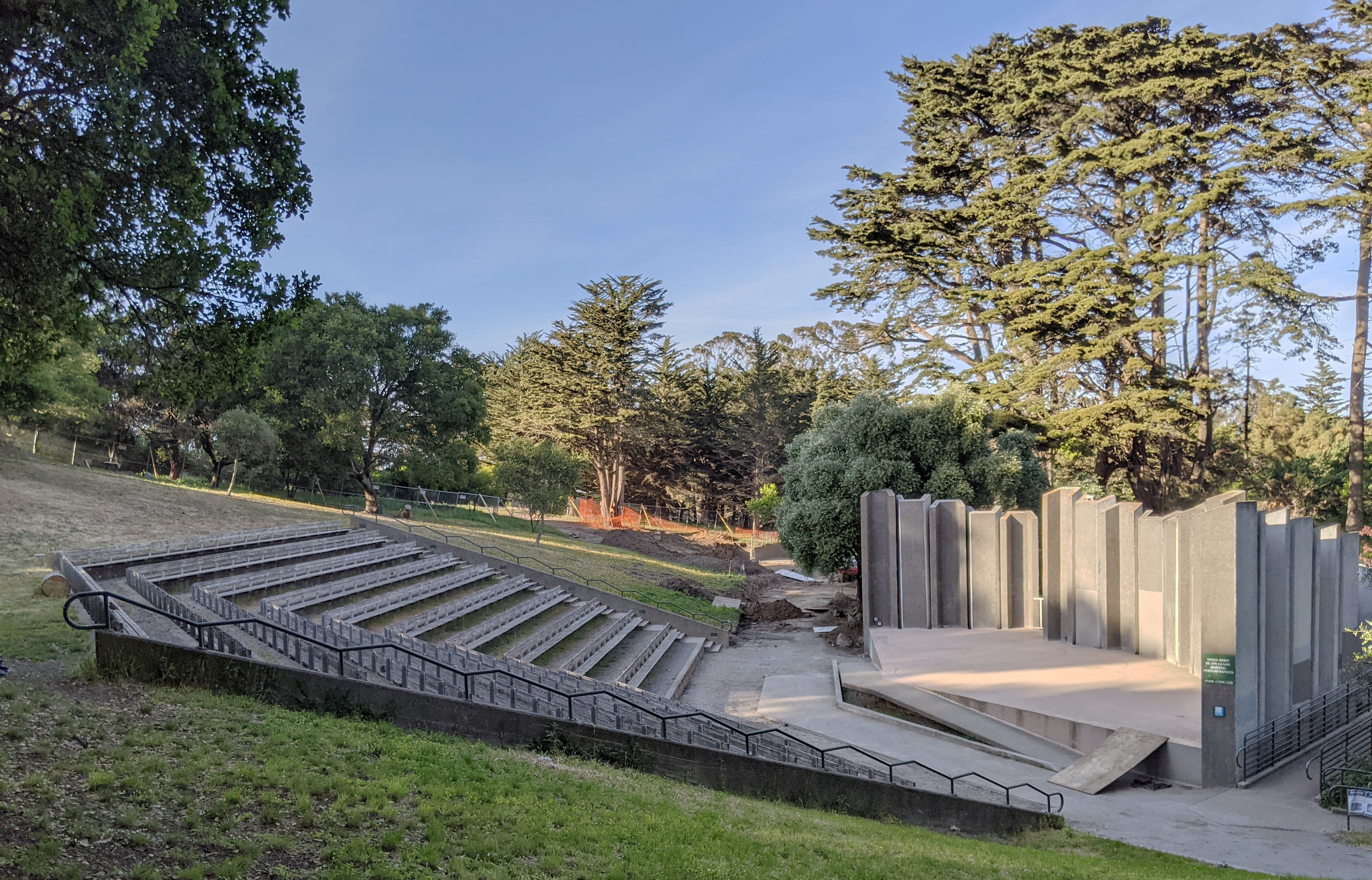
- The amphitheater in 2021
- Interactive map of Jerry Garcia Amphitheater
- Address: John McLaren Park, San Francisco, CA 94134
- Coordinates: 37.7206°N 122.4175°W
- Seating type: chairs and lawn
- Capacity: 1,200
- Type: Amphitheater

Website
- sfrecpark.org/Facilities/Facility/Details/Jerry-Garcia-Amphitheater-421

The Jerry Garcia Amphitheater is an outdoor concert venue located in McLaren Park in San Francisco, California, opened in 1971. Its maximum capacity (as of 2022) is 1,200 people. It is named after Jerry Garcia of the rock band Grateful Dead, and is the site of the annual Jerry Day event, at which various musical groups perform.

== History ==
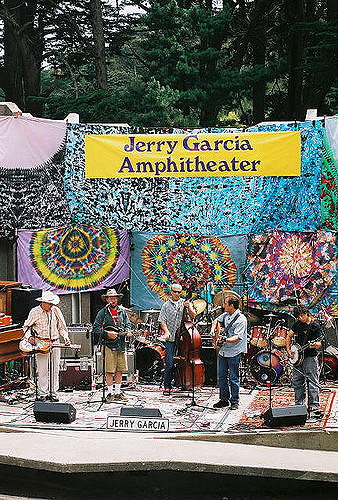
A performance on Jerry Day 2005

The multi-purpose outdoor amphitheater was constructed in 1970 by the San Francisco Recreation Department and named the McLaren Park Amphitheater.

In 1997, it was noted the amphitheater had not seen many shows, possibly because of the limited stage, storage facilities, dressing rooms, and parking.

The first "Jerry Day" celebration on stage in the amphitheater was held in 2003. In July 2005, the San Francisco Recreation and Park Commission passed a resolution officially renaming the venue the Jerry Garcia Amphitheater. Garcia had grown up in the nearby Excelsior District neighborhood not far from the park, at 87 Harrington Street. The amphitheater was officially re-dedicated on 29 October 2005 during a ceremony featuring performances by Jefferson Starship, Jefferson Galactic Family Reunion, Mystery Cats, Grapefruit Ed Acoustic, The Little Wheels Band, Jerry Rigged, Michael John Ahern, David Gans and Ben Fong-Torres.

== See also ==
- List of contemporary amphitheaters
