= Rancho Rincon de las Salinas y Potrero Viejo =

4446-acre Mexican land grant

Coordinates: 37.730°N 122.420°W

Rancho Rincón de las Salinas y Potrero Viejo was a 4,446-acre (17.99 km^{2}) Mexican land grant, largely within present day southeastern San Francisco, California, and extending to San Mateo County, California .

It was given in 1839 by Governor pro tem Manuel Jimeno to José Cornelio Bernal.

The grant consisted of two grants - Rincon de las Salinas ("corner of a salty marsh" - around Islais Creek); and Potrero Viejo ("old pasture" - part of Mission Dolores). Rincon de las Salinas encompassed the present day southern San Francisco neighborhoods of Bernal Heights, Excelsior, Crocker-Amazon, and Outer Mission. Potrero Viejo encompassed present day Bayview and Hunters Point.

== History ==
José Cornelio Bernal (1796–1842), grandson of Juan Francisco Bernal, who was a Spanish soldier on the Anza Expedition, was also to become a soldier and married Maria Carmen Sibrian (1804–) in 1819. José Cornelio Bernal, was regidor (a member of the ayuntamiento, or town council) of San José starting in 1828. In 1834 as secularization of the Missions began, Bernal was granted 6 acres (24,000 m^{2}) at Mission Dolores by Governor José Figueroa. Rancho Rincon de las Salinas was granted in 1839, and Rancho El Potrero Viejo in 1840. José Cornelio Bernal died in 1842, and the grant was inherited by his widow, Carmen Sibrian de Bernal, and their son, José de Jesus Bernal (1829–1870).

With the cession of California to the United States following the Mexican-American War, the 1848 Treaty of Guadalupe Hidalgo provided that the land grants would be honored. As required by the Land Act of 1851, a claim for Rancho Rincon de las Salinas y Potrero Viejo was filed with the Public Land Commission in 1852, and the grant was patented to Carmen Sibrian de Bernal and José Jesús Bernal in 1857.

The family gradually sold off the land. The first portion of the Bernal grant to pass to other hands occurred in 1859, when General William Tecumseh Sherman foreclosed on a mortgage. In the 1860s the rancho was subdivided into small lots, primarily populated by immigrants who farmed the land and ran dairy ranches.

In 1867, George Treat provided testimony at the U.S. Board of Land Commissioners’ that ultimately resulted in the denial of the De Haro family’s longstanding land claims and his action caused the De Haro family to lose their ranch named Rancho Potrero Nuevo, effectively opening another neighborhood (Potrero Hill) for residential and industrial development.

== See also ==
- Ranchos of California
- List of Ranchos of California
