= Excelsior District, San Francisco =

Excelsior District
- Neighborhood of San Francisco
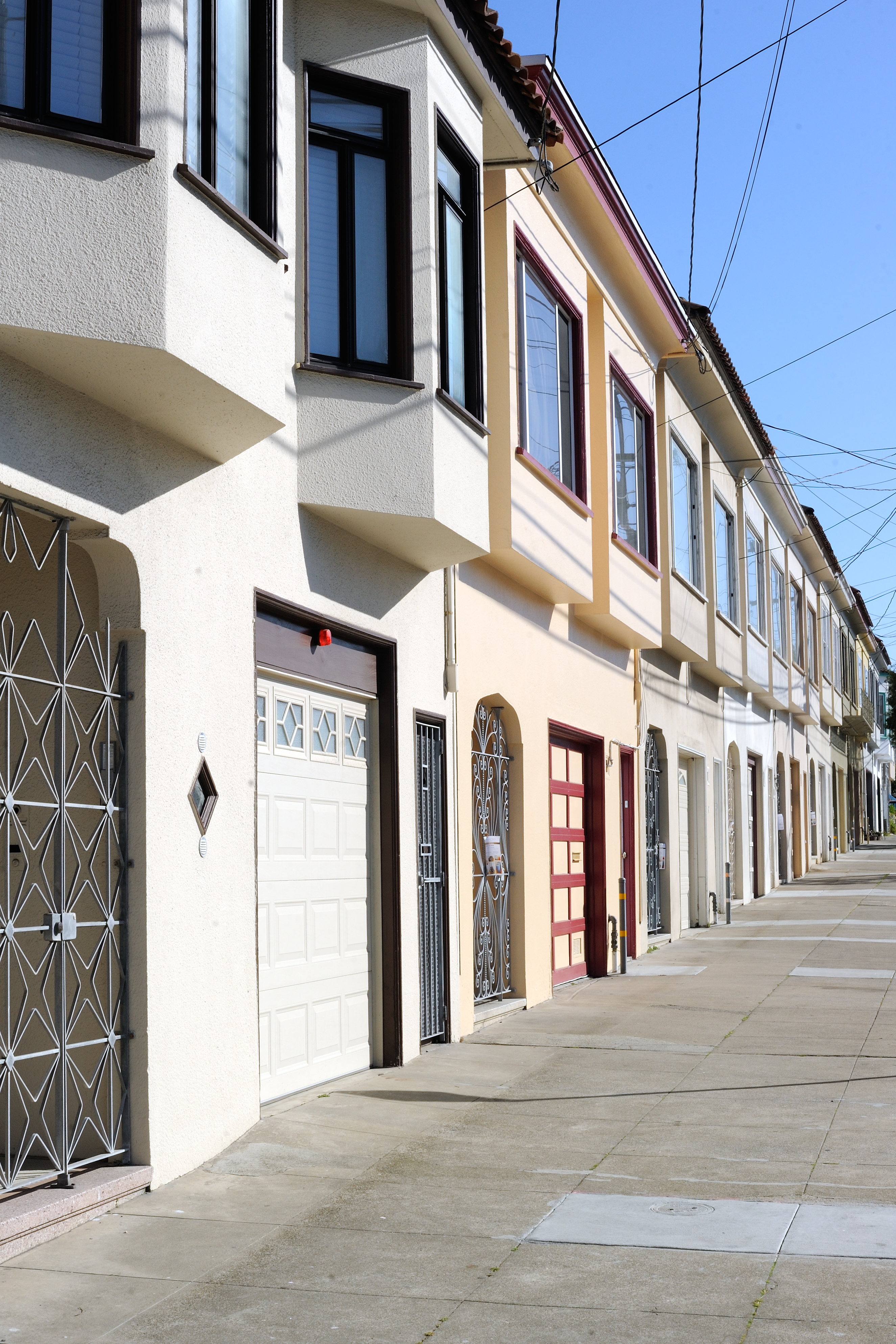
- Row houses in the Excelsior District

- Location within San Francisco
- Coordinates: 37.72058°N 122.43276°W

Government
  - Supervisor: Chyanne Chen
  - Assemblymember: Catherine Stefani (D)
  - State Senator: Scott Wiener (D)
  - U. S. rep.: Kevin Mullin (D)

Area
  - Total: 3.50 km^{2} (1.350 sq mi)
  - Land: 3.50 km^{2} (1.350 sq mi)

Population (2019)
  - Total: 32,552
  - Density: 9,310/km^{2} (24,110/sq mi)
- ZIP Code: 94112, 94134
- Area codes: 415/628

The Excelsior District is a neighborhood in San Francisco, California.

== Location ==
The Excelsior District is located along Mission Street, east of San Jose Ave, south of Interstate 280 Southern Fwy, west of John McLaren Park, and somewhat north of Geneva Avenue.

Areas within the Excelsior District include the Excelsior neighborhood itself, as well as Mission Terrace, Outer Mission, and Crocker Amazon.

== History ==
On April 15, 1869, the Excelsior Homestead was filed at City Hall. The record is in books "C" and "D" and in the book of city maps on page 129. This map section showing the area called the Excelsior can be found in Bancroft's Official Guide Map of City and County of San Francisco. This map indicates that the Excelsior area was previously part of the Rancho Rincon de las Salinas y Potrero Viejo.

Rancho Rincon de las Salinas y Potrero Viejo later became known as Southern San Francisco on city maps, not to be confused with the town of South San Francisco. The Southern San Francisco area referred to everything south and central along with the eastern bent of Mission Street and District. The neighborhood extends to its end at the county line. Over the years, as the southern end of San Francisco was developed, the city created Major neighborhoods & Districts within the area, and these were given names that appeared on city maps. These are: Bernal Heights, Ingleside, The Excelsior District, Visitacion Valley & The Bay View District. As the city grew, The Excelsior District was developed further, and it was split into even smaller sub-neighborhoods useful for Real Estate. Some of these given names are: the Excelsior neighborhood itself, Mission Terrace, Crocker Amazon, Cayuga and the Outer Mission neighborhood. Despite this division into smaller sub-neighborhoods, most of these areas are still referred to as being the Excelsior District today.

Many of the area's streets, those named for the capitals of countries, and its avenues, those that are named for the countries themselves, were done so by Emanuel Lewis and his daughter Jeannette. Emanuel built 200 houses which sold as a result of the 1906 earthquake. On the west side of the district, which is also known as the Mission Terrace, many of the streets were named after American Indian tribes (Mohawk Ave became Seneca Ave for example), and Onondaga, Navajo, Modoc, Ottawa, Oneida, Seminole, and Cayuga are named among the rest. It is evident that many names have been retained, and from the various neighborhoods' inceptions, while some have changed to accommodate changes in political climate. As an example, Excelsior Avenue itself was originally named "China". Likely due to anti-Asian feelings that led to the Chinese Exclusion Act of 1882, India, Japan and China Streets were changed to Peru, Avalon, and Excelsior Streets. To recognize and publish the original street names local neighborhood booster group F.A.C.E. (Friends and Advocates of Crocker-Amazon and the Excelsior) won a 2011 Community Challenge Grant to replace 10 city street signs at intersections on each of these 3 streets which now show both the current and original street names. In 2013 San Francisco Board of Supervisors passed Resolution No. 130655 adding the original street names to the current street signs.

== Demographics ==
In its earlier days, the Excelsior District was predominantly Italian, Irish, and Swiss. During the late 1970s, 80s, and 90s, the Excelsior District, like the Mission District, became predominantly Latino. In the 1980s, the neighborhood became predominantly Latino with the arrival of refugees from Central American wars and immigrants from Mexico. The Excelsior District also has a large Filipino community. For the past two decades the Excelsior District along with neighboring neighborhoods Ingleside, Ocean View, and Visitacion Valley, which were predominantly African American neighborhoods, have become predominantly Asian. Today it is one of the most ethnically diverse districts in San Francisco.

=== Noteworthy residents ===
- Grateful Dead singer/guitarist Jerry Garcia
- Boston Red Sox Hall of Fame shortstop Joe Cronin
- Industrial-rock band Orgy front man Jay Gordon
- Turntablist and composer DJ Qbert
- 1949 world heavyweight contender Pat Valentino
- San Francisco supervisor and political assassin Dan White
- Surrealist poet Philip Lamantia

== Characteristics ==
Central to the neighborhood for quite some time was the landmark Granada Theater, at the intersection of Mission and Ocean. The theater was designed for the Excelsior Amusement Company by architect G. Albert Lansburgh. It was mentioned in several issues of Building and Engineering News in 1921. In 1922 it opened with the name "Excelsior" but was renamed "Granada" in 1931 after the downtown Granada Theater changed its name to the Paramount, freeing up the name. Both the name and a vertical "Granada" sign were deployed in the Excelsior until the theater closed in 1982..The Granada Theatre building is now a Goodwill store and a Walgreens. The theatre's marquee and vertical sign is long gone, but community advocates, led by the Excelsior Action Group (EAG) hope to raise money to install a new vertical sign reading "The Excelsior" to highlight the neighborhood's identity.

Among the various schools in the district is the San Francisco Community Alternative School, a public grade school with a unique 'project-based' curriculum, and the School of the Epiphany

=== 2000s ===
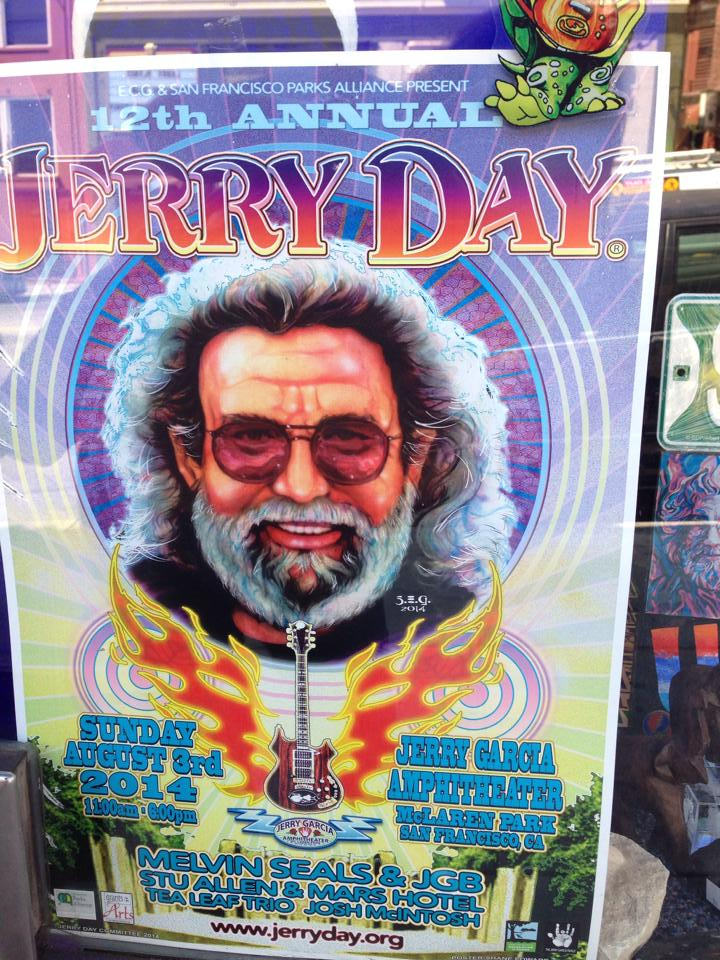
A poster for Jerry Day

Tom Murphy founded Jerry Day in 2002 to celebrate the legacy of Grateful Dead front man and Excelsior native, Jerry Garcia, and fundraise for a neighborhood playground. The Jerry Garcia estate supported the event by donating towards the fund and allowing them to use Garcia's name. The event typically occurs in August at the Jerry Garcia Amphitheatre at John McLaren Park, which is bordered by the Excelsior, Visitacion Valley, and Portola districts. The event draws thousands of residents and Deadheads annually.

In 2002, the Excelsior Festival was created by the Excelsior Action Group. Because the city's public maps omitted (and still do, in some cases) any part of the city below Cesar Chavez, the Festival was created to put the Excelsior District on the map.

In 2008, the San Francisco Giants, led by shortstop and Hall of Famer Omar "Little O" Vizquel, funded the renovation of the Excelsior Playground baseball field and the creation of its new mural, "Coming Together Through Sports". The mural was designed and painted with Precita Eyes Muralists Association artist Cory Calandra Devereaux, Omar Vizquel, and Excelsior community members.

=== 2010s ===
In 2011 the Excelsior Action Group brought SF Sunday Streets to the district to host activities along Mission Street from Silver to Geneva Avenue during the Excelsior Festival. It later became the Excelsior Sunday Streets, taking place each year in the Spring and Fall.

In 2014, Joe's Cable Car Restaurant closed. The restaurant was founded in 1965, and owned and operated by Joe Obegi. The restaurant was a popular tourists' destination, which was featured on Diners, Drive-Ins and Dives in 2008. Nevertheless, Obegi closed the restaurant in 2014. As of January 2021, the building that Joe Obegi's restaurant occupied is slated to be demolished.

The Excelsior District Car Show originated from Jim Espinoza, while working with the neighborhood youth, created an organization called The Excelsior Youth Club. The Car Show, which takes place in Excelsior Playground each year around October, brings together hundreds of locals residents to celebrate the Chicano culture & Irish, Italian roots of the Excelsior District. Displays of low riders and Muscle cars line the street of Madrid, food, vendors, live local rap artist performances all take place within Excelsior Playground. Today, Jim Espinoza, along with some of the members of The Excelsior Youth Club, is memorialized on the wall behind the basketball court in the Excelsior Playground mural. For 2015–2016, Diane Wunderlich, former Secretary of The Excelsior Youth Club, brought the car show back.

=== 2020s ===
Photographer Travis Jensen is currently working on a photo book called "Forever Upward".

In January 2020, SF Heritage Foundation, initiated a new program, "Heritage in the Neighborhoods" focusing on the Heritage in the Excelsior District. SF Heritage is partnering with Excelsior Action Group and the SF Victorian Alliance to jointly identify historic buildings, public artwork, or legacy businesses to raise their profile and significance to avoid losing these gems.

In June 2025 owner Jerry Tonelli announced that Central Drug Store, the oldest retail store in the Excelsior, would be closing on July 15 after 117 years.
