= Cheswill =

Cheswill is a name. Notable people with the name include:

== Given name ==
- Cheswill Johnson (born 1997), South African athlete

== Surname ==
- Hopestill Cheswill (1712–unknown), master housewright in colonial New Hampshire; father of Wentworth
- Wentworth Cheswill (1746–1817), American assessor, auditor, Justice of the Peace, teacher and Revolutionary War soldier

== See also ==
- Cheswell, Shropshire, a hamlet in England
