= Nellie Brown Mitchell =

American singer (1845–1924)

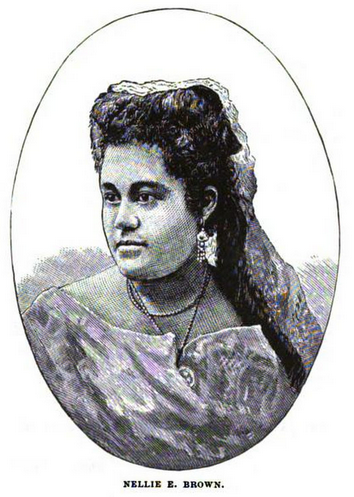
- Mitchell in an 1881 publication

Background information
- Born: Nellie E. Brown; 1845; Dover, New Hampshire, U.S.
- Died: January 5, 1924 (aged 78) Boston, Massachusetts
- Occupations: Singer, music educator
- Spouse: Charles Lewis Mitchell

Nellie E. Brown Mitchell (1845 – January 5, 1924) was an African-American concert singer and music educator.

== Early life ==
Nellie E. Brown was born in Dover, New Hampshire, the daughter of Charles J. Brown (November 15, 1826 - March 20, 1895) and Martha A. Runnels Brown (November 15, 1825 - January 13, 1905). She trained as a singer at the New England Conservatory of Music, earning a diploma in 1879. Her sister Edna Brown Bagnall was also a singer, and sometimes joined her in concerts. Their brother Edward Everett Brown was a lawyer and anti-lynching activist based in Boston.

== Career ==
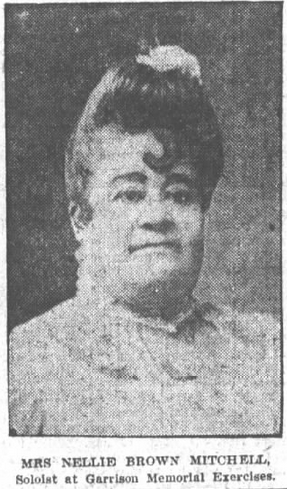
Nellie Brown Mitchell, from a 1905 newspaper.

Nellie Brown Mitchell was a popular singer in churches in New England, and was at one point the lead soprano at four white churches in Boston and the greater-Boston area. Before moving to the Boston area, she served as a soloist at the Free Will Baptist Church in Dover beginning in 1865 and then at the Grace Methodist Episcopal Church in Haverhill, MA beginning in 1872. She performed throughout the New England region, across several southern and mid-western states, as well as in Canada. In 1874 she gave her debut concert at Steinway Hall in New York City.

In the 1880s, Mitchell toured with the Bergen Concert Company. She also formed her own company, the Nellie Brown Mitchell Concert Company. From 1879 to 1886, she was musical director at the Bromfield Street Church in Boston. She sang at the first meeting of the National Negro Business League, in Boston in 1900. In 1879, Nellie sang at the funeral of abolitionist William Lloyd Garrison and was a soloist at the observance of his centennial in 1905.

Mitchell was head of the vocal department at Hedding Academy in New Hampshire. In 1876, she conducted a group of 50 girls in a cantata, Laila, the Fairy Queen, as part of the Centennial Musical Festival in Boston. After she retired from touring, she taught voice techniques to African-American women students in Boston. In 1909, she organized and hosted the first meeting of the Chaminade Musical Club, for "the leading women musicians" of Boston, named for French composer Cécile Chaminade.

Mitchell also invented the "phoneterion", a device meant to help train proper tongue position for vocal students.

In July of 2023, the Black Heritage Trail of New Hampshire unveiled a historical marker at the entrance to the Pine Hill Cemetery in Dover, New Hampshire, highlighting the contributions of Mitchell and her brother Edward. The marker unveiling was part of a larger effort, Mapping Untold Stories, aimed at highlight the history of Black people in New Hampshire.

== Personal life ==
Nellie E. Brown married Lieutenant Charles Lewis Mitchell in 1877. He enlisted in 1863 as a member of the 55th Massachusetts Infantry Regiment, which consisted of African-American soldiers who fought during the American Civil War. He fought at the battle of Honey Hill in South Carolina, where he was severely wounded on Nov. 30, 1864 losing his right foot. Charles was one of the first two African-American members of the Massachusetts legislature, along with Edward G. Walker. Nellie Brown Mitchell was widowed in 1912, and she died in Roxbury on January 5, 1924, aged 78 years.
