= Edward Everett Brown =

American lawyer, civil rights activists (1858–1919)

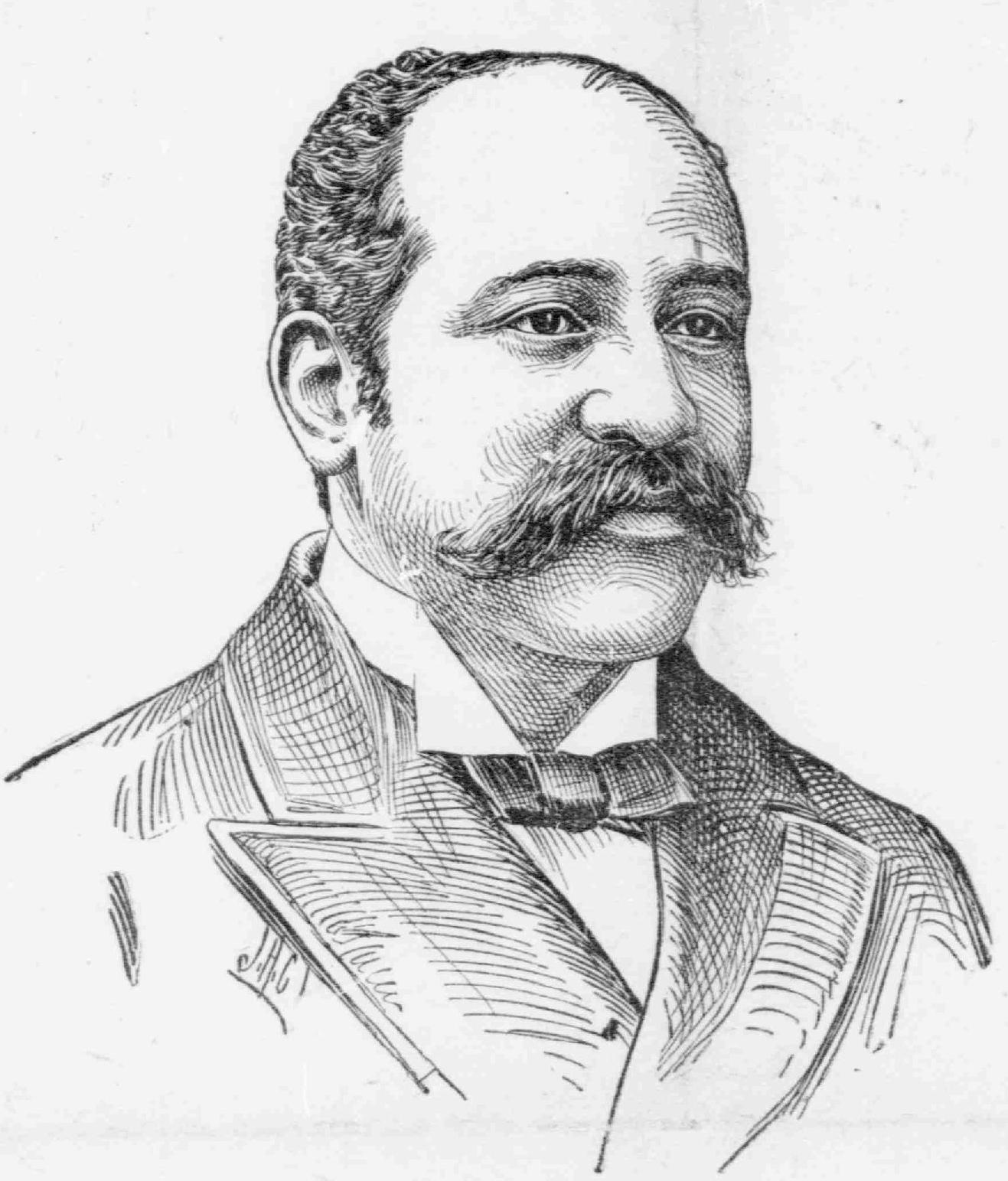
- Born: 1858; Dover, New Hampshire, United States
- Died: January 14, 1919 (aged 60–61); Boston, Massachusetts, United States
- Burial place: Pine Hill Cemetery, Dover, New Hampshire, United States
- Education: Dartmouth College, Boston University School of Law
- Occupations: Lawyer, author, orator, civil servant
- Relatives: Nellie Brown Mitchell (sister)

Edward Everett Brown (1858 – January 14, 1919) was an African-American lawyer, author, civil servant, and orator in Boston, Massachusetts. In 1899, he helped draft anti-lynching legislation, and advocated for civil rights. He was a Republican.

== Early life and education ==
Edward Everett Brown was born on 1858 in Dover, New Hampshire, to parents Martha A. (née Runnels) and Charles J. Brown. Two of his sisters were singers, Nellie Brown Mitchell and Edna E. Brown. He graduated from Dover High School in 1878.

Brown studied at Dartmouth College, where he studied French and Latin and was an orator. He gave a speech on genius that received plaudits. He then studied law under New Hampshire judge John H. White. He continued his studies at Boston University Law School and worked in the law office of ex-governor William Gaston along with ex-mayor of Boston Edwin Upton Curtis.

He married and held social functions at his home. His home was at 16 Fountain Street in the Roxbury neighborhood of Boston.

== Career ==
Brown was admitted to the Massachusetts Bar in 1884. In 1885, Brown and friend George C. Freeman were denied entrance to a roller skating rink in Boston, called Highland Rink; Brown and lawyer James Harris Wolff took the rink owner David H. McKay to the Roxbury Municipal Court for racial discrimination and violating a 1865 state law from the Reconstruction-era. They won the case, and brought additional cases forward against the rink a year later.

In 1886, he became a partner at the law firm Walker, Wolff, and Brown, led by Brown, Edwin Garrison Walker, and James Harris Wolff, and it was Boston's first "colored" law firm.

Brown was a member of the Wendell Phillips Club, and founding president of the Crispus Attucks Club in Boston. He was first vice president of the National League of Boston.

Brown wrote the book, "Sketch of the Life of Mr. Lewis Charlton, and Reminiscences of Slavery" (c. 1870, Daily Press Print) about Lewis Charlton, a formerly enslaved person who became a school founder, and temperance advocate.

He worked as the Boston Deputy Health Commissioner, and at the time of his death the Boston Deputy Collector.

== Death ==
Brown died on January 14, 1919. His burial was at Pine Hill Cemetery in Dover, New Hampshire. A marker honoring Brown and his sister was unveiled in 2023 by the Black Heritage Trail of New Hampshire.
