= James H. Wolff =

American lawyer (1847–1913)

James Harris Wolff
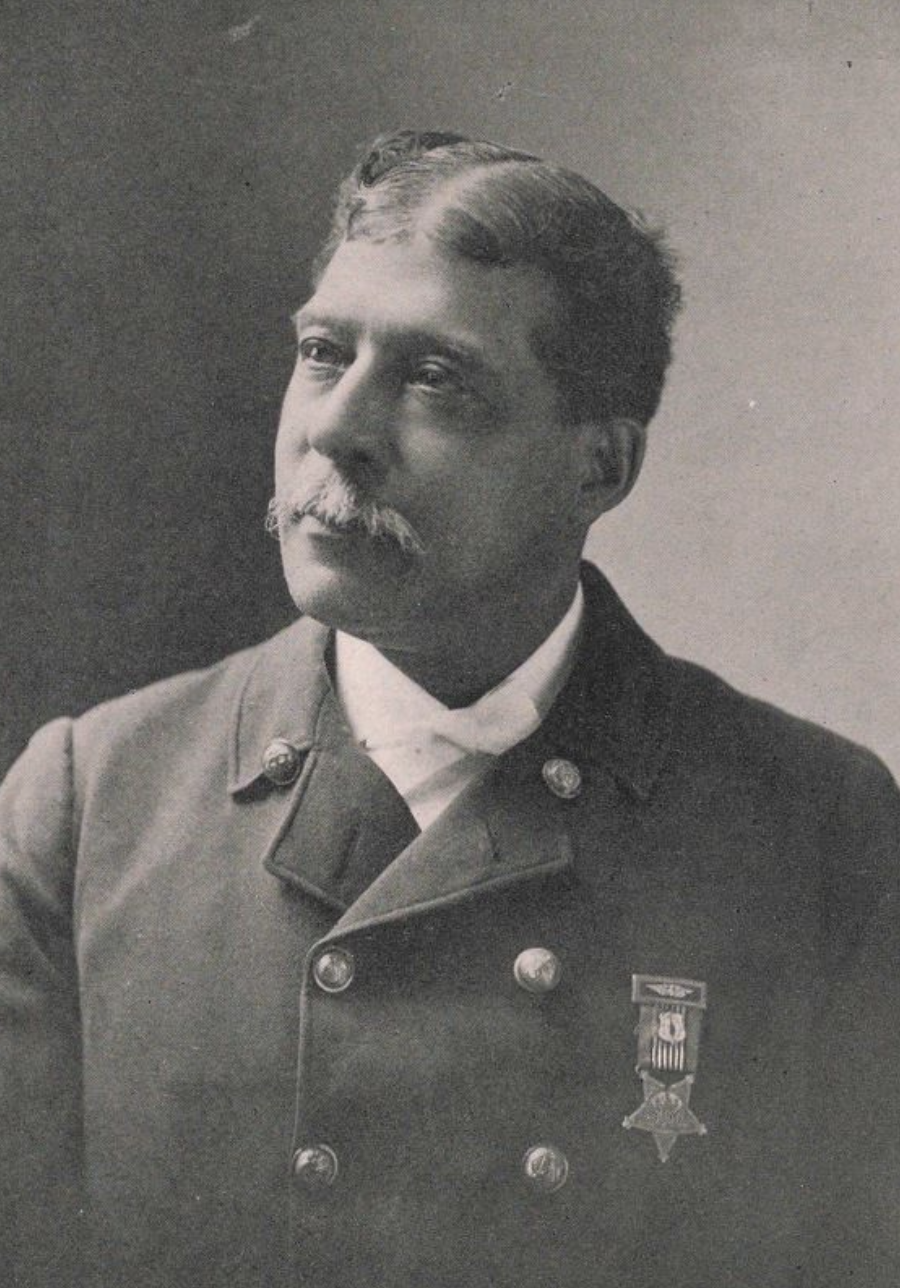
- Wolff, c. 1903
- Born: August 4, 1847; Border Springs, Lowndes County, Mississippi, United States
- Died: May 3, 1913 (aged 65); Boston, Massachusetts, United States
- Burial place: Ridgelawn Cemetery, Watertown, Massachusetts, United States
- Education: New Hampshire College of Agriculture and the Mechanic Arts, Harvard Law School
- Occupations: Lawyer, war veteran, civil rights activist
- Spouse: Mercy Anna Birmingham (m. 1880–1913; his death)

James Harris Wolff (August 4, 1847 – May 3, 1913) was an American Civil War veteran, civil rights activist, and prominent attorney in Boston, Massachusetts. He was a commander of the Grand Army of the Republic (GAR), and he was the only African American to hold that position. Wolff was the first African American admitted to practice law in the federal courts in Maryland.

== Early life, military service, and education ==
James Harris Wolff was born on August 4, 1847, in Border Springs, Lowndes County, Mississippi, to parents Eliza and Abraham Wolff. He was raised on a farm in Holderness, New Hampshire. He attended Kimball Union Academy in Meriden, New Hampshire. From December 4, 1862, until June 17, 1865, during the American Civil War, he served in the United States Navy in the rank of Landsman, and served on the USS Minnesota and the USS Maratanza.

For two years Wolff attended the New Hampshire College of Agriculture and the Mechanic Arts in Hanover, New Hampshire. He moved to Boston to study law under Daniel Wheelwright Gooch. His law studies were continued at Harvard Law School for the next two years, graduating in 1874.

== Career ==
He passed the Suffolk County Bar on June 26, 1875. For the next year he taught in Darien, Georgia; followed by a move to Baltimore, Maryland, where he became the first African American admitted to practice law in the United States Circuit Court (the federal courts in Maryland).

In 1886, Wolff was a founding partner at the Boston law firm Walker, Wolff and Brown at 46 School Street; which was the first Black law firm in the city. The other founding partners included Edwin Garrison Walker, and Edward Everett Brown.

Wolff served as president of the Wendell Phillips Club, and was a founding member of the Crispus Attucks Club in Boston. He was a Republican.

In 1899, Wolff became a commander of the Grand Army of the Republic (GAR) a fraternal organization of Civil War veterans, at Francis Washburn Post 92 in Brighton neighborhood of Boston.

== Death ==
Wolff died of hypertrophy of the prostate on May 3, 1913, in Massachusetts General Hospital in Boston, and was buried at Ridgelawn Cemetery in Watertown.
