= George Frost =

George Frost may refer to:

- George Frost (New Hampshire politician) (1720–1796), American seaman, jurist, and statesman
- George Frost (cricketer) (1848–1913), English cricketer
- George Frost (landscape painter) (1754–1821), English landscape painter
- George Frost (Australian politician) (1869–1942), Australian politician
- George Albert Frost (1843–1907), American artist
- George L. Frost (1830–1879), Wisconsin state legislator
- George Frost (priest) (1935-2026), Anglican priest

== See also ==
- George Frost Kennan, U.S. diplomat
