= Lewis Charlton =

Lewis Charlton may refer to:

- Lewis de Charleton, medieval Bishop of Hereford
- Lewis Charlton (slave), American slave
