= BTNH (disambiguation) =

BTNH may refer to:

- Bone Thugs-n-Harmony, an American hip-hop group
- BTNH Worldwide, an American independent record label
- BTNHResurrection, a 2000 studio album by Bone Thugs-n-Harmony

== See also ==
- Black Heritage Trail of New Hampshire, a nonprofit organization in the U.S. state of New Hampshire
