= Elouise Westbrook =

Social activist and housing rights advocate

Elouise Morris Westbrook
- Born: April 20, 1915
- Died: September 13, 2011 (96 years old)
- Occupation: Activist

Elouise Westbrook (1915–2011) was an American housing rights and health activist in San Francisco. She was one of five activists that made up the Big Five of Bayview, a group of African American women who organized to protect affordable housing, defend civil rights, and bring public services to the Bayview-Hunters Point neighborhood. Elouise is also the Great-Grandmother of NBA player Drew Gooden. Her legacy is honored through multiple public facilities in San Francisco, including the Westbrook Plaza Health Center.

== Life and career ==
Elouise Morris was born in 1915 in Gatesville, Texas, raised in the Waco neighborhood. In 1949, she moved to San Francisco, settling in Bayview-Hunters Point, an area experiencing demographic changes after the arrival of African American wartime shipbuilders. By the mid-1950s, Westbrook joined the staff of the Hunters Point poverty board. Following the adoption of San Francisco’s 1959 redevelopment plans, urban renewal projects began tearing down neighborhoods and displacing thousands of low-income Black residents without providing replacement housing. In response, Westbrook partnered with four other local Black women — Julia Commer, Bertha Freeman, Osceola Washington, and Ruth Williams — to form a powerful movement known as “The Big Five of Bayview.”. Together, they became the political force representing the neighborhood’s needs to local and federal governments. Westbrook became the second woman to serve as the head of Hunters Point-Bayview Joint Housing Committee, positioning her as the primary negotiator for the community’s housing demands.

== Death and legacy ==
Westbrook remained active in community affairs, serving on the boards of multiple community organizations, including the Crispus Attucks Club and the Bayview Neighborhood Community Center. In her later years, she was honored for her lifetime of service. During a dedication ceremony, she was escorted by long-time colleague Senator Dianne Feinstein, where Westbrook remarked on the high honor of the occasion “for a little Black woman from Gatesville, Texas.” Westbrook passed away in her San Francisco home on September 13, 2011, at the age of 96. Her funeral was attended by many state political figures. She was eulogized by San Francisco Mayor Ed Lee and former Mayor Willie Brown.

She was buried next to her husband at the Golden Gate National Cemetery in San Bruno, California. Her work is memorialized at the Westbrook Plaza Health Center, a mixed-use affordable housing and medical facility in San Francisco named in her honor.

== Personal life ==
She was married to Isaac Westbrook, a private in the United States Army during World War II. The couple remained married until his death in 1965. Elouise also has a big family across the U.S. with some still in Gatesville, Texas where she was born.
