= African Americans in the United States Congress =

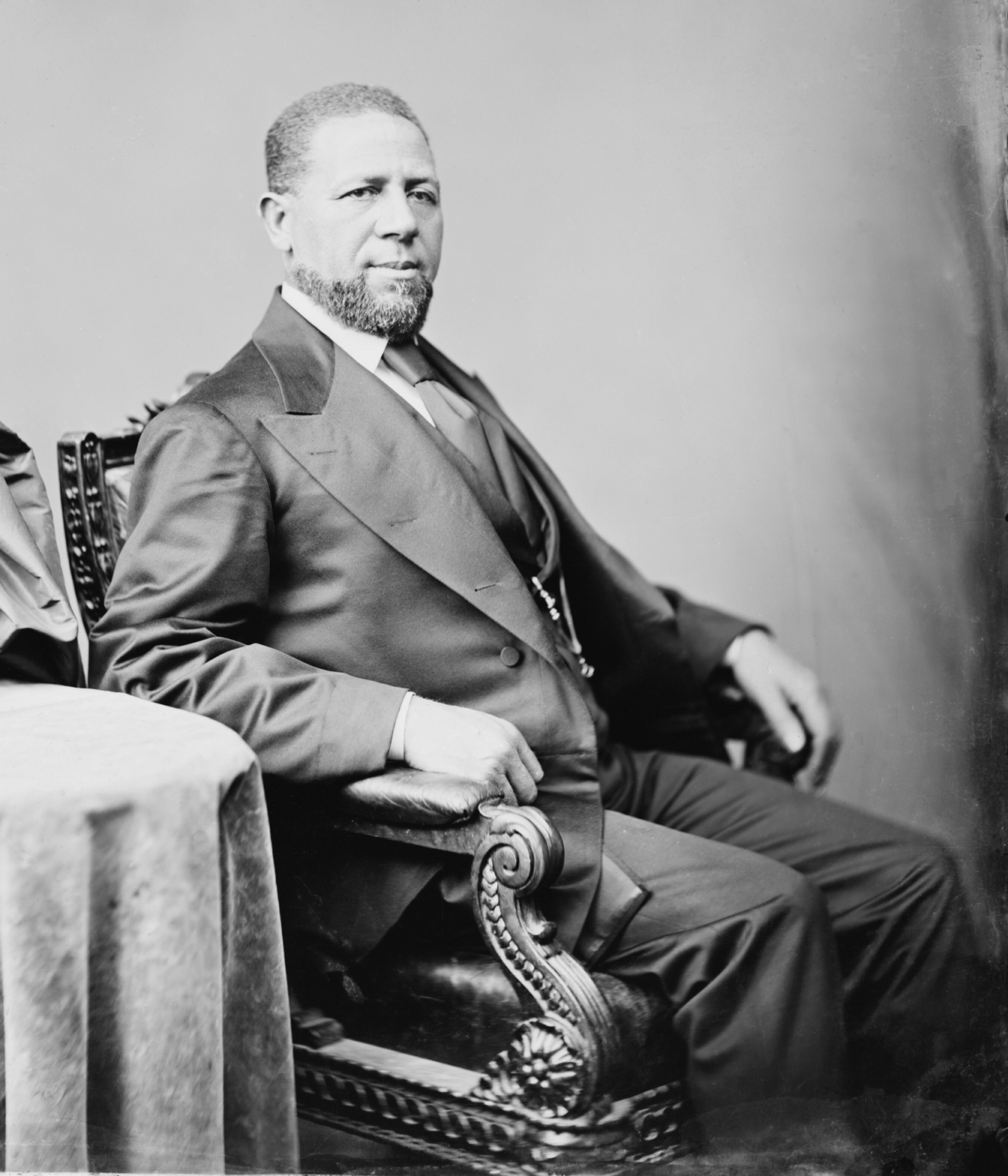
Senator Hiram Revels was the first African American to serve in Congress.

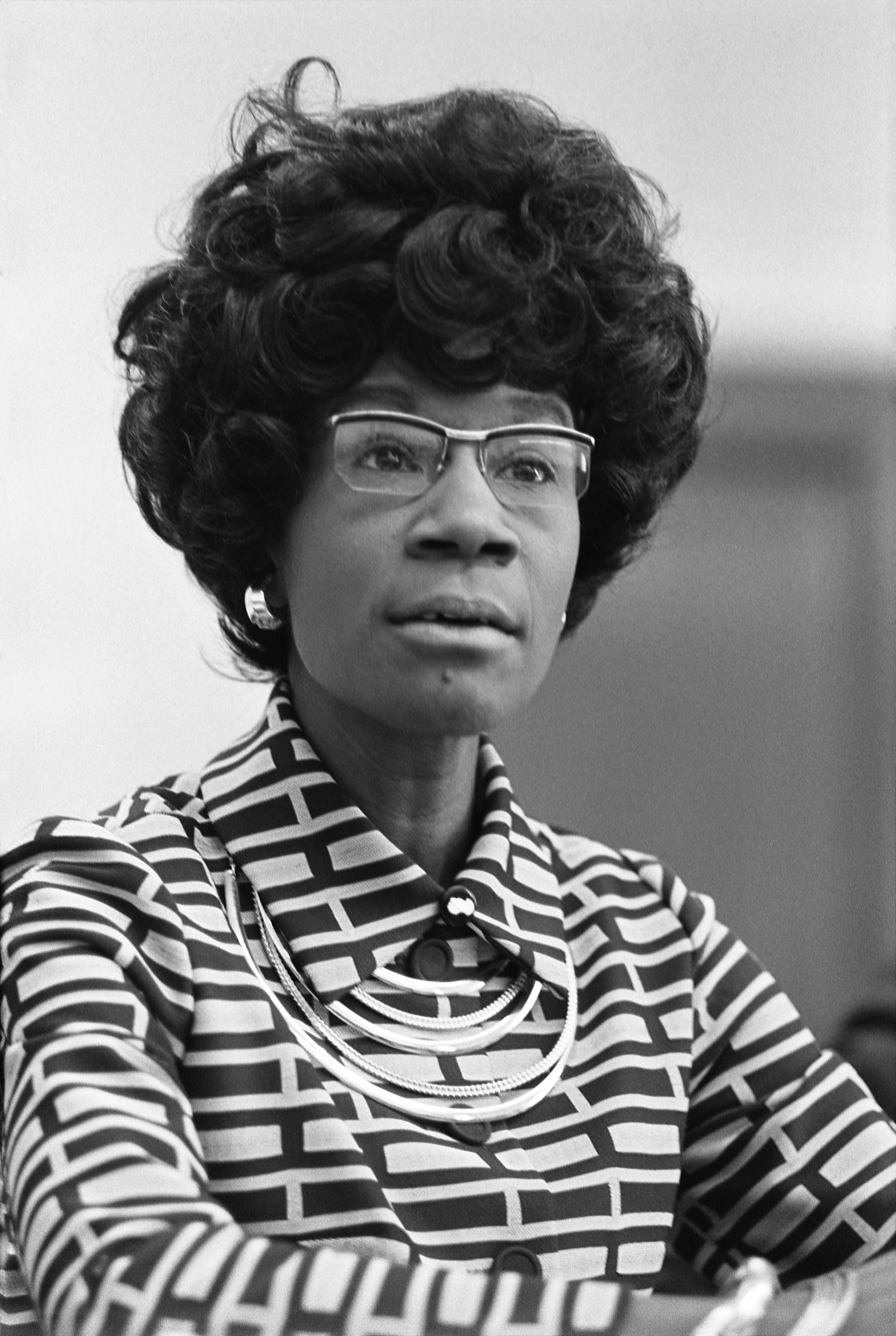
Representative Shirley Chisholm was the first African-American woman to serve in Congress.

From the first United States Congress in 1789 through the 119th Congress in 2025, 198 African Americans served in Congress. Meanwhile, the total number of individuals who served in Congress over that period was 12,585. Between 1789 and 2025, 186 African Americans served in the House of Representatives and 14 in the Senate, with two individuals having served in both chambers. Of these, 193 were voting members, while five served as delegates. Party membership has been 135 Democrats and 31 Republicans. While 13 members founded the Congressional Black Caucus in 1971 during the 92nd Congress, in 2025 it had 62 members, all of them Democrats, out of 535 total seats, plus six delegates.

By the time of the first edition of the House-sponsored book, Black Americans in Congress, in the bicentennial year of 1976, 45 African Americans had served in Congress throughout history. This number rose to 66 by the second edition in 1990, with further increases recorded in the 2008 and 2018 editions in both the 2008 and 2018 editions. The first African American to serve was Senator Hiram Revels in 1870. The first African American to chair a congressional committee was Representative William L. Dawson in 1949. The first African American woman was Representative Shirley Chisholm in 1968, and the first African American to become Dean of the House was John Conyers in 2015. The first African American to become party leader in either chamber of Congress was Hakeem Jeffries in 2023. One member, then Senator Barack Obama, went from the Senate to President of the United States in 2009.

The first African Americans to serve in the United States Congress were Republicans elected during the Reconstruction Era. After the 13th and 14th Amendments to the United States Constitution granted freedom and citizenship to enslaved people, freedmen gained political representation in the Southern United States for the first time. In response to the growing numbers of black statesmen and politicians, white Democrats resorted to violence and intimidation to regain their political power.

By the presidential election of 1876, all but three state legislatures were controlled by whites. The Compromise of 1877 marked the completion of the period of Redemption by white Southerners, with the withdrawal of federal troops from the South. State legislatures began to pass Jim Crow laws to establish racial segregation and restrict labor rights, movement, and organizing among black people. They passed some laws to restrict voter registration, aimed at suppressing the black vote. From 1890 to 1908, state legislatures in the South essentially disfranchised most black people and many poor white people by passing new constitutions, amendments and laws imposing more restrictive electoral and voter registration and electoral rules. As a result of the Civil Rights Movement, the U.S. Congress passed laws in the mid-1960s to end segregation and enforce constitutional civil rights and voting rights.

As Republicans accommodated the end of Reconstruction by becoming more ambiguous on civil rights, and with the rise of the Republican lily-white movement, African Americans began shifting away from the Republican Party.During two major waves of migration within the United States in the first half of the 20th century, more than six million African Americans moved from the South to Northeastern, Midwestern and Western industrial cities. Of these, five million migrated between 1940 and 1970. Some were elected to federal political office from these new locations, and most were elected as Democrats. During the Great Depression, many black voters switched allegiances from the Republican Party to the Democratic Party in support of the New Deal economic, social network and work policies of Franklin D. Roosevelt's administration. This trend continued through the 1960s civil-rights legislation, when voting rights returned to the South, to present.

== History of black representation ==
=== Reconstruction and Redemption ===
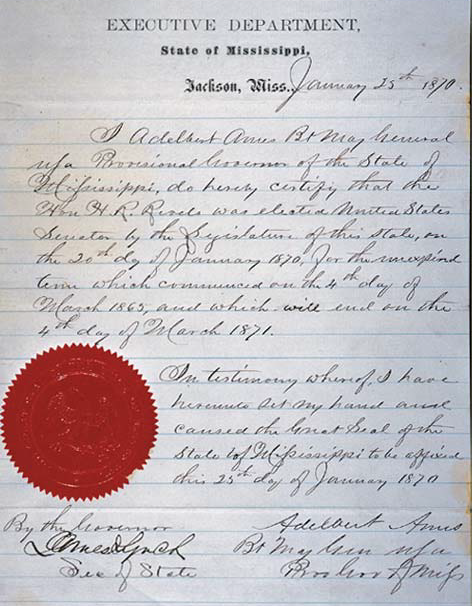
January 25, 1870, letter from the governor and Secretary of State of Mississippi that certified the election of Hiram Rhodes Revels to the Senate

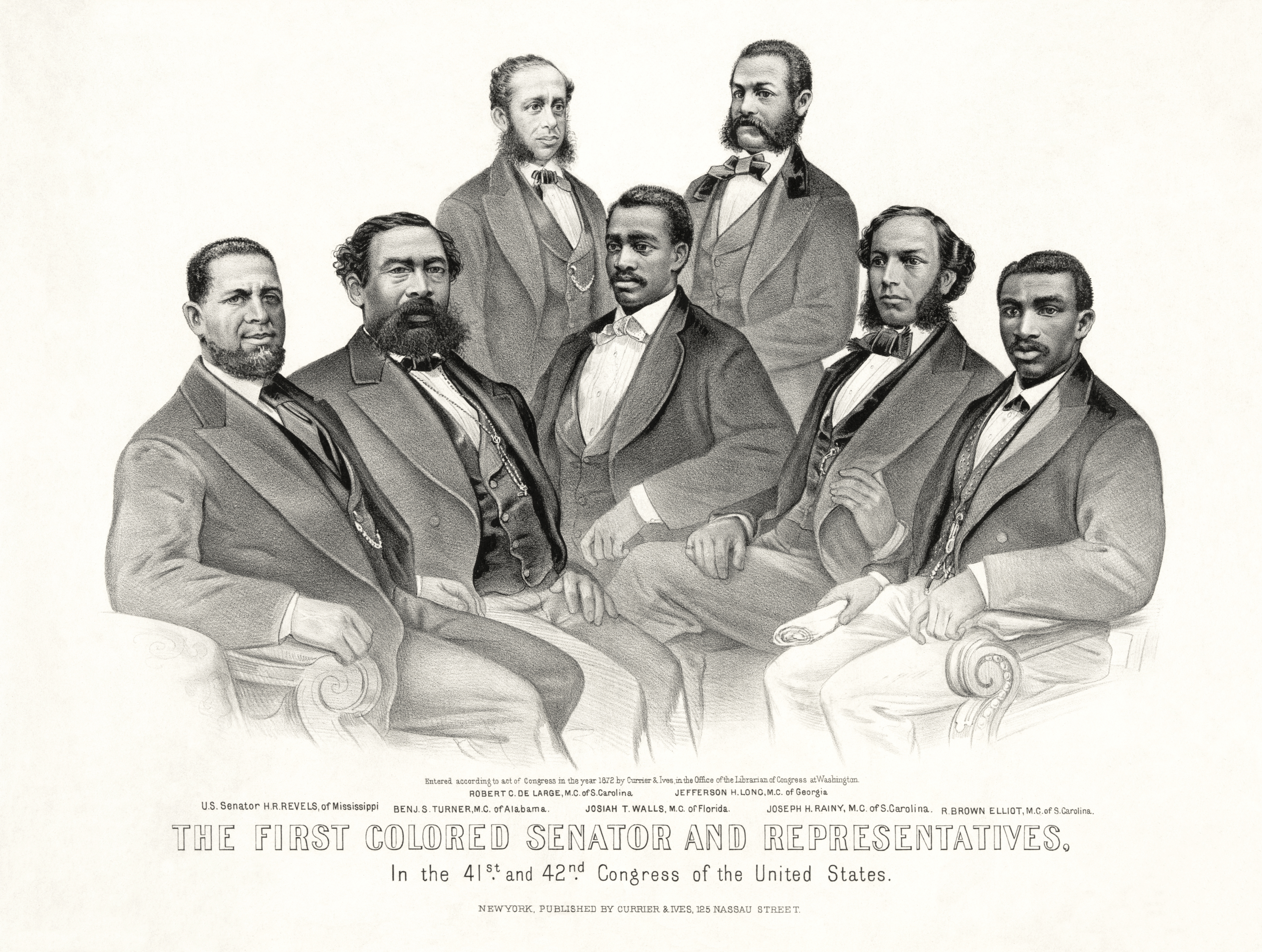
First black senator and representatives: Sen. Hiram Revels (R-MS), Rep. Benjamin S. Turner (R-AL), Robert DeLarge (R-SC), Josiah Walls (R-FL), Jefferson Long (R-GA), Joseph Rainey and Robert B. Elliott (R-SC)

The right of black people to vote and to serve in the United States Congress was established after the Civil War by amendments to the Constitution. The Thirteenth Amendment (ratified December 6, 1865), abolished slavery. The Fourteenth Amendment (ratified July 9, 1868) made all people born or naturalized in the United States citizens. The Fifteenth Amendment (ratified February 3, 1870) forbade the denial or abridgment of the right to vote on account of race, color or previous condition of servitude, and gave Congress the power to enforce the law by appropriate legislation.

The first black person to address Congress was Henry Highland Garnet, in 1865, on occasion of the passage of the Thirteenth Amendment.

In 1866, Congress passed the Civil Rights Act and the four Reconstruction Acts, which dissolved all governments in the former Confederate states with the exception of Tennessee. It divided the South into five military districts, where the military, through the Freedmen's Bureau, helped to protect the rights and safety of newly freed black people. The act required that the former Confederate states ratify their constitutions conferring citizenship rights on black people or forfeit their representation in Congress.

As a result of these measures, black people acquired the right to vote across the Southern states. In several states (notably Mississippi and South Carolina), black people were the majority of the population. By forming coalitions with pro-Union white people, Republicans took control of the state legislatures. At the time, state legislatures elected the members of the U.S. Senate. During Reconstruction, only the state legislature of Mississippi elected any black senators. On February 25, 1870, Hiram Rhodes Revels was seated as the first black member of the Senate, while Blanche Bruce, also of Mississippi, seated in 1875, was the second. Revels was the first black member of the Congress overall.

Black people were a majority of the population in many congressional districts across the South. In 1870, Joseph Rainey of South Carolina was elected to the U.S. House of Representatives, becoming the first directly elected black member of Congress to be seated. Black people were elected to national office also from Alabama, Florida, Georgia, Louisiana, Mississippi, North Carolina, Texas and Virginia.

All of these Reconstruction-era black senators and representatives were members of the Republican Party. The Republicans represented the party of Abraham Lincoln and emancipation, while the Democrats represented the party of planters, slavery and secession.

From 1868, Southern elections were accompanied by increasing violence, especially in Louisiana, Mississippi and the Carolinas, in an effort by Democrats to suppress black voting and regain power. In the mid-1870s, paramilitary groups such as the White League and Red Shirts worked openly to turn Republicans out of office and intimidate black people from voting. This followed the earlier years of secret vigilante action by the Ku Klux Klan against freedmen and allied white people.

After the disputed Presidential election of 1876 between Democratic Samuel J. Tilden, governor of New York, and Republican Rutherford B. Hayes, governor of Ohio, a national agreement between Democratic and Republican factions was negotiated, resulting in the Compromise of 1877. Under the compromise, Democrats conceded the election to Hayes and promised to acknowledge the political rights of black people; Republicans agreed to withdraw federal troops from the South and promised to appropriate a portion of federal monies toward Southern projects.

=== Disenfranchisement ===
With the Southern states "redeemed", Democrats gradually regained control of Southern legislatures. They proceeded to restrict the rights of the majority of black people and many poor white people to vote by imposing new requirements for poll taxes, subjective literacy tests, more strict residency requirements and other elements difficult for laborers to satisfy.

By the 1880s, legislators increased restrictions on black voters through voter registration and election rules. In 1888, John Mercer Langston, president of Virginia State University at Petersburg, was elected to the U.S. Congress as the first African American from Virginia. He would also be the last for nearly a century, as the state passed a disenfranchising constitution at the turn of the century that, in effect, excluded black people from politics for decades.

Starting with the Florida Constitution of 1885, white Democrats passed new constitutions in ten Southern states with provisions that restricted voter registration and forced hundreds of thousands of people from registration rolls. These changes effectively prevented most black people and many poor white people from voting. However, many illiterate white people were exempted from requirements as literacy tests by such strategies as the grandfather clause, basing eligibility on an ancestor's voting status as of 1866, for instance.

Southern state and local legislatures also passed Jim Crow laws that segregated transportation, public facilities and daily life based on race. Finally, racial violence in the form of lynchings and race riots increased in frequency, reaching a peak in the last decade of the 19th century.

The last black congressman elected from the South in the 19th century was George Henry White of North Carolina, elected in 1896 and re-elected in 1898. His term expired in 1901, the same year that William McKinley, who was the last president to have fought in the Civil War, died. No black people served in Congress for the next 28 years, and none represented any Southern state for the next 72 years.

== The modern era ==
Map of congressional districts represented by African Americans in the 117th Congress (2021–2023)

From 1910 to 1940, the Great Migration of black people from the rural South to Northern cities such as New York City, Philadelphia, Chicago, Detroit and Cleveland began to produce black-majority Congressional districts in the North. In the North, black people could exercise their right to vote. In the two waves of the Great Migration through 1970, more than six and a half million black people moved north and west and became highly urbanized.

In 1928, Oscar De Priest won the 1st Congressional District of Illinois (the South Side of Chicago) as a Republican, becoming the first black congressman of the modern era. Arthur Wergs Mitchell became the first African-American Democrat elected to Congress, part of the New Deal Coalition, when he replaced De Priest in 1935 after having defeated him in the prior year's general election. De Priest, Mitchell and their eventual successor, William Dawson, were the only African Americans in Congress up to the mid-1940s, when additional black Democrats began to be elected in Northern cities. In 1949, Dawson became the first African American in history to chair a congressional committee. De Priest was the last African-American Republican elected to the House for 58 years, until Gary Franks was elected to represent Connecticut's 5th in 1990. Franks was joined by J.C. Watts in 1994 but lost his bid for reelection two years later. After Watts retired in 2003, the House had no black Republicans until 2011, with the 2010 elections of Allen West in Florida's 22nd and Tim Scott in South Carolina's 1st. West lost his reelection bid in 2012, while Scott resigned in January 2013 to accept appointment to the U.S. Senate. Two new black Republicans, Will Hurd of Texas's 23rd district and Mia Love of Utah's 4th district, were elected in 2014, with Love being the first ever black Republican woman to be elected to Congress. She lost reelection in 2018, leaving Hurd as the only black Republican member of the U.S. House. Hurd forwent reelection in 2020, but two black Republicans were elected to the House that year: Byron Donalds in Florida and Burgess Owens in Utah. In 2022, African-American Republicans Wesley Hunt and John James were elected to the House from Texas and Michigan, respectively, and there currently are four black Republicans in the U.S. House of Representatives. However, all four of these representatives retired ahead of the 2026 United States House of Representatives elections, meaning that the 120th United States Congress will have no Black Republicans in the House of Representatives.

The election of President Franklin D. Roosevelt in 1932 led to a shift of black voting loyalties from Republican to Democrat, as Roosevelt's New Deal programs offered economic relief to people suffering from the Great Depression. From 1940 to 1970, nearly five million black Americans moved north and also west, especially to California, in the second wave of the Great Migration. By the mid-1960s, an overwhelming majority of black voters were Democrats, and most were voting in states outside the former Confederacy.

It was not until after passage by Congress of the Voting Rights Act of 1965, the result of years of effort on the part of African Americans and allies in the Civil Rights Movement, that black people within the Southern states recovered their ability to exercise their rights to vote and to live with full civil rights. While legal segregation ended, accomplishing voter registration and redistricting to implement the sense of the law took more time.

On January 3, 1969, Shirley Chisholm was sworn as the nation's first African-American congresswoman. Two years later, she became one of the 13 founding members of the Congressional Black Caucus.

Until 1992, most black House members were elected from inner-city districts in the North and West: New York City, Newark, New Jersey, Philadelphia, Baltimore, Chicago, Cleveland, Detroit, St. Louis and Los Angeles all elected at least one black member. Following the 1990 census, Congressional districts needed to be redrawn due to the population shifts of the country. Various federal court decisions resulted in states redistricting to provide some districts where the majority of the population was composed of African Americans, rather than gerrymandering to exclude black majorities.

Both parties have used gerrymandering to gain political advantage by drawing districts to favor their own party. Some districts were created to link widely separated black communities. As a result, several black Democratic members of the House were elected from new districts in Alabama, Florida, rural Georgia, rural Louisiana, North Carolina, South Carolina and Virginia for the first time since Reconstruction. Additional black-majority districts were also created in this way in California, Maryland and Texas, thus increasing the number of black-majority districts.

The creation of black-majority districts was a process supported by both parties. The Democrats saw it as a means of providing social justice, as well as connecting easily to black voters who had been voting Democratic for decades. The Republicans believed they gained by the change, as many of the Democratic voters were moved out of historically Republican-majority districts. By 2000, other demographic and cultural changes resulted in the Republican Party holding a majority of white-majority House districts.

Since the 1940s, when decades of the Great Migration resulted in millions of African Americans having migrated from the South, no state has had a majority of African-American residents. Twelve African Americans have served in the Senate since the 1940s: Edward W. Brooke, a Republican from Massachusetts; Carol Moseley Braun, Barack Obama and Roland Burris (appointed to fill a vacancy), all Democrats from Illinois; Tim Scott (initially appointed to fill a vacancy, but later elected), a Republican from South Carolina; Mo Cowan (appointed to fill a vacancy), a Democrat from Massachusetts; Cory Booker, a Democrat from New Jersey; Kamala Harris, and Laphonza Butler (appointed to fill a vacancy), Democrats from California; Raphael Warnock, a Democrat from Georgia; Angela Alsobrooks, a Democrat from Maryland; and Lisa Blunt Rochester, a Democrat from Delaware. In the 120th United States Congress, Juliana Stratton, another Democrat from Illinois, and Scott Colom, a Democrat from Mississippi, will join them.

== List of African Americans in the United States Congress ==
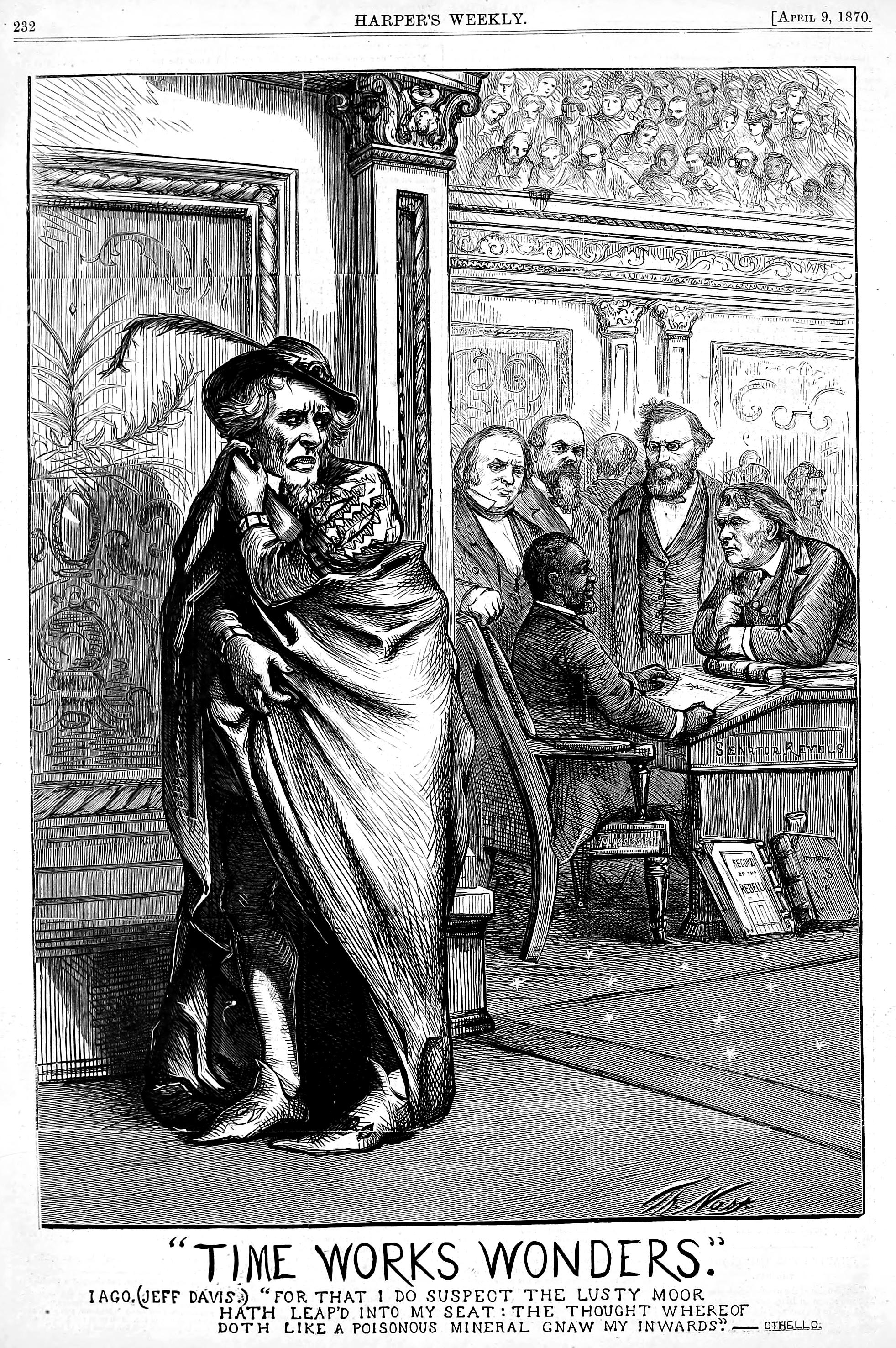
Political cartoon: Revels (seated) replaces Jefferson Davis (left; dressed as Iago from Shakespeare's Othello) in the Senate. Harper's Weekly Feb. 19, 1870. Davis had been a senator from Mississippi until 1861.

== See also ==
- African-American officeholders in the United States, 1789–1866
- Black suffrage in the United States
  - African-American women's suffrage movement
- Civil rights movement (1865–1896)
- Congressional Black Caucus
- List of African-American United States Cabinet members
- List of African-American U.S. state firsts
- List of first African-American mayors
- Negro Republican Party
- Politics of the United States
