= Rock Rest =

Historic house in Maine, United States

- U.S. National Register of Historic Places
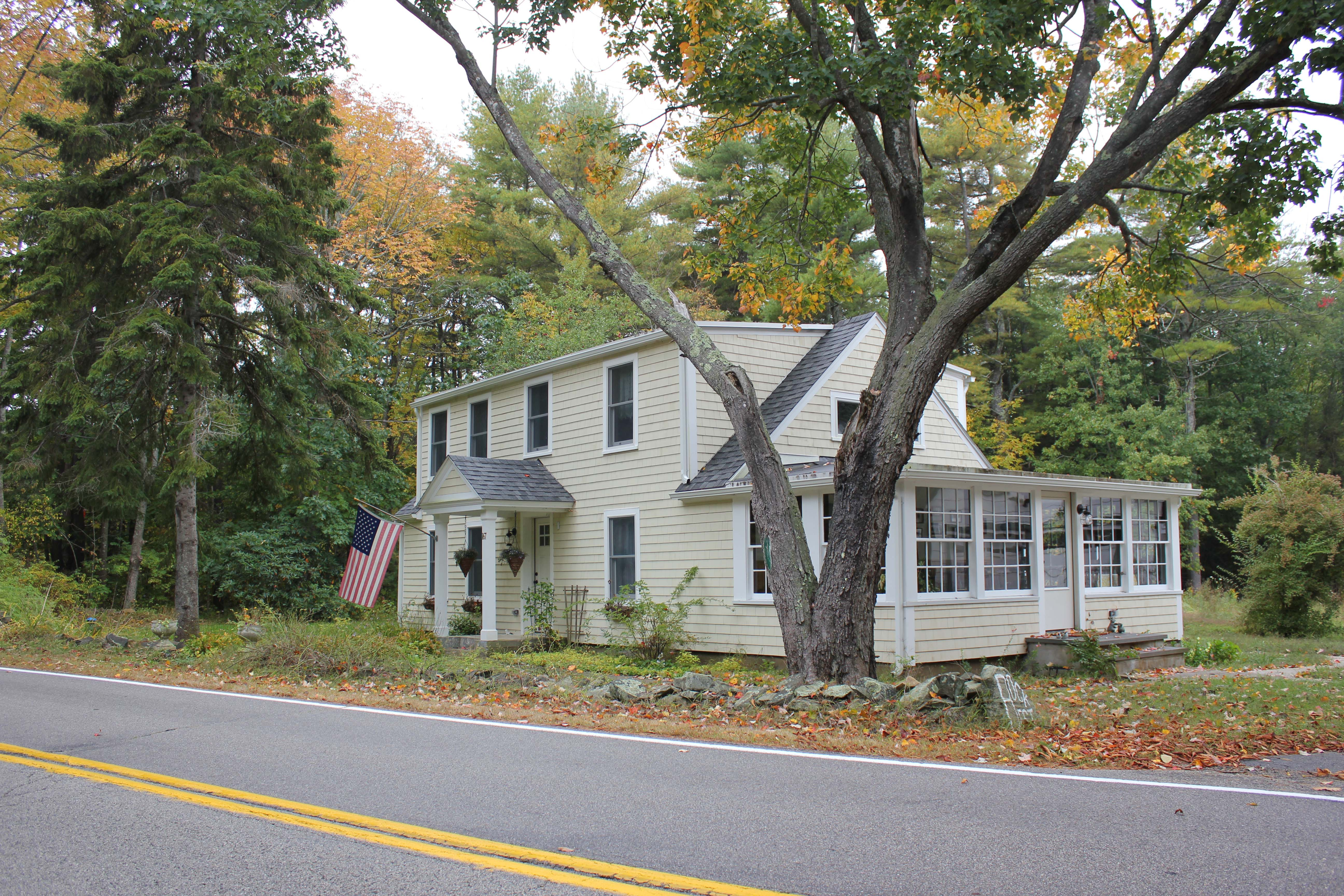
- The main house in 2014

- Location within Maine Location within the United States
- Location: 167 Brave Boat Harbor Rd., Kittery, Maine, U.S.
- Coordinates: 43°6′20″N 70°40′34″W
- Area: 1.8 acres (0.73 ha)
- Built: Main house: 18th century or early 19th century; renovated 1938–1940; Guest house: c. 1948
- Architectural style: Late 19th and early 20th century American movements
- NRHP reference No.: 07001449
- Added to NRHP: January 24, 2008

Rock Rest is a historic house and African-American traveler's accommodation at 167 Brave Boat Harbor Road in Kittery, Maine. The property was operated as a summer guest house by Clayton and Hazel Sinclair between 1946 and 1977, and is one of the few known places in Maine that explicitly welcomed African-American guests in an era when racial discrimination in public accommodations was common. The property was listed on the National Register of Historic Places in 2008.

== Description ==
Rock Rest is located on the northwest side of Brave Boat Harbor Road (on this section designated Maine State Route 103), just east of its junction with Galley Farm Lane. The main house, set close to the road, is a 1 1/2-story wood frame Cape style house, with full shed-roof dormers to the front and rear providing a substantial second floor. A large glassed-in porch extends to the right, and a gabled porch shelters the front entry. To the right (north) of the house is a driveway, with a guest house/garage set back from the street. From the street it appears as a two-bay garage with a half story above; from this a larger and wider structure extends to the rear. This rear space housed a common area on the ground floor and guest rooms on the second floor.

== History ==
The property was purchased in 1938 by Clayton and Hazel Sinclair; both were originally from New York City, and had served on the staffs hired by white summer visitors to Maine before they met. In New York City, Hazel Sinclair had worked as a ladies maid to a family that summered in Maine. Clayton Sinclair, who worked at the Portsmouth Naval Shipyard, enlarged what was originally a modest Cape. The Sinclairs began taking in guest lodgers at some point before the end of World War II.

The Sinclairs continued to operate the business after Maine passed a civil rights law governing public accommodations in 1971, and only closed in 1977 due to poor health.

== Reputation ==
Drawn in part by Hazel's reputation as a cook, word of mouth brought them additional business, and they formally opened Rock Rest as a summer guest house in 1946. The property accommodated 16 guests at its height, and housed as many as 50 at parties during the summer season in the 1950s.

The predominantly Black clientele was drawn mostly from the northeastern United States. The Sinclairs advertised through postcards they sent to a mailing list they maintained. The business was successful even though it did not advertise in publications catering to the African-American traveling public, such as The Negro Motorist Green Book.

== Legacy ==
Rock Rest is included in the 2020 documentary Driving While Black, which was broadcast on PBS. The film was based on the book Driving While Black: African American Travel and the Road to Civil Rights by Gretchen Sorin. In the film, Valerie Cunningham, whose aunt ran Rock Rest, spoke about how the guest house advertised "fine home cooked food and a garden with fresh vegetables, plenty of shade trees with a relaxing atmosphere."

In June 2022, the Black Heritage Trail of New Hampshire unveiled two historical markers, one in Kittery and one in Kittery Point, highlighting the site's historical significance.

The National Museum of African American History & Culture has objects and memorabilia from Rock Rest in its collection. One object is a boulder with the words "Rock Rest" painted in white.

== See also ==
- National Register of Historic Places listings in York County, Maine
- Cummings' Guest House
- Black Travel Movement
