= Big Five of Bayview =

Community leaders in San Francisco in the 1960s–70s

The Big Five of Bayview were community leaders and political activists from the Bayview and Hunters Point districts in San Francisco who were instrumental in backing the India Basin and Hunters Point Redevelopment Projects to completion in the 1960s and 1970s.

== Activism ==
The five African-American women were all outspoken mothers and members of the Crispus Attucks Club who worked to improve their neighborhood. Arthur Hippler characterized the day-to-day social organization of Hunters Point as "matrifocal".

The Big Five first became active in the early 1960s, confronting poverty and discrimination in Hunters Point, filling the void left by weak religious leaders. Pat Womack identified them as "strong Black women who took a stand" They won fame by marching in 1973 in Washington DC for funds that had been promised to complete the housing to replace temporary housing in Hunters Point, not leaving until they had secured a $30 million grant. Streets and landmarks in the neighborhood have since been named in their honor.

== Biographical sketches and legacy ==
The Big Five are identified in a 1996 oral history as Julia Commer, Bertha Freeman, Osceola Washington, Elouise Westbrook, and Rosalie Williams. One source from 2007 identifies Ruth Williams as one of the Big Five instead of Bertha Freeman. A second source from 2011 states the Big Five includes Beatrice Dunbar instead of Rosalie Williams. A third source from 1972 states Ardith Nichols was one of the Big Five instead of Rosalie Williams. The three undisputed members are Julia Commer, Osceola Washington, and Elouise Westbrook.

=== Julia Commer ===
Julia Adell Commer (1920–1997) was credited as "one of the community leaders who had fought to turn the 134-acre slum ... into a new environment of garden homes and sparkling schools" in a 1978 San Francisco Chronicle article describing the demolition of the temporary housing built to house World War II shipyard workers at the San Francisco Naval Shipyard.

=== Osceola Washington ===
Osceola Pierson Washington Means (c. 1915–2002) was a local community leader in housing, and a pioneer in the poverty and model cities program at Hunters Point.

=== Elouise Westbrook ===
Elouise (sometimes written as Eloise) Westbrook was born in Gatesville, Texas in 1915 and moved to San Francisco in 1949. She died in her home on September 13, 2011. At her funeral on September 21, 2011, she was eulogized by Mayor Ed Lee and former mayor Willie Brown, who said "she used to scare me" by demanding he answer her calls and showing up at his office unannounced.

=== Alternate membership ===
As noted above, the following five names have been advanced as part of the Big Five on some lists.

==== Bertha Freeman ====
Bertha Freeman was featured on the news for leading a community sub-committee that selected teaching assistants for the Bayview-Hunters Point neighborhood.

==== Ruth Williams ====
Ruth Williams (née Ruth Barbara Williamson; September 1, 1935 - January 27, 1995) was an African American producer, playwright, actress, educator and activist in San Francisco California from the 1960s until the 1990s. She was born in Baton Rouge, Louisiana to Charlotte (Herbert) Williamson, a seamstress, and Dallas Williamson, who worked for the Workforce Progress Administration. In addition to African ancestry, Williams's mother was Creole, speaking fluent French and her father was of European descent. In her hometown, segregation was the rule and her parents, being considered an interracial couple, married in Chicago-since it was illegal at the time for them to be married in the state of Louisiana.

Williams completed her college education in the early 1950s at Southern University majoring in theater and minoring in sociology. Later, she went on to undertake the Masters program at Lone Mountain Women's College, in San Francisco. Her goal was to become a journalist, however opportunities for women in this field were very limited at the time. Upon graduating Southern University, she met and married George Breaux, from which union two daughters. Later in April 1953 Ruth was remarried to George Williams Sr. in Iberville, Louisiana and from this union, six sons. When their sons were still young, in 1958 the couple moved with the boys to Vallejo, California with Ruth's sister. During this time, her husband George Williams, who was a World War II veteran (Tech Sergeant), worked at the Mare Island shipyard as a laborer, and the family moved to Floyd Terrace Apartments which was naval housing. Ruth was a stay-at-home mother of her six sons.

In 1960 the Williams family moved to San Francisco, California and lived in tenement housing on Howard Street (between 9th and 10th St). After nearly 3 years, the family moved to a rental house in the residential neighborhood of Bayview on Newcomb and Newhall. Around this time, Ruth Williams became employed as an administrative health professional at the Community Health Service for Dr. Arthur H. Coleman. Dr. Coleman was a general practitioner who served the predominantly black community of Bayview, often making house calls and forgiving the medical bills of less fortunate families. Dr. Coleman was the first black physician and one of the last privately practicing family doctors in San Francisco's Bayview-Hunters Point district. He was a prominent community leader of his time. Working with Dr. Coleman, Ruth became engrossed in addressing healthcare disparities in her neighborhood. She spearheaded a program for women and children, focusing primarily on single parent mothers and connecting them to healthcare professionals for sex-education and women's health, eventually establishing a Family Planning Clinic which she ran for 25 years.

She became active in the Bayview Hunters Point District, aligning herself with the community's "Big Five": Elouise Westbrook, Oceola Washington, Julie Commer, Bertha Freeman, and Rosie Lee Williams. The Big Five of Bayview were a group of women who were widely respected community leaders demanding more resources for the Bayview Hunters Point community and District 10. Ruth Williams was known for her unique ability of preventing the exploitation of the community by dispassionate corporate interests. In 1962 Ruth Williams served on the San Francisco Human Rights Commission's Employment Committee and was chairperson of the San Francisco General Outpatient Council, as well as working in the Planned Parenthood Clinic in sex education, parenting and drug rehabilitation.

Her work in the community escalated over the years, serving on the Joint Housing Committee, Poverty Council, Butchertown Homeowners and Tenants Association, and the Model Cities Commission. In 1967, Robert Kennedy visited Bayview Hunters Point and spoke with Ruth Williams about the issues of poverty facing the community.

Ruth Williams's testimony before the United States Senate Appropriations Committee in 1970 led to the release of 30 million dollars of Housing and Urban Development funds to Bayview Hunters Point residents. The Jackie Robinson Gardens Apartments in Hunters Point, a low-income affordable housing complex, and the first of its kind in Hunters Point, was co-founded by Ruth Williams. The subsidized housing was composed of over 2,000 units of single-family housing and had a childcare center, named for Sojourner Truth in the apartment complex. Ruth Williams and her husband George Williams, who was the executive director of the Bayview Hunters Point Housing Development Corporation, were also responsible for the first 14 single family residences on La Salle and Mendel, in Bayview shortly before her husband fell ill.

After George Williams's untimely death in 1973 from hypertension, Ruth Williams mounted a campaign to combat the disproportionate impact of high blood pressure and heart disease on the African American community. She organized a fundraiser at Candlestick Park, and the largest soul and gospel show ever performed in Bayview Hunters Point, soliciting the assistance of such outstanding artists as musical director and composer, H. B. Barnum, Tina Turner, Larry Graham, the O'Jays. and Danny Glover.

Williams produced a telethon for high blood pressure featuring national celebrities such as Angie Dickenson, Charlie Dearcopp, Robert Guilliame, Chaka Khan, and others. Musical Artists Earth, Wind and Fire bandmembers donated $1,000 each. Williams raised $55,000 for the Bayview Hunters Point community. The funds were used to educate the community on the impact of hypertension, then known as the silent killer of many African Americans.

Williams was the creator and producer of the first Miss Black San Francisco pageants in 1977, 1978, and 1979 to recognize the beauty of African American women. Her relationships with young single mothers of the southeastern community of Bayview Hunters Point, illuminated the need for more self-esteem and self-empowerment of young black women. She founded the Miss Black San Francisco Pageant which continued until 1984 when the first black woman, Vanessa Williams (no relation) won Miss America. Helen Vaughn, the mother of actress Terry Vaughn was a contestant in the first pageant. With her background in performing arts, Ruth Williams established the Bayview Repertory Theater Company and produced 37 plays as a writer and actress tab the Bayview Opera House.

===== Honoring her work =====
Originally named the South San Francisco Opera House, the venue became the Bayview Opera House when South San Francisco became its own incorporated city. On December 7, 1995, the San Francisco Board of Supervisors renamed the facility The Bayview Opera House Ruth Williams Memorial Theater.(City and County of San Francisco Resolution No.1027-95) Ruth Williams had played a leading role in promoting the arts and culture of the Bayview-Hunters Point and preventing the demolition of the historic structure in the 1960s after a riot.

On Sept. 27, 1966, tragedy had struck. Mounting racial tensions reached a critical point when an unarmed 16-year-old Black teenager, Matthew "Peanut" Johnson, was shot in the back by a white police officer, Alvin Johnson, as he fled from the scene of a reportedly stolen car. Matthew Johnson died within minutes. Word quickly spread, and the neighborhood was stricken with grief and anger. A crowd gathered at the scene on that unseasonably sweltering day, and by the evening, at least 200 had people began to wander down Third Street, throwing bottles and rocks at police cars and smashing the windows of businesses that were not Black-owned. This eventually became known as the Hunters Point Social Uprising, and the following day, the Bayview Opera House would be at the center of it all.

An estimated 700 protesters gathered at the intersection of Third Street and Newcomb Avenue around 11 a.m., once again throwing miscellaneous objects at the police cars that were also there. Requesting backup, the officers began to push the protesters south along Third Street, eventually reaching the community center housed in the Bayview Opera House.

The building was already in a state of disrepair in 1967 when it was riddled with bullets from the gunfire of the National Guard in reaction to a suspected sniper on the building. In the wake of the shooting, Williams was successful in obtaining the funds to hire African-American architect Harry Overstreet to renovate and restore the landmark building. Actor Danny Glover was also a program manager and evaluation specialist responsible for remodeling the space.

The Bayview Opera House later became the first building in the Bayview to enter the National Register of Historic Places. The venue also hosted dances, tutorial programs and counseling services. The building was designated as City Landmark No. 8 — long before San Francisco City Hall and Ghirardelli Square, largely due to Ruth Williams's efforts to protect the space.

Ruth Williams was a producer, playwright and actress who produced numerous plays and musicals at the Bayview Opera House and was an integral influence on the careers of actor Danny Glover, singer Cindy Herron of En Vogue and local black playwrights and film makers. One of Ruth Williams last efforts was a loan in the amount of $200,000 that was approved by the Bayview Hunter's Point Economic Development Task Force to build a program around the arts for up and coming youth of Bayview Hunters Point, which was met with opposition in the city's bureaucracy and never materialized.

===== Death =====
After several years battling multiple myeloma, a cancer of plasma cells, Williams died at Stanford Hospital, at the age of 63 on January 27, 1995.

== Successors and other areas ==
One writer identified Espanola Jackson as the successor matriarch in Bayview/Hunters Point. Mary Rogers was cited as having filled a similar role for the Fillmore/Western Addition district.
