= Charles Lewis Mitchell =

American politician (1829–1912)

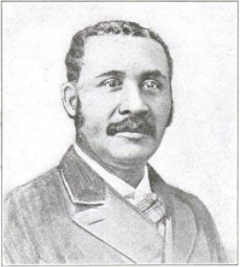
- Undated sketch from Mitchell's obituary in The Crisis (1912)

Member of the Massachusetts House of Representatives from the 6th Suffolk district
- In office 1867–1867

Personal details
- Born: November 10, 1829 Hartford, Connecticut, US
- Died: April 13, 1912 (aged 82)
- Party: Republican
- Spouse: Nellie Brown Mitchell

Charles Lewis Mitchell (November 10, 1829 – April 13, 1912) was a printer, officer in the Union Army during the American Civil War, and state legislator in Massachusetts. Along with Edward G. Walker, Mitchell was one of the first two African Americans to serve in the Massachusetts General Court.

== Early life ==
Mitchell was born in Hartford, Connecticut. In 1853 he began work as a printer for William Lloyd Garrison's abolitionist newspaper, The Liberator. During the American Civil War he served in the 55th Massachusetts Colored Volunteer Infantry and was wounded at the Battle of Honey Hill in South Carolina, resulting in the loss of one foot. For his courage in action at Honey Hill, Mitchell was promoted to second lieutenant.

After the war, Mitchell married Nellie Brown, a noted popular singer in Boston.

== Political career ==
In 1866, Mitchell was elected to the Massachusetts House of Representatives as a Republican, representing the sixth ward of Boston. Taking his seat in January 1867, he and Edward G. Walker became the first African Americans to hold legislative offices in Massachusetts. During his one term in the House, Mitchell served on the House Standing Committee on Printing. In 1869, he was appointed as an inspector in the U.S. customs office in Boston, and subsequently promoted to clerk. Mitchell served in the customs office for forty years until his retirement in 1909.

At William Lloyd Garrison's funeral in Boston, in May 1879, Mitchell was one of eight pallbearers, along with Wendell Phillips and Lewis Hayden. Nellie Brown Mitchell also sang at the funeral, as part of a quartet of African American singers.

In 1897, at the unveiling of Augustus Saint-Gaudens's celebrated memorial to Robert Gould Shaw and the 54th Massachusetts Infantry, Mitchell was formally in attendance along with his former commanding officer in the 55th Massachusetts, Norwood Penrose Hallowell.

== See also ==
- Nellie Brown Mitchell
- 55th Massachusetts Infantry Regiment
- Edward G. Walker
- African-American officeholders in the United States, 1789–1866
