= African-American officeholders in the United States, 1789–1866 =

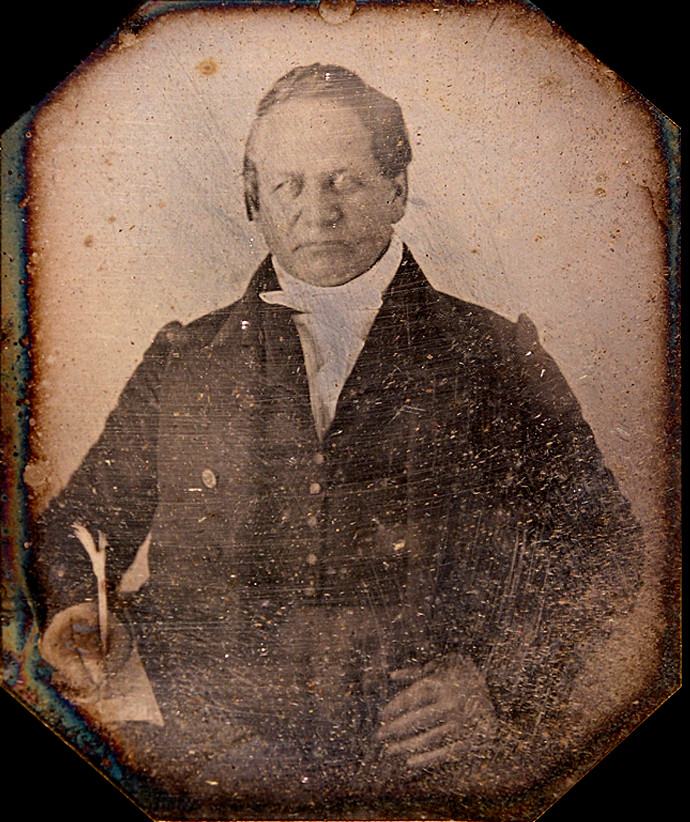
In 1836, Alexander L. Twilight became the first African American to be elected as a state legislator in the United States.

The United States has had five African American elected officeholders prior to 1867. After Congress passed the First Military Reconstruction Act of 1867 and ratified the Fifteenth Amendment to the United States Constitution in 1870, African Americans began to be elected or appointed to national, state, county and local offices throughout the United States.

Four of the five officeholders served in New England states. Three officeholders served as state legislators.

- Wentworth Cheswill first served in an elective office in 1776 as a local school board member in Newmarket, New Hampshire, and later as a justice of the peace (making him the first African American to serve as a judge). Held an elective office until his death in 1817.
- Alexander Lucius Twilight was an American educator, politician, and minister. In the United States, he was the first African American to earn from an American college a degree (Middlebury College in 1823). He was the first African American in the United States elected to serve in a state legislature (elected to the Vermont House of Representatives in 1836). Twilight was also a minister and secondary school principal, building Athenian Hall now part of the Orleans County Grammar School.
- John Mercer Langston
- Edward Garrison Walker, served as a state legislator in Massachusetts.
- Charles Lewis Mitchell was another African American early elected as a state legislator (served a one-year term in the Massachusetts House of Representatives following election in 1866). During the American Civil War he served in the 55th Massachusetts Colored Volunteer Infantry and lost a foot during the Battle of Honey Hill.

== List of African-American officeholders of the United States, 1789–1866 ==
Political Parties

Party affiliation not known Republican

Officeholder	State	Public office	Took office	Left office	Party	Ref.
Wentworth Cheswill (1746–1817)	New Hampshire	Local School Board	1776			
Wentworth Cheswill (1746–1817)	New Hampshire	Justice of the Peace	1805	1817		
Alexander L. Twilight (1795–1857)	Vermont	State Legislator	1836	1837	Whig	
John Mercer Langston (1829–1897)	Ohio	Township Clerk	1855		Free Democratic	
Edward G. Walker (1831–1901)	Massachusetts	State Legislator	January 2, 1867	January 1, 1868	Republican	
Charles L. Mitchell (1829–1912)	Massachusetts	State Legislator	January 2, 1867	January 1, 1868	Republican	

== See also ==
=== Federal government ===
- African Americans in the United States Congress
  - List of African-American United States representatives
  - List of African-American United States senators
  - Congressional Black Caucus
  - Congressional Black Caucus Foundation
- List of African-American United States Cabinet members
- List of African-American officeholders during Reconstruction

=== State and local government ===
- List of African-American U.S. state firsts
- List of first African-American mayors
- List of African-American statewide elected officials

== See also ==
- List of African-American officeholders (1900–1959)

== Bibliography ==
- "Alexander Twilight". Old Stone House Museum.
- Baum, Dale (March 1983). "Woman Suffrage and the "Chinese Question": The Limits of Radical Republicanism in Massachusetts, 1865-1876". The New England Quarterly. 56 (1): 60–77. doi:10.2307/365311. JSTOR 365311.
- Cocom, Mario de ' y (1999). "Cheswell". Secret Daughter: The Blurred Racial Lines of Famous Families. Public Broadcasting Service (PBS).
- "Langston, John Mercer, (1829 - 1897)". Biographical Directory of the United States Congress. United States Congress.
- Fitts, James Hill (1912). Carter (ed.). History of Newfields, New Hampshire, 1638-1911. The Rumford Press.
- Hahan, Michael (1998). Alexander Twilight: Vermont's African American Pioneer. Shelburne, Vermont: New England Press. ISBN 978-1-881535-31-7.
- Hewitt, John H. (Autumn 1991). "A Black New York Newspaperman's Impressions of Boston, 1883". The Massachusetts Review. 32 (3).
- Hurst, Ryan (June 11, 2008). "Walker, Edwin Garrison (1830-1901)". BlackPast.org: Remembered & Reclaimed.
- Smith, J. Clay Jr. (1993). Emancipation: The Making of the Black Lawyer, 1844-1944. Philadelphia: University of Pennsylvania Press. ISBN 9780812216851.
- Walton Jr., Hanes; Puckett, Sherman C.; Deskins Jr., Donald R. (2012). The African American Electorate: A Statistical History. Congressional Quarterly Press. ISBN 9780872895089.
- Winter, Kari J. (January 17, 2007). "Twilight, Alexander (1795-1857)". BlackPast.org: Remembered & Reclaimed.
