= Crispus Attucks Club =

American civic organization for African Americans

- Crispus Attucks Association
- Named after: Crispus Attucks (c. 1723–1770)
- Formation: April 1890; 136 years ago
- Founded at: Boston, Massachusetts, United States

The Crispus Attucks Club, also known as the Crispus Attucks Association, is an African American community organization, civic organization and social club founded in 1890 in Boston, and has chapters in various cities across the United States. The group was named for Crispus Attucks, who was the first person killed at the Boston Massacre.

== History ==
In April 1890, the club was founded in Boston, Massachusetts, by local lawyers Edward Everett Brown, Edwin Garrison Walker, and James H. Wolff. The group adopted a constitution, and was presided over by Edward Everett Brown. It was named for Crispus Attucks, who was the first person killed at the Boston Massacre that preceded the American Revolutionary War. The group held commemorations of Attucks on March 5th; and also on Patriots' Day. The annual dinner in 1894 was held at the Quincy House in Cambridge, Massachusetts. The club activities included group discussions of African American–related concerns, local politics, social and sporting events, cultural and literary discussions, and fundraisers.

In the late 19th-century, the Crispus Attucks Club was one of the largest African American social clubs in the state of Massachusetts, and the Lebanon Daily News newspaper described it as a "leading colored organization of the state." Additionally chapters were established in Joliet, Illinois; New York City; Greenwich, Connecticut; York, Pennsylvania; Jacksonville, Florida; Chicago; and San Francisco (later known as the Bayview Neighborhood Community Center). The Chicago chapter had hundreds of members that worked for the United States Post Office, which eventually unionized.

A book titled, 85 Years of Community Building (2017) was published and includes descriptions of the leadership and community building efforts of members.

== Chapters ==
- Boston, Massachusetts, founded 1890 as the first club
- New York City, founded 1931
- York, Pennsylvania, founded 1931
- Greenwich, Connecticut, founded 1941
- Chicago, founded 1942
- San Francisco, founded 1944, and later known as the Bayview Neighborhood Community Center
- Joliet, Illinois
- Jacksonville, Florida
- Harrisburg, Pennsylvania
- Mansfield, Ohio
- Washington, D.C.

== Notable members ==
- Edward Everett Brown, lawyer, civil rights activist, president of the Boston chapter
- Lafayette M. Hershaw, civil rights activist, member of the Washington, D.C. chapter
- Edward G. Walker, politician, founder of the Boston chapter
- James H. Wolff, lawyer, founder of the Boston chapter

== See also ==
- Big Five of Bayview
