= George Frost (New Hampshire politician) =

American politician

George Frost (1720–1796) was an American seaman, jurist, and statesman from Durham, New Hampshire. He was a delegate for New Hampshire in the Continental Congress from 1777 to 1779.

George was born in New Castle, New Hampshire, on April 26, 1720. His father, John Frost, who had been a British naval officer, died when he was twelve. He moved to Kittery, Maine, and was cared for by his uncle, William Pepperrell. As a young man he went to sea in one of his uncle’s ships. He was at sea over twenty years, many of them as captain of a merchant vessel.

He returned to New Castle in 1760, when he’s still following a mercantile career. After marrying in Durham, he finally settled there in 1769. Frost was made a justice of the Strafford County, New Hampshire, court of common pleas in 1773, and would remain in that post until 1791.

In 1777, New Hampshire sent Frost as a delegate to the Continental Congress, where he served until 1779. On his return he was named to the state’s Governor’s Council in 1781. The Council at the time functioned as the upper house of the state legislature, and he served there until 1784.

George Frost died on June 21, 1796, at home in Durham. He is buried in Pine Hill Cemetery.

His son, George Frost II, was born in 1765 and succeeded him in business.
