= Pine Hill Cemetery (Dover, New Hampshire) =

Cemetery in Dover, New Hampshire

- Interactive map of Pine Hill Cemetery

Details
- Established: 1730
- Location: Dover, New Hampshire
- Country: United States
- Coordinates: 43°11′9″N 70°52′13″W
- Owned by: City of Dover
- No. of graves: >20,000
- Website: Official website
- Find a Grave: Pine Hill Cemetery

Pine Hill Cemetery is located in Dover, New Hampshire, and was first used as a burial ground in 1730.

== Notable interments ==
Following are interments of notable people:

- Edward Everett Brown (1858–1919) American lawyer, civil rights leader
- James Monroe Buckley (1836–1920), American Methodist doctor, preacher, and editor
- Daniel Meserve Durell (1769–1841), U.S. congressman, elected to represent New Hampshire as an at-large delegate from 1807 to 1809
- George Frost (1720–1796), Revolutionary War Continental Congressman from 1777 to 1779
- Jonathan Grout (1737–1807), U.S. congressman elected to represent Massachusetts's 8th District, serving from 1789 to 1791
- Joshua James Guppey (1820–1893), Civil War Union brevet brigadier general
- John Parker Hale (1806–1873), U.S. congressman, Civil War U.S. senator, elected as a Democrat to represent New Hampshire as an at-large delegate to the House of Representatives in 1843–1845
- William Hale (1765–1848), U.S. congressman; first represented the 3rd District from 1809 to 1811, then as an at-large delegate from 1813 to 1817
- Joshua Gilman Hall (1828–1898), U.S. congressman representing New Hampshire's 1st District from 1879 to 1883, mayor of Dover in 1866, member of the New Hampshire Senate in 1871, member of the New Hampshire House of Representatives in 1874, and U.S. District Attorney for New Hampshire from 1874 to 1879
- Noah Martin (1801–1863), New Hampshire governor
- Charles Henry Sawyer (1840–1908), 41st governor of New Hampshire from 1887 to 1889
- Fred Wesley Wentworth (1864–1943), architect known for many buildings in downtown Paterson, New Jersey, and for the Lucius Varney House in Dover.
- John Wentworth, Jr. (1745–1787), Revolutionary War Continental Congressman
