= Lewis Charlton (educator) =

American slave, speaker in the temperance movement

Lewis Charlton was an orator, school founder, and temperance advocate. He was born a into slavery in the United States in about 1814. He died a speaker in the temperance movement in England, and lived a very eventful life inbetween. Crippled at 14 months, he was freed in 1842, and founded a school after the Civil War for the education of 'Negro' children in Westminster, Maryland. What we know of his life comes from biographies published late in his life, census data from the time, and newspaper accounts of his book tour and lectures, until his death in Sheffield in 1888.

== Early slave life ==
Lewis Charlton was born in 1814 on a farm in Frederick County, Maryland. The farm was located near Frederick and Point of Rocks, Maryland, around the township of Buckiston. His mother and father were both slaves. His father was sold shortly after the child's birth to a man living in Georgia.

Charlton's first owner was Ignatius Davis who owned Charlton's mother. Davis' wife treated her slaves with severity. She whipped them until they passed out, then would wash their wounds with salt water, and have them return to work in the fields by the next day. At two weeks of age, Davis's wife forced his mother to leave him alone all day, while she worked for her mistress. For some 14 months, she locked Lewis in the slave quarters early each morning until late each night without food, water, companionship, or clothing. Reportedly, on one cold day he kicked his blankets away from his feet, and when his mother returned she found her son's feet had frozen. Although she replaced the blanket, his toes froze that night and fell off with the blanket the next morning. Thus crippled, he did not begin working until the age of six.

When Charlton was seven, Davis died and Lewis was placed on the auction block for sale. He retells that his mother was crying and had him remove his socks to reveal his stumps, in hopes that no one would buy him. Lewis was sold to a man who intended to teach him to be a cooper, but before he could begin learning the trade, his new master's wife died and he was sold again. He was sold to a Mr. Fornistock who was mean, particularly when he was drunk. Fornistock was a tanner by trade. He had Charlton spread hides that were so heavy he was in danger of falling into the vats. If that occurred he was whipped with a cow whip and Lewis tells that it happened so frequently that he spent months where he could not sleep on his back. Eventually Fornistock's land, including Lewis were sold at a Sheriff's sale.

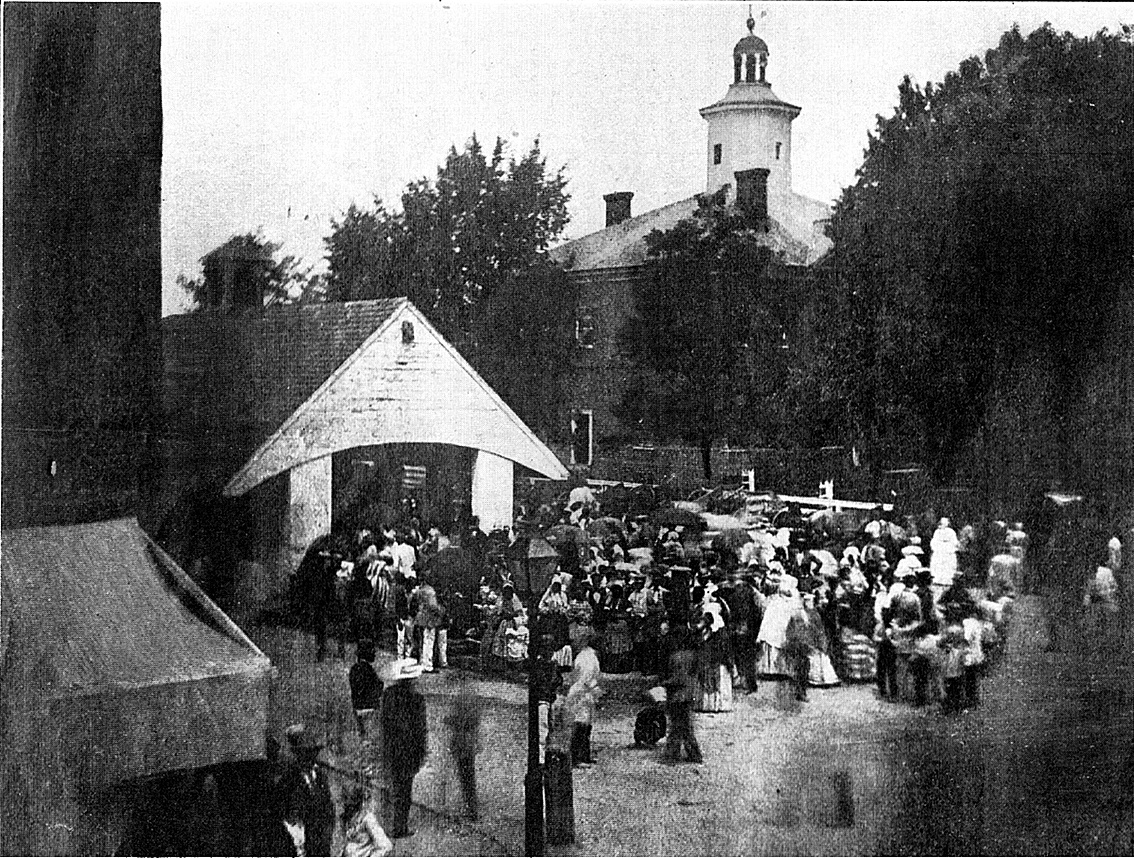
Slave sale, Market House in the town square of Easton, Maryland

The new owner Getinger, expected Lewis to work at all hours of the day, and every day of the week. Prior to being sold to Getinger, Lewis was able to visit his mother and sister on Sunday, but he was now expected to work every day including Sundays. After three years with Getinger, Charlton's legs had frozen stiff while cutting logs in the deep snows. Thinking Lewis might die, he was returned to his mother, who was now freed and living nearby as a laundress. Subsequently he was unable to walk for nine months, but once he was mobile he was sold immediately to a James Davis. Charlton was still only 15 years old.

As Davis' slave, Lewis endured three years of field labor. His legs were damaged to the point that they bled frequently into his shoes. Three years later, Charlton was sold to a Mr. Richardson. For the first time in his life he was separated from his sister, with whom he had been fortunate to stay with. Charlton remained with Richardson until he was 28 years old.

== Emancipation ==
At age 28 he received his manumission from his owner; however, unsure of his future, he chose to live with a stonecutter named George Burroughs. A year later, Charlton moved to Harford County, Maryland. Here Charlton worked with Isaac Rogers, a large iron manufacturer. Charlton found that he was treated as badly as he had been while a slave, but he continued his employment with Rogers for 16 years. He then moved to the home of William Gladding. He worked as a farmhand for three years, earning a wage of $16 a month, which included the cost of housing. Charlton continued working for Gladding until his marriage. Gladding owed Charlton $235 which he was unable to secure, despite an attempt to sue for his wages in court. Charlton was forced to return to work. In 1862 Lewis moved to a town named Westminster, Maryland, where he worked as a mason.

== Personal life ==
Lewis' father was Manuel Charlton and from the tales told by his mother in one biography, Manuel was brought over from Africa on a slave ship and was sold on to Georgia while Lewis was still a baby but in the other, they were both, 'born slaves.' When Lewis was about 17 years of age, his mother, who had remarried after gaining her freedom, moved to Pennsylvania and not long after, his sister was sold off and moved far away; neither were heard from again.

According to census records, by 1850, Lewis married Mary and they lived in Harford County, Maryland. In 1853 they had a daughter, Martha, and a son, Edward, born in 1856. Later they moved to Westminster in Carroll County, Maryland and Mary worked as a cook at Western Maryland College after it opened in 1867.

== African American school ==
By the time the American Civil War was over, Charlton, who was illiterate, wanted to educate the young black youth in the surrounding area. Lacking the funds to build a school, he travelled to Baltimore to raise money. In Baltimore he had a cold reception, so in 1866 he traveled to Boston to raise funds. Here he acquired nearly $1,000 and a teacher, named Mr. Whitmore, who was willing to travel to Westminster and teach black children. Finally Charlton established the first African American schoolhouse and church in Westminster. The school prospered for four years; for two years with Whitmore as teacher, and for two years with a woman named Mary Cleveland as teacher. When Charlton's funds were depleted he attempted to raise more but he was unsuccessful. In 1870 the school closed. In 1872 free public schools were mandated for Negro children.

These African American schools were to be under the control of the existing county and district boards which already had major issues in the adequate education of white children. It would not be until 1955 that schools in Maryland would be forced to start the process of integration with Brown v. Board of Education in 1954 and this process was not completed until 1967 with mixed success.

== See also ==
- Border states (American Civil War)
- Slave narrative
- History of slavery in Maryland

== Sources ==
- Sketch of the Life of Mr. Lewis Charlton, and Reminiscences of Slavery. S. l.: s. n., ?. by Edward Everett Brown
- The Life of Lewis Charlton University of Alberta, archives.
- Lewis Charlton (b. 1814 - d. ?) Archives of Maryland (Biographical Series).
