= Black Heritage Trail of New Hampshire =

Nonprofit organization in the U.S. state of New Hampshire

- Abbreviation: BHTNH
- Formation: August 29, 1994; 32 years ago (as Portsmouth Black Heritage Trail)
- Founded at: Portsmouth, New Hampshire, U.S.
- Headquarters: 222 Court Street, Portsmouth, New Hampshire, U.S.
- Field: African American history and culture
- President: Gene Martin
- Executive Director: JerriAnne Boggis
- Website: blackheritagetrailnh.org

The Black Heritage Trail of New Hampshire (BHTNH) is a nonprofit organization based in the U.S. state of New Hampshire that works "to promote awareness and appreciation of African American history and culture in New Hampshire through education and public programs including creating appropriate memorials at significant locations within the state."

The organization grew from the work of the Portsmouth Black Heritage Trail, which was founded in 1994 in Portsmouth, New Hampshire. The group offers learning opportunities throughout the year including outreach to schools, guided and self-guided tours, mobile programs, lectures, and workshops. The organization also has programing aimed towards the public, such as the Black New England Conference, which started in 2006, and the Elinor Williams Hooker Tea Talk series, which started in 2017.

== History ==
After the Portsmouth Black Heritage Trail was first established in the 1990s, it eventually included 24 sites within the city of Portsmouth, New Hampshire. The trail began in an effort to make the history of black people visible to residents and visitors to Portsmouth. As of 2024, there were markers in 14 additional towns and cities in New Hampshire and two markers in nearby Kittery, Maine. There were five more scheduled to be unveiled in 2025. These markers were added as part of a Mapping Untold Stories program to share the rich history of Black people in New Hampshire.

The first official tour outside of Portsmouth was in the town of Hancock, in western New Hampshire where Jack Ware, a formerly enslaved man, lived in the 1700s.

The Black Heritage Trail of New Hampshire acquired its own separate location in the summer of 2018 when the organization moved into 222 Court Street in Portsmouth. The house at that address has historical value due to its age, being from 1740, and has connection to a Portsmouth minister.

== Elinor Williams Hooker Tea Talks ==
The Elinor Williams Hooker Tea Talks are a yearly series of different public panel discussions that speak on a variety of social and historical subjects involving the African American community. The event was created by and is held by the Black Heritage Trail of New Hampshire. The event is named after Elinor Williams Hooker, an African American woman who lived in the state of New Hampshire and who was heavily involved in the community as well as being an activist; she died in 2012. The event has been held since 2017 and remains one of the organization's main yearly events. It is held in the month of February, along with some Tea Talks in other months.

== Black New England Conference ==
The Black New England Conference was startedin 2006 by the Black Heritage Trail of New Hampshire. Each year, the conference takes on a different topic of African American history, culture, and experience. The conference has covered subjects such as art, New England sports, the LGBTQIA+ community, and others as they relate to the African American community. The 19th edition of the conference is scheduled for October 2025.

== Historic markers ==
The following historic markers have been unveiled, per the organization's website and media reporting:

City or town	Address	Honoring	Year	Ref.
Andover, New Hampshire	105 Depot Street (Andover Historical Society)	Richard Potter	2022	
Derry, New Hampshire	Rail Trail behind Sabatino's	William Hobdy	2023	
Dover, New Hampshire	131 Central Avenue (Pine Hill Cemetery)	Edward Everett Brown and Nellie Brown Mitchell	2023	
Dunbarton, New Hampshire	339 Stark North Highway (Page's Cemetery)	Scipio Page	2024	
Exeter, New Hampshire	223 Water Street	Black Revolutionary War soldiers	2024	
Greenland, New Hampshire	Post Road at Greenland Parade Gazebo	Ona Judge	2025	
Hampton, New Hampshire	2 Academy Avenue (Lane Memorial Library)	Dinah Small Burdoo	2025	
Hancock, New Hampshire	181–201 NH Route 123	Due family and Jack	2021	
Jaffrey, New Hampshire	15 Laban Ainsworth Way (Jaffrey Meetinghouse)	Amos Fortune	2023	
Kittery, Maine	Wallingford Square	Rock Rest	2022	
Kittery Point, Maine	167 Brave Boat Harbor Road (Rock Rest)	Rock Rest	2022	
Manchester, New Hampshire	200 Bedford Street (Millyard Museum)	Enslaved peoples' contributions to the textile industry	2024	
Milford, New Hampshire	123 South Street (Bicentennial Park)	Harriet E. Wilson	2023	
Milford, New Hampshire	19 Maple Street (Nehemiah Hayward Homestead)	Harriet E. Wilson	2025	
Nashua, New Hampshire	67 Amherst Street (Holman Stadium)	Nashua Dodgers: Roy Campanella and Don Newcombe	2023	
Warner, New Hampshire	17 Church Street	Black soldiers	2021	
Windham, New Hampshire	156 Range Road (Cemetery on the Hill)	Peter Thom, Jeffrey, Pompey, and Rose	2022	

=== Special ===
The organization has dedicated one "special historic marker"—located at the Portsmouth Historical Society, it honors Valerie Cunningham, whose work "led to the creation of the Portsmouth Black Heritage Trail".
