= Hopestill Cheswill =

Hopestill Cheswill (also spelled Cheswell; 1712–unknown) was a master housewright in New Hampshire. His houses are considered classic examples of mid-eighteenth century high-end homes, and multiple houses he built are now protected as historic landmarks or as part of museums.

Cheswill was a master housewright and carpenter who worked mostly in the thriving city of Portsmouth. Among other projects, Cheswill helped to build the Bell Tavern on Congress Street and Stoodley's Tavern, which was moved to Strawbery Banke in the 1950s. He also built the John Paul Jones House, now a designated National Historic Landmark and a museum run by the Portsmouth Historical Society. Cheswill also built the Samuel Langdon House, which was later moved to Old Sturbridge Village in Massachusetts.

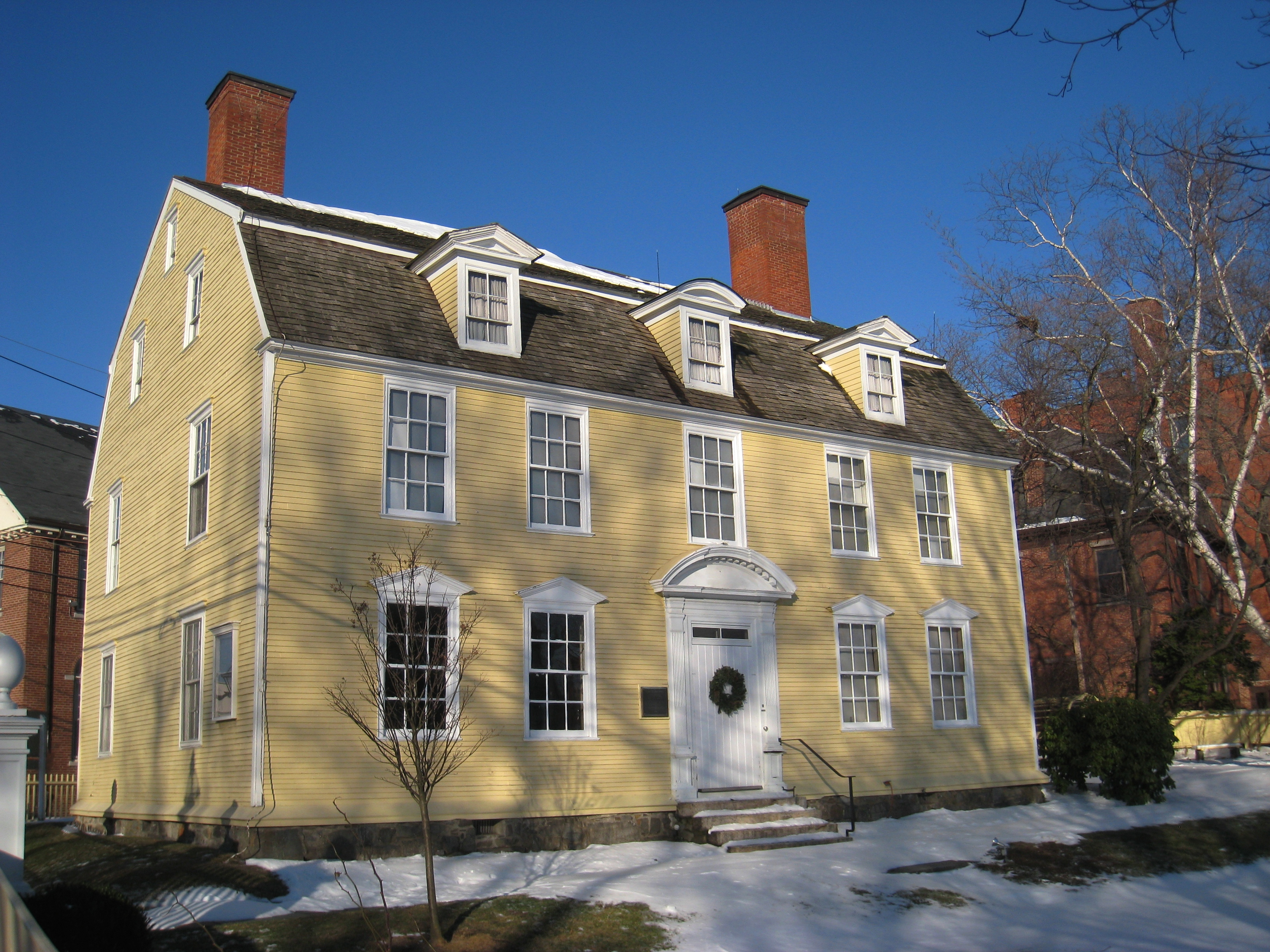
The John Paul Jones House is one of three known Cheswill buildings that is still standing.

Hopestill Cheswill was born free to a white mother and Richard Cheswill, an indentured black laborer in Exeter, New Hampshire, who was the first Cheswill recorded in New England. (Because his mother was free, the boy was free, according to the principle of partus sequitur ventrem, by which children followed the mother's status, which was incorporated into slave law in the colonies.) After completing his servitude, Richard Cheswill purchased 20 acres (8.1 ha) of land from the Hilton Grant. The deed, dated 18 October 1717, is the earliest known deed showing land ownership by a black man in present-day New Hampshire. The land was located in what was to become the town of Newmarket.

Hopestill Cheswill earned enough as a housewright to purchase a total of more than 100 acres (40 ha) of land between 1749 and 1773, which he farmed while working as a housewright. Later, he had part ownership of a sawmill and stream in Durham, New Hampshire, as well as "mill privilege" at another falls, to handle his need for lumber. His prosperity helped provide for his son's education.

Cheswill married Katherine (Keniston) Cheswill, a white woman. They had one child, the educator and town leader Wentworth Cheswill. His prosperity helped provide for his son's education.
