= Edward G. Walker =

American politician (1830–1901)

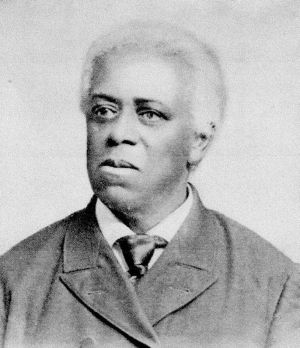
- Edward G. Walker (1830–1901), son of David Walker (abolitionist), one of the first two black men elected to the Massachusetts State Legislature.

Member of the Massachusetts House of Representatives from the 3rd Middlesex district
- In office 1867–1867

Personal details
- Born: 1830 Edgefield, South Carolina
- Died: 1901 (aged 70–71) Quincy, Massachusetts
- Party: Republican (before 1868); Democratic (after 1868)
- Other political affiliations: Negro Party (1896)
- Parent(s): David Walker; Eliza Walker

Edward Garrison Walker (1830–1901), also Edwin Garrison Walker, was an artisan, lawyer, and political leader in Boston, a Massachusetts. He became an attorney in 1861 and was one of the first black men to pass the Massachusetts bar. In 1866 he and Charles Lewis Mitchell were the first two African Americans elected to the Massachusetts state legislature. Walker was the son of Eliza and David Walker, the militant abolitionist and author of An Appeal to the Colored Citizens of the World (1829).

== Early life ==
Edward Garrison Walker was born in Edgefield, South Carolina in 1830 to Eliza Walker, (Note: Most sources say his mother was Eliza, believed to be a runaway slave. Another theory (not a consensus position) is that she was Eliza Butler, from a notable black family in Boston.) the widow of David Walker, who had died in early August 1830. (Note: The Bench and Bar of the Commonwealth of Massachusetts stated that Walker was born in 1835. If he was born in 1835, then David Walker would not have been his father, and this was two years after his mother's marriage to Alexander Dewson. Hinks says this is not likely, because Edwin would have been unlikely to have used the last name Walker if he was the son of Dewson.) At the time when the couple was expecting the birth of Edward, they already had a daughter named Lydia Ann. In 1830 a tuberculosis epidemic in Boston took the lives of Lydia Ann on July 30 and her father David on August 6. David had collapsed and died at the entrance to his store. He was a free black man from Wilmington, North Carolina who had settled in Boston about 1825, where he became a prominent abolitionist.

When Walker died, his widow Eliza was unable to keep up the annual payments of $266 ("a huge sum for Walker") made to George Parkman for the purchase of their home, and she lost it. In his pamphlet Appeal, Walker had earlier written: "But I must, really, observe that generally falls into the hands of some white persons. The wife and children of the deceased may weep and lament if they please, but the estate will be kept snug enough of its white possessor."

Eliza Butler Walker met Alexander Dewson, whom she married on September 19, 1833. He also had a son, Alexander, born about 1830, whom he brought to the family with her and her son Edward. They had a daughter, Margareta, who died at five months of age on April 11, 1837, of lung fever. Dewson was listed as a laborer in the city directory in 1837. (Note: Hinks says that Dewson (or Duson) was not in the city records after 1839.)

By 1848 and at least through 1852, the Dewsons lived on 13 Southac Street in Charlestown. Southac Street is not Phillips Street, located in Beacon Hill. Alexander Dewson died at the age of 46 of consumption (tuberculosis) on May 3, 1851. (Note: The senior Alexander was posthumously bequeathed $1000 for the construction of a house from William H. Bordman, who died on June 15, 1872. Since Alexander had died by this time, there was a question about whether Eliza, son Edward and stepson Alexander were entitled to the inheritance. The second question was whether Alexander was entitled to the entire portion, or if it should be split three ways. The case – John D. Bates & another, administrator, vs. Alexander Dewson, and others – was presented to the Massachusetts Supreme Court. It was decided that Alexander's family should inherit the money and that it should be split equally between his widow Eliza and son Alexander.) The young Edward Walker attended public schools in Charlestown, Massachusetts.

== Leatherwork ==
Walker received training in working with leather as a young man. He established a business that eventually employed 15 people.

== Abolitionist ==
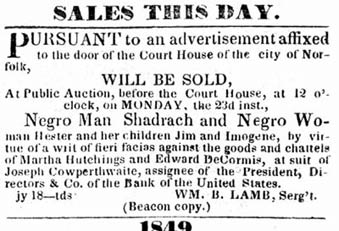
Advertisement for sale of Shadrach Minkins in Virginia, 1849

Walker became an abolitionist as his father had been. In 1851 he collaborated with attorney Robert Morris and activist Lewis Hayden of the Boston Vigilance Committee to gain the release of Shadrach Minkins, a fugitive slave from Virginia who had been arrested in Boston by US Marshals under the Fugitive Slave Act of 1850. The men helped Minkins hide and travel via the Underground Railroad to Canada, where he settled in Montreal. The men were "well-known Boston abolitionists" who were praised for their efforts to obtain Minkins' release. Many Boston residents resisted the 1850 Law, resenting its requirement that officials in free states support slaveholders' efforts to take back slaves.

Walker also worked for equal rights. Blacks in Boston gained integration in city schools for their children in 1855, by a state legislative act after years of lobbying in the city and at the legislature.

== Marriage and children ==
Walker married Hannah Jane Van Vronker on November 15, 1858, in Boston. He was 28 and his bride was 23. Hannah was born in Lowell on October 10, 1835, one of Henry and Lucinda Webster Van Vronker's three daughters. (Note: The transcribed marriage record gives her last name as Van Kronker.)

The couple had a son named Edwin Eugene Walker (abt. 1859-1891 in California) and two daughters: Georgiana Grace (b. abt. 1861) and Eliza Ann (abt. 1863-1866 in Lowell, Massachusetts). The family lived with Walker's mother, Eliza Dewson, also recorded as Susan, in Charlestown. Hannah was not living with the family by 1870.

== Lawyer ==
Having been inspired by Blackstone's Commentaries, which he consulted while trying to free Minkins in 1851, Walker "read the law", serving as an apprentice at the Georgetown, Massachusetts office of Charles A. Tweed and John Q. A. Griffin. He also continued to run his leatherwork business. (Note: Davis said that he studied at Tweed's office in Boston.) He became the first (or third) black lawyer in the state of Massachusetts when he was admitted to the bar in May 1861 in Suffolk County. (Note: Davis and Valle said that he was the first black to be admitted to the bar in the state; Black Past said he was the third.) He was described as one of Boston's "prominent" attorneys.

== Massachusetts General Court ==
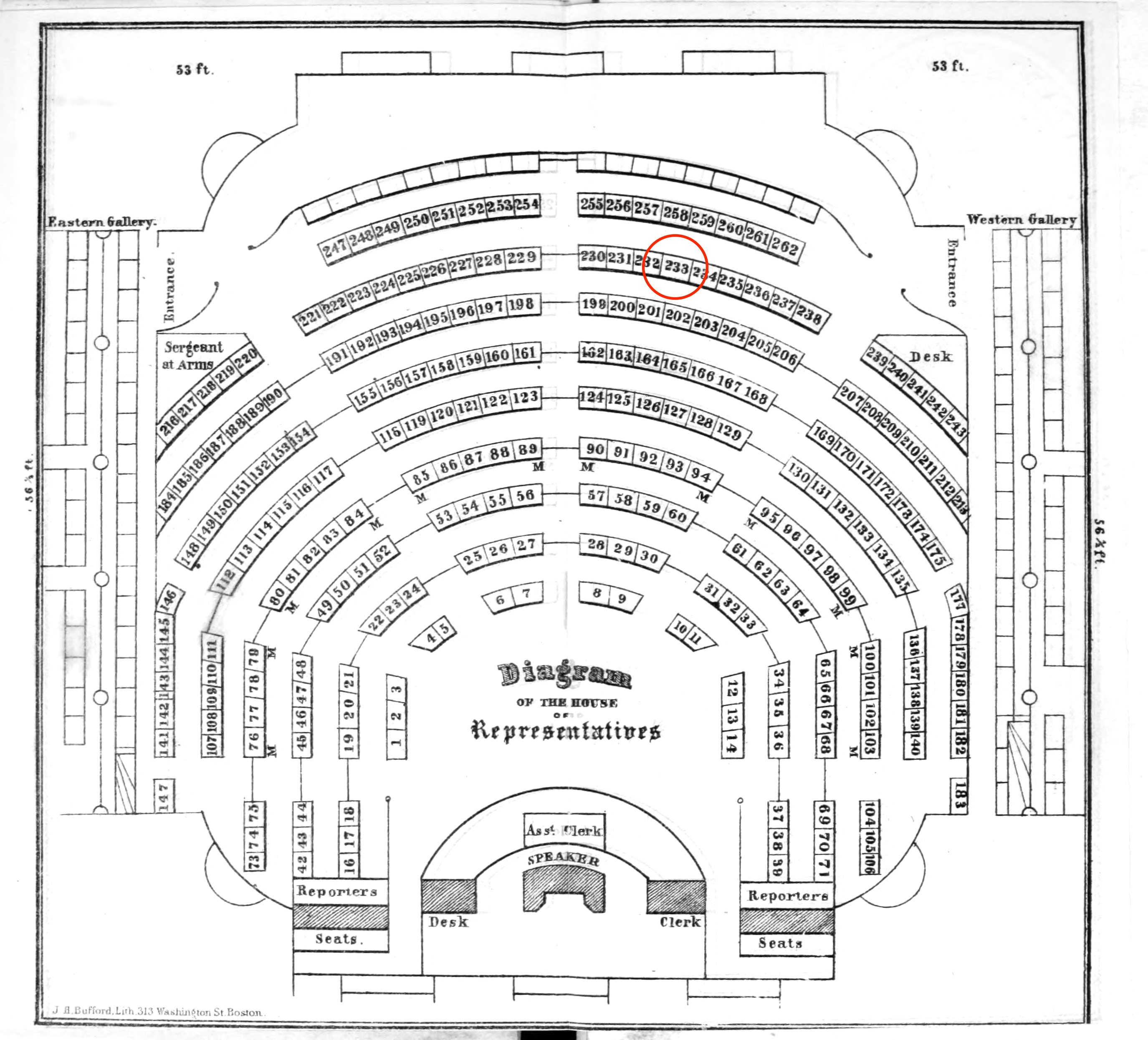
Seating chart for Massachusetts House of Representatives in 1867, showing seat #233 assigned to Walker

In 1866 Walker, representing Middlesex County's Ward 3, and Union Army veteran Charles Lewis Mitchell, representing Boston's Ward 6, were elected to the Massachusetts House of Representatives. They became the first African Americans ever to win election to the Massachusetts General Court. Both men were Republicans.

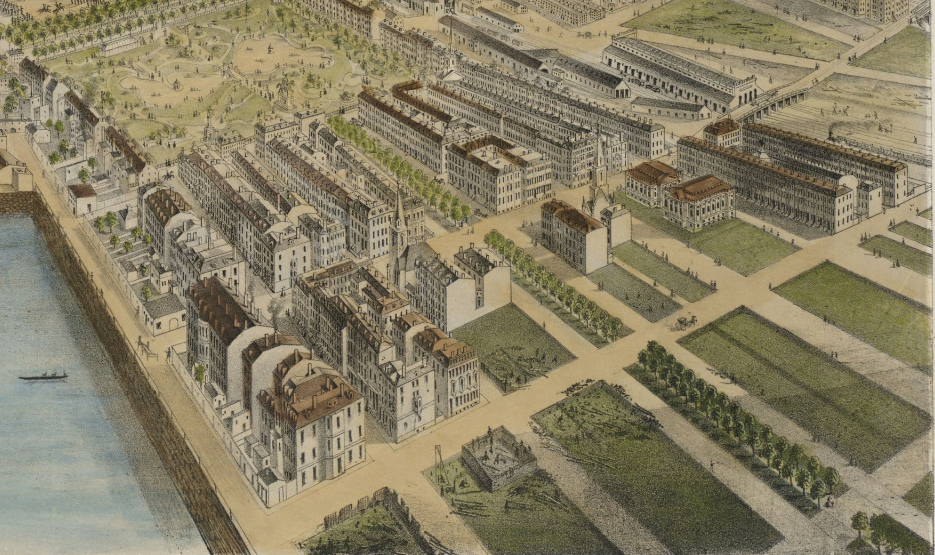
Construction in Back Bay (1870) with Commonwealth Avenue flanking the tree-lined Mall.

On Tuesday, November 6, 1866, Claude August Crommelin remarked in his diary about the otherwise quiet election day:

Only the election of two colored men as representatives in the state legislature made some noise here and gave sufficient matter for conversation, as this is the first election of its kind. Messrs. Mitchell and Walker are the first of the 'despised race' who are called to post such as this one. And that a combination of circumstances has caused that Mr. Walker is representing Beacon Street and Commonwealth Avenue makes the case even more special.

In fact it was Mitchell who represented Boston's wealthy Beacon Street district, while Walker represented a district in Charlestown with a heavily Irish voting base.

As Walker and Mitchell began their one-year terms in the 1867 Massachusetts legislature, the era of post-Civil War Reconstruction was underway. Passage of the 13th, 14th, and 15th amendments to the US Constitution had resulted in the abolition of slavery in 1865, granting full citizenship and protection of the law to freedmen in 1868, and granting suffrage to African-American men to vote and hold public office in 1870. At the same time, states were drafting laws to recognize the new status of freedmen. In the Massachusetts House, Walker opposed the 14th amendment, arguing that its language contained insufficient guarantees against race-based discrimination and disenfranchisement.

Walker's opposition to the language of the 14th Amendment was part of a larger breach with his fellow Massachusetts Republicans. They did not nominate him for a second term. He joined the Democratic Party, as one of many Boston African Americans to switch parties due to dissatisfaction with the Republicans.

== Subsequent political career ==
Walker was nominated as a state judge by Democratic Governor Benjamin F. Butler in 1883, but the nomination was rejected by the Republican majority in the state legislature. They voted to give the position to George Lewis Ruffin, an African American considered by the Republicans to be "loyal" to their party. Walker was nominated for judgeships three times by the governor but rejected by the Republican-dominated legislature each time. Walker's attempts to hold municipal office met the same fate. In 1888, he was nominated as a tax assessor by Boston's Democratic Mayor Hugh O'Brien, but the nomination was rejected by the Republican-controlled board of aldermen.

In 1885 Walker, with wealthy restaurateur George T. Downing and other black leaders, formed the Negro Political Independence Movement. Walker was elected Colored National League president in 1890. He was nominated for United States president in 1896 by the Negro Party.

== Death ==
Walker died of pneumonia on January 13, 1901, in Boston. Julius Caesar Chappelle, an African-American Massachusetts legislator (1883–1886), was among those who spoke at a memorial held for him and for ex-governor Roger Wolcott (Massachusetts politician) at the Kirk Literary Club, according to The Boston Herald.

== See also ==
- African-American officeholders in the United States, 1789–1866
