= Jacques Terzian =

American sculptor (1921–2016)

- Born: Hagop Terzian; August 31, 1921; Fresno, California, U.S.
- Died: August 6, 2016 (aged 94); Walnut Creek, California, U.S.
- Education: Parsons School of Design, University of California, Berkeley
- Occupations: Sculptor, furniture designer, community leader, businessperson
- Spouse(s): Margaret Banner (m. 1949–1970s; divorced); Sally Seymour; Tatiana Troyanos
- Children: 5

Jacques Terzian (né Hagop Terzian; 1921 – 2016) was an American sculptor, furniture designer, community leader, and businessperson in San Francisco. He founded The Point, in Hunters Point Shipyard, which is one of the nations largest artists colonies.

== Early life, family and education ==
Jacques Terzian was born as Hagop Terzian on August 31, 1921, in Fresno, California. His family was Armenian, his parents were immigrants. He attended Fresno High School. After high school he began working as a welder, and moved the San Francisco Bay Area in order to work at the shipyard. He joined the United States Army Air Forces during World War II.

Terzian attended Parsons School of Design in New York City; and the University of California, Berkeley on the GI Bill.

== Early career ==
Terzia and Margaret Banner married in 1949, and together they had five children. The family had lived in Palo Alto, and Terzian commuted by train to San Francisco. He co-founded the design firm of Chambers and Terzian, on Battery Street; the front of the building was retail, and in the back was where he made his furniture. Their marriage ended in divorce in the 1970s.

== Hunters Point art colony ==
In the early 1970s, he was forced out of his business space in a shared warehouse, due to the development of Levi's Plaza. Terzian rented one of the decommissioned Hunters Point Naval Shipyard buildings in 1976 to use as his art studio. He recruited other artist, and by 1983, an artist community had formed. By 1984, Terzian got a sublease and formed "The Point", which grew to be the largest artist colony operating in the nation. In the early 1980s, the Point started hosting open studios on the weekends, which included BBQs and live music. Starting in 1985 and many years after, the US Navy started fighting over the lease with Terzian.

Terzian founded Patterns Ltd., where he designed and built sculptural art from industrial and found materials, as well as custom furniture.

In 2016, The Point still is considered large, with some 250 artists.

== Death and legacy ==
Terzian died at age 94 on August 6, 2016, in his home in Walnut Creek, California. He was survived by his two sons and three daughters, six grandchildren and four great-grandchildren.
