= Hunters Point gantry crane =

Crane in San Francisco, California

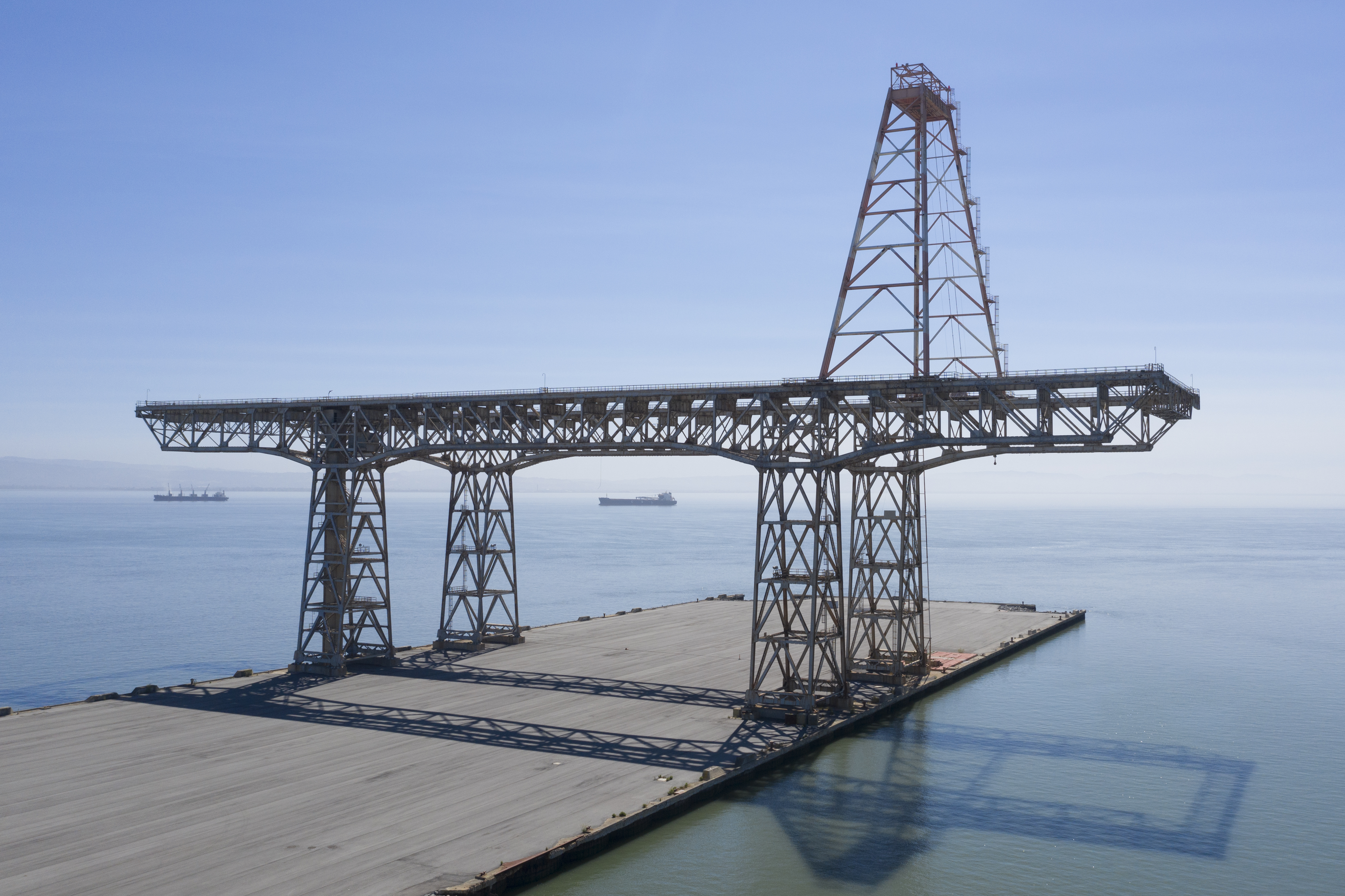
The crane in 2020.

The historic Hunters Point Gantry Crane is gantry crane located at the naval shipyard in Hunters Point, San Francisco. It was constructed in 1947 to repair battleships and aircraft carriers. At 730 feet long and 450 feet tall it boasted a record breaking 630 long ton lift capacity. It was once the worlds largest gantry crane, surpassed by twin gantry cranes in China and Ireland.

It has a 450-long-ton (460 t) capacity and was completed at the site by the American Bridge Company.

When it was first built, it was used to lift 630 tons, which the San Francisco Chronicle reported at the time was the heaviest load ever lifted.

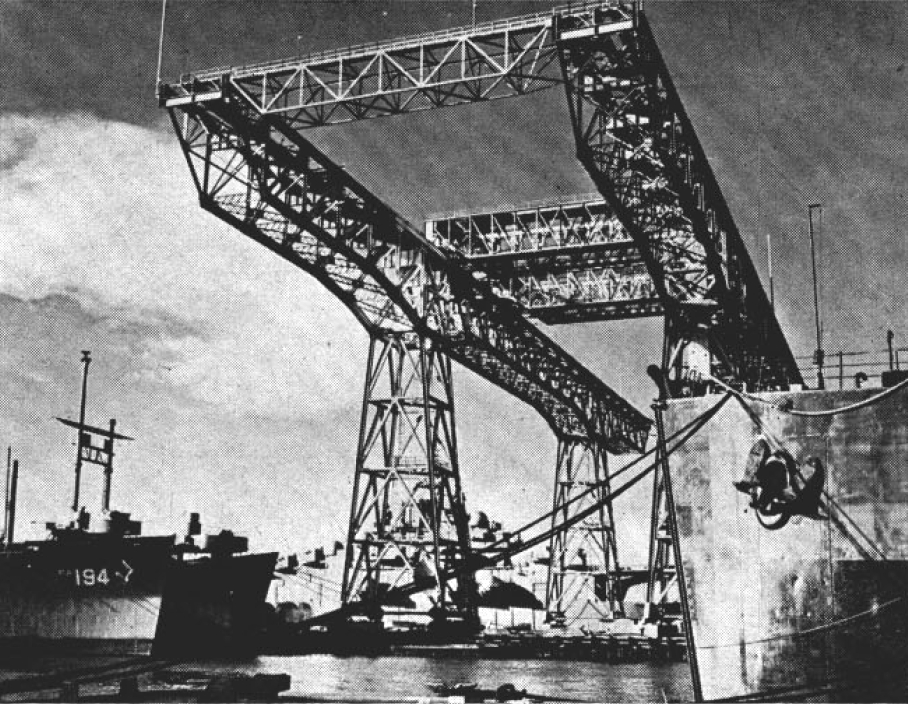
Hunters Point Gantry Crane 1947 - USS Independence docked along north eastern border Gun Mole Pier

In 1959, it was used for Operation Skycatch, where dummy Polaris missiles were fired and caught via a string of arresting cables, before being lowered to the ground for testing. Previous versions of the test had the missiles flung out into the bay and retrieved from the ocean floor.

A large trapezoidal frame was erected atop the gantry crane for the UGM-73 Poseidon missile test facility; the structural members were lifted by Marine Boss in 1967. The addition of the frame brought the total height of the crane to nearly 500 feet (150 m). The crane dominates the landscape in the area, as it is easily visible from miles around.

The Hunters Point Gantry Crane is situated on a broad flat runway designated the Gun Mole Pier- a region the Nuclear Regulatory Commission calls "the loading point for nuclear waste." From 1946 to 1951 the damaged salvaged hulk of the USS Independence was moored along the northern border of the Gun Mole Pier.

Today, the Hunters Point Naval Shipyard Parcel D - where the Gantry Crane is located is a superfund site due to contamination by the military. There is restricted public access.

In 2019 the Hunters Point Community Biomonitoring Program launched the first human Biomonitoring program established in the US at a federal superfund site. HP Biomonitoring Principal Investigator Dr. Ahimsa Porter Sumchai is detecting chemicals and radionuclides of concern along with seven unique chemical and cancer clusters in an estimated 200 residents, workers, shipyard artists and a colony of RV dwellers. Radionuclides of concern include products of nuclear fission Pu-238, Pu-239, U-235, U-233 and Cesium.
