= Levi's Plaza =

Office complex in the United States

Coordinates: 37°48′9″N 122°24′5″W

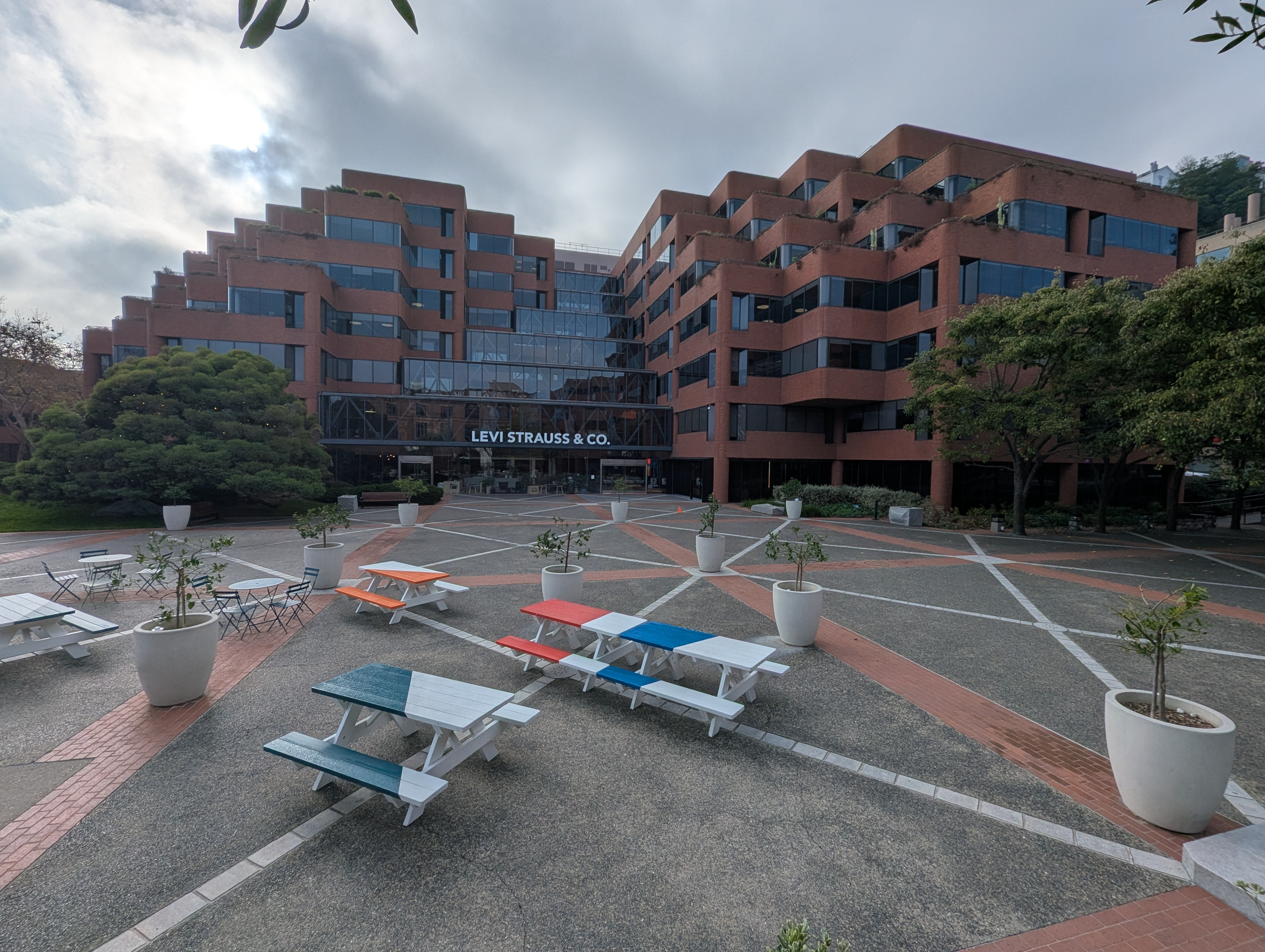
- Levi's corporate headquarters at 1155 Battery, south of the Hard Park fountain
- Interactive map of the Levi's Plaza area

General information
- Location: San Francisco, California, United States
- Construction started: 1979
- Completed: 1981

Design and construction
- Architects: Gyo Obata, Bill Valentine, Robert E. Stauder, Robert L. Canfield, Ted Davalos, James E. Keller, Roger Klemm

Levi Strauss Plaza, also known as Levi Plaza or Levi's Plaza, is an office complex located in North Waterfront district of San Francisco, west of The Embarcadero. It houses the headquarters of Levi Strauss & Co. As of 1998 the company Blue Jeans Equity West is the landlord of the complex. In 1998 the ownership of the company consisted of Equitable Real Estate, Gerson Bakar, Jim Joseph, and Al Wilsey. Steve Ginsberg of the San Francisco Business Times said in 1998 that the complex is "the only true corporate campus" in San Francisco.

== History ==
The site was originally known as Frederick Griffing's wharf. Eventually, the land was built up and the wharf was buried along with Frederick Griffing's ship. When Levi's Plaza was under construction, the buried ship was rediscovered.

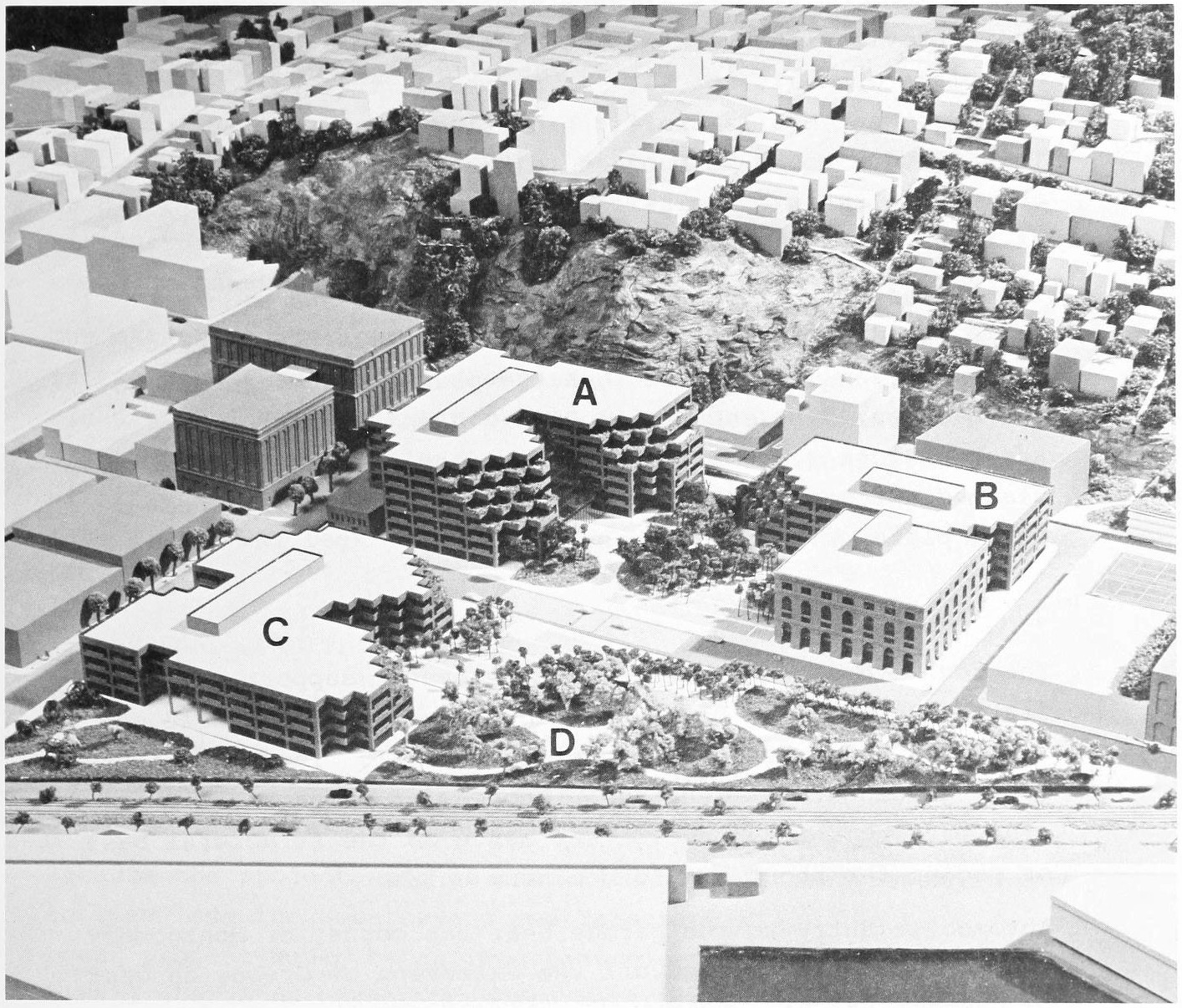
Model of Levi's Plaza design, photographed in 1978; the building labeled A is now at 1155 Battery and serves as the San Francisco headquarters for Levi Strauss & Co.

Levi Strauss Plaza was developed by Interland Development Corp., owned by Jim Joseph, the franchise owner of the Los Angeles football franchise of the United States Football League. Hellmuth, Obata and Kassabaum Inc. (HOK) designed the structure. Levi Strauss & Co. did the interior design, and Gensler and Associates supervised Levi Strauss's efforts. The construction of the 763,000-square-foot (70,900 m^{2}), seven story facility began in 1979 and was completed in 1981. $110 million was spent on the exterior building, and Levi Strauss spent $120 million on interior improvements.

Levi Strauss & Co. first moved to the facility in 1981.

Around 1995 arbitration proceedings between Levi Strauss and the owners occurred, due to negotiations over an increase in rent. Steve Ginsberg of the San Francisco Business Times said that some real estate insiders predicted that Levi Strauss may leave the complex due to the arbitration. The Levi Strauss company, in the 1990s, hired Staubach Co. so it could consider its headquarters options. Ginsberg said that despite the arbitration proceedings that previously took place, Levi Strauss "never seriously considered leaving" the City of San Francisco nor the Levi's Plaza complex.

In a two-year period until 1998 the company workforce had declined slightly to 1,700 employees. Ginsberg said that this was a reflection of a 1997 revenue slump.

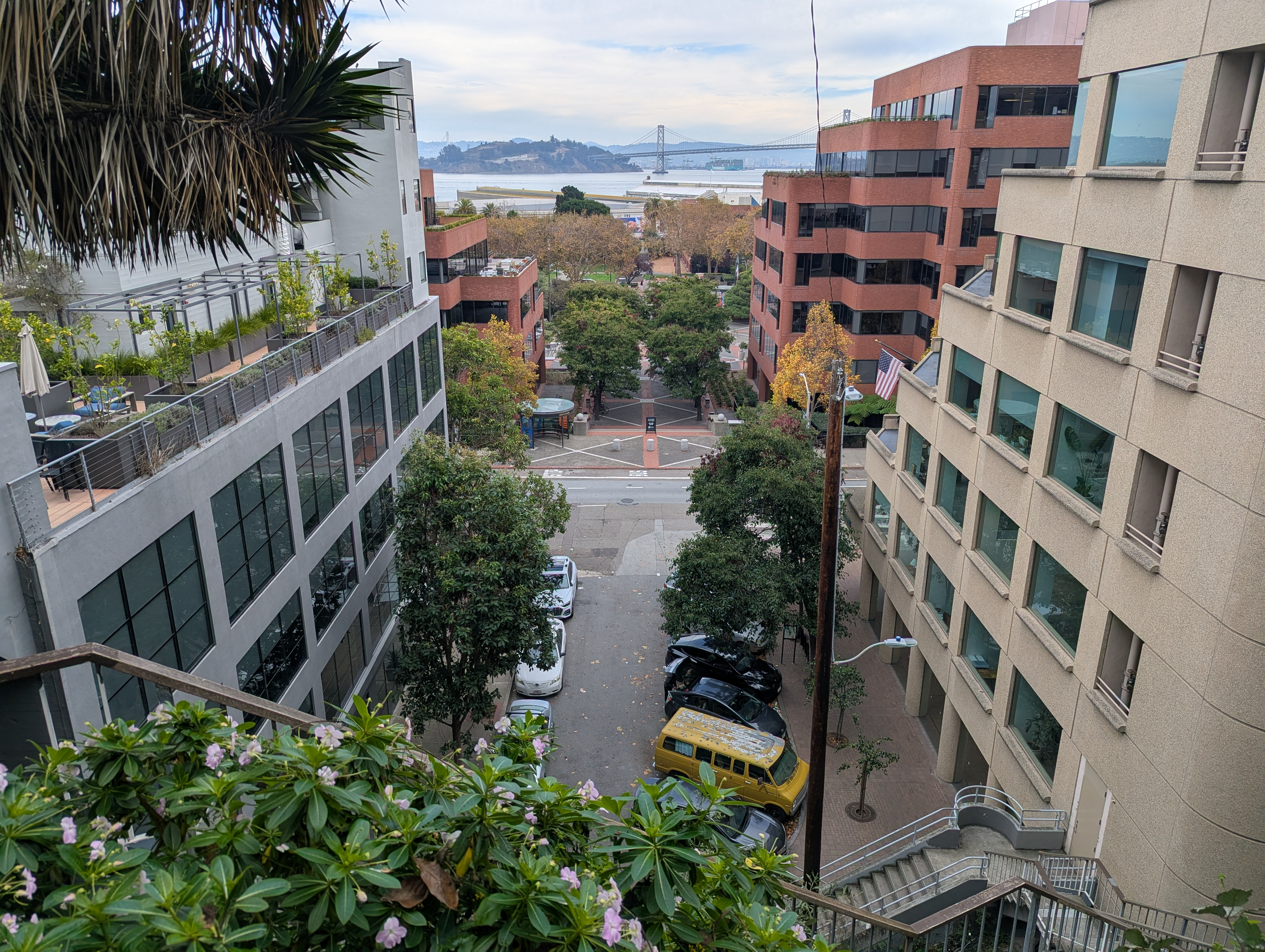
View east into Levi's Plaza from Filbert Steps on Telegraph Hill

In 1998 Levi Straus signed a letter of intent stating that it would renew its lease for 620,000 square feet (58,000 m^{2}). In terms of the square footage, as of March 8, 1998 it was the largest lease deal in San Francisco of the 1990s. Because a decline in the company's workforce, the company reduced the amount of square footage that it held. Levi Strauss announced that it would invest several million additional dollars to renovate the complex, which at the time was 17 years old. The renovation work, scheduled to begin in 1999, was to affect all three major Levi's Plaza buildings, including the one housing the executive offices. Ginsberg said that the new "new, open look" design to be implemented in the renovations was to be "more conducive to team interaction."

In 2008 the San Francisco Business Times reported that Levi Strauss & Co. would consider moving the headquarters out of San Francisco once the lease in Levi's Plaza expired at the end of 2012. In 2009 the company renewed its lease through the end of 2022; the company had 1,200 employees at the facility at the time.

In 2019, the whole building complex was acquired by Jamestown L.P. for an estimated $820 million. In 2021 it renewed the lease yet again, for 354,000 square feet (32,900 m^{2}) square feet (of which one third was subleased by Levi's to other companies), and announced a $50 million project to make the offices carbon neutral.

== Design ==
Selected locations in Levi's Plaza
- New buildings
- Retained buildings
- Parks and open spaces
1 1155 Battery / Store & HQ
2 1255 Battery / Haas Bldg.
3 1160 Battery / Koshland Bldgs.
4 Soft Park
5 1355 Sansome / Saddleman Bldg.
6 101 Lombard
7 240 Lombard / Parc Telegraph
8 1105 Battery / Cargo West Bldg.
9 1265 Battery / Stern Bldg. (Italian Swiss Colony Whse)
10 Hard Park

Bill Valentine, a designer at HOK, said "Someone at Levi's said they wanted it to feel like a well-worn pair of blue jeans. And that's what we tried to do -- it's off the cuff, never symmetrical, it's easy-going and relaxed."

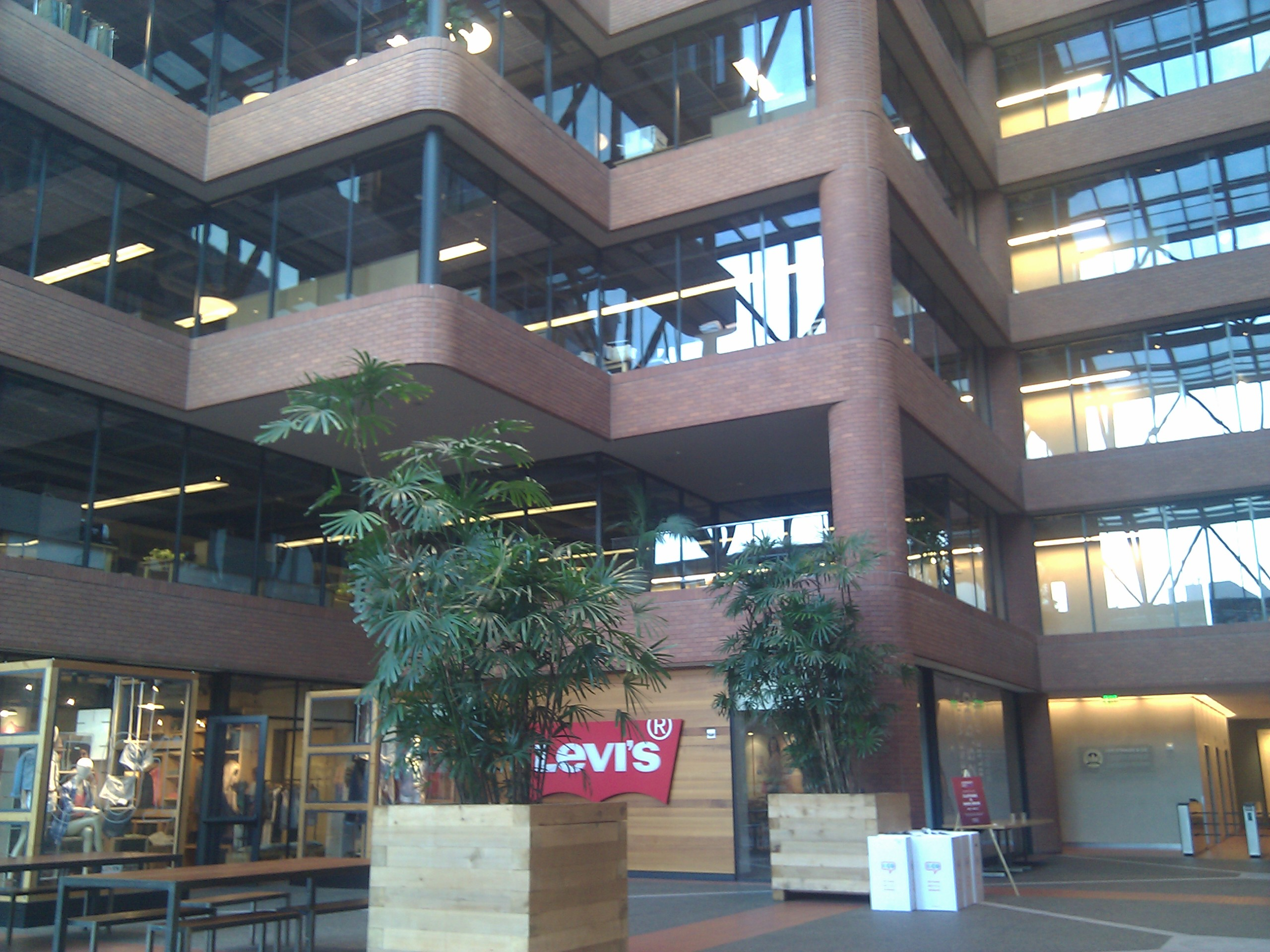
Lobby interior of the Levi's Plaza Store and San Francisco HQ

The concept of the complex borrows the idea of buildings within larger buildings. The corridor gives the atmosphere of "small street in a little town." Each campus building houses a "mini plaza", "sort of like the den in a home." Contrasting materials, such as rubber tile flooring, set off major circulation areas within the campus. The patterned flooring uses an impressionist-like coloring. A large atrium in one of the buildings is placed so that employees of all ranks receive the same view, and not just the higher up employees. Decks providing views of the surrounding city were used to integrate the inside and outside areas. The campus houses an exercise room and various kitchenettes with different themes. The garden den has furniture styled like those used in outdoor settings. The Levi Strauss cafeteria has 30-foot (9.1 m) by 40-foot (12 m) pavilion spaces, each of which have distinct colors and identities.

Levi's Plaza incorporated the Italian Swiss Colony Building into its design, and the complex was designed to fit into the surrounding neighborhood, with its red bricks reminiscent of historic warehouses.

=== Buildings ===
Buildings at the main campus, which is centered on the intersection of Filbert and Battery, are divided into five major blocks:

Block	Img	Bounds	Address	Name	Description
1		Sansome, Filbert, Battery, and Union	1155 Battery	1 Levi's Plaza Store / Levi's SF Headquarters	A seven-story building with a total gross floor area of 364,000 ft^{2} (33,800 m^{2}), south of the Hard Park fountain.
1		Sansome, Filbert, Battery, and Union	1105 Battery	8 Cargo West	Older retained building, San Francisco Landmark #104; built by the Independent Wood Company in 1907 at the corner of Battery and Union. Ground floor was used for commercial spaces, while the second floor had lodging for sailors.
2		Sansome, Greenwich, Battery, and Filbert	1255 Battery	2 Haas Bldg	A five-story building with a total gross floor area of 148,000 ft^{2} (13,700 m^{2}), northwest of the Hard Park fountain.
2		Sansome, Greenwich, Battery, and Filbert	1265 Battery	9 Stern Bldg (aka Italian Swiss Colony Warehouse)	Older retained building, San Francisco Landmark #102; located north of the Hard Park fountain.
2		Sansome, Greenwich, Battery, and Filbert	—N/a	10 Hard Park	Central plaza with inlaid crosses and large fountain; spreads across Filbert into Block 1.
3		Battery, Filbert, The Embarcadero, and Union	1160 Battery	3 Koshland Bldgs	Four-story office buildings with a total area of 220,000 ft^{2} (20,000 m^{2}) south of the Soft Park, divided into East and West buildings.
4		Battery, Greenwich, the Embarcadero, and Filbert	—N/a	4 Soft Park	Approximately 150,000 ft^{2} (14,000 m^{2}) of open space
5		Greenwich, Sansome, and Filbert	1355 Sansome	5 Saddleman Bldg	Four floors, 64,000 square feet (5,900 m^{2}) of space, originally intended for research and computer spaces. In 1998 Levi Strauss & Co. moved its employees out of the Saddleman Building after seven women working there had developed breast cancer. A study determined that the building did not pose a health hazard, but employees feared working in the building. By October 1998, no employees were left. At one time the consumer affairs, engineering groups, and pattern makers were located in the building.

The complex includes a small retail center that serves residents of the area and employees.

In addition, there were two additional blocks to the northwest which were planned for mixed residential and commercial use:

Block	Img	Bounds	Address	Name	Description
6		Lombard, Sansome, and the foot of Telegraph Hill	101 Lombard	6 101 Lombard	Nine and four-level condominium buildings (101 Lombard) with a total of 186 residences totaling approximately 221,000 ft^{2} (20,500 m^{2}) of space on a three-story parking pedestal and commercial shops at street level
7		Chestnut, Montgomery, Lombard, and Telegraph Hill	240 Lombard	7 Parc Telegraph	Eventually developed as a nine-story condominium building (Parc Telegraph) with a total of 125–150 residences and 150,000 ft^{2} (14,000 m^{2}) of living space

Levi's Plaza formerly had the Ice House, a 200,000 square feet (19,000 m^{2}) facility. In 1991 Levi Strauss & Co. acquired it. In 1998 the company planned to redesign the facility.

=== Hard and Soft Parks ===
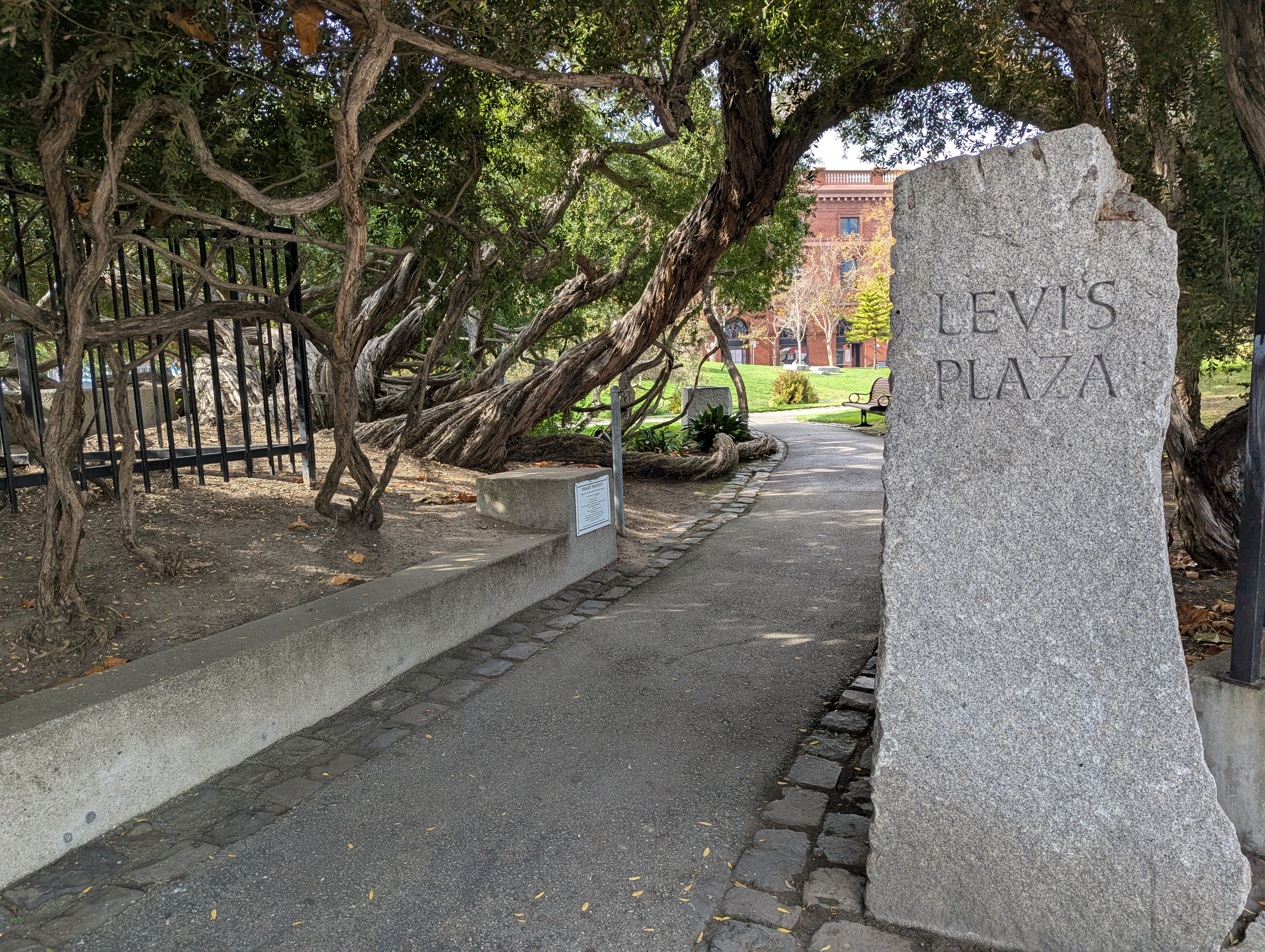
Entrance to the Soft Park from The Embarcadero

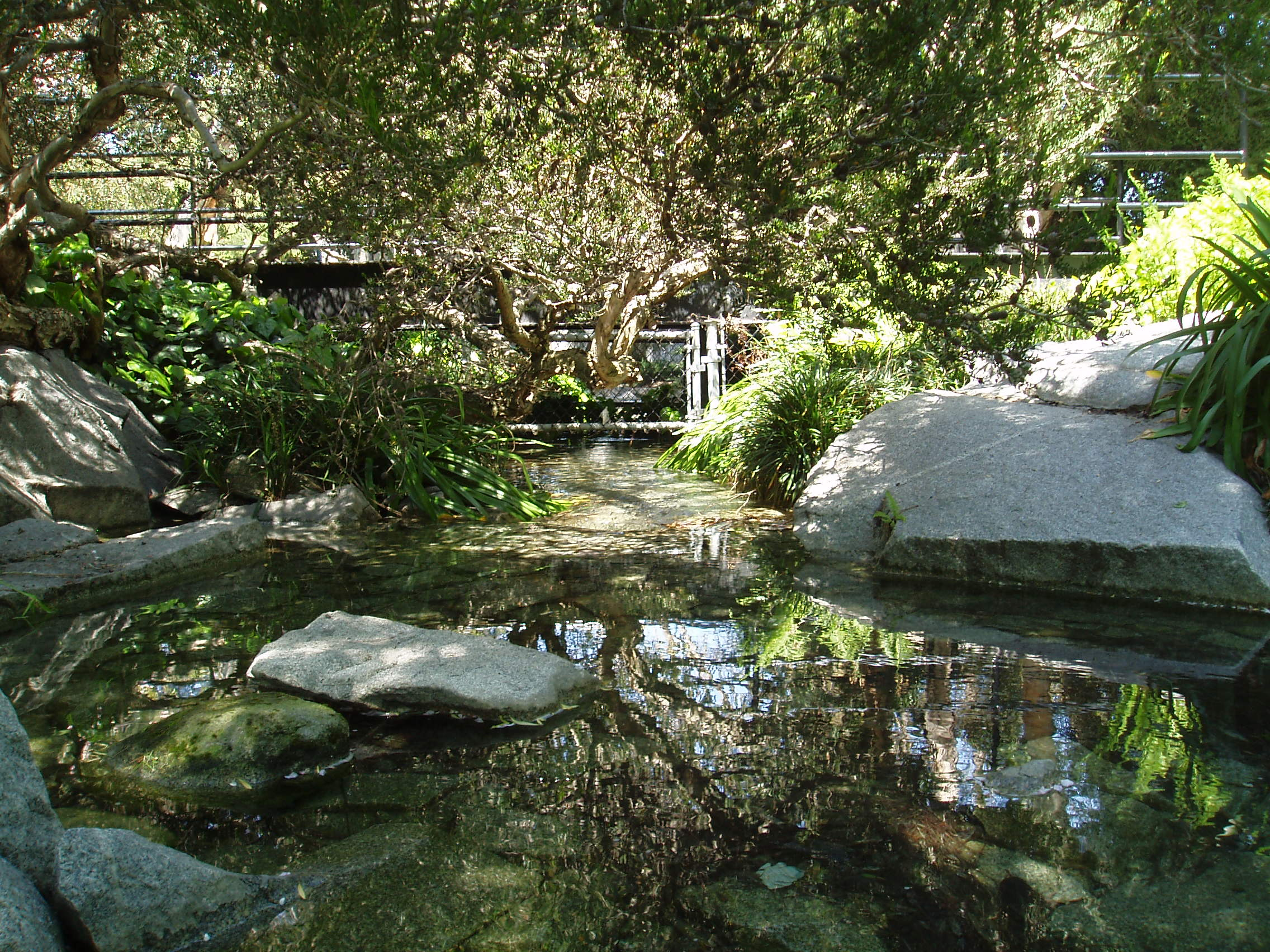
Landscaping in the Soft Park

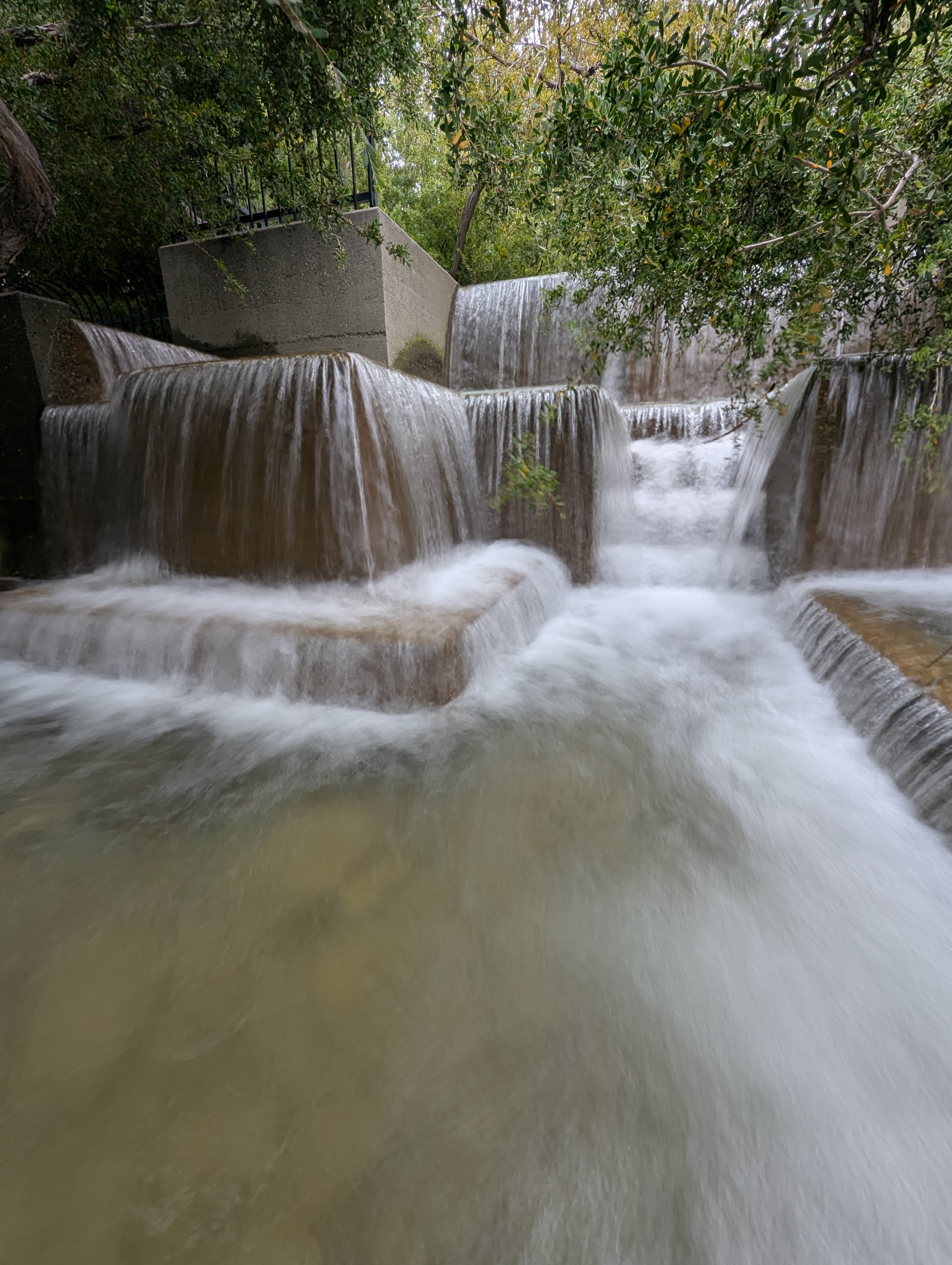
Soft Park fountain

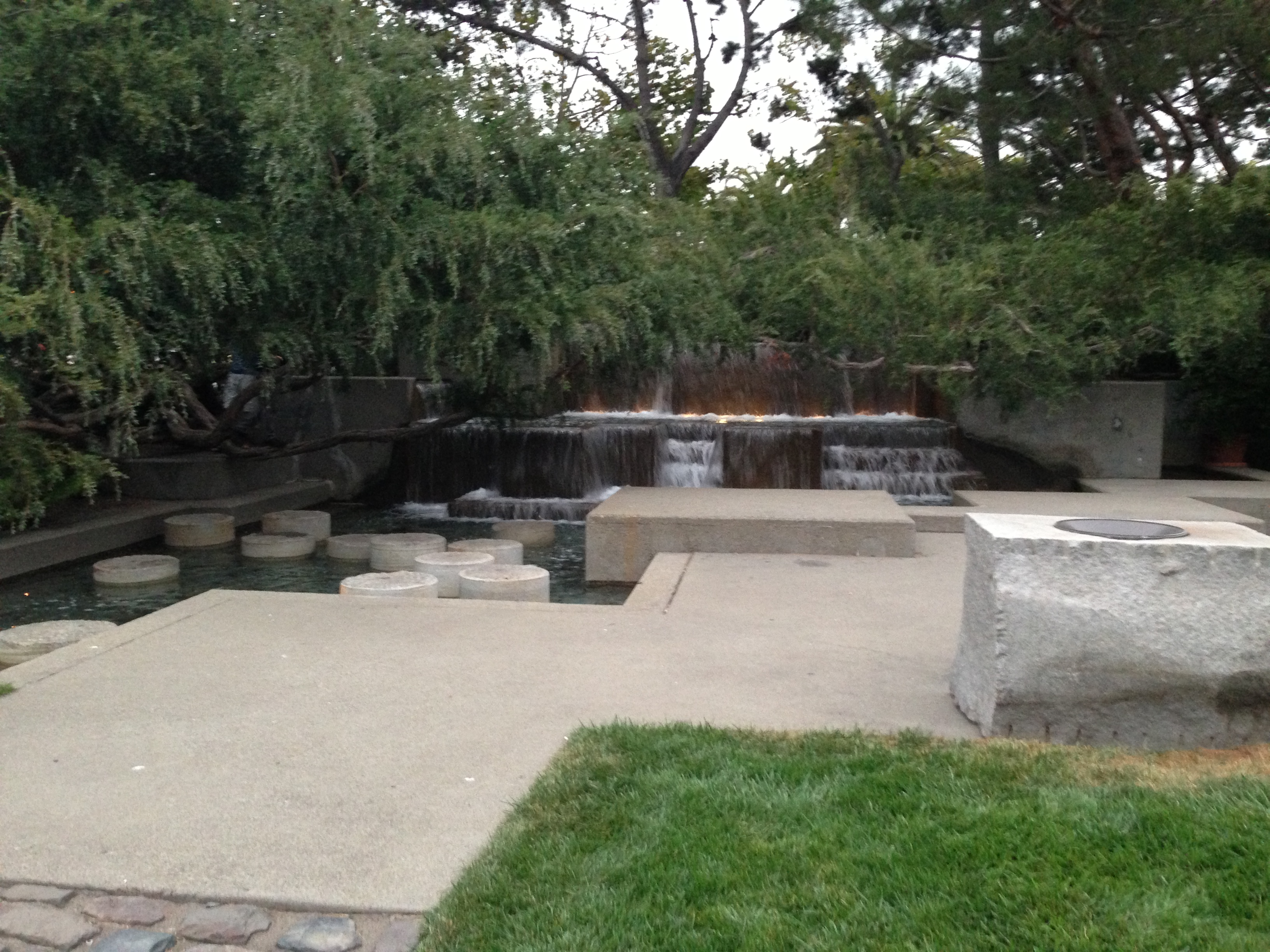
The Soft Park fountain features terraces and seating

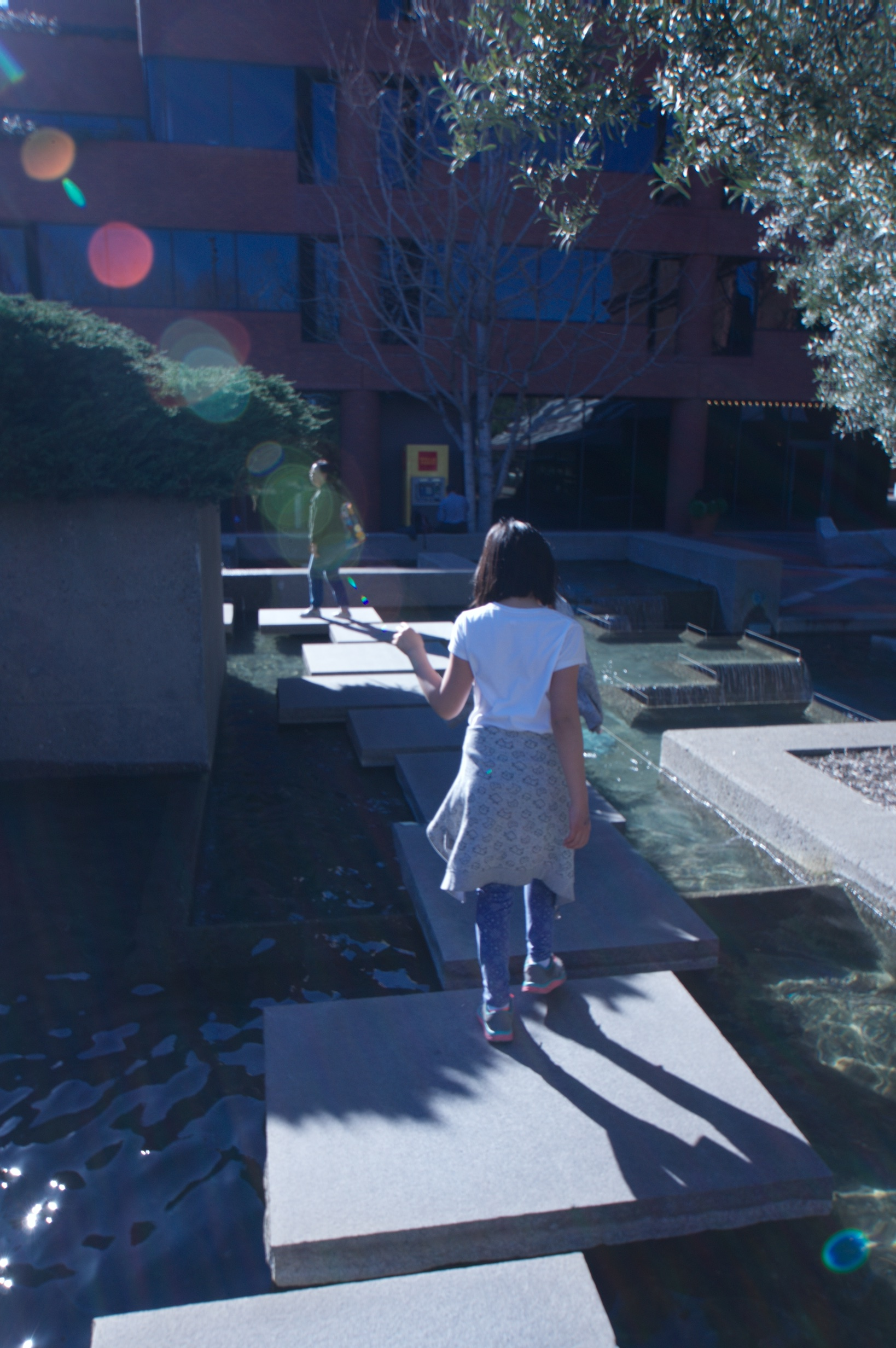
Stepping stones to explore the Hard Park

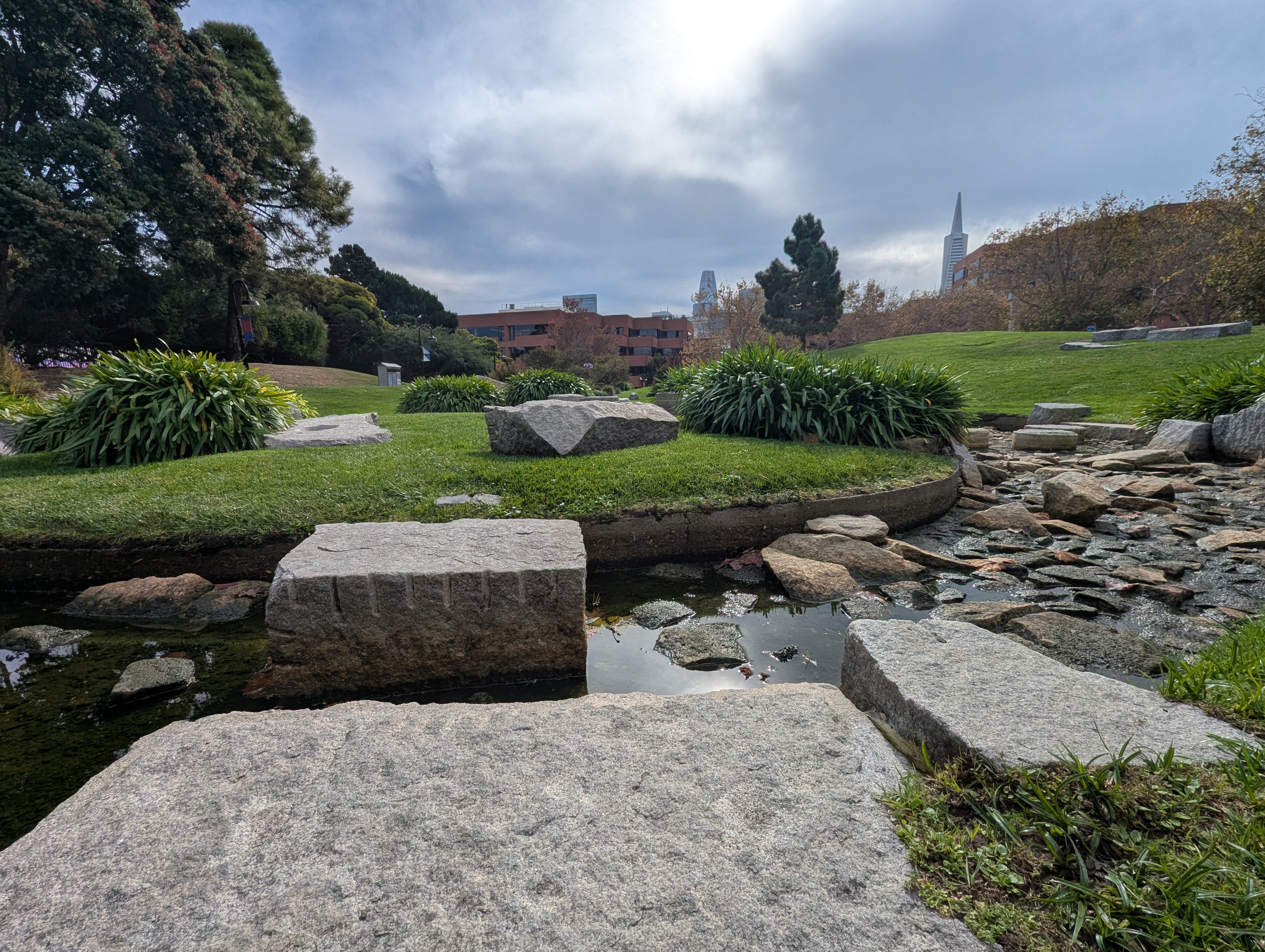
Soft Park creek and granite boulders

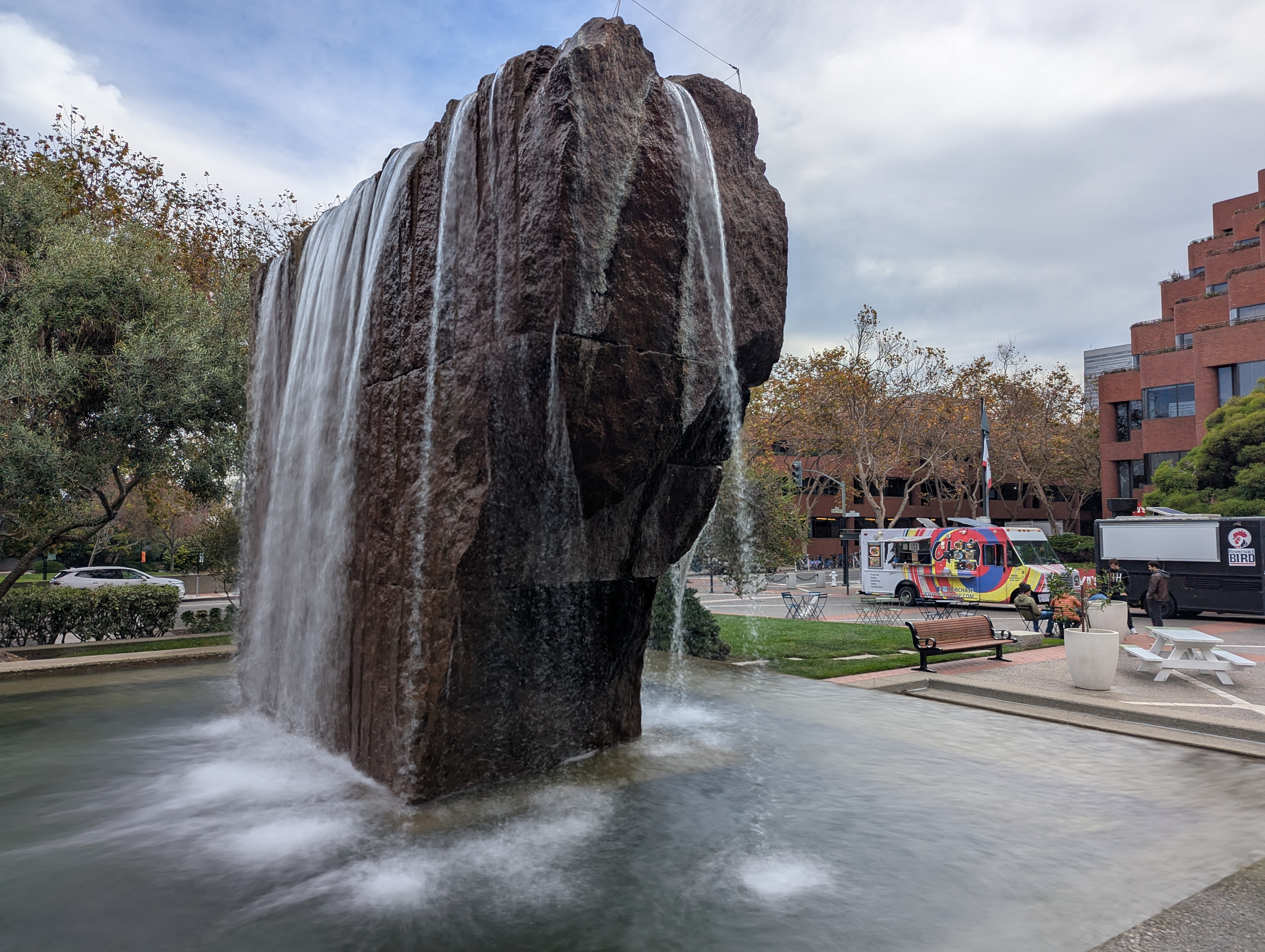
Hard Park fountain centerpiece (pink carnelian granite)

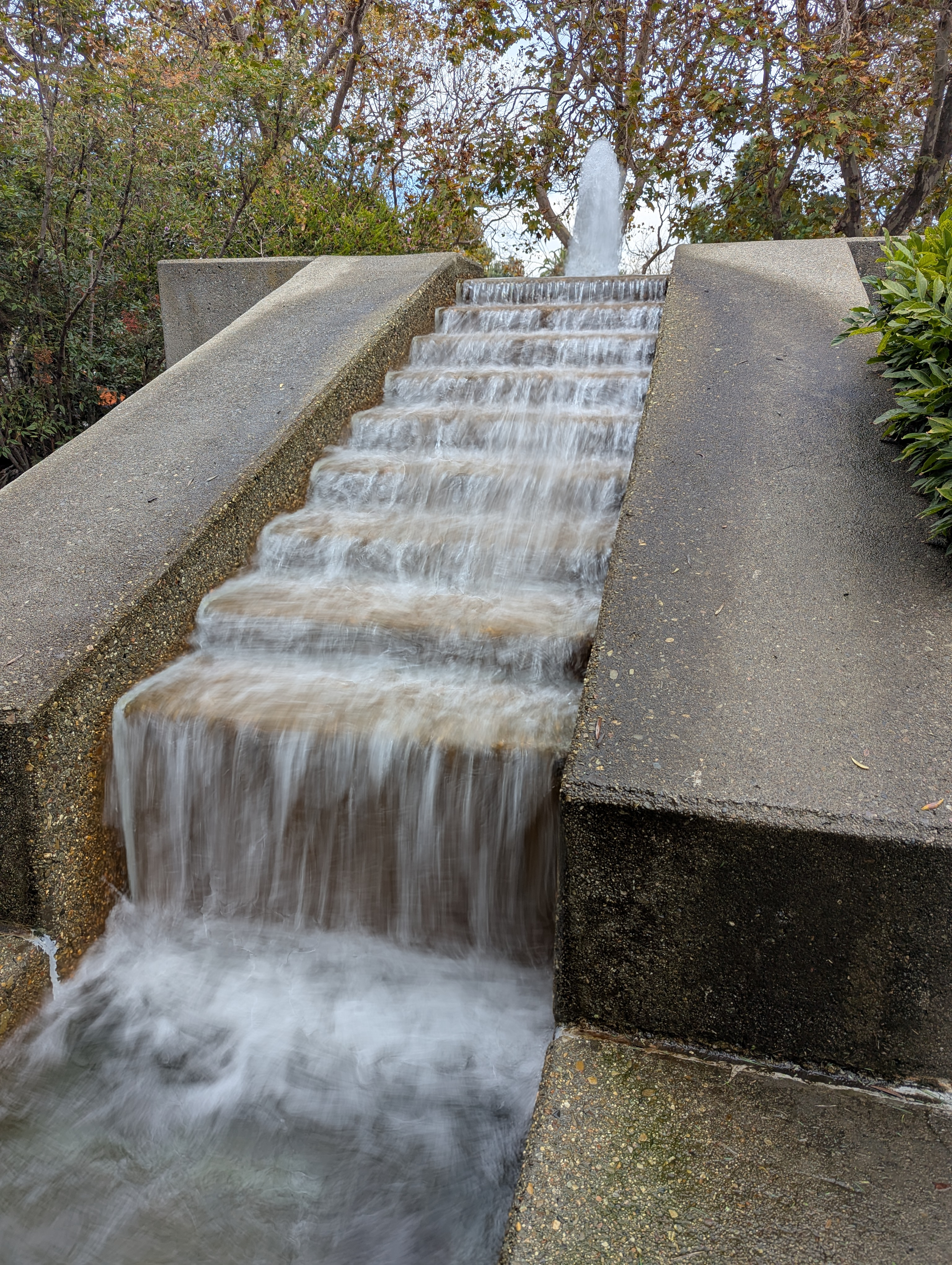
Stepped water feature in Hard Park fountain

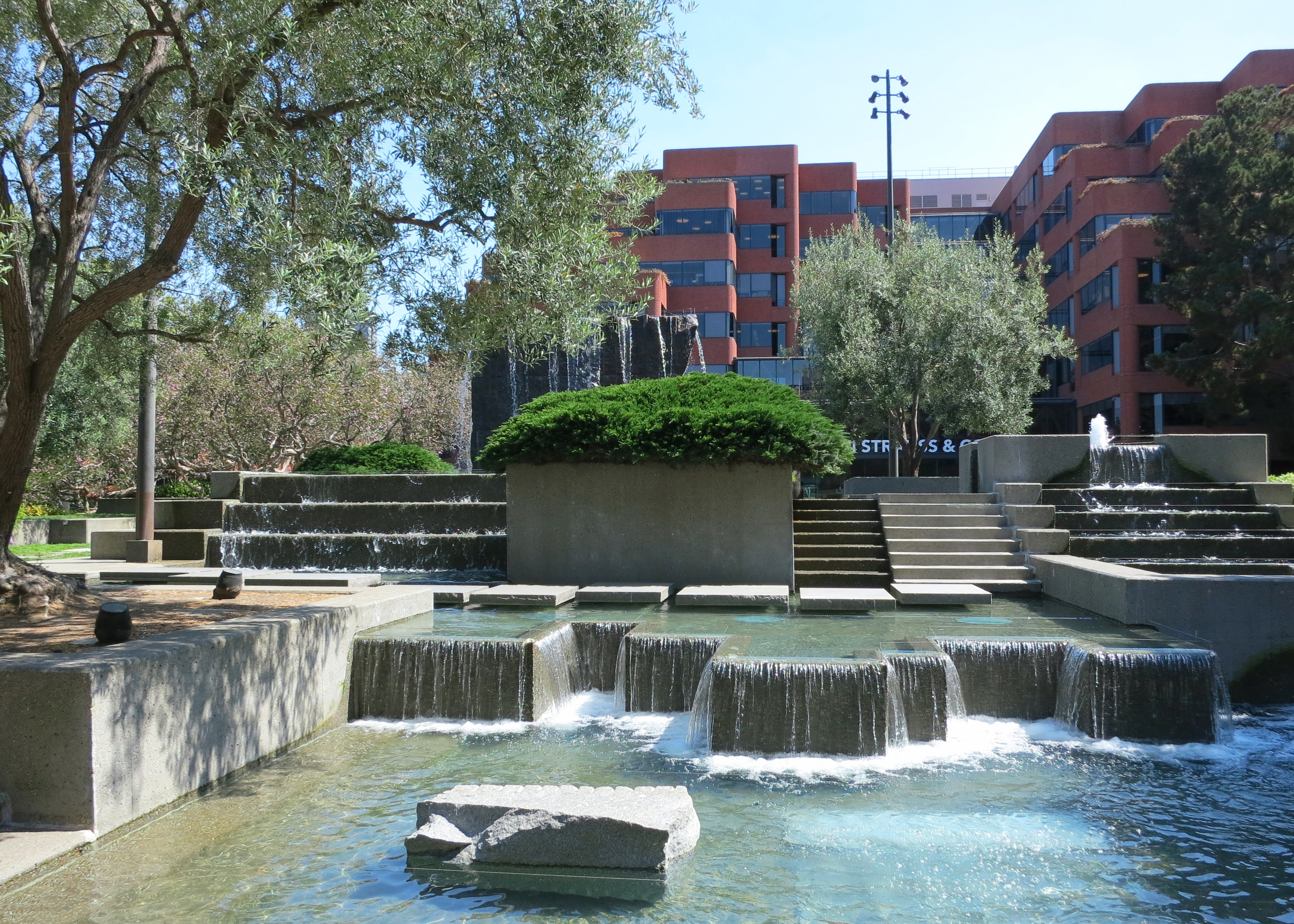
Hard Park fountain, with Levi's Plaza Store & HQ in background

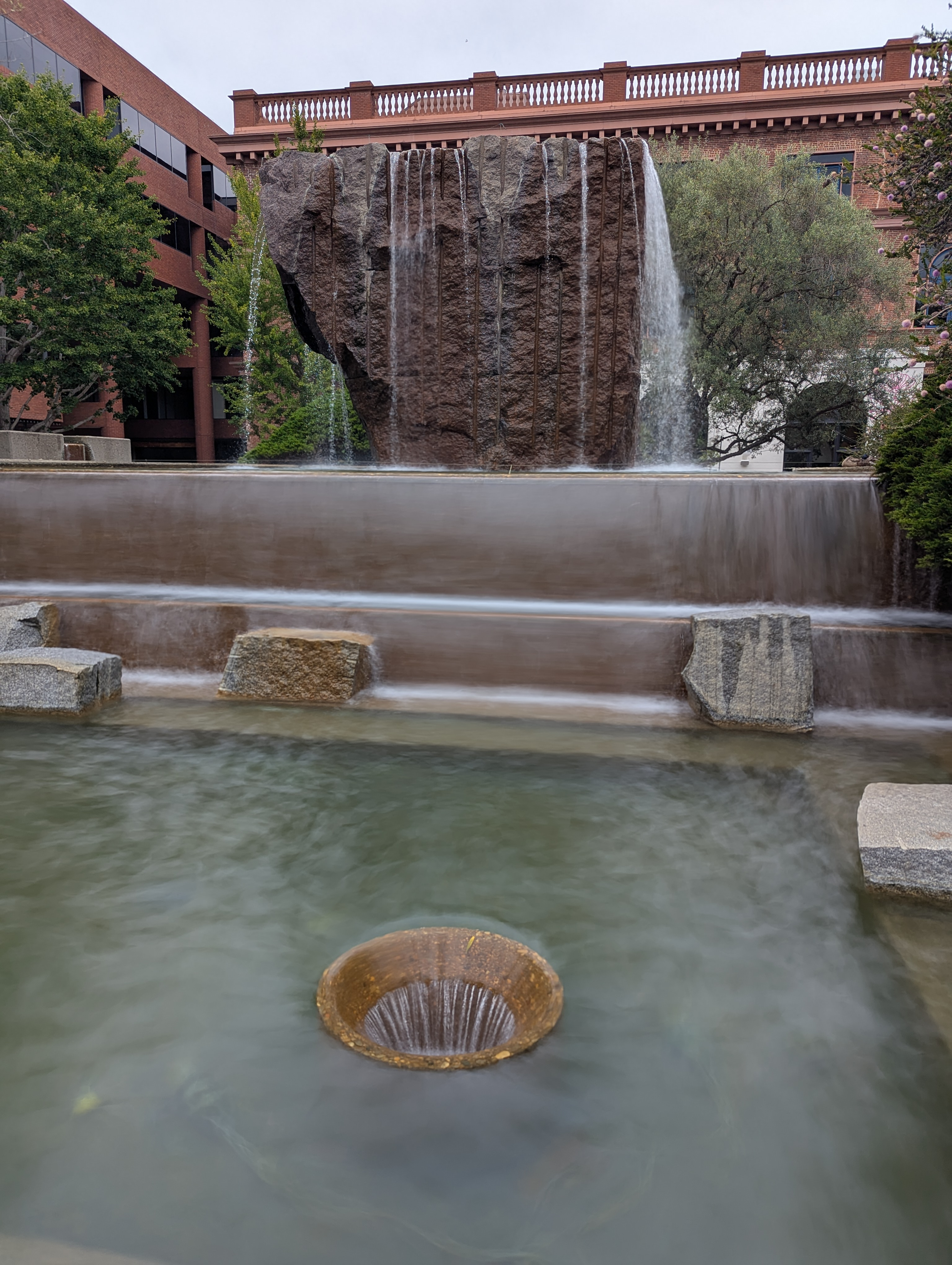
Drain in Hard Park fountain

As of 1998, 66% of the space at Levi Plaza is dedicated to open plazas and park land. Lawrence Halprin, a landscape architect, helped design the Levi Strauss Plaza parks. To coincide with the completion of the Levi Strauss Plaza, several of his design sketches were placed on exhibit. Various community events are held at the park, including Off the Grid food trucks which visit during lunch hours Monday through Thursday.

It is divided by Battery Street into two distinct parts. East of Battery, in a triangular space bounded by The Embarcadero and Union, is the Soft Park, which Halprin described as a "transplanted piece of the Sierras" with a meandering artificial stream, fed by a small waterfall, and winding paths through grassy knolls and rough granite boulders. The Hard Park is west of Battery, hemmed in by the Stern Building (to the north) and the Levi's Plaza Store (to the south) characterized by its hardscaped plaza and large central fountain, with water flowing out of a large pink carnelian granite boulder.

Liz Allen of the Public Library of Science calls the Soft Park "a Zen oasis of willow trees, water, rocks and a meandering path in the busy city." John King, urban design critic for the San Francisco Chronicle, says the Soft Park is the best park along the Embarcadero.

The fountain in the Hard Park features a "hulking piece of carnelian granite" taken from the same quarry that supplied the FDR Memorial in Washington DC.

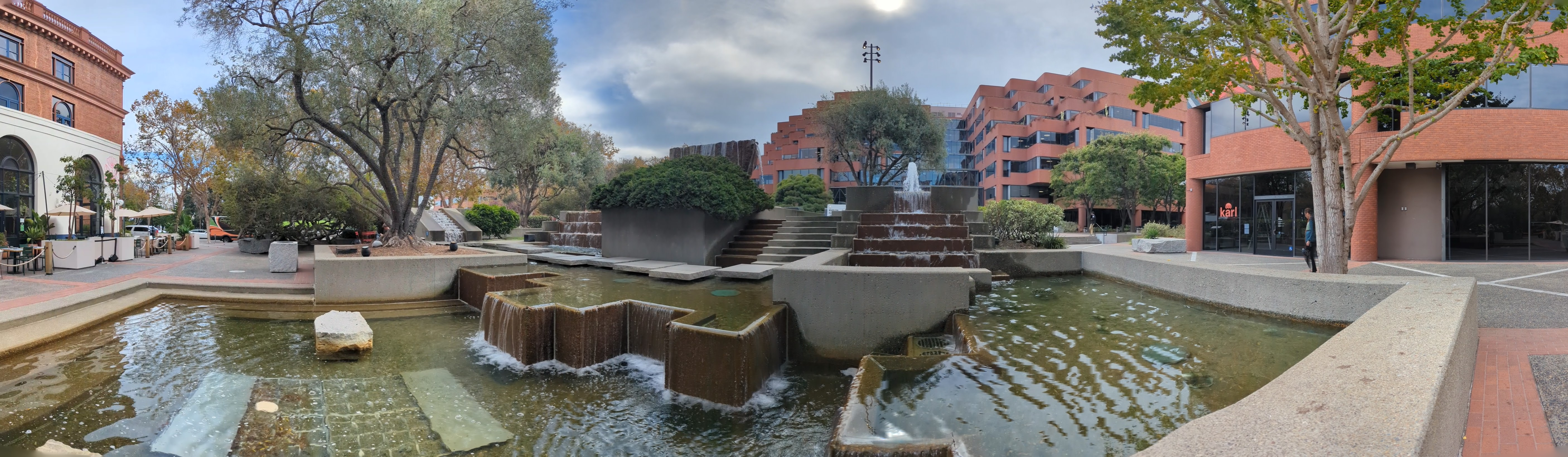
Panorama of Hard Park fountain
