= Hunters Point Naval Shipyard =

Former US Navy installation in San Francisco

- San Francisco
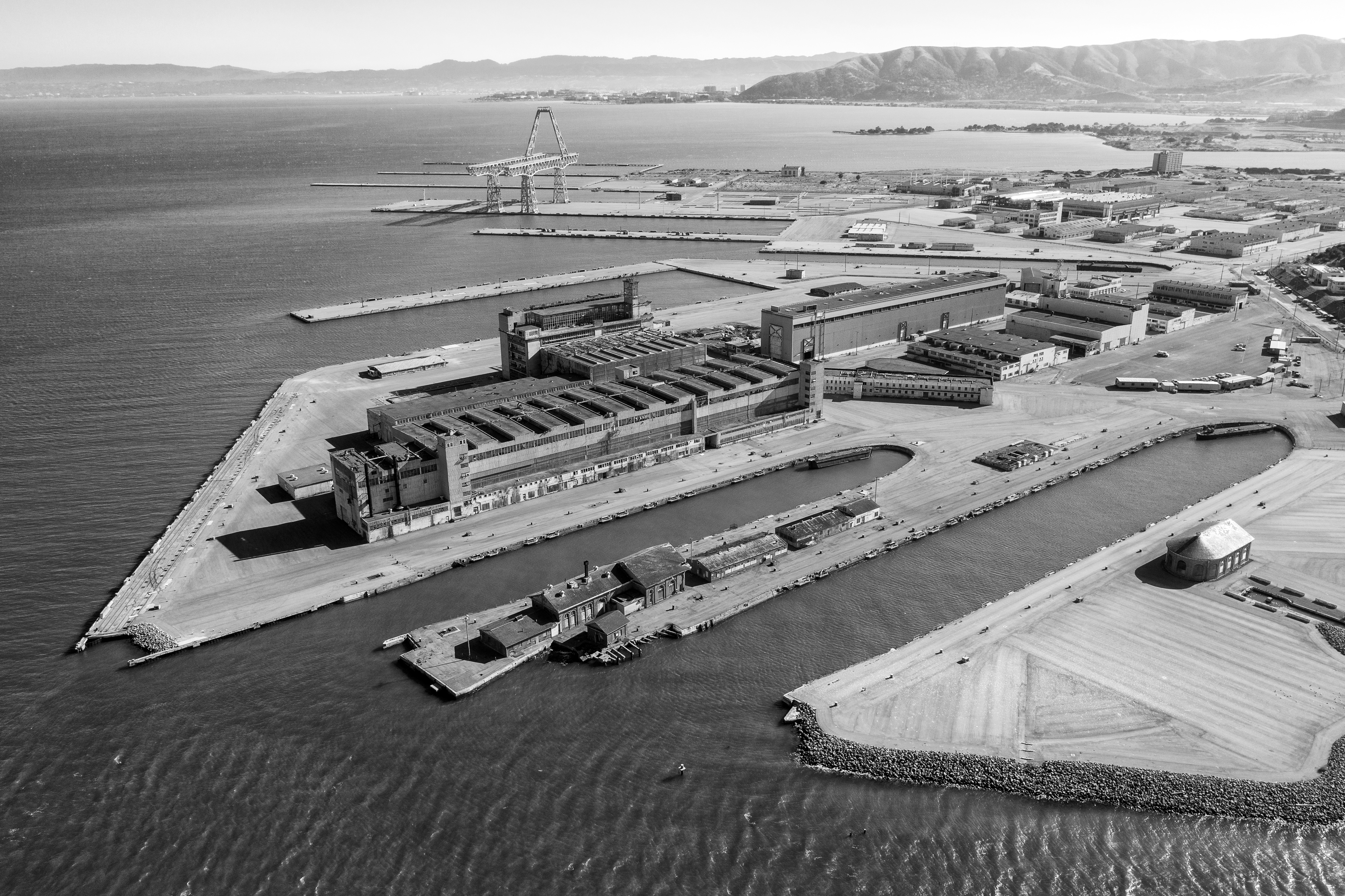
- Hunters Point Naval Shipyard in 2020

Site information
- Type: Shipyard
- Controlled by: United States Navy

Location
- Coordinates: 37°43′32.18″N 122°22′8.19″W

Site history
- Built: 1870
- In use: 1941–1974
- Battles/wars: World War I World War II; Cold War

The Hunters Point Naval Shipyard was a United States Navy shipyard in San Francisco, California, located on 638 acres (258 ha) of waterfront at Hunters Point in the southeast corner of the city.

Originally, Hunters Point was a commercial shipyard established in 1870, consisting of two graving docks. It was purchased and built up in the late 19th and early 20th century by the Union Iron Works company, later owned by the Bethlehem Shipbuilding Company and named Hunters Point Drydocks, located at Potrero Point. Known as "the World's Greatest Shipping Yard", President Theodore Roosevelt trusted his Great White Fleet of battleships to be serviced at Hunters Point in 1907 according to historical records.

The shipyard was purchased by the Navy in 1940, a year before the attack on Pearl Harbor. It began operations the next year as the San Francisco Naval Shipyard, and operated until 1974 when it was deactivated and renamed Hunters Point Naval Shipyard. Used commercially for a time, in 1986 it was taken over by the Navy again as the home port of the USS Missouri battlegroup, under the name Treasure Island Naval Station Hunters Point Annex.

The base was named redundant as part of the Base Realignment and Closure effort in 1991 and was closed permanently in 1994. Since then the site has been part of a Superfund cleanup effort to remediate the remains of decades of industrial and radiological use. Parcels have been sold as they were remediated, mostly for condominium development.

== History ==
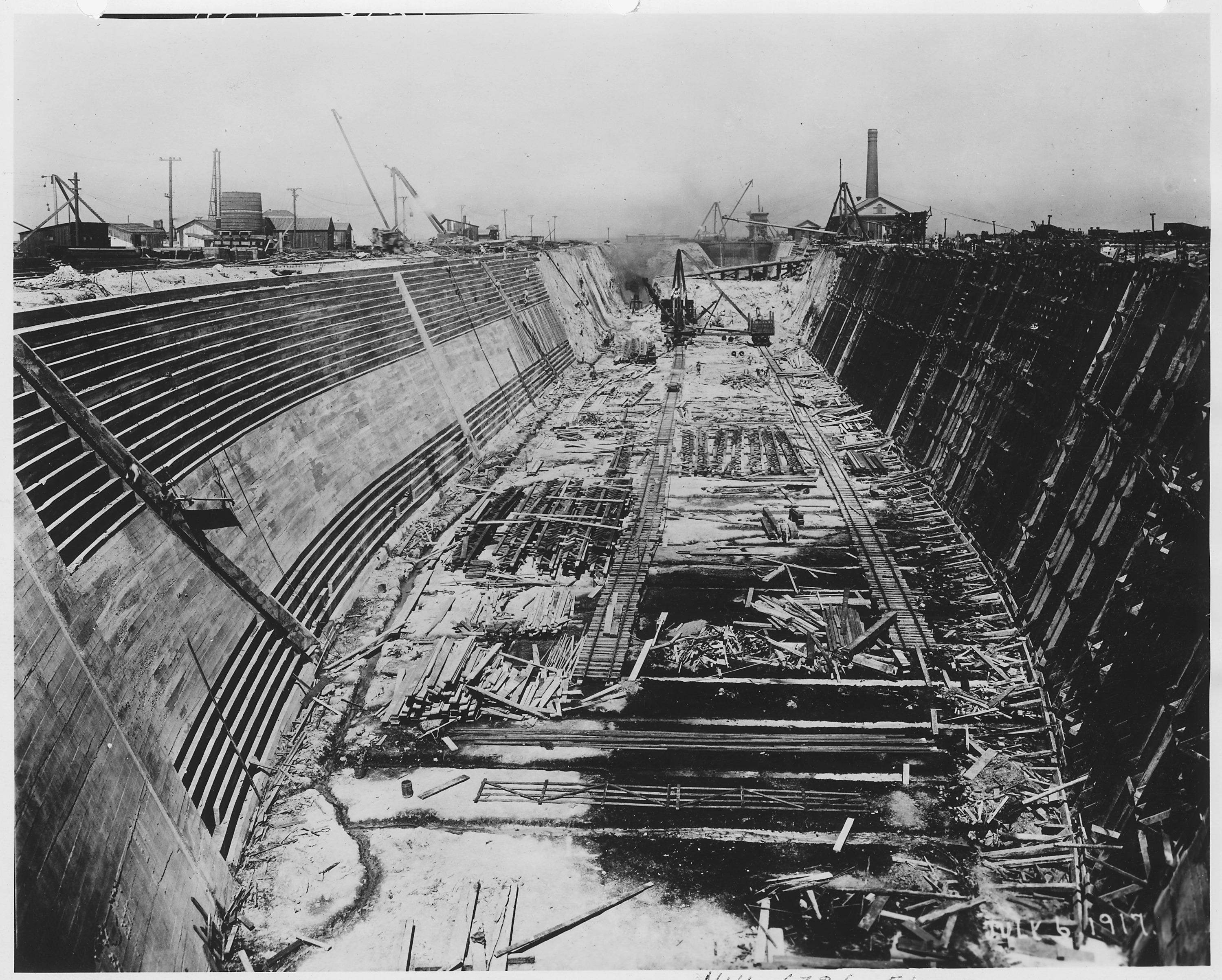
Dry dock construction, around 1917

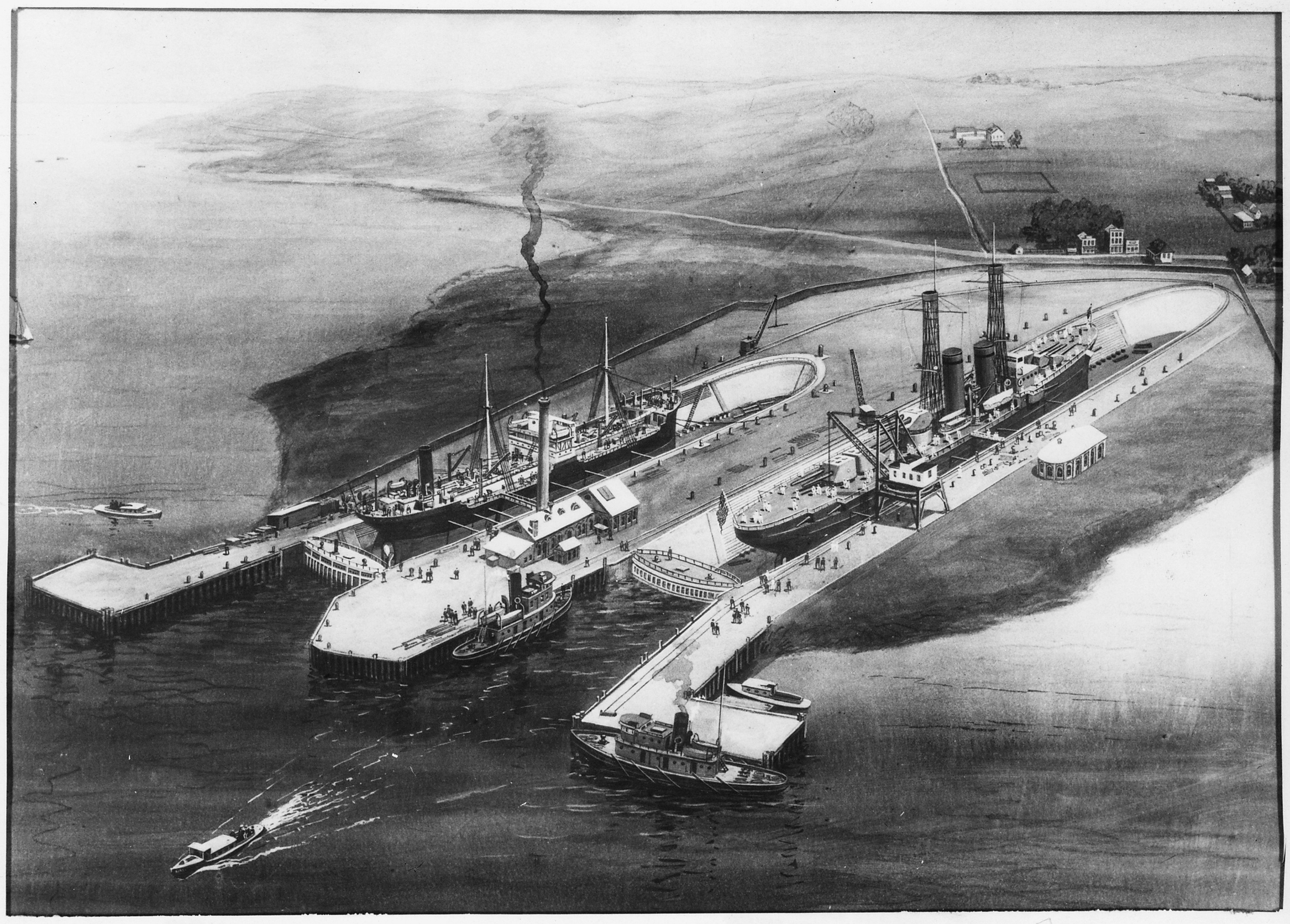
"Artist's Conception of Proposed Improvements for Hunters' Point when acquired by Bethlehem Shipbuilding Corp. LTD." circa 1910

The original docks were built on solid rock. In 1916 the drydocks were thought to be the largest in the world. At over 1,000 feet in length, they were said to be big enough to accommodate the world's largest warships and passenger steamers. Soundings showed an offshore depth of 65 feet. During the early 20th century much of the Hunters Point shoreline was extended by landfill extensions into the San Francisco Bay.

Between World War I and the beginning of World War II the Navy contracted with the private owners for the use of the docks. The docks provided deep-water facilities between San Diego and Bremerton, Washington. The main naval base in the area was at Mare Island Naval Shipyard, but silting in the area made it only suitable for shallow-draft ships. A Congressional hearing on Pacific Coast Naval Bases was held in San Francisco in 1920 at San Francisco City Hall, wherein city representatives, Mayor Rolph, City Engineer O'Shaughnessy and others testified on behalf of permanently siting the Navy at Hunters Point.

=== Navy purchase ===
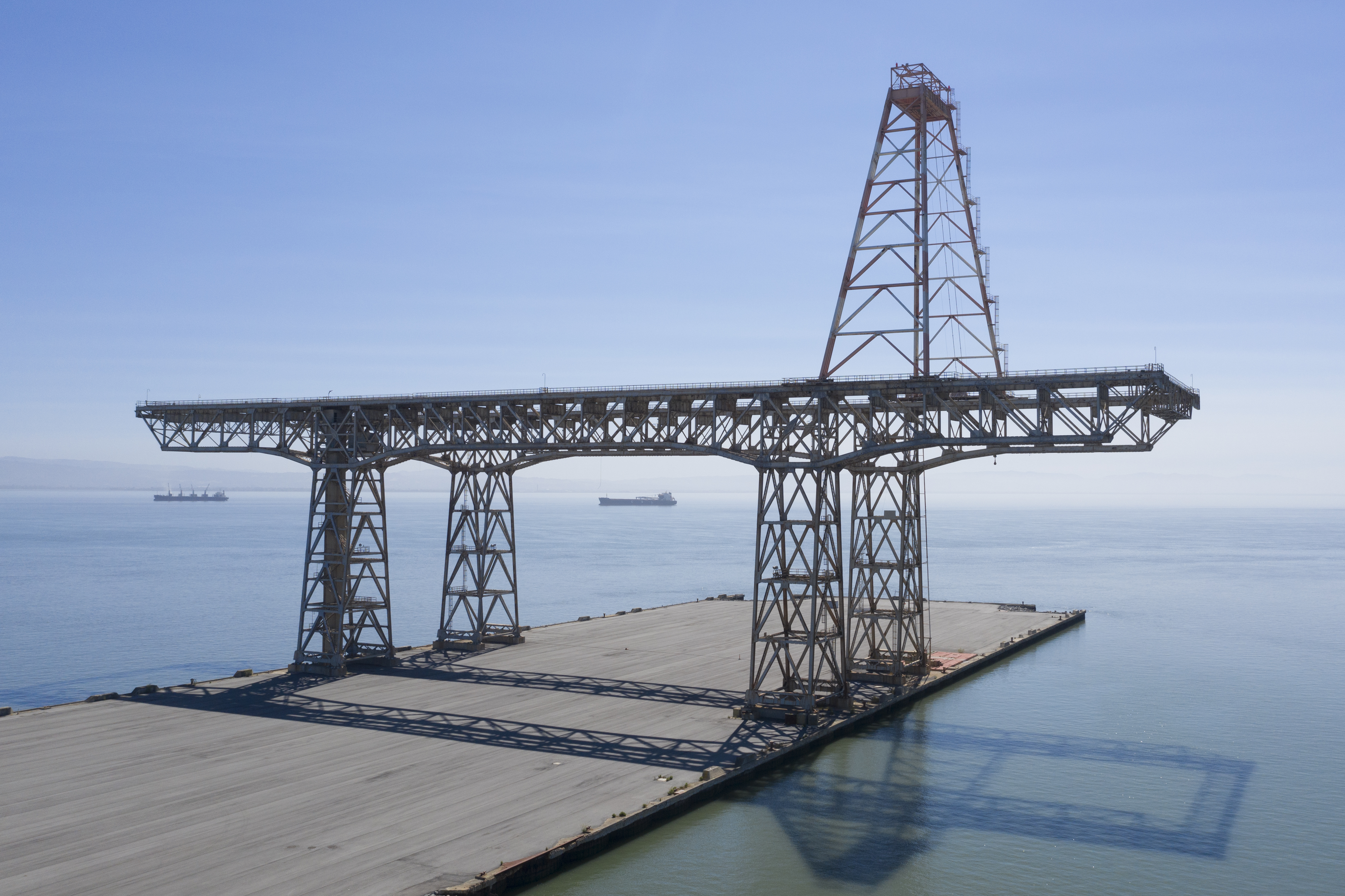
The battleship crane in 2020

At the start of WWII the Navy recognized the need for greatly increased naval shipbuilding and repair facilities in the San Francisco Bay Area, and in 1940 acquired the property from the private owners, naming it Hunters Point Naval Shipyard. A bill that would have set aside $6 million for the purchase of the Hunters Point property from Bethlehem Steel was deferred in March 1939. The property became one of the major shipyards of the west coast. It was later renamed Treasure Island Naval Station Hunters Point Annex. During the 1940s, many workers moved into the area to work at this shipyard and other wartime related industries.

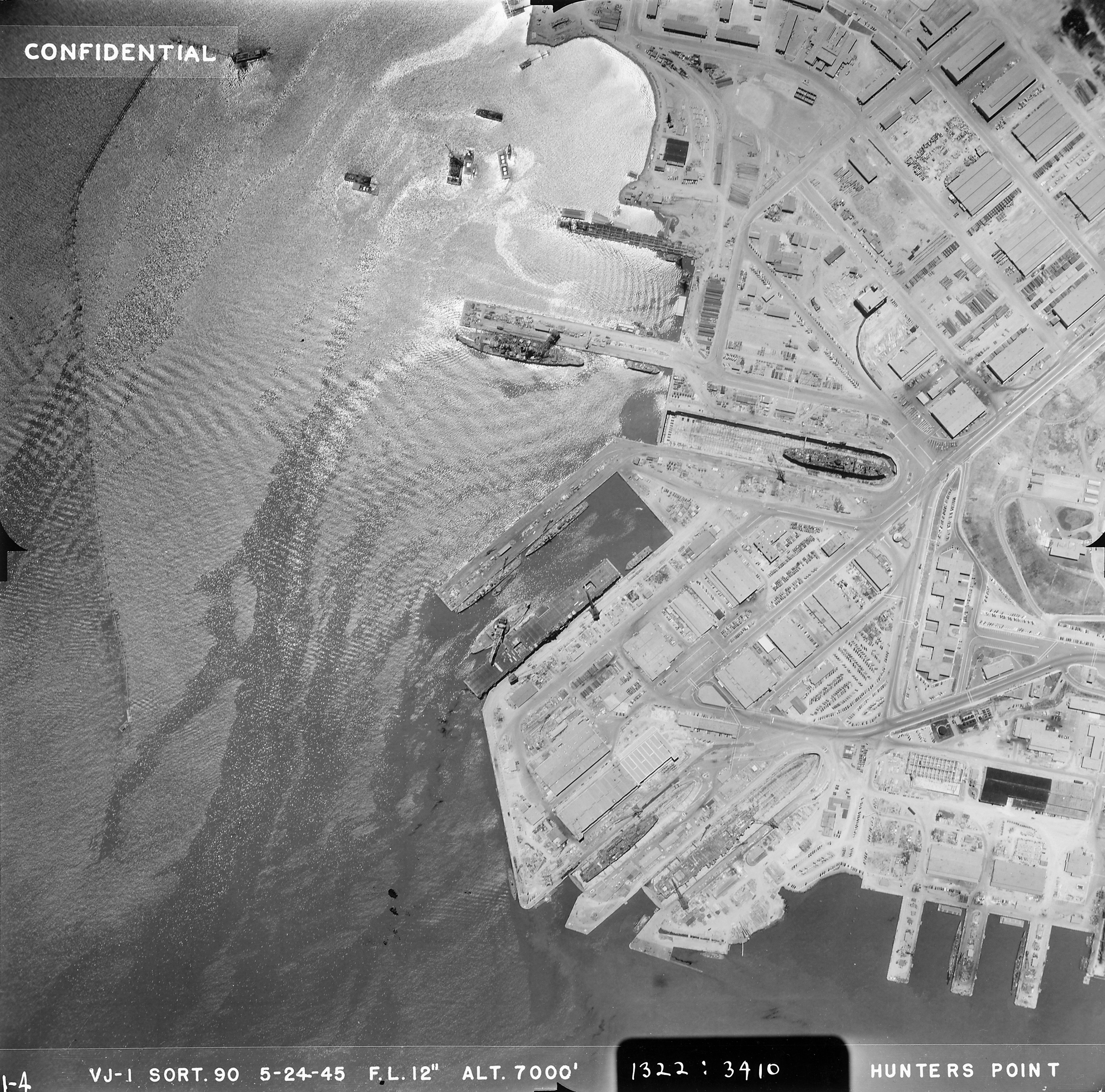
Aerial photograph taken on 24 May 1945.

The key fissile components of the first atomic bomb were loaded onto USS Indianapolis in July 1945 at Hunters Point for transfer to Tinian. After World War II and until 1969, the Hunters Point shipyard was the site of the Naval Radiological Defense Laboratory, the US military's largest facility for applied nuclear research. The yard was used after the war to decontaminate ships from Operation Crossroads. Because of all the testing, there is widespread radiological contamination of the site. After the war, with an influx of blue collar industry, the area remained a naval base and commercial shipyard.

In 1947 the Hunter's Point crane completed construction at the site by the American Bridge Company. It was the largest crane in the world, and was intended to be used to remove the turrets of battleships so the guns could be quickly replaced while the old set was being refurbished on land. The Hunter's Point crane succeeded YD-171, better known as Herman the German, as the largest crane in America.

In 1959 the gantry crane was the site of Operation Skycatch, where dummy Polaris missiles were fired and caught via a string of arresting cables, before being lowered to the ground for testing. Previous versions of the test had the missiles flung out into the bay and retrieved from the ocean floor.

A large trapezoidal frame was erected atop the gantry crane for the UGM-73 Poseidon missile test facility; the structural members were lifted by Marine Boss in 1967. The addition of the frame brought the total height of the crane to nearly 500 feet (150 m). The crane dominates the landscape in the area, as it is easily visible from miles around.

=== Pacific Reserve Fleet, Hunters Point ===
Pacific Reserve Fleet, Hunters Point, also called Pacific Reserve Fleet, Hunters Point Group, was a United States Navy reserve fleet at the Hunters Point Naval Shipyard. The mothball fleet of World War II ships was next to the Hunters Point Naval Shipyard. Some ships there were reactivated for the Korean War and Vietnam War.

=== Navy closure ===
The Navy operated the yard as a repair facility until 1974, when it leased most of it to a commercial ship repair company, who used it until 1986. A copy of the planned closure list was obtained by the Associated Press in 1973. The Hunters Point Shipyard was reactivated briefly between 1986 and 1989 as an annex to Naval Station Treasure Island.

The Hunters Point Shipyard Artists (HPSA), formerly "the Point", is a community of artists who rent studios in the former U.S. naval shipyard on Hunters Point in the Bayview community of San Francisco. An artist community since 1983, founded by Jacques Terzian the Hunters Point Shipyard is now home to more than 250 artists.

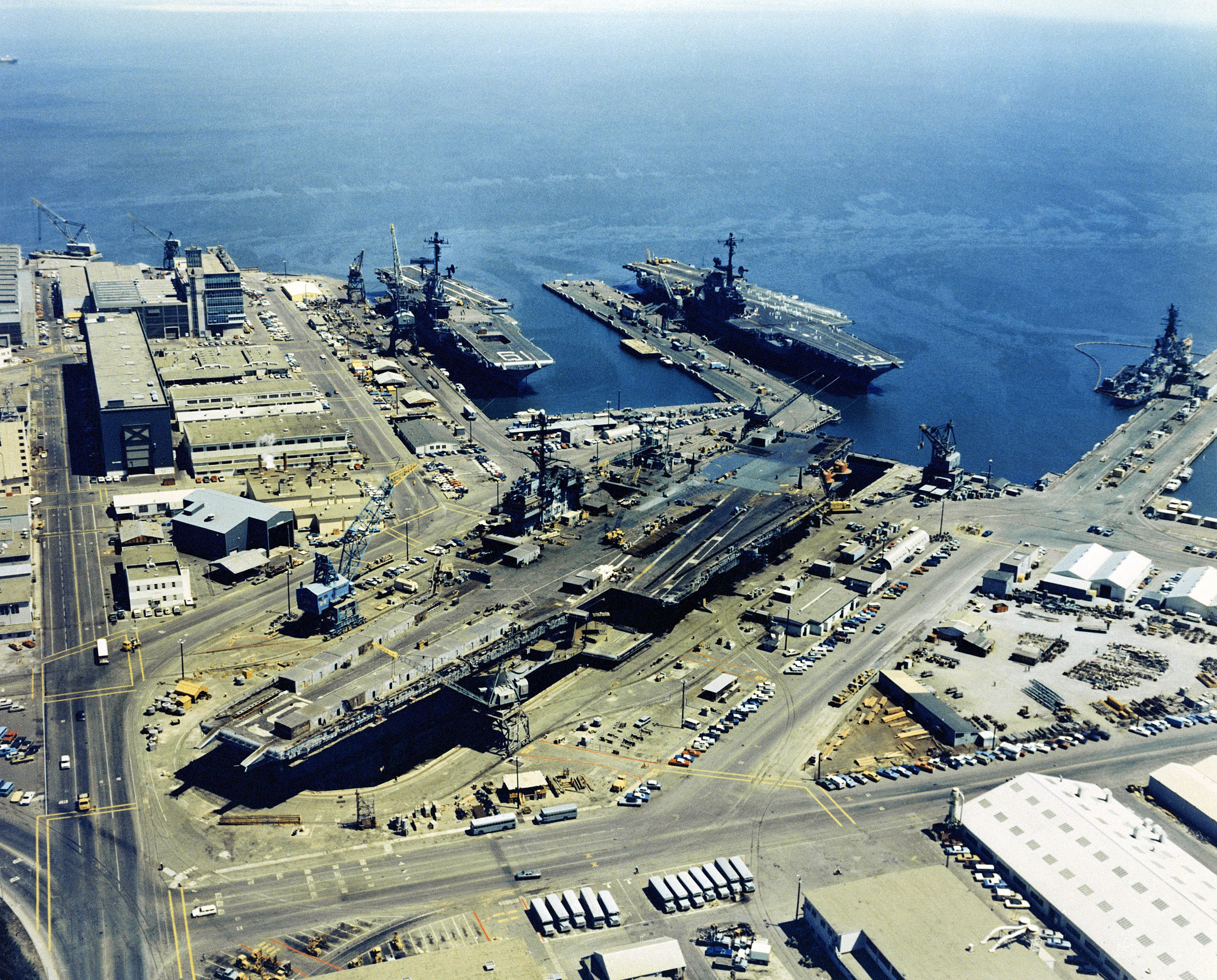
1971: carriers Ranger, Hancock, and Coral Sea at Hunters' Point.

In 1987, the Navy considered reopening the shipyard as the home port for the newly reactivated USS Missouri (BB-63), which would move from Long Beach. Rear Admiral Robert L. Toney and Mayor Dianne Feinstein signed an agreement that committed San Francisco to spend up to $1 million per year to maintain the infrastructure, including dredging and traffic improvements. After Feinstein was succeeded as mayor by Art Agnos, Agnos declared his opposition to the new home port, stating the costs would outweigh potential benefits. A referendum was held on the issue in the November 1988 general election. One proposition offered support for the Navy's plan, and another proposition, sponsored by Agnos, stated the infrastructure costs would be borne by the Navy, and 351 new civilian jobs were required to be created. Despite the passage of the proposition supporting the Navy's plan, the Base Realignment and Closure Commission (BRAC) recommended building the base for Missouri at Long Beach, San Diego, or Pearl Harbor. In 1989, the base was declared a Superfund site requiring long-term clean-up.

=== BRAC, remediation of environmental contamination, 1994 ===
in 1994, the Navy closed the shipyard and base as part of the next round of Base Realignment and Closure recommendations. Besides radioactive contamination, Hunter's Point had a succession of coal- and oil-fired power generation facilities which left a legacy of pollution, both from smokestack effluvium and leftover byproducts that were dumped in the vicinity. The BRAC program has managed the majority of the site's numerous pollution remediation projects.

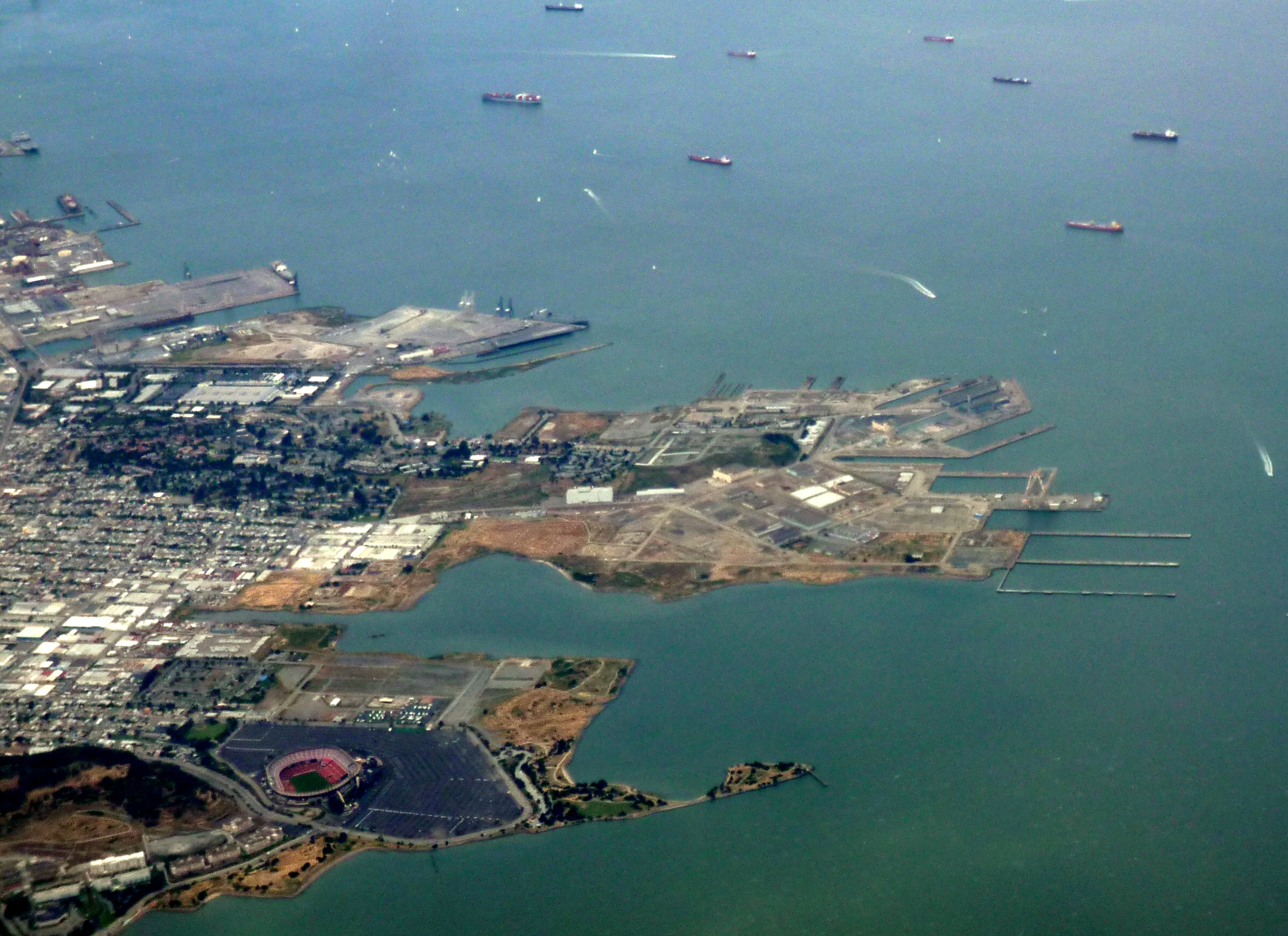
Aerial view in May 2010

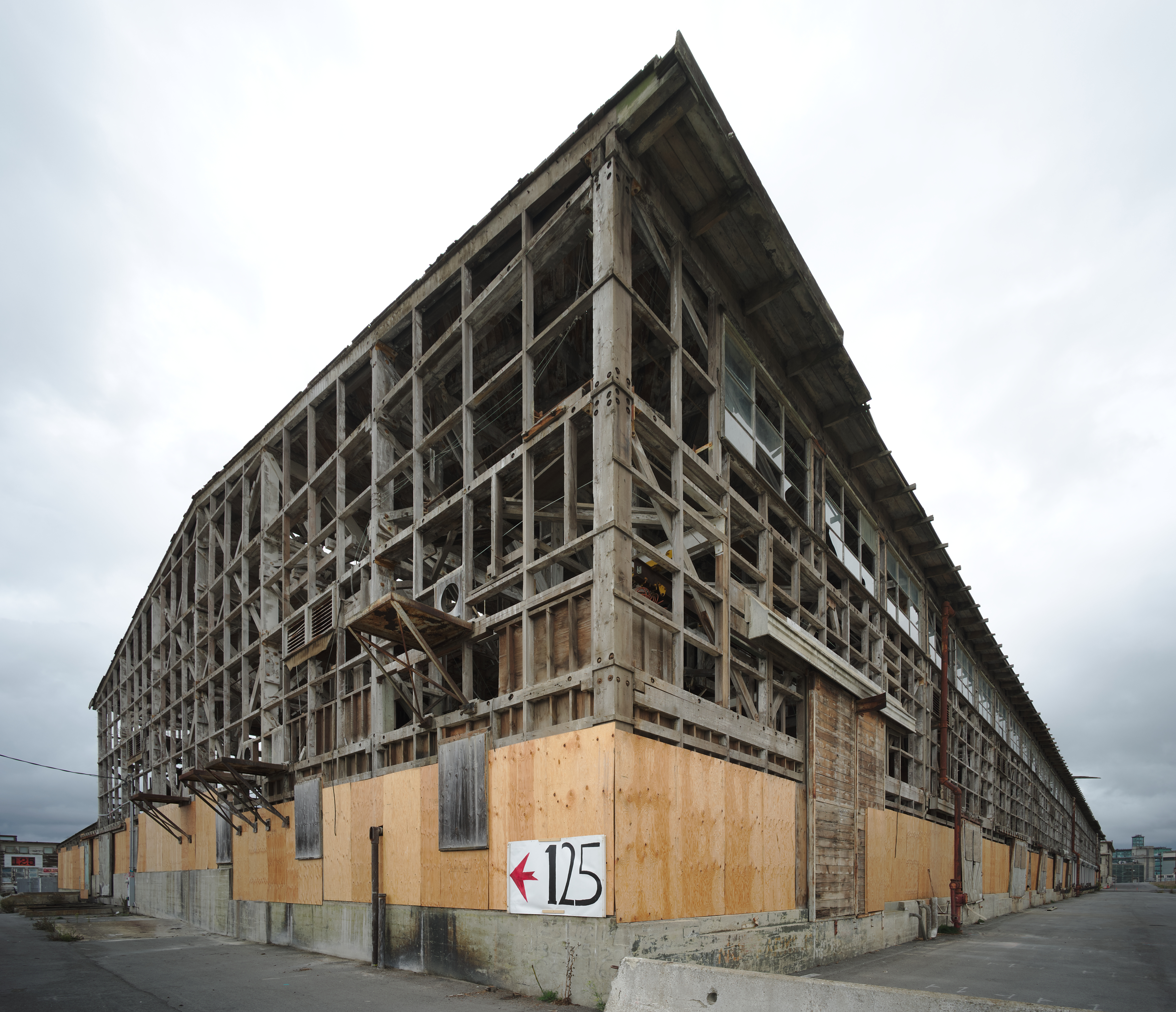
Abandoned building in October 2016

=== Shipyard redevelopment ===
As of August 2020, the former shipyard site is still being decontaminated, and has been split into multiple parcels to allow the Navy to declare them clean and safe for redevelopment separately. While Lennar has built and sold hundreds of new condominium units on the property, regulators, activists, and cleanup workers have claimed that the site is still heavily contaminated and that Tetra Tech, the company contracted to handle the cleanup and testing, has repeatedly violated established cleanup protocols, deliberately falsified radiation test results at the site to falsely show that there is little remaining radiation, and fired employees who attempted to force workers to perform radiation tests as required. According to an article published in 2017, the Navy stated that at least 386 out of the 25,000+ soil samples that have been collected over the past two decades were identified as "anomalous." New homes built on the property were set to be available to tenants in the winter of 2014/2015. The first residents began moving into homes in June 2015.

In September 2016, the United States Environmental Protection Agency (EPA) halted the transfer of additional land at Hunters Point from the Navy to the city and to real estate developers. Per a letter sent from the EPA to the Navy, the process was placed on hold until "the actual potential public exposure to radioactive material at and near" the shipyard can be "clarified."

=== Proposition P, 2000 ===
In 2000, San Francisco voters passed Proposition P in a landslide, with 86% voting "yes". The proposition stated that the Navy would be responsible for cleaning up the shipyard to the highest standard. The year after the proposition passed, the San Francisco Board of Supervisors passed, and the mayor signed, a resolution titled "Adoption of Proposition P as Official City Policy for the Environmental Remediation of Hunters Point Shipyard." The resolution made it clear that it was the city's policy that Hunters Point "be cleaned to a level which would enable the unrestricted use of the property - the highest standard for cleanup established by the United States Environmental Protection Agency." The Navy modified its Record of Decision (ROD) for Parcel B of Hunters Point Shipyard, which weakened the cleanup standards for the parcel. Despite this, the Navy still found contamination levels higher than its cleanup standards, and in 2009 moved to rework its entire cleanup strategy for the parcel. The Navy once again amended the ROD for Parcel B, this time to change its remediation strategy from removing all contaminated soils from the parcel to installing covers in the soil as a means of suppressing the contamination. By abandoning its commitment to pursue a remediation effort based on cleanup, the Navy also abandoned its commitment to clean up Hunters Point to unrestricted residential release standards.

In Parcel G the Navy followed a similar pattern of disregarding Proposition P, and therefore San Francisco city policy, by lowering cleanup standards and shifting the future land use of the area. The 2009 ROD for Parcel G outlined its future use as mostly industrial, and therefore required lower cleanup standards than a parcel set for residential use. In 2017, the Navy released an Explanation of Significant Differences for the Parcel G ROD which stated that the parcel would be zoned largely for residential use. This shift occurred without tightening the cleanup standards to a residential level; the Navy instead put "action levels" in place, which are still lower than the criteria for residential use. In Parcel C and Parcel E the Navy bypassed its commitment to a full cleanup as outlined by Proposition P, relying instead on soil covers and 'institutional controls'. Under the National Contingency Plan (NCP), which is the central regulating process for governing Superfund sites, community acceptance is one of the nine criteria for establishing cleanup requirements. The text of Proposition P and the Board of Supervisors resolution adopting it as city policy references the NCP and the community acceptance provision. The proposition and the resolution both make clear that the community is committed to the highest level of cleanup. Thus, the Navy, by refusing to establish cleanup standards that allow for unrestricted residential use, is violating federal Superfund law under CERCLA and putting future residents of Hunters Point at risk.

=== Attempts to reinstate the RAB, 2020 ===
In 2020, the Navy BRAC decision not to reestablish the Restoration Advisory Board was based on a limited survey return of 40 respondents, which did not match the response of more than 200 petitioners who signed the community-led initiative to reestablish the RAB. Biomonitoring funded by the Lucile Packard Foundation for Children's Health detected thallium and manganese in high frequency among shipyard workers and residents.

== Dry docks ==
No.	Construction	Length	Width	Depth	Completed	Source
2	Concrete	743 feet 5 inches (226.59 m)	122 feet (37 m)	28 feet 10 inches (8.79 m)	1903	
3	Concrete	1,005 feet 4 inches (306.43 m)	153 feet (47 m)	39 feet 10 inches (12.14 m)	1919	
4	Concrete	1,092 feet (333 m)	171 feet (52 m)	50 feet 5 inches (15.37 m)	1942	
5	Concrete	420 feet (130 m)	66 feet (20 m)	27 feet (8.2 m)	1944	
6	Concrete	420 feet (130 m)	81 feet (25 m)	27 feet (8.2 m)	1944	
7	Concrete	420 feet (130 m)	66 feet (20 m)	27 feet (8.2 m)	1944	

== See also ==
- Rosie the Riveter/World War II Home Front National Historical Park
