= Frederick Griffing's (ship) =

- U.S. National Register of Historic Places
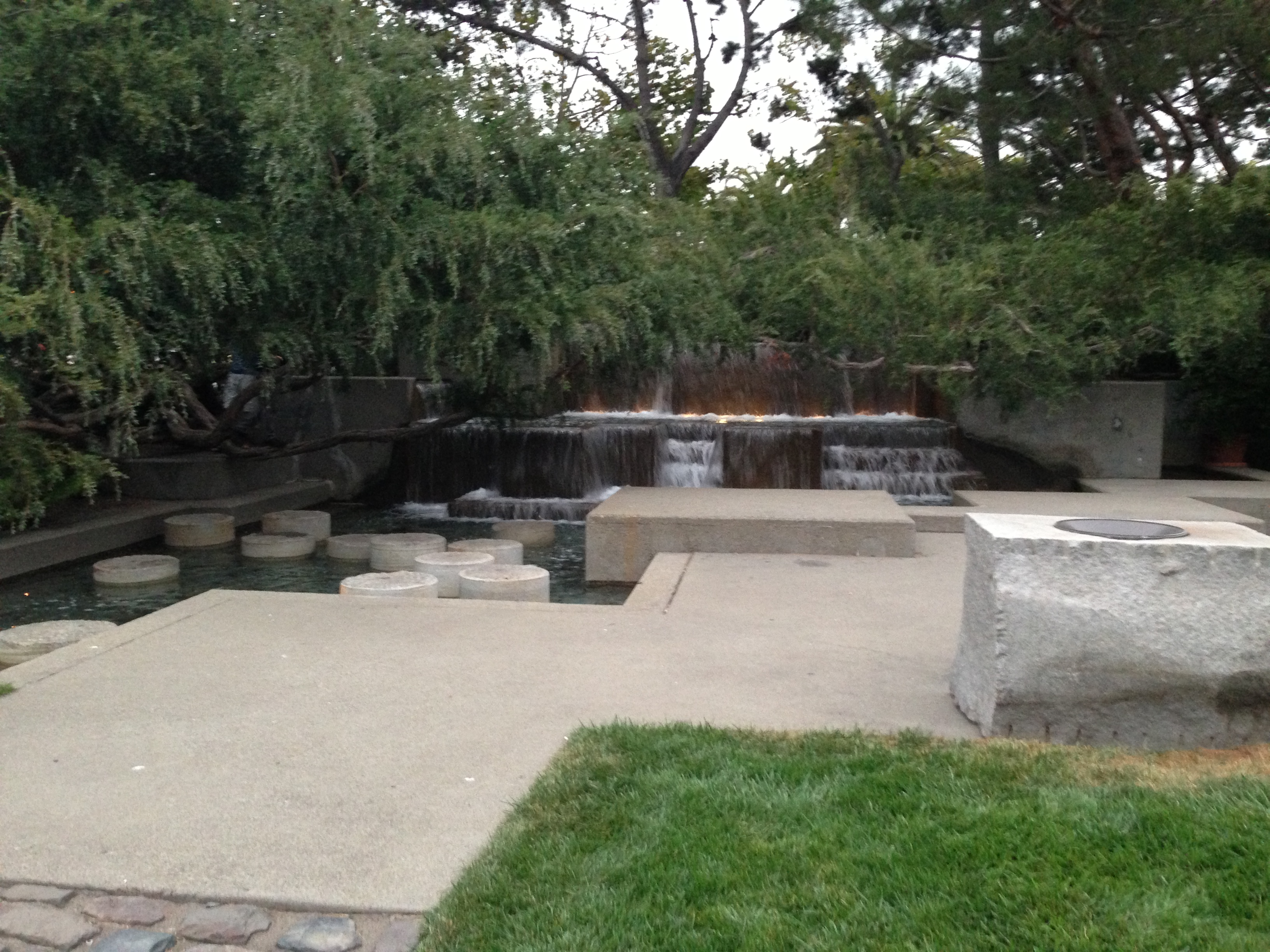
- Site of buried ship

- Location within San Francisco County Location within California Location within the United States
- Nearest city: Levi Plaza, San Francisco, California
- Coordinates: 37.803°N 122.4021°W
- Area: 0.1 acres (0.040 ha)
- Built: 1852
- NRHP reference No.: 82002248
- Added to NRHP: February 1, 1982

Frederick Griffing's ship refers to the remains of a sailing vessel buried beneath the current Levi's Plaza in San Francisco, where Frederick Griffing's wharf previously existed. When the plaza was constructed in 1978, the archaeological site was discovered. The ship is believed to be either the Palmyra or the William Grey.
