= Off the Grid (food organization) =

Mobile food truck festival in California

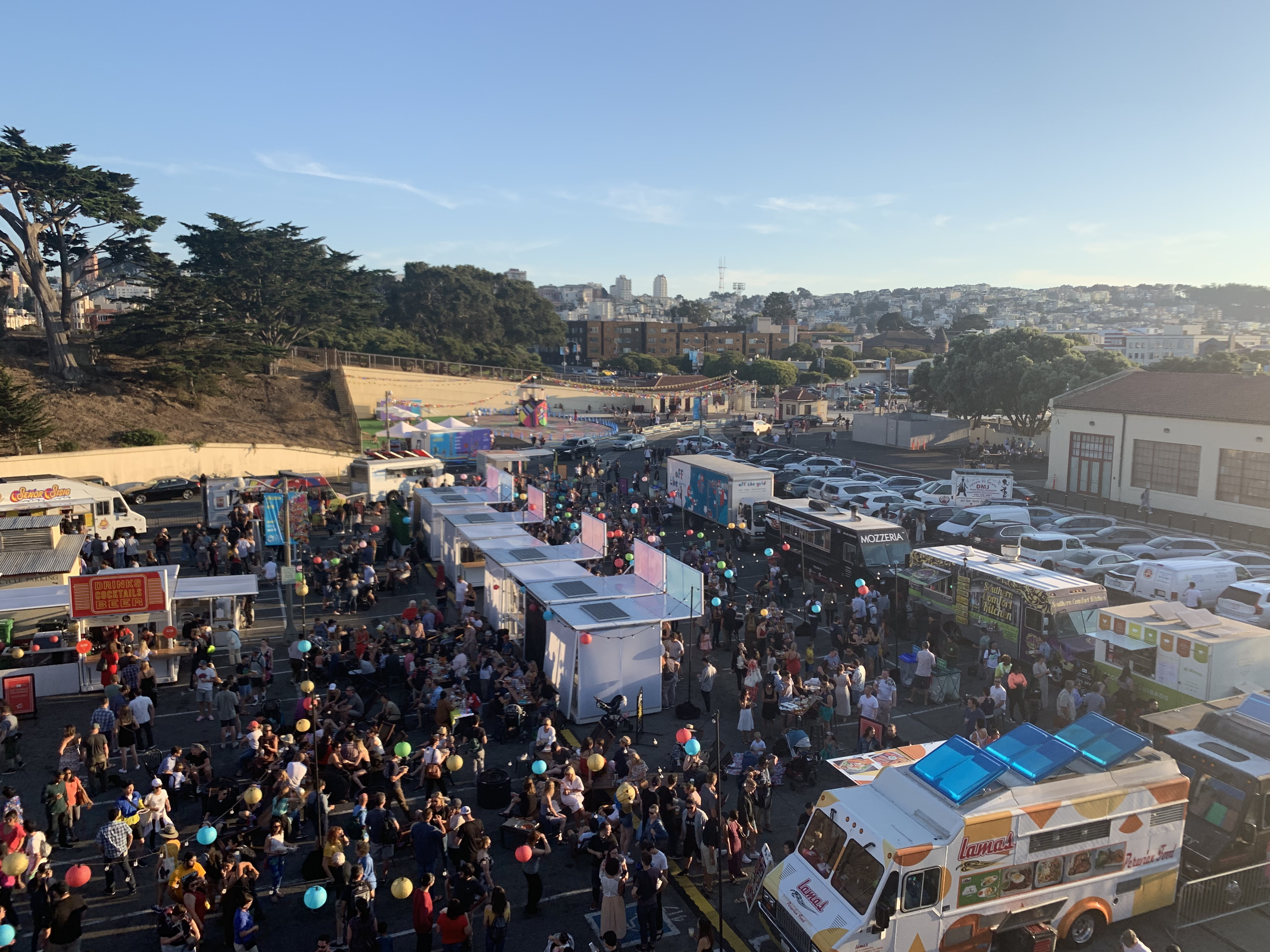
Off the Grid's flagship market in San Francisco

Off the Grid is a mobile food and events platform in the San Francisco Bay Area of California, USA. The platform is known for galvanizing the San Francisco food truck scene in 2010, Off the Grid activates public and private space via temporary food experiences that include public markets, catering events and employee dining services.

== Overview ==
Off the Grid is best known for their public markets experiences that feed hundreds of people weekly. Similar to a night market or a bazaar, a group of vendors gather in an outdoor space on certain days of the week. Originally based in San Francisco, California, Off the Grid now extends its markets throughout the Bay Area.

Off the Grid is owned and operated by Matt Cohen who got the idea of a mobile food feast while teaching in Japan. There he saw street vendors drive around and serve food cooked from fire pits in the back of their motor vehicles. Off the Grid's first event was on June 25, 2010 at Fort Mason Center in San Francisco. It had live music, alcohol, and vendors serving Latin and Asian food. In 2010 a total of three markets were opened. In 2011 Off the Grid opened nine more, and today there are 15 total markets that run weekly. More than 200 different vendors participate in Off the Grid.

Off the Grid offers a variety of food at each market, and it changes the combination of vendors so that each event is unique. The vendors that take part in the Off the Grid markets have come to serve a broad range of international foods, including American, South American, Taiwanese, Indian, Japanese, Mexican, and Mediterranean fare. Expanding on the popularity of their public events, Off the Grid's services now include large-scale event catering and corporate dining solutions
