= Alison Collins =

American politician (born 1969/1970)

Vice President of the San Francisco Board of Education
- In office January 13, 2021 – March 25, 2021
- Preceded by: Gabriela López
- Succeeded by: Faauuga Moliga

San Francisco Board of Education Commissioner
- In office January 8, 2019 – March 11, 2022

Personal details
- Spouse: Chris Collins
- Occupation: Former politician; real estate consultant
- Website: alimcollins.com

Alison M. Collins (born 1969/1970) is a former commissioner of the San Francisco Board of Education. She served on the board from January 7, 2019 until her recall election of February 15, 2022, when she was ousted by 76% of the vote, the largest of all three commissioners recalled on that date. Along with two other commissioners, Collins became the first member of the school board to be recalled in the history of San Francisco, and the first recalled San Francisco official in over a century, since the ouster of State Senator Edwin Grant in 1914.

During her tenure, Collins received national attention for changing the merit-based admission policy at Lowell High School — arguing that merit-based admission is racist — and accusations of engaging in racism herself for a series of tweets she wrote in 2016 targeting Asian Americans. The statements led to Collins being stripped of her title as vice president of the Board on March 25, 2021. In response she filed an $87-million lawsuit against the San Francisco Unified School District and San Francisco Board of Education on March 31, 2021, which was subsequently dismissed by a federal judge due to lack of merit.

Collins also attracted attention for her role in other controversial decisions made by the board, including the attempted destruction of the Life of Washington mural, the attempted renaming of 44 schools, and the refusal to hire a consultant to reopen the schools during the COVID-19 pandemic. These actions resulted in successful lawsuits by alumni groups, and a lawsuit by the city itself.

== Early life ==
According to Collins' San Francisco Unified School District biography, she holds a master's degree in education from San Francisco State University. According to biographies at the websites of San Francisco Unified School District and other sources, Collins' father was one of the first African American professors at UCLA. She has stated that her parents attended public schools and she is a mixed race person. As of January 2022, she was 52 years old.

== Activism and bullying accusations ==
Collins was an educator for 20 years prior to 2018 and ran the "San Francisco Public School Mom" blog. She is a critic of charter schools and claims merit-based systems are racist; although Collins's own children attend Ruth Asawa School of the Arts, the only remaining merit-based high school in San Francisco.

In 2016, Collins complained about incidents of bullying and racism at Francisco Middle School, where Collins' daughter once attended. The contract of that school's principal, Patricia Theel, was subsequently not renewed. In a tweet from 2017, Collins appeared to claim responsibility for the firing. Theel and two other employees of San Francisco Unified School District accused Collins of bullying behavior and creating a toxic atmosphere at schools which Collins's daughter then attended.

== San Francisco Board of Education ==
Collins was elected to the board of education in 2018, among a pool of 19 candidates. During her tenure she came into national attention for a string of controversies, which were sometimes covered by international press as well.

=== School board controversies ===
In 2019, Collins voted with the rest of the board to destroy the Life of Washington mural by Viktor Arnautoff in George Washington High School, which had been contentious due to its depiction of slavery and Native Americans. After a national outcry, the board decided in a 4 to 3 vote, with Collins (together with Mark Sanchez and Gabriela Lopez) in the minority, to cover the art work instead. In response to preservationists, Collins stated that the "mural is not historic. It is a relic. It is a remnant from a bygone era. You don't get to tell us to keep them. If you want them, come get them." She also said, "One of the earmarks of white supremacy culture is valuing [white] property over [black and brown] ppl."

Work by Collins and others on the board to rename 44 schools named after individuals and places associated allegedly with racism or oppression was the focus of substantial controversy, particularly after board members disclosed that research into the naming origins was done by "volunteers" who had no historical expertise or training, and ultimately legal action. The list included all presidents sculpted on Mount Rushmore, and California senator Dianne Feinstein. Collins stated that the intent was not to erase history, but to "create space for new people who deserve to be celebrated .... Nobody is going to not know who George Washington is. Nobody is going to not know who Lincoln is."

Collins voted with the 5-2 majority in February 2021 to turn the merit-based admissions policy at Lowell High School into a lottery system, calling the former system "racist". She stated that "merit, meritocracy and especially meritocracy based on standardized testing...those are racist systems" and are the "antithesis of fair". Critics pointed out that Collins' own children attend Ruth Asawa School of the Arts, which is the only remaining merit-based high school in San Francisco. Writing for Newsweek, Angel Eduardo opined that calling merit "racist" erases people of color by reducing them to a quota.

Collins and other school board members were criticized by Mayor London Breed and others for failure to reopen schools during the pandemic. In 2020, the district attempted to hire a reopening consultant but was blocked by the board, with Collins comparing the consulting firm to a "crime syndicate" due to its association with charter schools. She also stated that hiring the consultant would amount to "perpetuating white supremacy".

During its meeting on February 9, 2021, the school board questioned whether a gay teacher, who was the father of a biracial child, would add diversity to an all female parental advisory committee of volunteers, on the ground that he was white and would temporarily tip the racial balance of the committee. Collins was "adamant" that he should not be appointed, although 5 of the 15 positions were vacant at the time, to which no one else had applied. The board discussed the issue for two hours, despite other pressing issues such as school reopening, before rejecting the candidate.

=== Racist tweets ===
Prior to her election to the San Francisco Board of Education in 2018, Collins used a racial slur to reference Asian Americans in her tweets on December 4, 2016, referring to them as "house n****r [sic]", and "the help", after alleging anti-Blackness in the Asian American population at her daughter's school, and accusing Asian American teachers and students in the San Francisco Unified School District of perpetuating the model minority myth by assimilating and not engaging in critical race theory dialogue. Over the course of several tweets on December 4, 2016, Collins wrote:

Many Asian [students] and [teachers] I know won't engage in critical race convos unless they see how they're impacted by white supremacy. ... Many Asian Am. believe they benefit from the "model minority" BS. In fact many Asian American [teachers], [students] and [parents] actively promote these myths. They use white supremacist thinking to assimilate and "get ahead". Talk to many [Lowell High School] parents and you will hear praise of Tiger Moms and disparagement of Black/Brown "culture". I even see it in my [Facebook] timeline with former [high school] peers. Their [timelines] are full of White Asian ppl. No recognition Black Lives Matter exists. 2 [weeks] ago, my mixed-race/Black daughter heard boys teasing a Latino about "Trump, Mexicans and the KKK." The boys were Asian-American. She spoke up when none of the other staff did. The after school counselor was Asian. Where are the vocal Asians speaking up against Trump? Don't Asian Americans know they're on his list as well? Do they think they won't be deported? profiled? beaten? Being a house n****r [sic] is still being a n****r. You're still considered "the help."

On March 19, 2021, members of the recall effort against Collins resurfaced the tweets amidst a surge in violent crimes against Asians.

By March 21, 2021, nearly two dozen elected officials had condemned the tweets and called for her resignation, including Mayor of San Francisco London Breed, 10 out of 11 current San Francisco Board of Supervisors and several former supervisors, California State Assembly members David Chiu and Phil Ting, California State Senator Scott Wiener, and fellow commissioners, Jenny Lam and Faauuga Moliga. This also included several San Francisco political groups. Joe Eskenazi of Mission Local said, "The solidarity among San Francisco's political class in calling for school board vice president Alison Collins to resign is stunning in its damn-near unanimity."

On March 22, 2021, the district's Superintendent Leadership team condemned Collins' "racist and hurtful language."

At the regular Board meeting on March 23, 2021, Collins apologized for the tweets but did not mention the Asian American community in the apology. Collins refused to resign, maintained that the tweets were taken out of context, and did not delete the tweets. On March 25, 2021, Commissioners Jenny Lam and Faauuga Moliga introduced a motion of no confidence against Collins. The board approved the resolution 5-2 (with Collins and Commissioner Gabriela Lopez voting against), relieving Collins of her titles including Vice-President and roles in any committees.

In November 2021, Collins expressed regret that her words caused hurt to the Asian American community. Collins maintained that her tweets were not racist and that her words were weaponized by opponents with ulterior motives. Collins said, "If we're going to talk about what I said, we should be looking at who surfaced what I said and what were their motivations in sharing old tweets about during a time when Asian Americans were going through a lot of fear and pain."

=== Lawsuit against the school board ===
On March 31, 2021, Collins filed an $87-million lawsuit against the San Francisco Unified School District and the 5 board members who had voted for the motion of no-confidence due to her tweets against Asian Americans. The lawsuit alleged that the vote violated her due process, freedom of speech, and caused distress, humiliation, and losses in income and reputation. The lawsuit sought an injunction to reinstate her previous roles within the Board.

On April 4, 2021, her lawyer Charles Bonner, said the lawsuit aimed to end what he called lies about the tweets, noting similarities to words used by Malcolm X about bringing together all of those oppressed by racism, “[s]he was saying, ‘Listen, we all got to coalesce, we’ve got to unify, we’ve got to hold hands and recognize our commonality.’ So she called everyone to action."

Various legal scholars expressed skepticism about the viability of the suit. UC Berkeley Law Dean Erwin Chemerinsky said that California school districts are classified "as agents of the state and thus exempt from damages in civil rights cases." Harvard Law professor Laurence Tribe agreed that the suit is likely to be dismissed, saying that, “Courts have more important things to do than provide a stage for the resolution of essentially interpersonal political feuds, especially when the stakes involve the education of children who obviously cannot fend for themselves.” A similar 2010 lawsuit, Blair vs. Bethel School District, lost at every level including the United States Court of Appeals for the Ninth Circuit.

On August 16, 2021, a federal judge decided that the lawsuit claims had no merit and dismissed the lawsuit. Subsequently, Collins dropped the lawsuit, and stated that "I'm choosing to focus on our schools." Defending against the lawsuit cost the school district over $110,000 in legal fees. In November 2021, Collins said she does not regret filing the lawsuit because "it reaffirmed my presence on the board. And it also protected my family."

=== Recall election ===
On February 21, 2021, a campaign committee was formed to recall Collins, and two other commissioners from the Board of Education. On September 7, 2021 the campaign submitted 81,200 signatures to remove Collins. On October 18, 2021, city officials announced that at least 51,325 of the signatures had been verified, enough to trigger a recall election which was scheduled for February 15, 2022. It was the first San Francisco recall election since the failed attempt to oust then Mayor Dianne Feinstein in 1983

Supporters of the recall accused Collins of negligence, expressing anger that public school remained closed in 2020-2021 while other districts and private schools opened in the Bay Area. They also accused Collins of misplaced priorities focusing on school renaming and Lowell High School admissions as students were struggling with distance learning. The recall supporters cited Collins's tweets about Asian Americans, and the subsequent lawsuit against the school district and her fellow commissioners, as additional reasons to remove her from office.

Local politicians and public officials supporting the recall of Collins included Mayor London Breed, State Senator Scott Wiener, chief public defender and former president of the Board of Supervisors Matt Gonzalez, California State Treasurer Fiona Ma, supervisor Matt Haney, supervisor Rafael Mandelman, supervisor Hillary Ronan, former supervisor David Campos, former chair of California Democratic Party John Burton, and former Mayor Art Agnos. Local publications San Francisco Chronicle, San Francisco Examiner, and Bay Area Reporter also endorsed the recall.

Collins called the recall campaign "a move toward mayoral control and less local control … for parents who are immigrants who can vote". She called the recall campaign "politically motivated" and stated that “When I see certain people getting upset, I know I’m doing the right thing". She said the recall is "clearly an attack on democracies" orchestrated by "billionaires" and conservative think tanks, and "I'm actually really proud of my work on the board", she stated.

Recall critics called the election a waste of money and time when voters could vote on Collins's re-election nine months later in November 2022, and some opposed recalls in general. Recall opponents included former Assembly Member Tom Ammiano and Supervisors Shamann Walton and Dean Preston. The teachers' union, United Educators of San Francisco, also opposed the recall.

On February 15, 2022, Collins was ousted from office by 76% of the vote. The other two commissioners on the ballot, Gabriela Lopez and Faauuga Moliga were also ousted with 72% and 69% of the vote respectively. These three commissioners became the first members of the school board to be recalled in the history of San Francisco. It was the first successful San Francisco recall since the ouster of State Senator Edwin Grant in 1914. The turn out for the election was 36% of the electorate. More people voted to oust the commissioners than had voted for them in 2018. A majority of voters in every neighborhood in San Francisco supported the removal of Collins.

== Personal life ==
Collins is married to real estate developer Chris Collins, a principal at Urban Pacific Development, LLC. Alison Collins owns a consulting company, Falcon Pacific LLC, which receives income from Urban Pacific. The couple lives in Russian Hill neighborhood of San Francisco with their daughters.

=== Illegal building merger ===
In April 2021, the San Francisco Planning Department received an anonymous 103-page complaint against Collins and her husband for illegally merging two apartments in their Russian Hill home without a permit. An inspection by the city found that the complaint was valid and that the couple had also violated several other building permit laws.

City records show that in 2018 a contractor had complained about the Collins's "refusal to let [the Department of Building Inspection] inspect the interior of the house." On September 14, 2021, the San Francisco Department of Building Inspection gave the Collinses 30 days to fix the violations and pay fines. In March 2022, Collins and her husband filed plans to convert the basement into a separate unit in order to come into compliance.
