= February 2022 San Francisco special election =

The February 2022 San Francisco special election (formally, the February 15, 2022, Consolidated Special Municipal Election) was held on February 15, 2022, in San Francisco. The races on the ballot include assessor-recorder; and three ballot measures to recall members of the school board. Some voters in this election also voted in the special primary election for the 17th State Assembly district on the same ballot.

== Assessor-Recorder ==
In January 2021, Mayor London Breed appointed Joaquin Torres to be Assessor-Recorder, after Carmen Chu resigned from the position to become City Administrator. Joaquin Torres was the only candidate who registered before the deadline of November 19, 2021.

Assessor-Recorder
| Party | Candidate | Maximum round | Maximum votes | Share in maximum round | Maximum votes First round votes Transfer votes |
|---|---|---|---|---|---|
| Nonpartisan | Joaquín Torres | 1 | 117,336 | 99.91% | |
| Nonpartisan | Michael Petrelis (write-in) | 1 | 109 | 0.09% | |

February 2022 Assessor-Recorder Special Election First Round Ballot Summary
| | Count | Share of Contest Ballots |
| Continuing Votes | 117,445 | 65.25% |
| Over Votes | 1 | 0.00% |
| Under Votes | 62,293 | 34.61% |
| Contest Ballots | 179,981 | 100.00% |
| Registered Voters | 499,771 | |
| Contest Turnout | 36.01% | |

== Proposition A: Recall of Board of Education Member Alison Collins ==
Proposition A is a recall election to remove Board of Education member Alison Collins from office.

Proposition A: Recall Election of Alison Collins from the Board of Education
| Choice | Votes | % |
|---|---|---|
| For | 134,871 | 76.28 |
| Against | 41,928 | 23.72 |
| Total | 176,799 | 100.00 |
| Total votes | 179,981 | – |
| Registered voters/turnout | 499,771 | 36.01 |

== Proposition B: Recall of Board of Education Member Gabriela Lopez ==
Proposition B is a recall election to remove Board of Education member Gabriela Lopez from office.

Proposition B: Recall Election of Gabriela Lopez from the Board of Education
| Choice | Votes | % |
|---|---|---|
| For | 127,022 | 72.06 |
| Against | 49,257 | 27.94 |
| Total | 176,279 | 100.00 |
| Total votes | 179,981 | – |
| Registered voters/turnout | 499,771 | 36.01 |

== Proposition C: Recall of Board of Education Member Faauuga Moliga ==
Proposition C is a recall election to remove Board of Education member Faauuga Moliga from office.

Proposition C: Recall Election of Faauuga Moliga from the Board of Education
| Choice | Votes | % |
|---|---|---|
| For | 121,197 | 68.87 |
| Against | 54,785 | 31.13 |
| Total | 175,982 | 100.00 |
| Total votes | 179,981 | – |
| Registered voters/turnout | 499,771 | 36.01 |
