= Life of Washington =

Murals painted by Victor Arnautoff

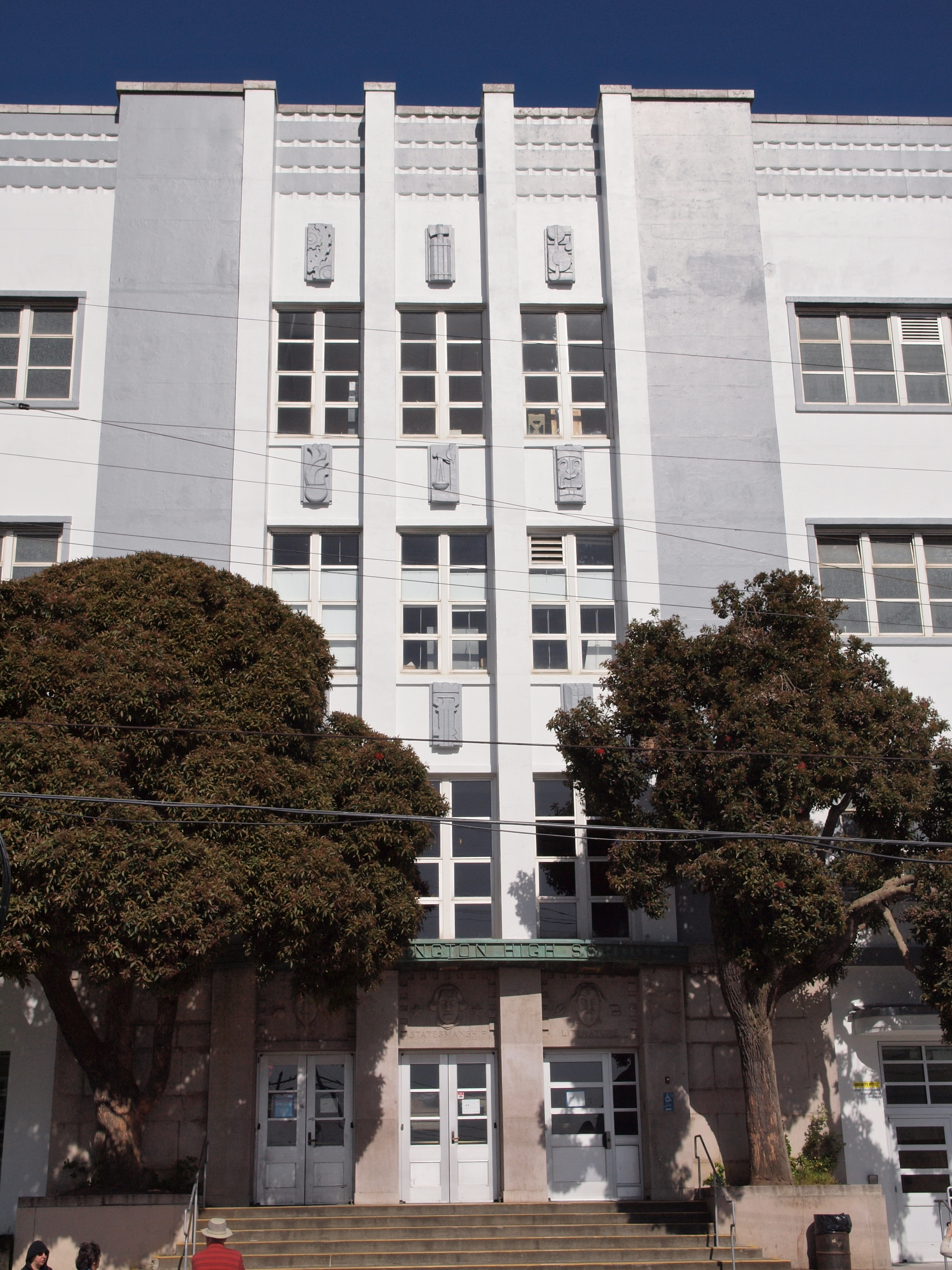
- George Washington High School in 2010
- Artist: Victor Arnautoff
- Year: 1936
- Medium: Fresco
- Movement: Social realism
- Subject: George Washington
- Dimensions: 1600 square feet
- Location: San Francisco

Life of Washington is a mural cycle in San Francisco's George Washington High School painted by Victor Arnautoff in 1936. It depicts George Washington at various real and imagined points in his life. Composed of 13 panels and spanning 1600 square feet, the work was the largest mural by a single artist that the WPA funded. According to the art critic Roberta Smith, the cycle is "among the most honest and possibly the most subversive of the W.P.A. era".

Since the 1960s, vignettes in two of the panels, entitled "Mount Vernon" and "Westward Vision", have been controversial due to their depiction of slavery and Native Americans. Activists have sought the removal of the artwork, contending that the mural's imagery creates a hostile environment. Preservationists argue that the imagery is subversive as Arnautoff, a communist protege of Diego Rivera, was critiquing the country's colonial past.

In 2019 San Francisco School Board voted to paint over all 13 panels. After a national uproar, the board decided to conceal the art work instead. Subsequently the school's alumni association sued the district for violation of California's Environmental Quality Act. In 2021, a superior court judge agreed that the law had not been followed, and ruled that the mural should remain in public view. The board initially appealed that decision; however, after three board members were ousted in the recall election of 2022, a new board voted to comply with the judge's ruling. The lawsuit cost the district $525,000 in legal fees.

== History ==
The Works Progress Administration commissioned Victor Arnautoff to paint a mural at the newly opened George Washington High School in San Francisco's Richmond District. The work took nearly a year to complete, a time which Arnautoff described as marked by “creative fire and enormous spiritual investment.” "I tried my best to convey the spirit of Washington's time”, Arnautoff wrote in his autobiography. Upon its completion, the San Francisco Chronicle called it “one of the major masterpieces of fresco on this coast". The work spanned a total of 1600 square feet and was composed of 13 panels, of which two were to become controversial: One depicts slaves working at Washington's Mount Vernon estate, and the other shows the body of an apparently slain Native American during the country's westward expansion.

=== 1960s–1970s: Early protests and the response mural ===
Student activists sought to remove the mural in the 1960s and 1970s due to its depiction of slavery. Members of the School's Black Student Union initially demanded that the mural be destroyed but after discussions with Arnautoff's son and local artists decided that it was “historically sound and should remain on view”. Instead, they demanded that a Black artist be hired to paint a response mural, recommending painter Dewey Crumpler for the job. A poll of the students at the time, by principal Ruth Adams, found that 61% favored supplementing rather than removing the mural.

The San Francisco Arts Commission and the San Francisco Board of Education hired Crumpler to paint a "response mural" that depicted the historic struggles of people of color in America. Arnautoff indicated he was glad his work had "provided the impetus for this new progressive work". Crumpler devoted 8 years to complete his mural, dubbed Multi-Ethnic Heritage, in conversation with Washington students, and said repeatedly that he was against destroying Arnautoff's mural: “My mural is part of the Arnautoff mural, part of its meaning, and its meaning is part of mine. If you destroy his work of art, you are destroying mine as well.”

=== 2016–2022: Destruction vote by the school board ===
In 2016, Matt Haney, who was president of San Francisco Board of Education at the time, restarted a discussion of the mural when he proposed on Twitter that the school should be renamed after alumna Maya Angelou, because George Washington was a slave owner. In 2018 the Board opposed city's nomination of the George Washington High School as a historical landmark "over concerns that the designation could complicate the potential removal" of the mural. In June 2019, the San Francisco Board of Education voted unanimously to paint over all thirteen panels, with commissioner Mark Sanchez stating that "this is reparations". Sanchez later added that simply concealing the mural wasn't an option because it would “allow for the possibility of them being uncovered in the future.” The cost was estimated at $600,000 to $875,000. Prior to the decision, 8 out of 11 members of a community panel, called "Reflection and Action Working Group", had voted to archive the mural and then paint it over because the artwork “glorifies slavery, genocide, colonization, Manifest Destiny, white supremacy, oppression, etc.” and does not reflect SFUSD's “values of social justice”. Some alumni had previously complained that the imagery of slavery and the dead Native American are harmful to students. Supporters of removing the mural included alumna Lateefah Simon, and Supervisor Shamann Walton.

==== Opposition to the vote ====
The board's decision to destroy the mural drew widespread criticism on the local and national level. Opponents of destroying the mural in the Bay Area included prominent members of the African American community: alumnus Danny Glover, alumni parents Alice Walker and Willie Brown, and president of the local branch of NAACP Amos Brown. Arnautoff's biographer, Professor Robert Cherny of San Francisco State University, argued that the mural was created as a "counter narrative" to what was being taught in schools at the time: Arnautoff "was very critical of Washington for owning slaves, and ... of the genocide of Native Americans”. Apollo arts magazine agreed that "Arnautoff's focus on Native Americans, enslaved African Americans, and a rioting underclass overthrowing British tyranny provides a template for telling a different story of America's foundations."

Crumpler, now a professor at San Francisco Art Institute, continued to advocate for keeping the mural: “Art's role, if it's any good, is to make us uncomfortable with the status quo”. Many other Bay Area art leaders, polled by San Francisco Chronicle, urged preserving the mural for public view. Historian Robin Kelley stated that in using the word "reparations", Mark Sanchez "not only perverts the concept of reparations" but also fails to see that the funds for the high cost of destruction "could have been invested in arts education or an anti-racist curriculum". A poll of San Francisco voters, commissioned by the Coalition to Protect Public Art, found that 76% opposed destroying the mural, including 72% of people of color. Supporters of the coalition included former mayor Art Agnos, former Supervisor Matt Gonzalez, and vice president of the George Washington High School Alumni Association Lope Yap Jr. California senator, Dianne Feinstein, declared her opposition to removing the mural as well. Gray Brechin, the founder of "Living New Deal" project and UC Berkeley professor, called on people “to recall the school board.”

Condemnation of the board's decision reached national proportions with a column by Bari Weiss in The New York Times. Afterward 400 artists and scholars signed a letter asking the board to reverse its decision. Signatories included noted academics Aijaz Ahmad, Wendy Brown, Judith Butler, Hal Foster, Michael Fried, Fredric Jameson, David Harvey, and Adolph Reed. The letter stated that the mural "is an important work of art, produced for all Americans under the auspices of a federal government seeking to ensure the survival of art during the Great Depression ... its meaning and commitments are not in dispute. It exposes and denounces in pictorial form the US history of racism and colonialism. The only viewers who should feel unsafe before this mural are racists.” Rocco Landesman, the former chairman of the National Endowment for the Arts, added "when important artworks of our cultural heritage are not just hidden away but destroyed, how do these desecrations differ from those of the Taliban, who blew up the Bamiyan Buddhas in Afghanistan, or the ISIS commanders who destroyed ancient monuments near Palmyra, Syria?” This is "philistinism", Landesman concluded.

==== Reversal of the vote and the Alumni lawsuit ====
The decision to destroy the mural was reversed in August 2019, with 4 to 3 vote to cover it up with panels instead. Board members who voted in the minority, insisting that the art work be destroyed, were Alison Collins, Gabriella Lopez, and Mark Sanchez. Subsequently, the George Washington High School Alumni Association sued the school board for its failure to conduct an environmental review as required by the California Environmental Quality Act.

On July 27, 2021, superior court judge Anne-Christine Massullo ruled in favor of the alumni association, preventing the board from covering the mural. Judge Massullo wrote: "Neutral administrative procedures must be applied without regard to political interests." The judge also found out that the 11 member community panel assembled in 2019 had made up its mind before organizing public meetings. “A PowerPoint presentation,” she wrote, “did not contain one reference to keeping the murals.” The evidence "overwhelmingly" supports the Alumni Association's case, the judge concluded.

On October 5, 2021, the board decided by a 6 to 1 vote to appeal the decision. Up to that time the case had cost the district $148,000 in legal fees, while the district faced a budget shortfall of $116 million.

In addition to California state regulations, the frescos may also be protected under federal law, since Arnautoff's work was commissioned by W.P.A. In 2019, General Services Administration indicated that it was conducting research to determine whether the mural was property of the federal government, and asked the district to keep it updated.

==== Recall of school board members ====
On February 15, 2022, commissioners Alison Collins and Gabriella Lopez were recalled from office, by 76% and 72% of the vote respectively. It was San Francisco's first ever election to oust members of the School Board, and the first successful recall election in San Francisco since the ouster of California Senator Edwin Grant in 1914. The mural destruction attempt was cited as one of the "key controversies" leading to the recall. Mark Sanchez, the only other commissioner who did not reverse his destruction vote, was not eligible for recall at that time.

==== Compliance with judge's ruling ====
In a 4-3 vote on June 22, 2022, the new school board decided to follow the judge's order to vacate its previous decision to cover the mural, and abandon its attempts to appeal that decision. The commissioners who voted against the measure were Mark Alexander, Kevine Boggess, and Mark Sanchez. Up to that time the legal costs had grown to $525,000 while the district faced a budget shortfall of $125 million.

== Style and themes ==
Arnautoff painted the mural directly on wet plaster in the social realist style, much akin to the frescos of his mentor, Diego Rivera. He was a well-known radical and communist who had been investigated by the House Un-American Activities Committee, and painted other murals containing allegedly subversive imagery. For instance, in the City Life mural painted in Coit Tower, Arnautoff included a self portrait next to a magazine stand filled with leftist publications. In an interview in 1935, Arnautoff stated “The artist is a critic of society.... I wish to deal with people, to explain to them things and ideas they may not have seen or understood.”

In Life of Washington, Arnautoff placed slaves and working people in the center of several of the panels, rather than Washington. In the words of Arnautoff's biographer, "the mural makes clear that slave labor provide[d] the plantation's economic basis", at a time when high school history classes "ignored... that the nation's founders... owned other human beings as chattel". Similarly, Arnautoff placed the body of a dead Native American at the feet of pioneers, "challenging the prevailing narrative that westward expansion had been into largely vacant territory waiting for white pioneers to develop its full potential".

The Native American in the "Westward Vision" panel is rendered in full color, facing away from the viewer, while the pioneers walking behind it are depicted in "ghostly hues of grey and white". According to Apollo art magazine, "the direct connection between the policies of the founding fathers and Indian genocide is made obvious by Arnautoff's placement of George Washington in the panel. His right hand points to a map and his left to the ghostly white settlers, as in the panel's background forests give way to cities". Inducing discomfort in the viewer "was precisely Arnautoff's point". Dewey Crumpler and others have suggested that the tree painted next to the Native American's head is an ironic reference to the Washington cherry tree myth that eulogized Washington as a symbol of honesty.

== See also ==
- Man at the Crossroads (1934) — Fresco by Diego Rivera destroyed over its communist themes
- Refregier murals (1948) — San Francisco murals investigated by U.S. Congress for being "Anti-American"
- Pioneer Monument (1894) — A portion of this San Francisco monument was removed in 2018 over its depiction of Native Americans
- List of New Deal murals
