= Matt Haney =

American politician (born 1982)

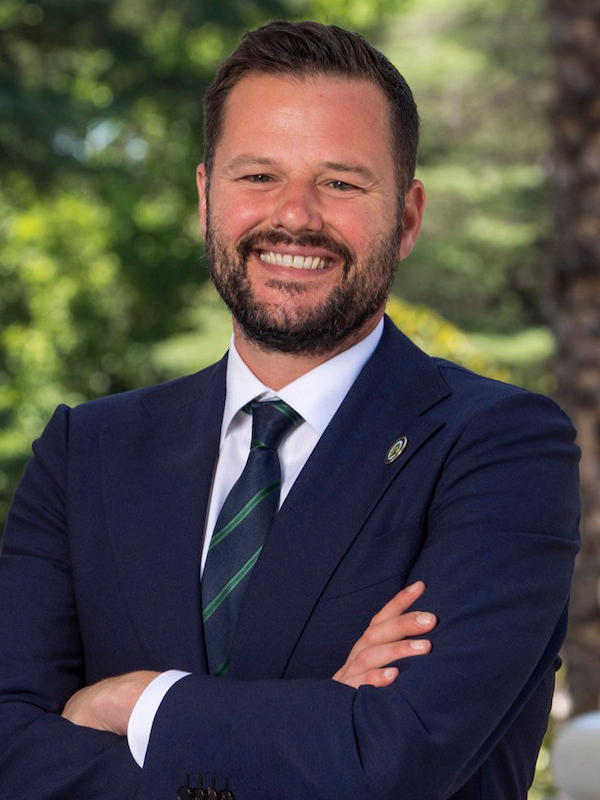
- Official portrait, 2022

Member of the California State Assembly from the 17th district
- Incumbent
- Assumed office May 3, 2022
- Preceded by: David Chiu

Member of the San Francisco Board of Supervisors from the 6th district
- In office January 8, 2019 – May 3, 2022
- Preceded by: Jane Kim
- Succeeded by: Matt Dorsey

Personal details
- Born: Matthew Craig Haney; April 17, 1982 (age 44) Santa Cruz County, California, U.S.
- Party: Democratic
- Education: University of California, Berkeley (BA); Stanford University (MA, JD); National University of Ireland (LLM)
- Website: State Assembly website

Matthew Craig Haney (born April 17, 1982) is an American politician from San Francisco currently serving as a member of the California State Assembly from the 17th district, covering the eastern portion of the city. A progressive member of the Democratic Party, Haney had represented District 6 on the San Francisco Board of Supervisors from 2019 to 2022 and previously served as a commissioner on the San Francisco Board of Education from 2013 to 2019.

In 2022, Haney won a special election to the California State Assembly to succeed David Chiu, who became City Attorney of San Francisco. He placed first in the primary election and defeated former supervisor David Campos, a fellow Democrat, in a runoff. He was sworn in on May 3, 2022.

== Early life and education ==
Haney was born in Santa Cruz County, California, raised in the San Francisco Bay Area and attended public schools in Albany, California. His mother, Kris Calvin, served on the South Pasadena School Board.

He has a Bachelor of Arts in 2005 from the University of California, Berkeley, and an LL.M in human rights from the National University of Ireland, where he was a Mitchell Scholar. He has a Master of Arts in 2010 from the Stanford Graduate School of Education and a JD in 2010 from Stanford Law School. Haney worked at both the Stanford Design School and at the JFK School of Law, and Sociology at Palo Alto University, where he taught education law. Haney taught Education Law at the JFK School of Law in addition to teaching Sociology at Palo Alto University and served as a Fellow and Adjunct Faculty at the Stanford Design School.

== Early career ==
After graduating from UC Berkeley in 2005, Haney was a legislative aide for long-time California State Senator Joe Simitian. He was the Executive Director of the UC Student Association.

Haney is the former National Policy Director for The Dream Corps. In 2015, he co-founded #cut50, an Oakland-based national nonprofit designed to end mass incarceration, with Van Jones and Jessica Jackson.

== San Francisco School Board (2012–2019) ==
In April 2012, Haney announced his candidacy for the San Francisco Board of Education election for one of four open seats. He was elected in the November 2012 San Francisco general election, placing fourth behind three incumbents. Haney replaced Norman Yee, who forwent re-election to run for the San Francisco Board of Supervisors.

Upon his election, Haney was the youngest member of the commission and one of the only members of an urban school board in California under the age of 35. Prior to his election, he served two years on San Francisco Unified School District’s Public Education Enrichment Fund Community Advisory Committee and Restorative Justice Committee.

Haney, Sandra Lee Fewer, and Shamann Walton authored a resolution that required the district's food vendor to disclose the origin of their food products. It passed with a unanimous vote in May 2016.

While serving as president of the school board, Haney proposed on Twitter that George Washington High School should be renamed to honor poet Maya Angelou, an alumna of the school. He cited objections to George Washington's role as a slaveowner. He also proposed removing but not painting over the Life of Washington mural by Victor Arnautoff inside of the school. He cited his objection to its depiction of slavery and dead Native Americans. Haney and Commissioner Stevon Cook co-authored a resolution in 2018 to establish a panel to examine which schools to rename.

Haney introduced a resolution calling for the end of the current all-choice-based student-assignment system.

President Barack Obama endorsed Haney during his re-election campaign in 2016. It was one of the 150 endorsements he made the weekend prior to the 2016 United States elections. Haney was previously a volunteer for Obama's 2008 presidential campaign but had not sought the endorsement.

== San Francisco Supervisor (2019–2022) ==
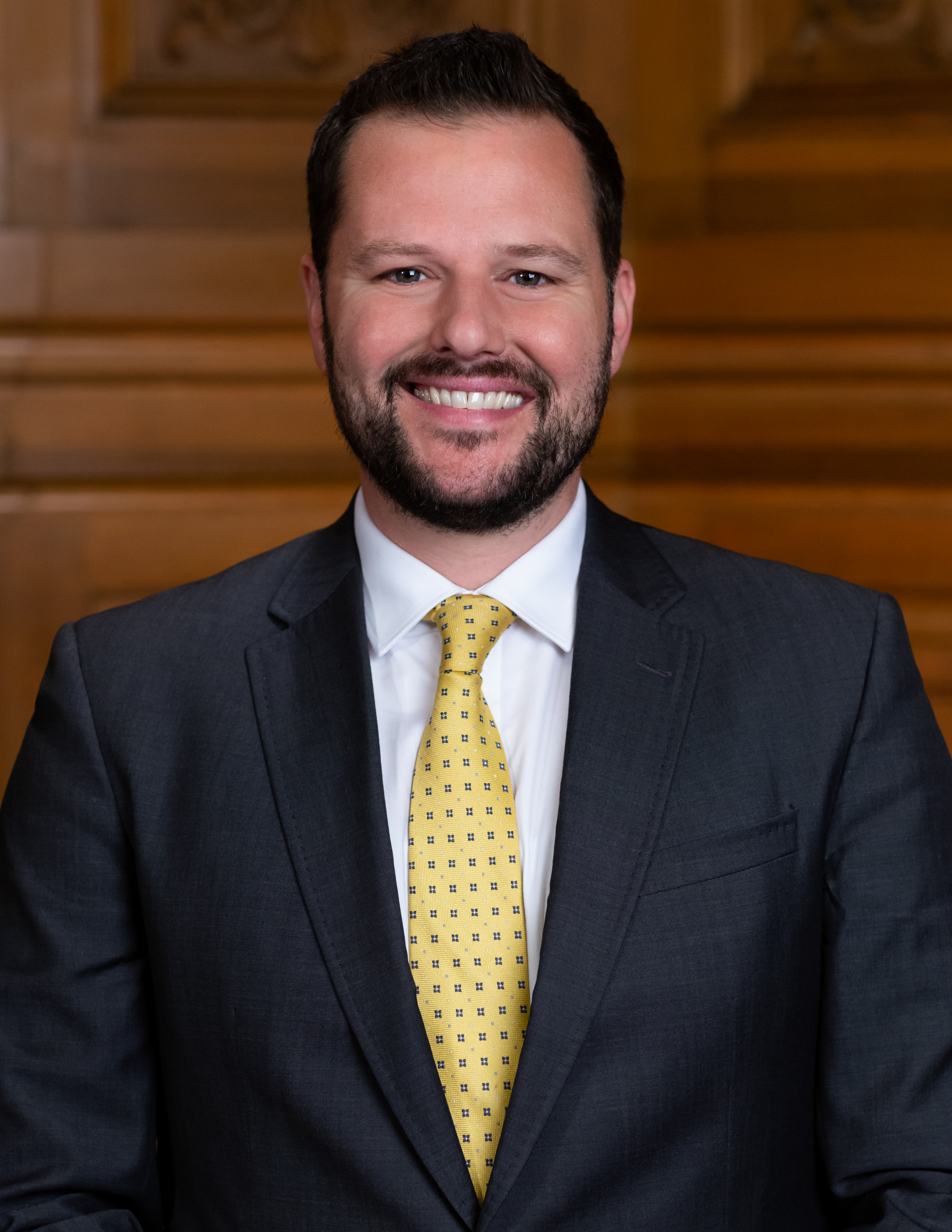
Haney's official supervisorial portrait, 2020.

In September 2017, Haney filed to run in the 2018 San Francisco Board of Supervisors election to represent District 6.

Haney was elected Supervisor for District 6 on November 6, 2018, receiving 14,249 first preference votes (56.24 percent of all valid votes). (San Francisco has ranked choice voting.) After allocation of preferences from eliminated candidates in San Francisco's ranked-choice voting system, Haney received 63.12 percent of final-round votes, compared to 36.88 percent for runner-up Christine Johnson, a former planning commissioner. Haney was sworn in at the Board of Supervisors' January 8, 2019, meeting, replacing Jane Kim, who was ineligible to run for re-election after two four-year terms.

A "progressive" majority was created upon his and Gordon Mar's election to the board.

Per the law, Haney resigned as supervisor before being sworn into the Legislature for the state Assembly's 17th district on May 3, 2022. Mayor London Breed appointed Matt Dorsey to fill Haney's spot as supervisor.

=== Housing ===
Haney's views in housing shifted during his time on the Board of Supervisors, becoming increasingly supportive of additional housing and regulatory streamlining for housing construction. During the 2018 campaign for Supervisor, Haney ran against a leader of the YIMBY movement and questioned the need for every neighborhood to build housing, stating "I'm not going to pick fights on the other side of the city." Haney initially opposed state bill SB 35, which streamlined housing production in cities that were falling short of state-mandated minimums, but later came to support the bill. In 2021, Haney supported state action to ensure cities allow the construction of more housing, and supported a local bill to legalize fourplexes on lots zoned for single-family homes.

In October 2021, Haney supported the construction of a 495-unit apartment complex on a parking lot next to a BART station, but was the proposal was voted down 7-4 by his colleagues. That same month, Haney voted against the construction of 316 micro-homes in Tenderloin, 13.5% of which would have been designated as affordable housing.

=== Business ===
In 2020, Haney authored the nation’s first ‘Overpaid CEO Tax’ (Proposition L). The tax charges companies in San Francisco a 0.1% surcharge on their annual business taxes if their top executives earn more than 100 times more than their ‘typical local worker’. The measure is one of the first in the country to address growing income inequality between workers and CEOs in the United States. This Proposition was passed during the 2020 elections with 65.18%.

Haney wrote an opinion piece in the San Francisco Chronicle endorsing a No vote on Proposition 22 in 2020. The proposition would have granted app-based transportation and delivery companies such as DoorDash, Uber, Lyft and other gig-economy companies an exception to Assembly Bill 5 by classifying their drivers as "independent contractors".

=== New Department of Sanitation ===
Haney introduced Proposition B, which amends San Francisco’s Charter to form the Department of Sanitation and Streets by splitting it from the San Francisco Department of Public Works, in 2020. It would also create the Sanitation and Streets Commission and a Public Works Commission to provide oversight to the departments. The Board of Supervisors placed it on the ballot with a 7 to 4 vote. Proposition B passed in the November 2020 elections with 200,251 votes or 60.87%.

=== Healthcare ===
Haney supported opening a safe injection site in his district by the Tenderloin district. Haney represented the Tenderloin and SoMa, two districts within the city most impacted by fatal drug overdoses.

== California State Assembly (2022–present) ==
=== Election ===
Haney ran for the California State Assembly to serve the remainder of the term of David Chiu, who vacated the seat upon his appointment as City Attorney of San Francisco. Haney and former supervisor David Campos garnered the most votes in the special primary on February 15, 2022, but neither had more than 50% of the vote (Haney's 36.44% to Campos's 35.67%). Both candidates thus advanced to a runoff in a special general election on April 19, 2022. According to the Wall Street Journal, the election centered on the issue of "Which candidate wants to build more housing." Haney won the runoff with 62% of the vote, and was sworn in on May 3, 2022.

=== Tenure ===
Haney is a member of the California Legislative Progressive Caucus.

In 2026 Haney introduced a bill to make it illegal to resell a live entertainment ticket for over 10% of face value. It failed to pass after aggressive lobbying efforts from ticket resale companies.

== Personal life ==
Haney has a brother and a sister. His sister, Erin Haney, is senior counsel for #cut50, a nonprofit he co-founded.

== Electoral history ==
=== San Francisco Board of Education ===
2012 San Francisco Board of Education election
Candidate	Votes	%
Sandra Lee Fewer (incumbent)	128,500	16.9
Jill Wynns (incumbent)	106,531	14.0
Rachel Norton (incumbent)	102,033	13.4
Matt Haney	100,552	13.3
Kim Garcia-Meza	59,930	7.9
Shamann Walton	58,194	7.7
Sam Rodriguez	50,554	6.7
Gladys Soto	49,839	6.6
Beverly Ho-A-Yun Popek	36,059	4.8
Victoria Lo	35,779	4.7
Paul Robertson	29,562	3.9
Write-in	1,164	0.2
Total votes	758,697	100.0

2016 San Francisco Board of Education election
Candidate	Votes	%
Matt Haney (incumbent)	175,803	18.9
Mark Sanchez	155,706	16.7
Stevon Cook	152,335	16.4
Rachel Norton (incumbent)	129,012	13.9
Jill Wynns (incumbent)	94,571	10.2
Trevor McNeil	86,233	9.3
Phil Kim	65,045	7.0
Ian Kalin	44,788	4.8
Rob Geller	25,617	2.8
Write-in	1,482	0.2
Total votes	930,592	100.0

=== San Francisco Board of Supervisors ===
2018 San Francisco Board of Supervisors 6th district election
Candidate	Votes	%
Matt Haney	14,249	56.4
Christine Johnson	6,237	24.6
Sonja Trauss	4,759	18.8
Write-in	93	0.4
Total votes	25,338	100.0

=== California State Assembly ===
2022 California State Assembly 17th district special election Vacancy resulting from the resignation of David Chiu
Primary election
Party	Candidate	Votes	%
Democratic	Matt Haney	34,174	36.4
Democratic	David Campos	33,448	35.7
Democratic	Bilal Mahmood	20,895	22.3
Democratic	Thea Selby	5,261	5.6
Total votes		93,778	100.0
General election
Democratic	Matt Haney	48,762	62.4
Democratic	David Campos	29,422	37.6
Total votes		78,184	100.0
Democratic hold			

2022 California State Assembly 17th district election
Primary election
Party	Candidate	Votes	%
Democratic	Matt Haney (incumbent)	69,412	63.2
Democratic	David Campos	27,270	24.8
Republican	Bill Shireman	13,071	11.9
Total votes		109,753	100.0
General election
Democratic	Matt Haney (incumbent)	101,891	69.1
Democratic	David Campos	45,470	30.9
Total votes		147,361	100.0
Democratic hold			

2024 California State Assembly 17th district election
Primary election
Party	Candidate	Votes	%
Democratic	Matt Haney (incumbent)	90,915	81.9
Republican	Manuel Noris-Barrera	13,843	12.5
Democratic	Otto Duke	6,245	5.6
Total votes		111,003	100.0
General election
Democratic	Matt Haney (incumbent)	169,490	84.6
Republican	Manuel Noris-Barrera	30,900	15.4
Total votes		200,390	100.0
Democratic hold			

== Sources ==
- San Francisco Board of Supervisors. "District 6: Matt Haney".
- San Francisco Department of Elections. "November 6, 2018 Election Results – Summary".
- San Francisco Department of Elections. "RCV Results Report: Board of Supervisors, District 6" (PDF) (pdf).
