= 2022 San Francisco Board of Education recall elections =

- February 15, 2022

3 of the 7 seats in the San Francisco Board of Education

The 2022 San Francisco Board of Education recall elections (also called the San Francisco school board recall elections) were held on February 15, 2022. In a landslide election, over two-thirds of voters chose to remove three San Francisco Board of Education (School Board) Commissioners—Alison Collins, Board President Gabriela Lopez, and Faauuga Moliga—from office. All three commissioners were replaced by appointees chosen by Mayor London Breed. The other four members of the school board were not eligible for recall at this time.

The recall election was the first in San Francisco since the failed recall election of then-Mayor Dianne Feinstein in 1983, the first successful recall since the ouster of State Senator Edwin Grant in 1914, and the first ever attempt to remove members of the School Board. Supporters of the recall accused the commissioners of incompetence, mismanagement of the school district, and misplaced priorities. Opponents contended that recalls were anti-democratic efforts backed by Republicans, billionaires, and charter school supporters.

The election was part of a "recall fever" during the COVID-19 pandemic in California, which saw many recall petitions leading to elections that targeted elected officials throughout California, such as the successful recall of S.F. District Attorney Chesa Boudin and the failed recall of Governor Gavin Newsom. The recall election was held as part of the February 2022 San Francisco special election, concurrent with a special election to for the California State Assembly seat vacated by David Chiu.

== Background ==
Since 2019, the board came under national attention and criticism for a string of controversies, which generated various lawsuits, including one by the city itself. The first major controversy arose when the board voted to destroy the Life of Washington murals, and after a public outcry decided to cover the murals instead, which was blocked in court due to the California Environmental Quality Act. During the COVID-19 pandemic the school district kept schools closed, and was slower to open than other major districts, even as case counts were lower, prompting the city to sue the school district. During this period the board focused on renaming schools that it alleged had racism or oppressive backgrounds and ending merit-based admissions at Lowell High School. Alumni groups successfully challenged these decisions in court, citing violations of the Brown Act.

In March 2021, tweets from Commissioner Alison Collins came to light that offended the Asian American community, prompting condemnation and calls for Collins to resign from many in the political community, including Mayor London Breed. The Board of Education approved a motion of no confidence on Collins 5–2, with Commissioners Collins and Gabriela Lopez in dissent, which removed Collins from her vice president title and her committee positions. On March 31, 2021, Alison Collins filed a lawsuit against the school district and her fellow commissioners who had voted for the motion of no confidence. On August 16, 2021, a federal judge dismissed the lawsuit for having no merit. The lawsuit cost the school district over $110,000.

== Path to the ballot ==
On February 21, 2021, Autumn Looijen and Siva Raj formed a campaign committee to recall Commissioners Alison Collins, Gabriela Lopez, and Faauuga Moliga from the Board of Education. (The remaining four commissioners were not eligible because they had not been in office for at least 6 months.) By the petition submission deadline of September 7, 2021, recall campaign supporters submitted over 77,000 voter signatures to recall each of the three commissioners. On October 18, 2021, city officials announced that each of the three recall petitions met the minimum qualifications of 51,325 valid voter signatures. City officials set the election date to be February 15, 2022. It was the first recall election of a San Francisco elected official since the failed 1983 recall election of then-Mayor Dianne Feinstein, and the first ever attempt to remove members of the School Board.

== Polling and arguments ==
A February 2021 poll found that 60% of registered voters supported the recall. In particular, 69% of voters who were public school parents supported it. A May 2021 poll found that 71% of voters gave the school board a negative rating, and 10% of voters a positive rating.

=== Arguments in support of the recall ===
Supporters of the recall accused the commissioners of negligence, expressing anger that public school remained closed in 2020–2021 while other districts and private schools opened in the Bay Area. Commissioners were accused of misplaced priorities focusing on school renaming and Lowell admissions as students were struggling with distance learning. Recall supporters alleged that the commissioners mishandled the budget and declining enrollment, delaying budget cuts until one day before the state deadline, and risking a state takeover of the school district. Supporters argued it was urgent to recall the three Commissioners from office in order to make important decisions around the district's budget deficit and the selection of a new superintendent. Collins's tweets about Asian Americans, and the subsequent lawsuit against the school district and her fellow commissioners, were cited as additional reasons to remove her from office.

California State Senator Scott Wiener stated that "Not only did these commissioners fail to do their jobs adequately, they engaged in abusive and disruptive behavior, interfered with the Superintendent's ability to do his job, and caused the school district to deteriorate during the pandemic." Wiener singled out Collins for her tweets against Asian Americans. Mayor London Breed stated that "Sadly, our school board's priorities have often been severely misplaced". The San Francisco Chronicle Editorial Board cited incompetence of the board members as the primary reason for its endorsement. The San Francisco Examiner Editorial Board stated that the board had become a "national laughingstock" and that "Ignoring the basics of the job, they put political grandstanding ahead of progress for children." Former supervisor and public defender Matt Gonzalez supported the recall due to the commissioners' lack of competence, and various decisions starting with the vote to destroy the Life of Washington mural.

=== Arguments against the recall ===
Critics of the recall called the recall a transfer of power from voters to the mayor because the mayor would appoint a replacement for each commissioner who was successfully removed from office. Critics call the recall election a distraction, and a waste of money and time when the regularly scheduled election would come nine months later in November 2022. Recall opponents connect the recall to Republicans and efforts to create more charter schools, citing large donations from individuals who have supported such causes. Supervisor Shamann Walton stated that the recall was driven by "closet Republicans". The teachers union, United Educators of San Francisco, also opposed the recall.

Collins called the recall campaign "a move toward mayoral control and less local control... for parents who are immigrants who can vote". She called the recall campaign "politically motivated" and stated that "When I see certain people getting upset, I know I'm doing the right thing". The recall is "clearly an attack on democracies", and "I'm actually really proud of my work on the board," she stated. Collins has alleged in multiple interviews that the recall is a conspiracy pushed by "billionaires" and conservative think tanks. Venture capitalist Arthur Rock donated $400,000 to this recall election, as he had with local elections across the United States.

Lopez stated that opposition to the board's actions were due to racism, "to bring down someone who is me" (a young Latina woman), and "people want us to say we regret doing what we did ... that will never be something I will do."

== Finances ==
The recall campaign raised more than $1.9 million, including $400,000 from venture capitalist Arthur Rock. The anti-recall campaign raised about $39,000. A separate effort to fight Faauuga Moliga's recall raised about $45,000.

== Endorsements ==
Proponents

Endorsed recalling Collins, Lopez, and Moliga

- Mayor London Breed
- Former mayor Art Agnos
- State Senator Scott Wiener
- California Treasurer Fiona Ma
- Former US Representative John Burton
- Former Supervisor Matt Gonzalez
- San Francisco Chronicle editorial board
- San Francisco Examiner editorial board
- Bay Area Reporter editorial board

Endorsed recalling only Collins and Lopez

- Supervisor Rafael Mandelman

Endorsed recalling only Collins

- Supervisor Matt Haney
- Supervisor Hillary Ronen
- Former Supervisor David Campos
Opponents
- Supervisor Connie Chan
- Supervisor Gordon Mar
- Supervisor Dean Preston
- Supervisor Shamann Walton
- Former State Assemblyman and Supervisor Tom Ammiano
- United Educators of San Francisco

== Results ==
The election was held on February 15, 2022.

Results as of February 23, 2022 16:00 PST:

Proposition A: Recall Election of Alison Collins from the Board of Education
Choice	Votes	%
For	134,871	76.28
Against	41,928	23.72
Total	176,799	100.00
Registered voters/turnout	499,771	36.01

Proposition B: Recall Election of Gabriela Lopez from the Board of Education
Choice	Votes	%
For	127,022	72.06
Against	49,257	27.94
Total	176,279	100.00
Registered voters/turnout	499,771	36.01

Proposition C: Recall Election of Faauuga Moliga from the Board of Education
Choice	Votes	%
For	121,197	68.87
Against	54,785	31.13
Total	175,982	100.00
Registered voters/turnout	499,771	36.01

== See also ==
- 2021 California gubernatorial recall election
- 2022 San Francisco District Attorney recall election
