= Lowell High School (San Francisco) =

Public high school in San Francisco, California

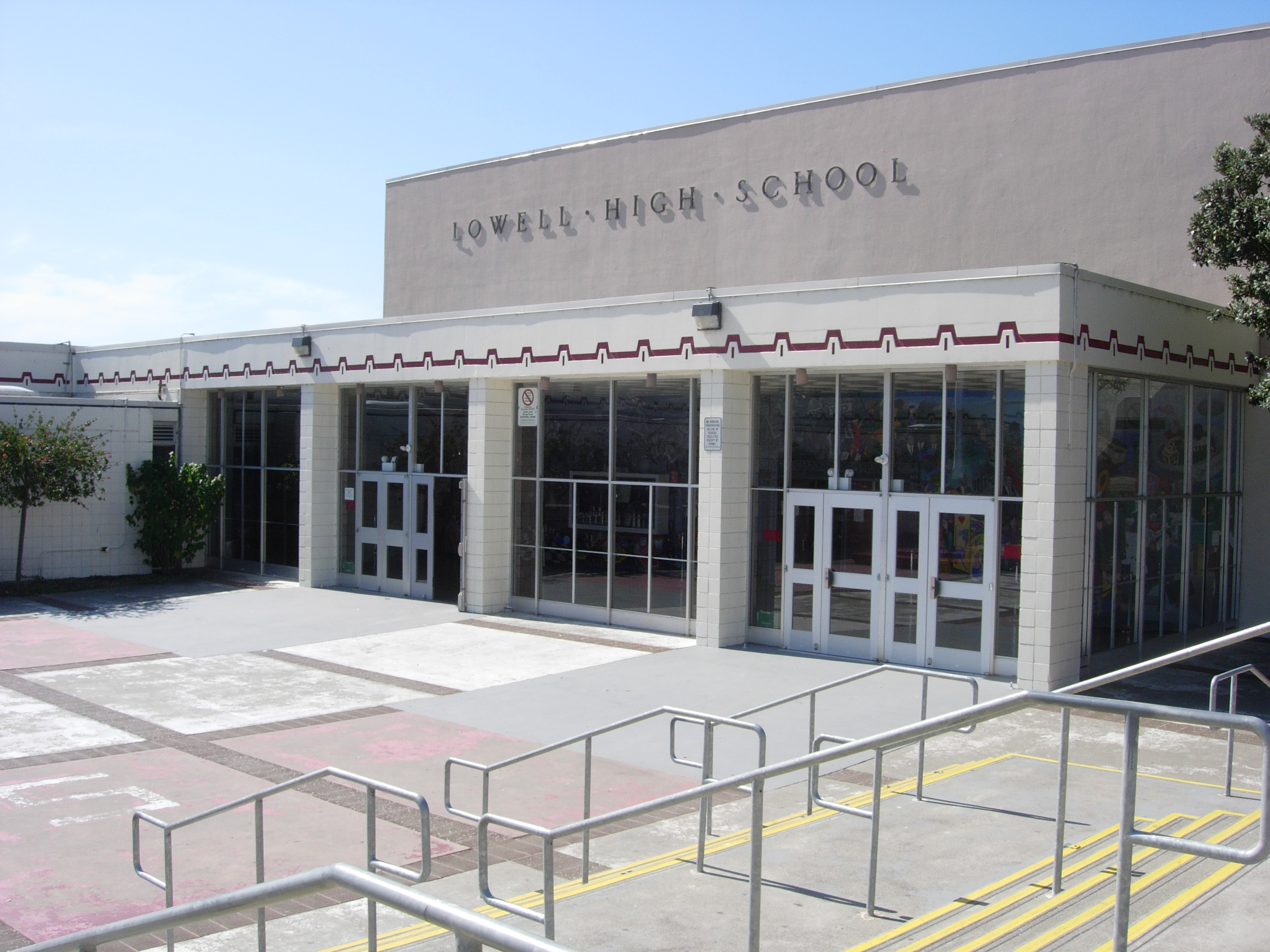
- Lowell High School's Main Entrance

Location
- 1101 Eucalyptus Drive; San Francisco, California 94132; United States; 37°43′51″N 122°29′01″W

Information
- Type: Public
- Motto: Fiat Scientia ("Let there be knowledge")
- Founded: 1856; 170 years ago (as Union Grammar School)
- School board: San Francisco Board of Education
- School district: San Francisco Unified School District
- School number: 697
- CEEB code: 052970
- Principal: Jan Bautista
- Teaching staff: 128.51 (FTE)
- Enrollment: 2,540 (2023–2024)
- Student to teacher ratio: 19.76
- Campus type: Urban
- Colors: Cardinal; White
- Song: The Lowell Hymn
- Mascot: Cardinal
- Team name: Cardinals
- Accreditation: Western Association of Schools and Colleges
- USNWR ranking: 78th
- Academic Performance Index average: 948
- Newspaper: The Lowell
- Yearbook: The Red and White
- Honor society: Shield & Scroll Honor and Service Society
- Website: beta.sfusd.edu/school/lowell-high-school

Lowell High School (LHS) is a co-educational, magnet public high school in San Francisco, California, first established in 1856. It is a part of the San Francisco Unified School District (SFUSD). Situated on the West Side of the city, the school is south of Parkside, west of Stonestown Galleria, north of San Francisco State University and Parkmerced, northeast of Lake Merced, and east of Lakeshore Elementary School.

LHS uses merit-based admissions, unlike other schools in the district, which use a lottery system or receive students from a specified attendance area. The admissions process requires submitting scores from standardized testing from the previous school year and a writing supplement. Previously an entrance exam was required, but after reports of racism in the admissions department and the COVID-19 pandemic, the exam was waived in 2021. However, because academic performance of the school declined, it reinstated use of standardized test scores.

== History ==
=== 1853–1893 ===
In 1853, Colonel Thomas J. Nevins, San Francisco's first superintendent of schools, raised the idea of a free high school for boys and a seminary for girls. It took three years for Nevins to persuade the Board of Education, and a resolution was passed on July 10, 1856, to establish a San Francisco High School and Ladies' Seminary. Six days later, however, the resolution was rescinded on the grounds that a high school could not legally be part of the San Francisco Common Schools. A name change from the proposed San Francisco High School and Ladies' Seminary to the Union Grammar School appeased those who had opposed the creation of a high school.

The Union Grammar School first opened on August 25, 1856, in rented quarters at the Wesleyan Methodist Church on Powell Street, between Clay and Sacramento. In 1860, the church was purchased and reconstructed as a school at the same location. The new two-story school building had four classrooms, an assembly room, and two rooms for gymnastics exercises and calisthenics. Dedication ceremonies for the new structure took place on September 19, 1860. The school in the new building was already referred to as San Francisco High School because it was generally recognized that the course of study was on the secondary level.

In May 1864, the Board of Education decided to form separate schools for boys and girls. The boys' school remained at the same campus as Boys' High School, while girls were moved to their own school at Bush and Stockton streets (Girls' High School), where they would remain until the return of coeducation (in practice) in the 1880s.

=== 1894–1962 ===
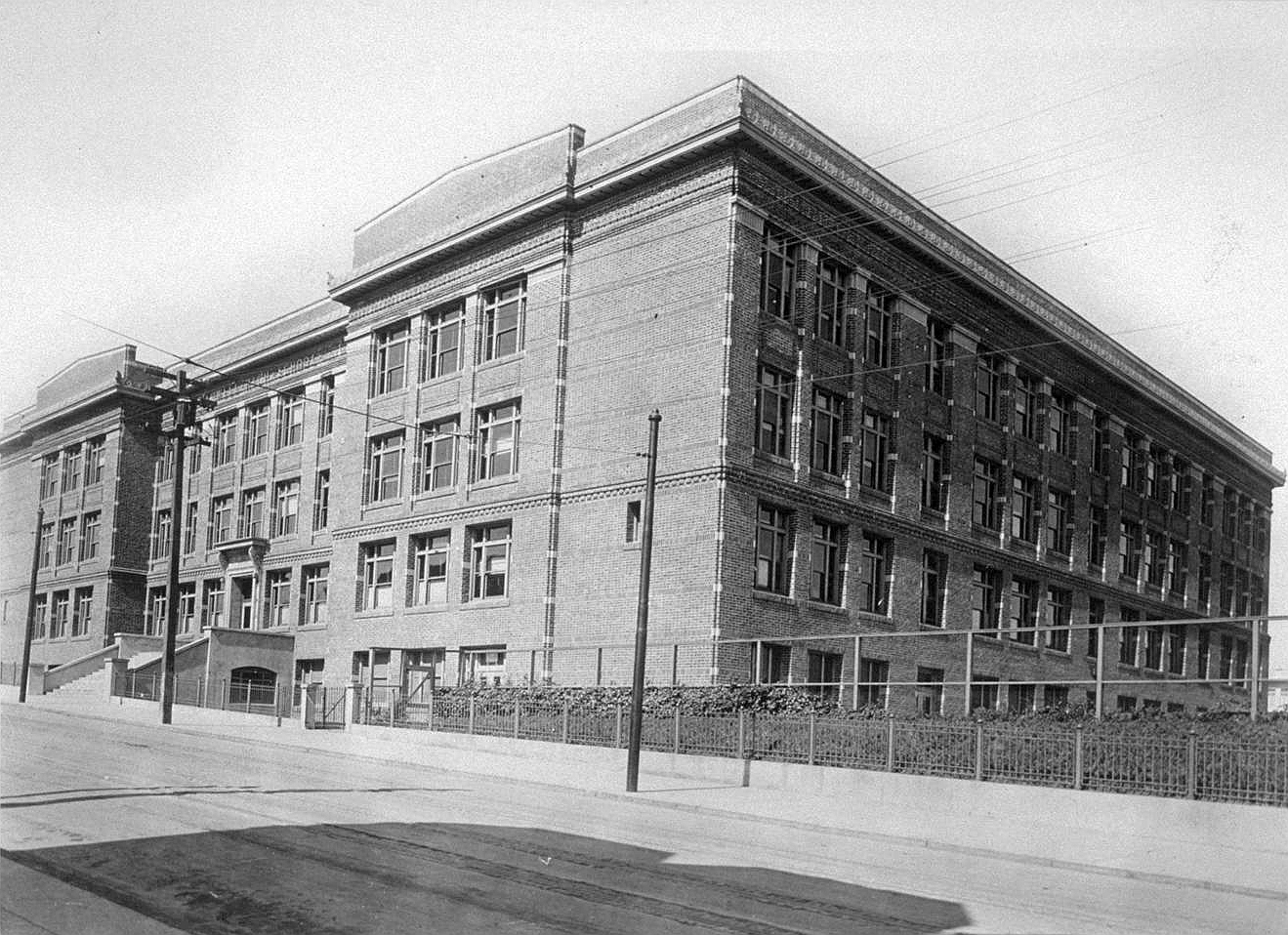
Lowell High School in 1917 at Hayes and Masonic streets

In 1894, because the name Boys' High School was not in accord with the growing number of girls taking its college-preparatory classes, the school was renamed to honor the distinguished poet James Russell Lowell, chiefly through the efforts of Pelham W. Ames, a member of the school board.

The school relocated in January 1913 to an entire block on Hayes Street between Ashbury and Masonic. Lowell remained there for 50 years as the city's college preparatory high school. In 1952, the school sought a new location near Lake Merced and moved there (its present address) in 1962.

=== 1963 and after ===
Until 1988, the Lowell mascot was the Indian. In 1988, School Superintendent Ramon Cortines ordered that the name be changed to something less offensive. Lowell was selected as one of the 44 San Francisco Unified School District (SFUSD) schools considered for renaming in 2020. The school's selection, by a committee formed by the San Francisco Board of Education, was due to James Russell Lowell's documented racist views. Opponents have said that evidence for Lowell's anti-war beliefs and abolitionist views far outweigh the negatives, citing his lasting influence on Martin Luther King Jr. and within the NAACP.

Lowell was the first SFUSD school to be temporarily closed during the COVID-19 pandemic in San Francisco due to a report of respiratory illness by a student's family member in March 2020.

The 2021 documentary film Try Harder! profiled Lowell students as they went through the college admission process.

In April 2022, Principal Joe Ryan Dominguez submitted his letter of resignation, which would go into effect at the end of the school year.

== Campus ==
Situated on the West Side of the city, the school spans several blocks bounded by Eucalyptus Drive to the north, 25th Avenue to the east, Winston Drive to the south, and Lake Merced Boulevard and Meadowbrook Drive to the west. Lowell is located south of Parkmerced and the Parkside district, west of Stonestown Galleria, north of San Francisco State University, northeast of Lake Merced, and east of Lakeshore Elementary School, a public school, and St. Stephen School, a private K–8 school. Lowell is accessible via the San Francisco Municipal Railway (Muni) K, M, 18, 23, 28, 28R, 29, 57, and 58 lines.

Location of Lowell High School in San Francisco

The campus of what was called the New Lowell High School was opened in the early 1960s and replaced the old brick campus building on Masonic Street that is still used by the district for offices and an adult school. The "new" Lowell campus itself consists of a main three-story academic building with two extensions, the easternmost extension being a single-story science building, which was rebuilt and reopened on September 21, 2003, after the original building from the early 1960s was demolished because the labs were antiquated. The second extension consists of a single-story free-standing building that replaced temporary classrooms.

The original single-story visual and performing arts building is the westernmost extension of the main campus and remains with the 1,000-seat Carol Channing auditorium, named for the famous actress who was an alumna. The main entrance to the theater and the school is below street level on Eucalyptus Drive.

The campus includes a library, arts and music classrooms, six computer labs, a foreign language lab, an indoor gymnasium, men's and women's locker rooms, a dance studio, a weight room, an American football field, a soccer/multipurpose field and baseball batting cage, ten tennis courts, eight basketball courts, four volleyball courts, and a 1/4 mile (400 m) all-weather running track. The campus has two parking lots, one for students and the other for faculty. There is also a central courtyard inside the school.

There is an ROTC (Reserve Officers' Training Corp) facility built into the hill and located below the theater, accessed by a stairway down from the arts wing. The ROTC facility at one time included a rifle range where cadets practiced marksmanship with live ammunition.

== Academics and class structure ==
=== Academics ===
Lowell High School historically has test scores ranking among the Top 10 Public Schools in California, including Whitney High School and Oxford Academy. Lowell has been named a California Distinguished School seven times and a National Blue Ribbon School four times. Lowell was named a California Distinguished School in 1986, 1990, 1992, 1994, 2001, 2009, and 2015 (as a California Gold Ribbon School), as well as a National Blue Ribbon School in 1983, 1994, 2001, 2012, and 2019. As of 2024, Lowell is ranked 74th by U.S. News & World Report in its "Best High Schools in America" and 7th best in California. Lowell was also ranked 49th by Newsweek's America's Best High Schools 2012 list and 66th by Newsweek's 2013 list.

Students have the opportunity to choose from a large number of Advanced Placement courses. Lowell has a graduation rate of nearly 100%, and it is the largest feeder school to the University of California system, particularly to the Berkeley and Davis campuses.

=== Arena scheduling system ===
Lowell used an "arena" class scheduling system, up until 2020, in which students were given a time slot and directed to a website to choose their classes.

While scheduling classes for the 2006 spring semester, one of the students who had volunteered to assist the running of arena was caught abusing the scheduling system to use early scheduling privileges, granted to volunteers by the administration, to let friends schedule before others. Five of six department chairs and dozens of teachers at Lowell called to eliminate arena scheduling and to replace it with computerized scheduling used in all other SFUSD schools. Critics characterized arena scheduling as an antiquated and inefficient system, and creates weeks of unnecessary work for teachers and counselors.

Proponents of the arena argued that the system can prepare students for a similar selecting of courses in college.

After a student forum, committee meetings, several student petitions, and final deliberation by then-principal Paul Cheng and the administration, it was decided that arena would remain in place, with the modifications of the abolishment of early scheduling for Shield and Scroll and "mini arena," which allowed people with incomplete schedules another chance to complete them by opening up all the classes again with a few slots.

Under pressure from faculty and students, in 2013, the Lowell administration decided on an "online arena". In 2012, the Lowell administration began preliminary testing by requiring students to submit their proposed classes for the next school year through an online form, designed and maintained by a few students from the computer programming classes.

During the pandemic, Lowell's arena system was finally terminated and has remained that way since.

== Admissions ==
Lowell is the only high school in the San Francisco Unified School District that was permitted to admit only students who met special admission requirements. The Lowell admission process was competitive and based on a combination of standardized test scores, GPA, a writing sample, and extracurricular activities.

=== San Francisco NAACP v. San Francisco Unified School District (1980s) ===
In 1983, the SFUSD attempted to ensure racial desegregation at Lowell and other schools by implementing a race-based admissions policy as a result of San Francisco NAACP v. San Francisco Unified School District and the 1983 Consent Decree settlement.

The demographics began to disproportionately impact Chinese Americans in the 80s and 90s. As a result of this policy, effective in 1985, Chinese-American freshman applicants needed to score 62 out of a possible total of 69 eligibility points; Caucasian and other East Asian candidates needed only 58 points, and others needed fewer points.

=== Ho v. San Francisco Unified School District (1990s) ===
In 1994, a group of Chinese-American community activists organized a lawsuit to challenge the 1983 Consent Decree race-based admissions policies used by SFUSD for its public schools. The lawsuit was led by Lowell alum Lee Cheng. In 1999, both parties agreed to a settlement that modified the 1983 Consent Decree to create a new "diversity index" system which substituted race as a factor for admissions with a variety of factors such as socioeconomic background, mother's educational level, academic achievement, language spoken at home, and English Learner Status.

Critics of the diversity index created by Ho v. San Francisco Unified School District point out that many schools, including Lowell, have become even less racially diverse since it was enacted.

On November 15, 2005, the United States District Court for the Northern District of California denied a request to extend the Consent Decree, which was set to expire on December 31, 2005, after it had been extended once before to December 31, 2002. The ruling claimed "since the settlement of the Ho litigation [resulting in the institution of the "diversity index"], the consent decree has proven to be ineffective, if not counterproductive, in achieving diversity in San Francisco public schools" by making schools more racially segregated.

=== Lottery-based admissions ===
On October 20, 2020, the Board of Education voted unanimously to base 2021 freshman admittance to Lowell on a lottery rather than academic performance. Like other high schools in the district with lottery systems, priority would be given to applicants from census tracts with lower test scores, those with siblings at the school, and those who attended Willie L. Brown Jr. Middle School. On February 9, 2021, the Board, in a 5–2 vote, made that change to a lottery-based system permanent, citing "pervasive systemic racism" and the school's lack of diversity as reasons. Christine Linnenbach and Lee Cheng, attorneys and Lowell alumni (class of 1989), founded the Friends of Lowell Foundation to contest the policy. On March 8, Linnenbach filed a Cure and Correct letter challenging the Board of Education's adoption of lottery admissions.

The SFUSD did not rescind the vote, and the Friends of Lowell Foundation, Lowell Alumni Association, SF Taxpayers Association, and the Asian American Legal Foundation filed a complaint in the San Francisco Superior Court alleging that the SFUSD had violated the Ralph M. Brown Act when the Board of Education adopted lottery admissions. The school board had voted to make lottery admissions permanent; however, in November, Judge Ethan P. Schulman granted the petition challenging lawfulness of the adoption of lottery admissions and overturned that vote. The next month, the school board voted to extend the lottery system for one year, through 2022.

During the 2021–22 school year, the first in which the lottery system was in effect, 24% of freshmen students reported D or F grades, compared to 8% of freshmen from the previous academic year, which then-principal Dominguez attributed partly to the aftereffects of the COVID-19 pandemic. Constituents petitioned for a recall election against three School Board Commissioners on February 15, 2022, who were ousted by voters in a landslide. Their replacements were named by Mayor London Breed. On June 22, despite SFUSD Superintendent Vincent Matthews recommending an extension of the lottery system, the Board opted to restore merit-based admissions for the 2023–24 school year in a 4–3 vote.

=== Current application process ===
After reverting to a merit-based system, the old admissions process using a bespoke entrance exam was considered outdated and was ruled incompatible with the California education codes. Starting in January 2025, the district decided to refer to a student's grade point average and standardized test scores (the district uses STAR exams).

== Demographics ==
2021–2022, a survey of 2,652 students.

Students demographics
| Asian | White | Hispanic or Latino | Filipino | Two or more races | African American | Pacific Islander | American Indian or Alaska Native | Not reported |
|---|---|---|---|---|---|---|---|---|
| 1,288 | 469 | 373 | 171 | 171 | 50 | 10 | 6 | 114 |
| 48.6% | 17.7% | 14.1% | 6.4% | 6.4% | 1.9% | 0.4% | 0.2% | 4.3% |

2008–2009 faculty demographics:

- 147 certified staff; 49.6% male, 50.4% female.

Certificated staff demographics
| Latino | White | African-American | Chinese | Japanese | Korean | American Indian | Filipino | Other non-White | Declined to state |
|---|---|---|---|---|---|---|---|---|---|
| 8.1% | 56.4% | 2.0% | 13.6% | 3.4% | 0.6% | 0.0% | 2.7% | 4.0% | 8.8% |

== Student activities ==
=== Mock Trial ===
The Mock Trial team represented San Francisco County at the State Competitions in 2002, 2003, 2004, 2007, 2012, 2014, and 2016. In 2007, 2012, and 2014; they finished in the top ten at the State Finals. In 2014, the Lowell High School Mock Trial team placed 6th at the Empire Mock Trial San Francisco International Competition and in both 2015 and 2017, they won 1st place, beating out 21 teams.

=== Lowell Forensic Society ===
The Lowell Forensic Society, founded in 1892, is one of the oldest high school speech and debate teams in the nation and the largest student organization on campus, with over 200 members. The team travels regularly to prestigious national invitationals, including Harvard, UC Berkeley, Stanford, CSU Long Beach, and the Tournament of Champions in Kentucky. Lowell Forensics has also competed in the National Speech and Debate Tournament under the National Forensic League for 40 years.

=== The Lowell ===
The student-run publication, The Lowell, has won the CSPA Gold and Silver Crown awards, the NSPA Pacemaker (1993, 2000, 2003, 2006, 2012) and the Northern California Society for Professional Journalists' James Madison Award, in recognition of their 2006–2007 school year battle to protect free speech. The Lowell received the All-American ranking, with five marks of distinction, from the NSPA, the highest award.

=== CardinalBotics ===
The Lowell Robotics team, CardinalBotics, which first competed in 2012, is a FIRST Robotics Competition (FRC) team. In both 2021 and 2022, they won the Chairman's Award (now FIRST Impact Award), the most prestigious award in FRC, for promoting STEM among local youth and supporting the San Francisco Bay Area robotics community. CardinalBotics were regional finalists in 2013, 2018, and 2019. The team also won the Rookie All Star Award in 2012, the Judges Award in 2014, the Regional Engineering Inspiration Award in 2014, 2016, 2024, and 2026, the Game Design Challenge Finalist award in 2021, along with two Gracious Professionalism Awards in 2023 and one in 2026. In 2013, the team's founder won the FIRST Dean's List Award on the National Level, and in 2021 another member won the FIRST Dean's List Finalist Award. CardinalBotics attempts to encourage more students, especially women and minority students, to pursue STEM college majors and careers. The team also supports local LGBTQ youth through events such as their pride month t-shirt fundraiser.

=== Junior Reserve Officer Training Corps (JROTC) ===
Lowell JROTC indoor review in May 2005.

Lowell has an Army Junior Reserve Officers' Training Corps battalion consisting Battalion Commander, Battalion Executive Officer, Command Sergeant Major, 11 Staff Members, and Company Leadership. Lowell High JROTC consists of an additional thirteen special competition units (Drum Corps, Exhibition Drill Team, Flag Drill Team, Color Guard, Drill Platoon, Brigade Best Squad, Lowell Raider Challenge Team, Academic Bowl, Leadership Bowl, Cyber Patriot Team, Robotics Team, Orienteering Team, and Drones Team.

The Lowell Cadet Corps was founded in 1882 and later became known as Lowell Army JROTC when it adopted the national JROTC curriculum. A photo of the Lowell Battalion's former rifle range, now converted into a classroom and indoor drill facility, was featured in the Army JROTC Cadet Reference Second Edition. William "Bill" Hewlett was the Lowell Army JROTC Battalion Commander in the 1929–1930 school year.

Every fall, the Lowell Drill Platoon, Color Guard, Best Guidon Bearer, and Brigade Best Squad compete in the Annual Fall Drill Competition. In addition, every spring, Lowell's Exhibition Drill Teams, Flag Drill Teams, and Drum Corps participate in the Spring Drill Competition. The Lowell Raider Challenge Team also competes in the San Francisco JROTC Brigade Raider Challenge, which consists of a physical fitness test, first aid obstacle course, land navigation, and a three kilometer run in addition to the National Raider Challenge hosted in Fort Knox, Kentucky. The Robotics team competes all across California and the rest of the nation. Academic and Leadership Bowl competes in two online competitions over the school year and a national competition in June in Washington, D.C. Lowell JROTC also has an Archery Team that competes nationally and the San Francisco Brigade Archery League. Lowell JROTC Drones competes within California and on the national level.

Those who join JROTC will not be recruited into the army. The program offers leadership and team working opportunities through lessons related to first aid, money management, problem solving, and map reading. The program's motto is "to motivate young people to be better citizens."

=== Athletics ===
Lowell has competitive football, cross-country, soccer, tennis, volleyball, basketball, wrestling, badminton, dragonboat, softball, swimming, track and field, fencing, flag football, golf, cheerleading, and baseball teams.

In 2004, Lowell's Boys Varsity Basketball team won its first AAA Championship since 1952. Following a runner-up finish in 2005, the 2006 squad went undefeated in league play and finished with a 30–3 record and a city championship. The 2007 squad also won the championships, while the 2008 squad finished high in the playoffs. The 2009 team once again won the 2009 AAA championships over Lincoln. The basketball, soccer, and football teams engage in an annual rivalry with Washington High School in a game commonly known to those in the city as the "Battle of the Birds" game, named after the teams' cardinal and eagle mascots.

Lowell's Varsity Baseball team, won eight of ten championships from 1994 to 2004 while posting a regular season record of 185 wins and only 11 losses

In 2004, Lowell's track and field and cross-country teams won the city championship in all four divisions for the seventh year in a row. The cross country team recently swept all three divisions at the city finals in Golden Gate Park, marking Lowell's 26th overall championship win in a row.

Lowell's Girls' Varsity Volleyball team has dominated the sport since its creation with the most city championships amongst other San Francisco public schools, and from November 1996 to November 2008, went on a record streak of 13 consecutive volleyball city championships. The girls' junior varsity volleyball team also owns 15 of the 18 city titles (as of November 2010). In November 2019, the girls' varsity volleyball team won the CIF State Division 3 Championship.

As of 2018, Lowell's Varsity Girls' Soccer has won the AAA Championship title for the past 21 years in a row.

== See also ==
- San Francisco County high schools
