= Steve Phillips (writer) =

American writer and activist

Steve Phillips is an American social critic, attorney and political activist. He is the founder of Democracy in Color, a multimedia platform on race and politics, and the host of Democracy in Color with Steve Phillips, a color-conscious political podcast.

Phillips is a New York Times bestselling author of three books on race and politics in the United States. He is also a regular columnist for The Nation and The Guardian, and has published opinion pieces in The New York Times. He has appeared on multiple national radio and television networks, including CNN, MSNBC, NBC, and C-SPAN. Phillips currently splits his time between San Francisco and Washington, D.C.

== Early life and education ==
Phillips was born and raised in Cleveland Heights, Ohio. He is a graduate of Stanford University and University of California College of the Law, San Francisco.

== Career ==
=== San Francisco Board of Education ===
In 1992, at the age of 28, he became the youngest person ever elected to public office in San Francisco when he won a seat on the San Francisco Board of Education. He went on to serve as president of the Board of Education.

=== Democracy in Color ===
Democracy in Color is a political media organization focused on political strategy and analysis at the intersection of race and politics. Phillips founded Democracy in Color in 2016, and is the host of the Democracy in Color with Steve Phillips podcast.

In July 2016, Democracy in Color organized the first-ever panel on women of color in politics at that year's Democratic National Convention. In January 2017, Democracy in Color hosted the only Democratic National Committee Chair candidates forum focused on race and diversity.

=== Democratic Party audit ===
In 2014, Phillips co-authored the first-ever audit of Democratic Party spending. He was named one of “America’s Top 50 Influencers” by Campaigns and Elections magazine.

== Books ==
Brown Is The New White

Brown Is the New White: How the Demographic Revolution Has Created a New American Majority made the New York Times bestseller list in March 2016 and Washington Post bestseller list in February 2016.

How We Win the Civil War

How We Win the Civil War: Securing a Multiracial Democracy and Ending White Supremacy for Good was published in October 2022 from New Press. It was a Porchlight Books bestseller.

Are White Men Smarter Than Everybody Else?

Are White Men Smarter Than Everybody Else?: Playing Offense in the Fight for Racial Justice in America was published in April 2026 from New Press. In the book, Phillips introduces a concept that he dubs "Straight White American Male Preference" or S.W.A.M.P.

== Personal life ==
Phillips was married to the late social justice philanthropist Susan Sandler.

In 2008, Phillips began competing in marathons in San Francisco, and has completed 22 of those runs.
