= Mack Burton =

American gridiron football player (1939–2017)

Profile
- Positions: Wide receiver, Defensive back

Personal information
- Born: c. 1939; Franklinton, Louisiana, U.S.
- Died: May 16, 2017 (aged 77–78); San Francisco, California, U.S.
- Listed height: 6 ft 2 in (1.88 m)
- Listed weight: 190 lb (86 kg)

Career information
- High school: George Washington (San Francisco, California)
- College: San Jose State
- NFL draft: 1962: 5th round, 57th overall pick
- AFL draft: 1962: 4th round, 32nd overall pick

Career history
- 1962–1966: BC Lions

Awards and highlights
- Grey Cup champion (1964)

Nathaniel "Mack" Burton (born c. 1939 – May 16, 2017) was an American professional football player who played for the BC Lions. He won the Grey Cup with them in 1964. He played college football at the San Jose State University. Burton was inducted into the San Jose State University Sports Hall of Fame. Burton was selected 57th overall in the fifth round of the 1962 NFL draft by the Chicago Bears, but did not play in the league.
