= Mark Sanchez (politician) =

American politician

Mark Sanchez is an American politician in San Francisco, California. He was on the San Francisco Board of Education from 2001 to 2009, and served as president of the board from 2007 to 2009. Sanchez lost a 2008 election for the San Francisco Board of Supervisors in District 9. He was again elected to the San Francisco Board of Education in 2016. He was elected President of the Board in 2020, having been vice president since 2018.

== Political career ==
=== San Francisco Board of Education ===
Sanchez was a long-time teacher in San Francisco. He founded Teachers for Change and Teachers for Social Justice before running for the Board of Education in 2000. In 2000, he became the first Green Party member and the second openly-gay Commissioner on the Board of Education.

Sanchez represented the opposition to then-Superintendent Arlene Ackerman. The San Francisco Chronicle blamed Sanchez in part for the tense relationship the Board had with the superintendent:

What (Ackerman) doesn't need is sniping and second-guessing from elected officials whose job is to set broad policies, not micromanage the superintendent's daily conduct. Tensions between school board members and superintendents come with the territory. But in San Francisco, those tensions had gone far beyond the limits of acceptability. Three board members in particular—Eric Mar, Sarah Lipson and Mark Sanchez—need to start working with Ackerman, not fighting with her virtually on a daily basis.

At a September 2003 meeting of the Board of Education, Sanchez was among "three board members with whom Ackerman has locked horns said they remain steadfast in their objections to her management of the district, which they characterize as autocratic and unyielding to differing views." Ackerman resigned in 2005. Reported the San Francisco Chronicle, "Mayor Newsom said he was saddened but not surprised by Ackerman's resignation considering the ongoing bickering that has gone on between her and a faction of the school board. He said it was a shame to be losing the architect of the improvements within city schools."

In January, 2007, Mark Sanchez was unanimously elected as the President of the Board of Education. His tenure as president included the hiring of new SFUSD Superintendent Carlos Garcia, the shortening of the Board of Education's regular meetings, the debate over San Francisco's popular JROTC program and a resolution for Lennar to halt construction in Hunters Point Naval Shipyard because of health concerns.

In 2003, commissioners Sanchez and Mar sponsored an anti-war resolution. "The original resolution called for promoting a district-wide anti-war rally and creating a curriculum culled from the resources of anti-war groups to be used from kindergarten on up." However, other board members objected to the resolution, calling it one-sided and for taking students out of school to participate in the rally. "The proposal failed but a watered-down version that passed the board called for a day of on-campus public discussion about the possibility of a war in Iraq.".

==== JROTC controversy ====
In 2006, the Board of Education voted to eliminate its Junior Reserve Officers' Training Corps program as an anti-war statement. Commissioners Sanchez, Mar, Kelly, and Lipson voted to eliminate the program, with Commissioners Jill Wynns and Norman Yee voting for keeping the 120-year-old program. Commissioner Eddie Chin was absent. "Opponents said the armed forces should have no place in public schools, and the military's discriminatory stance on gays makes the presence of JROTC unacceptable." One supporter of the program argued that the program is the only place the kids feel safe. AsianWeek magazine criticized the schoolboard for closing down the Junior Reserve Officers' Training Corps in San Francisco high schools: "Supporters of JROTC acknowledge problems with the U.S. military and gays, but say Mar and (Norman) Yee are discounting the tremendous benefit JROTC has provided to minorities and low-income students."

In December 2007, during Sanchez' presidency, the Board voted 5–2 to postpone the elimination of JROTC because a replacement program had not been created. Sánchez and Mar were the only commissioners to vote for immediate elimination. In June, 2008 the board discontinued the awarding of physical education credit due to the threat of a lawsuit.

In 2008, San Francisco voters overruled the Board of Education and passed Proposition V, which urged the San Francisco Board of Education to reverse its elimination of the JROTC program. The proposition passed 55 to 45 percent.

==== Washington mural controversy ====
In June 2019 Sanchez voted with the rest of the board to paint over the murals in George Washington High School, which had been controversial since 1960s due to their depiction of slavery and a dead Native American. Sanchez declared that "this is reparations", and later added that simply concealing the murals wasn't an option because it would “allow for the possibility of them being uncovered in the future.” The cost was estimated at $600,000 to $875,000. Historian Robin Kelley has stated that in using the word "reparations", Mark Sanchez "not only perverts the concept of reparations" but also fails to see that the funds for the high cost of destruction "could have been invested in arts education or an anti-racist curriculum".

After a public outcry, widely covered in national press, the board voted 4–3 to conceal instead of destroying the murals. Sanchez (together with Gabriela Lopez and Alisson Collins) was one of the commissioners who did not reverse their vote to destroy the art work. The school's Alumni association sued the board for violation California Environmental Quality Act. On July 27, 2021, superior court judge Anne-Christine Massullo ruled in favor of the alumni association, preventing the school from covering the mural. Judge Massullo wrote: "Neutral administrative procedures must be applied without regard to political interests."

==== School renaming controversy ====
In 2018, the Board created a task force to study the names of schools within the SFUSD in the wake of Charlottesville car attack. The 12-person committee, chaired by a first grade teacher and activist Jeremiah Jeffries, was assembled in 2020 and recommended 44 names that met the criteria of being associated with the European colonization of the Americas, slavery in the United States, exploitation, racism, or abuse for renaming. Early estimates priced the entire process to at least US$1,000,000. By a 6 to 1 vote on January 26, 2021, the Board approved the entire list, which included all schools named after U.S. presidents and founding fathers, and asked schools to submit replacement names up until April 2021. Commissioner Mark Sanchez, stated that although he did not anticipate all 44 schools to be renamed, those on the list "should be prepared." The decision drew criticism in the national press and was covered internationally.

Critics called the effort ill-timed, amateurish and wasteful—citing factual errors, the absence of historians on the committee, inadequate amount of public input, and the US$1,000,000 price tag during a budget deficit estimated to be at around US$75,000,000 as primary issues. Mayor London Breed, State Senator Scott Wiener, and Supervisor Hillary Ronen called for a refocusing on school re-openings during the COVID-19 pandemic in the San Francisco Bay Area rather than the renaming effort. The San Francisco Chronicle editorialized, "While most of the country is rightly engaged in removing racist monuments to the Confederacy, only in San Francisco must the heroes of the Union be toppled: The board’s list includes Lincoln, Gen. William Tecumseh Sherman, and the abolitionist poet and editor James Russell Lowell."

Commentators have expressed puzzlement over how the committee compiled the list. The San Francisco Chronicle noted that schools named after Cesar Chavez, who called undocumented workers "wetback" and other pejoratives, and Malcolm X, who had worked as a pimp, were excluded from renaming. On the other hand, schools named after the mythical El Dorado and California senator Dianne Feinstein were included. The latter was included because a stolen Confederate flag from a historic exhibit outside City Hall was initially replaced by the Parks Department in 1984, while Feinstein was mayor of San Francisco, before she ordered the flag to be removed permanently.

Factual historical errors endorsed by the Board included: confusing the name of the Alamo elementary school with the battle in Texas rather than the Spanish word for poplar tree; mistaking a revolutionary war battle Paul Revere participated in with a raid against the Penobscot tribe; holding the local philanthropist James Lick responsible for an objectionable monument, the Early Days statue, commissioned more than a decade after his death; mistaking the name of the Sanchez school with that of a conquistador instead of an early mayor of San Francisco. Many other examples were cited as lacking in nuance or proper historical context, such as questioning whether the abolitionist poet James Russell Lowell believed firmly in the right of black people to vote. Another controversial choice was the literary figure Robert Louis Stevenson for a 19th-century poem, from his book A Child's Garden of Verses, where he used the word "eskimo", and rhymed the word "me" with "Japanee".

In addition to those named after historical figures, the renaming list included schools named after their own historical neighborhoods, such as Presidio and Mission, on the ground that these names were associated with colonization by Spain. Columnist Carl Nolte of the San Francisco Chronicle opined that by that logic, the city itself should be renamed, since it was christened by Spanish missionaries for a Roman Catholic priest, which “clearly fits the guidelines for a new name."

=== Campaign for San Francisco Board of Supervisor ===
In 2008, Sanchez ran to replace Tom Ammiano as supervisor of District 9. He received the endorsement of the San Francisco Chronicle and the Bay Area Reporter.

David Campos came in first with 36%. Sanchez placed second with 29%.

== Principal career ==
=== Principal of Horace Mann Middle School ===
In April 2009, Sanchez left his teaching job at a charter school in Redwood City, California to begin shadowing principals in San Francisco to learn more about the job. In May 2009, the San Francisco school board waived its own rules and offered Sanchez a one-year interim position as principal of Horace Mann Middle School. In order to give Sanchez the position, board members suspended a 30-year-old policy that prohibited the district from hiring or contracting with former board members within two years of the end of their term.

In March 2010, Horace Mann Middle School was put on California's 5% lowest-achieving schools list. Schools on the list were required to be closed, converted to charter schools, or subjected to a complete staff overhaul, including the principal. However, Sanchez was not replaced because regulations allow schools to keep principals who have been on the job two years or less.

In July 2010, Horace Mann Middle School appeared on the state Board of Education's list of 1,000 schools deemed so bad that parents have the right to transfer their children to a better school in their district or any other district.

In August 2010, a charter high school, Metropolitan Arts and Technology, began sharing the Horace Mann Middle School campus. The school was built to hold some 600 students, but enrollment in Horace Mann Middle School had dwindled to 330. Some middle school parents were uneasy about their children sharing the campus with older high school students.

In February 2011, the school district announced that Buena Vista, an elementary school with a well-regarded Spanish immersion program, would merge with Horace Mann to form a kindergarten through eight-grade school called Buena Vista Horace Mann. "We wanted to expand into a K–8," Sanchez told Mission Local. "There have been massive surveys of kids that show that kids feel safer in them. And they do better in testing." Maria Dehghan succeeded Sanchez as the principal of the new school at the beginning of the 2011–12 school year in August.

=== Principal of Cleveland Elementary School ===
In August 2011, Sanchez became principal of Cleveland Elementary School in Excelsior District, San Francisco.
