= San Francisco Board of Education =

School board for San Francisco

School board overview
- Formed: 1851
- Jurisdiction: San Francisco Unified School District
- Headquarters: 555 Franklin Street San Francisco, CA, 94102
- School board executive: Phil Kim, President
- Website: www.sfusd.edu/about/board-of-education

The San Francisco Board of Education is the school board for the City and County of San Francisco. It is composed of seven Commissioners, elected by voters across the city to serve 4-year terms. It is subject to local, and state law, and federal laws since the district receives federal funding. The board determines policy for all the K-12 public schools in the San Francisco Unified School District. The composition of the board is determined by the Charter of San Francisco, making the board and the school district one of the only school districts in the state regulated by a city charter, a legacy of when cities were responsible for schooling in California.

== Responsibilities ==
The board's responsibilities include:

- Establishing educational goals and standards
- Approving curriculum
- Setting the district budget, which is independent of the city's budget
- Confirming appointment of all personnel
- Approving purchases of equipment, supplies, services, leases, renovation, construction, and union contracts
- Appointing a superintendent of schools to manage the day-to-day administration of the district

== Pay ==
As of 2021, board members are paid around $6,000 a year.

== Early history ==
=== Founding ===
In October 1849, John C. Pelton opened a school in a Baptist church in San Francisco. It was funded by voluntary donations and tuition, with poor children able to attend for free. In 1850, the city council adopted an ordinance making it free public school for all children, a first in California. In September 1851, the school was reorganized under an ordinance providing for a San Francisco Board of Education and a superintendent.

=== Segregating students of East Asian descent ===
The Wasp, December 15, 1906

With Japanese immigration to the United States increasing in the late 1800s and early 1900s, the board ordered Japanese American and Korean American students attending public schools to transfer to the Oriental Public School, which serviced Chinese students, in 1905. That action drew ire from the Empire of Japan and forced Theodore Roosevelt to intervene, who was wary of Japan's recent victory in the Russo-Japanese War. After Roosevelt realized that this was a matter of immigration and that the ordinance affected only 93 students, he brokered the Gentlemen's Agreement of 1907, whereby the students would be allowed into the schools and the Japanese government would stop issuing passports for laborers to the United States, after initially failing to persuade the board to rescind their decision.

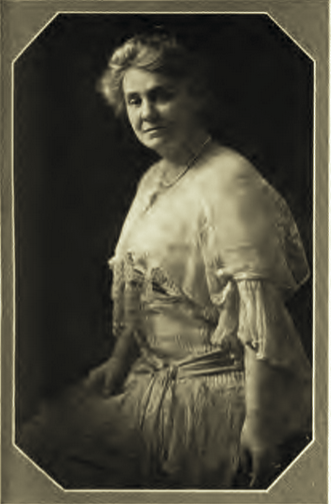
Helen P. Sanborn was elected president of the board in 1920.

In the 1920s, the school was renamed Commodore Stockton School and students were allowed to attend nearby schools as the student population became too large. The board officially rescinded the policy in 2017 as a symbolic gesture.

=== Transition from appointed to elected members ===
For decades up to 1971, the mayor appointed school board members, who were then confirmed by voters in the next election. In November 1971, voters approved Proposition S, which made Board of Education members elected directly by voters. The push came as backlash against the school board's efforts to use busing desegregate schools.

== Modern history ==
=== 2000–2006: Arlene Ackerman era ===
Arlene Ackerman began her tenure as the superintendent of SFUSD on August 1, 2000, succeeding Superintendent Bill Rojas. Under her tenure, Ackerman overhauled the district's facilities department, which was misappropriating city funds. Further investigations led to financial settlements for the district by companies who were defrauding them and the federal government, garnering the district more than $45 million. Her fiscal management garnered praise from even her critics.

Ackerman faced opposition from the board's liberal members. Mark Sanchez and Sarah Lipson were both members of the Green Party and, along with Eric Mar, were allied with the new liberal majority on the San Francisco Board of Supervisors. Ackerman was supported by the San Francisco Parent Teacher Association. The San Francisco Chronicle editorialized in support of Ackerman and opined that the "Three board members in particular—Eric Mar, Sarah Lipson and Mark Sanchez—need to start working with Ackerman, not fighting with her virtually on a daily basis." Commissioners Eddie Chin, Dan Kelly, and Jill Wynns supported Ackerman. Norman Yee, who was elected in 2004, was considered the swing vote.

Toward the end of her tenure, Ackerman was approved a raise, which included a salary of $250,000 and a $375,000 severance package among other benefits, by a 4 to 3 vote during a projected budget shortfall of $22 million which closed four schools. In June 2005, Supervisor Matt Gonzalez sued Ackerman with law partner Whitney Leigh, claiming that the raise was illegal as she had not given the public at least 24-hour prior to the raise in accordance with state law. SFUSD counsel David Campos argued that Ackerman was exempt as she serves as a district superintendent and perform duties as a county superintendent. Ackerman stated that the cost of her legal defense would have cost the SFUSD more than her severance package was worth.

The board unanimously invoked the "compatibility clause" in Ackerman's contract in September 2005, mutually agreeing to Ackerman's resignation within the next year. Ackerman officially quit in June 2006. Commissioner Daniel P. Kelly, an ally of Ackerman's, said that she was "being forced out" due to the "intolerable" infighting. Her opponents, Lipson and Mar, expressed relief over her resignation. Gwen Chan was appointed interim superintendent in February 2006, becoming the district's first Chinese American superintendent.

=== 2006–2019 ===
The board voted 6–1 in June 2007 to hire Carlos Garcia as the new superintendent, signing a contract that was less costly than Ackerman's. Commissioner Kim-Shree Maufas dissenting, citing a need for more time to consider his appointment.

The board voted unanimously to hire Vincent Matthews as the new superintendent in April 2017.

==== JROTC ====
In November 2006, the board voted 4–2 to eliminate the JROTC program altogether in the entire city within two years, stating that "armed forces should have no place in public schools, and the military's discriminatory stance on gays makes the presence of JROTC unacceptable."

In December 2007, the board decided to continue JROTC for one more year so the JROTC task force could continue its search for a replacement program without punishing current JROTC students. A non-binding measure called Proposition V was placed on the November 4, 2008 general ballot in San Francisco that supported the reinstatement of the JROTC program in the City. The proposition passed. In May 2009, the school board voted to reinstate the program. In June 2009, the San Francisco School board voted 4 to 3 in favor of reinstating physical education credit for students enrolled in JROTC.

==== Programs ====
In March 2019, the board unanimously voted to expand the pilot program at Buena Vista Horace Mann K-8 Community School that housed that school's homeless families to include eligibility across the school district. The program up until that point suffered from lack of use, with the shelter averaging less than two families per night out of a 20 family capacity.

==== Life of Washington mural destruction attempt ====
In September 2016, board president Matt Haney began the effort to remove the Life of Washington mural by Victor Arnautoff at George Washington High School, citing objections to its depictions of slaves and a dead Native American. He also suggested that the school be renamed after a San Francisco native such as Maya Angelou, who is an alumna, because George Washington was a slave owner.

The mural had previously been the subject of controversy in the 1960s and 1970s when student activists demanded that it be taken down. In a compromise, the school board and the San Francisco Arts Commission hired Dewey Crumpler to paint a "response mural" at the school, which depicted the historical struggles of Black, Native, and Latin Americans.

In June 2019, the board unanimously voted to paint over the mural, with a provision that allowed the mural to be obfuscated instead if painting over it resulted in delays or other legal issues. After a national outcry, the board reversed its decision in August 2019 by voting 4 to 3 to instead cover the mural. Supporters of the removal say that the mural's imagery creates a hostile environment. Opponents argue that the imagery is subversive as Arnautoff, a communist, was critiquing the country's colonial past.

The high school's alumni association sued the school district in October 2019, contending that it violated California Environmental Quality Act by not conducting an environmental impact report. In July 2021, superior court judge Anne-Christine Massullo agreed that the district did not follow state environmental regulations, including the study of alternatives prior to a decision. In her order blocking the board from covering the mural, she emphasized the adherence to the rule of law over any "parochial political agendas".

=== 2020–present: COVID-19 era ===
==== School renaming attempt ====
In 2018, the board created a task force to study the names of schools within the SFUSD in the wake of Charlottesville car attack. The 12-person committee, chaired by a first grade teacher and activist Jeremiah Jeffries, was assembled in 2020 and recommended 44 names that met the criteria of being associated with the European colonization of the Americas, slavery in the United States, exploitation, racism, or abuse for renaming. Early estimates priced the entire process to at least US$1,000,000. By a 6 to 1 vote on January 26, 2021, the board approved the entire list, which included all schools named after U.S. presidents with the exception of Grover Cleveland, and asked schools to submit replacement names up until April 2021. Commissioner Mark Sanchez, stated that although he did not anticipate all 44 schools to be renamed, those on the list "should be prepared." The decision drew criticism in the national press and was covered internationally.

The schools selected for renaming were more than a third of the city's 125 schools: Abraham Lincoln High School, Alamo Elementary, Alvarado Elementary, Balboa High School, Bryant Elementary, Clarendon Elementary, Claire Lilienthal (both campuses), Commodore Sloat Elementary, Daniel Webster Elementary, Dianne Feinstein Elementary, El Dorado Elementary, Everett Middle school, Francis Scott Key Elementary, Frank McCoppin Elementary, Garfield Elementary, George Washington High School, Grattan Elementary, Herbert Hoover Middle School, James Denman Middle School, James Lick Middle School, Jefferson Elementary, Jose Ortega Elementary, John Muir Elementary, Junipero Serra Elementary, Lawton Alternative K-8, Lowell High School, Marshal Elementary, McKinley Elementary, Mission High School, Monroe Elementary, Noriega EES, Presidio EES, Presidio Middle School, Sanchez Elementary, Sherman Elementary, Paul Revere K-8, Robert Louis Stevenson Elementary, Roosevelt Middle School, Sheridan Elementary, Stockton EES, Sutro Elementary, and Ulloa Elementary.

Critics called the renaming effort ill-timed, amateurish and wasteful—citing factual errors, the absence of historians on the committee, inadequate amount of public input, and the US$1,000,000 price tag during a budget deficit estimated to be at around US$75,000,000 as primary issues. Mayor London Breed, State Senator Scott Wiener, and Supervisor Hillary Ronen called for a refocusing on school re-openings during the COVID-19 pandemic in the San Francisco Bay Area rather than the renaming effort. The San Francisco Chronicle editorialized, "While most of the country is rightly engaged in removing racist monuments to the Confederacy, only in San Francisco must the heroes of the Union be toppled: The board's list includes Lincoln, Gen. William Tecumseh Sherman, and the abolitionist poet and editor James Russell Lowell."

Proponents of the renaming argued that it was necessary "given the country's reckoning with a racist past" and that students shouldn't attend schools named after slaveholders such as George Washington, racists like Adolph Sutro, or colonizers like Junípero Serra. Board President Gabriela López affirmed that the board can focus to "dismantle racist symbols and white supremacy culture...and other pressing matters" and saw the process as an opportunity to highlight individuals who are often not acknowledged within the school curriculum.

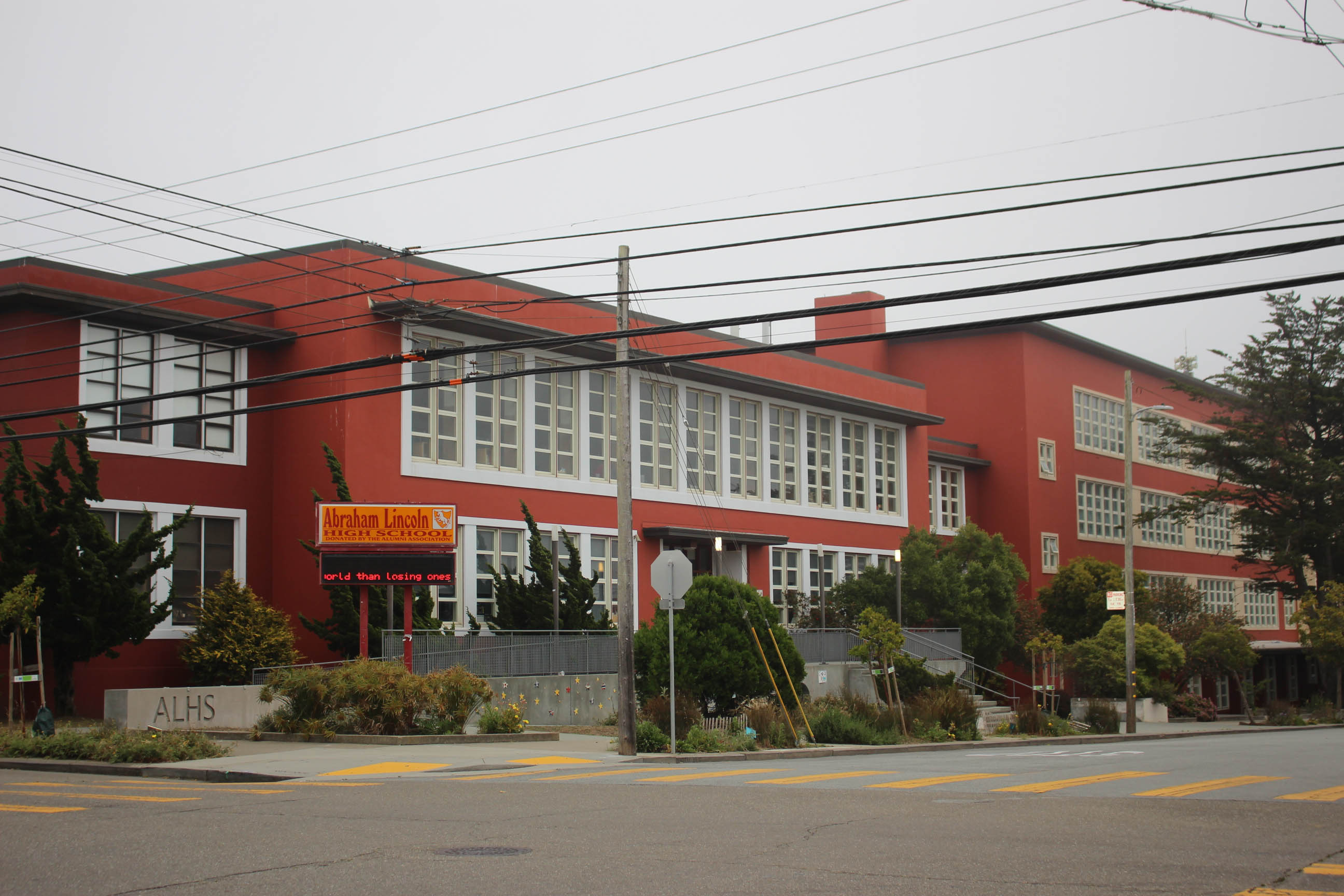
Abraham Lincoln High School was one of the 44 schools nominated for renaming.

Commentators have expressed puzzlement over how the committee compiled the list. The San Francisco Chronicle noted that schools named after Cesar Chavez, who called illegal immigrant workers "wetbacks" and other pejoratives, and Malcolm X, who had worked as a pimp, were excluded from renaming. On the other hand, schools named after the mythical El Dorado and U.S. Senator Dianne Feinstein were included. The latter was included because a stolen Confederate flag from a historic exhibit outside City Hall was initially replaced by the Parks Department in 1984, while Feinstein was mayor of San Francisco, before she ordered the flag to be removed permanently. Feinstein's predecessor, George Moscone, who had kept the flag during his own administration, was not included.

The most controversial school on the list was Abraham Lincoln High School, with members of the committee noting Lincoln's confirmation of the sentencing of 38 indigenous warriors condemned to death in Minnesota after the Dakota War of 1862 as a point of contention. Opponents have countered by stating that at the same time Lincoln pardoned 265 warriors, despite mounted pressure from a Republican-majority Congress, in "by far the largest act of executive clemency in American history", according to historian James McPherson. Historian Harold Holzer argued that Lincoln's stance on Indian affairs was considered progressive for the time. According to the video of its meeting, the renaming committee's internal discussion on Lincoln took only five seconds. President of the renaming committee, Jeremiah Jeffries, later added that Lincoln "did not show through policy or rhetoric that black lives ever mattered" to him "outside human capital". This assertion was refuted in Smithsonian magazine by pointing to Emancipation Proclamation, and numerous other historical documents.

Factual historical errors endorsed by the board included: confusing the name of the Alamo elementary school with the battle in Texas rather than the Spanish word for poplar tree; mistaking a revolutionary war battle Paul Revere participated in with a raid against the Penobscot tribe; holding the local philanthropist James Lick responsible for an objectionable monument, the Early Days statue, commissioned more than a decade after his death; mistaking the name of the Sanchez school with that of a conquistador instead of an early mayor of San Francisco. Many other examples were cited as lacking in nuance or proper historical context, such as questioning whether the abolitionist poet James Russell Lowell believed firmly in the right of black people to vote. Another controversial choice was the literary figure Robert Louis Stevenson for a 19th century poem, from his book A Child's Garden of Verses, where he used the word "eskimo", and rhymed the word "me" with "Japanee".

In addition to those named after historical figures, the renaming list included schools named after their own historical neighborhoods, such as Presidio and Mission, on the ground that these names were associated with colonization by Spain. Columnist Carl Nolte of the San Francisco Chronicle opined that by that logic, the city itself should be renamed, since it was christened by Spanish missionaries for a Roman Catholic priest, which "clearly fits the guidelines for a new name."

In an interview with The New Yorker, published on February 6, 2021, board president Gabriela López was asked if factual errors during the renaming process had made her "worried that maybe this was done in a slightly haphazard way?" López replied, "No". She stated that those involved in the process were "contributing through diverse perspectives and experiences that are often not included, and that we need to acknowledge."

===== Reversal of school renaming attempt =====
On Twitter February 21, 2021, board president Gabriela Lopez said "I acknowledge and take responsibility that mistakes were made in the renaming process," adding that the board would pursue a "more deliberative process moving forward, which includes engaging historians at nearby universities to help." Lopez added that the renaming committee had been indefinitely suspended, and said that the school board would devote its energy to getting students back to in-person learning.

The renaming effort was shelved by the board in February 2021 to prioritize reopening schools. In March 2021, the board faced a potential lawsuit from various attorneys, including Laurence Tribe, an alumnus of Lincoln High School. They alleged the board failed to adequately inform the public of the renaming decision, in accordance to the Brown Act, and asked the board to rescind the decision. The San Francisco superior court judge Ethan Schulman ruled that the board should do what the lawsuit requests or show why it should not be compelled to do so.

The board unanimously voted to reverse the vote to rename schools on April 6, 2021, citing the potentially high cost of litigation against the suit. In this second amended resolution no. 214-6A1, the board stated that the anticipated litigation would be "frivolous", and that the board wants to "avoid distraction and wasteful expenditure of public funds in frivolous litigation."

==== Ending Lowell High School's merit-based admissions policy ====
The board unanimously voted in October 2020 to switch Lowell High School's selective test-based admissions policy to a lottery based system for the 2020–2021 school year due to the district moving to a pass/fail system during the coronavirus pandemic. After a racist incident at Lowell, the board voted 5–2, with Kevine Boggess and Jenny Lam dissenting, in February 2021 to make the switch permanent. They cite the lack of diversity and "pervasive systemic racism" as driving factors for the change, in addition to state law preventing comprehensive high schools from using selective enrollment.

The decision was considered divisive. Reverend Amos C. Brown supported the switch, opining in the San Francisco Chronicle that "school leaders are failing to face up to and dismantle the elitist culture at Lowell, a public school." Commissioner Alison Collins stated that, "merit, meritocracy and especially meritocracy based on standardized testing...those are racist systems" and are the "antithesis of fair".

In March 2021, Harmeet Dhillon represented a group of Lowell community members and threatened to sue the board, calling the end of the testing-based admission system "an unconstitutional and illegal program designed to disenfranchise hardworking students". On April 23, 2021, a separate lawsuit was filed against the board, claiming that the board had violated California's Brown Act when it changed the school's admission policy without allowing enough time for public outreach and comment. On November 18, 2021, Superior Court Judge Ethan Schulman agreed with the plaintiffs and nullified the board's February 2021 decision to change the admission policy. The judge, however, "stopped short of requiring the district to reinstate competitive admission, leaving open the possibility the school board could take the same action after giving adequate notice to the public".

==== School reopening ====
In June 2020, Superintendent Vincent Matthews brought forth a proposition to hire a consultant to devise a plan to reopen the schools during the COVID-19 pandemic, during which the district's deficit roughly doubled from 2019's $22 million. Public comments, including from the president of the teachers' union, expressed concern about the chosen consulting group's previous relationship with charter schools. The board voted 4 to 2 (with 1 absence) to not hire the consultant, partly due to that connection and partly due to cost.

On February 3, 2021, San Francisco City Attorney Dennis Herrera announced that, on February 11, he will sue the Board of Education, SFUSD, and Superintendent Matthews for violating state law by not having a plan to "offer classroom-based instruction whenever possible". The lawsuit was the first of its kind, wherein a civil action is filed by a city against its school district over COVID-19 school closures, within the state of California. The suit is supported by Mayor London Breed, who has called on the board to focus on reopening rather than other matters, such as the renaming 44 SFUSD schools, during the pandemic. Both the board and Matthews have criticized the suit, calling it wasteful and inaccurate.

A plan to allow certain groups of students, primarily elementary school, to attend in-person teaching for a reduced amount of days per week at certain schools was unanimously signed on March 11, 2021. A San Francisco superior judge denied the request on March 25, 2021, citing developments between the ruling and the filing wherein the district approved of a plan to bring certain students back by April 12, therefore rendering the suit redundant.

==== Board complies with superintendent's demands ====
In March 2021, Superintendent Matthews announced his intent to retire in June 2021. He agreed to delay his retirement to the end of 2022 upon a deal with the board. The board voted 6 to 1 on April 20, 2021 to approve Superintendent Matthews's new contract. The contract's addendum obligated the commissioners to certain behavior—requiring them to adhere to the already written rules of conduct for board meetings (which includes acting with civility), to be prepared for public meetings, to introduce resolutions one week prior to a meeting, and to refrain from creating new programs or mandates unrelated to school reopening until the school district is fully back to in-person learning. Furthermore, the superintended received more power over the hiring and firing of senior staff and the determination of whether or not the board's resolutions are under their jurisdiction. Commissioner Kevine Boggess dissented, saying that the demands were unnecessary.

==== Alison Collins' tweets against Asian Americans ====
On December 4, 2016, prior to her assumption of office to the Board of Education in 2019, Alison Collins posted a series of derogatory and racially stereotyping tweets against Asian Americans. while alleging anti-Blackness and political inaction in the SFUSD Asian American population. Collins concluded the tweets by saying "Being a house n****r is still being a n****r. You're still considered 'the help.'" (note asterisks are in the original quote)

On March 19, 2021, supporters of an effort to recall Collins resurfaced the tweets by republicizing them. On March 20, 2021, Collins responded to the publicized tweets by writing an article on medium.com and commenting on the article on Twitter. She wrote that the words were taken out of context and apologized for the pain caused by her words.

By March 21, 2021, all of SFUSD's top 19 administrators, in addition to the Mayor of San Francisco London Breed, ten of the eleven San Francisco Board of Supervisors including Board of Supervisors President Shamann Walton, state legislators Scott Wiener, David Chiu, and Phil Ting, and Collins' fellow Commissioners Moliga and Lam, had condemned the publicized tweets and called for Collins's resignation. On March 22, 2021, the district's Superintendent Leadership team condemned Collins' "racist and hurtful language".

On March 23, 2021, at the regular board meeting, Collins apologized for the pain she may have caused people, but did not apologize to the Asian-American community. The response to the apology had not been good, as Selina Sun, President of the Mayor Edwin Lee Democratic Club stated, "Commissioner Collins' apology doesn't go far enough, frankly. It seeks to divide us further." A small number of people had come to Collins' defense, saying she has worked to implement policies on behalf of Asian and Pacific Islander communities.

On March 25, 2021, the board held a special meeting to discuss additional agenda items including a no-confidence vote for Collins. Authored by Commissioners Jenny Lam and Faauuga Moliga, the vote of no-confidence resolution (1) stated that Collins failed to accept responsibility for her words, (2) called for Collins to resign, and (3) called to remove Collins as vice president and from all board committees effective immediately if she did not resign. Up to the time of the meeting the board called for a vote to the resolution, in addition to not resigning, Collins still had not apologized to the Asian-American community, had not apologized for the tweets themselves, and had not admitted the tweets were racist. As a result, the board voted in favor of the resolution by a 5-to-2 vote, with only board vice president Collins and board president López dissenting. Collins was removed as vice-president of the Board of Education effective immediately after the board approved the vote on March 25, 2021. Faauuga Moliga was elected as vice-president of the board for the remainder of the 2021 term at the regular board meeting on April 20, 2021.

On March 31, 2021, Collins sued SFUSD and the five Board of Education members who voted against her for $87 million, citing distress and significant loss in reputation and income. She also sought an injunction to restore her vice president role and committee seats. Various legal experts from the San Francisco Bay Area (including UC Berkeley Law Dean Erwin Chemerinsky and Harvard Law Professor Laurence Tribe) expressed skepticism regarding the viability of the suit. On August 16, 2021, Federal Judge Haywood Gilliam, Jr. said that the lawsuit had no merit and dismissed the case.

==== Recall campaign ====
On February 20, 2021, parents Autumn Looijen and Siva Raj launched a recall campaign against Gabriela López, Alison Collins, and Faauuga Moliga over the board's inability to reopen schools. In February 2021 a market research firm found that 69% of public school parents polled were in favor of the recall campaign. The other four commissioners were ineligible for recall as they had just won their election in November 2020. The campaign began collecting signatures in April 2021. By the end of August 2021, the campaign had gathered more than 70,000 signatures to recall López and Collins, and more than 67,000 signatures to recall Moliga, exceeding the 51,325 signatures needed to trigger the recall. Several elected Democrats from San Francisco—including London Breed, Scott Wiener, Matt Haney, and Rafael Mandelman—endorsed the recall of at least one of the commissioners.

On February 15, 2022, San Francisco voters voted to remove all three commissioners with landslide results.

Ann Hsu, Lainie Motamedi, and Lisa Weissman-Ward were appointed by Mayor London Breed to replace the three removed commissioners for the rest of their terms.

==== Budget shortfall and potential state takeover ====
On September 15, 2021, the California Department of Education gave the SFUSD three months to approve a fiscal stabilization plan and address a $125 million deficit, about 10% of the budget. If the Board of Education failed to approve a plan, the state would partially take over the district. Even facing a deficit, the school board spent more money: it created new programs and incurred staff and legal costs around its decision to rename schools, change Lowell admissions, and cover the Life of Washington mural. State officials stated that the school board had taken no action for a year to address budget deficits. Former school board member Rachel Norton said, "…your responsibility as a board member, first and foremost, is the financial condition of the district. That is your job… It doesn't appear that this board has made the hard decisions."

With two weeks left until the December 15, 2021 deadline to approve budget cuts. Commissioners Mark Sanchez and Matt Alexander proposed a new plan different from Superintendent Vincent Matthews's proposal. The new plan would cut services, operations, and administration, and not cut classroom programs and staff. Commissioners Sanchez and Alexander claimed that SFUSD's central office was much bigger than other large school districts in California. The CEO of the state Fiscal Crisis & Management Assistance Team (which works with the state's school districts on financial stability) questioned the plan, saying: "Individual board members, unless they have a lot of district experience in budgeting, frankly don't know what they're doing." The state's appointed overseer also cautioned against making direct comparisons because of SFUSD's unique governance structure. The state-appointed overseer and Superintendent Matthews urged the board to approve the staff plan, balancing cuts across school sites and the central office. On December 14, one day before the deadline, the Board of Education approved the staff plan 6-1, with Commissioner Gabriela López in dissent.

==== New superintendent ====
In May 2022, the Board of Education selected Matt Wayne to replace outgoing Superintendent Vince Matthews. Wayne began the job on July 1, 2022.

== Organization ==
=== Members ===
Name	Year(s) in office	Notes
Mark Sanchez	2001–2009, 2017–	
Jenny Lam	2019–	Appointed by London Breed to take over Matt Haney's seat. Won 2019 Special Election to retain seat.
Matt Alexander	2021–	
Kevine Boggess	2021–	
Ann Hsu	2022–	Appointed by London Breed after 2022 recall election.
Lainie Motamedi	2022–	Appointed by London Breed after 2022 recall election.
Lisa Weissman-Ward	2022–	Appointed by London Breed after 2022 recall election.

=== Select former members ===
The Board of Education has been seen as a political stepping stone, in particular to the San Francisco Board of Supervisor. Numerous previous commissioners have gone on to serve as supervisors.

==== San Francisco Supervisors ====
- Shamann Walton (2015–2019)
- Matt Haney (2013–2019)
- Sandra Lee Fewer (2009–2017)
- Norman Yee (2005–2013)
- Jane Kim (2007–2011)
- Eric Mar (2001–2009)
- Leland Yee (1989–1997)
- Tom Ammiano (1991–1995)

==== Notable members ====
- Gabriela López (2019–2022)—youngest elected official in San Francisco at 27, recalled in 2022
- Alison Collins (2019–2022)—recalled in 2022
- Faauuga Moliga (2018–2022)—first Pacific Islander to serve in San Francisco, recalled in 2022
- Jill Wynns (1992–2017)—longest serving commissioner
- Frank Chong (1998–2002)—president of Santa Rosa Junior College
- Steve Phillips (1993–2001)—writer and political commentator
- Keith Jackson (1995–1998)—sentenced for his role in a racketeering conspiracy alongside Leland Yee

Name	Year(s) in office	Notes
Rachel Norton	2009–2021	
Emily M. Murase	2011–2019	
Hydra Mendoza-McDonnell	2007–2018	
Kim-Shree Maufas	2006–2014	
Eddie Chin	1998–2006	
Daniel P. Kelly	1990–2006	
Emilio Cruz	2001–2004	Appointed by Willie Brown to take over Mary Hernandez's seat.
Juanita Owens	1996–2000	

== Elections ==
=== November 6, 2018 election ===
The November 6, 2018 election for the Board of Education drew an unprecedented 19 candidates—the most in any board election in at least 20 years—in part because two sitting commissioners, Shamann Walton and Hydra Mendoza-McDonnell announced they would not seek re-election.

The winners were educator Alison Collins, teacher Gabriela López, and Faauuga Moliga, a behavioral therapist and the first Pacific Islander to hold a citywide office. All three were recalled in 2022.
