= Jill Wynns =

American politician

Jill Wynns is a former member of the San Francisco Board of Education. She served on the board from her initial election in 1992 until losing re-election in 2016. Her term was longer than any other board member.

== Biography ==
Jill Wynns was raised in and around New York City and its nearby rural areas in the 1950s and 1960s. She was admitted to the private Hofstra University after her junior year in high school. She spent one year in college in Sweden, then moved to San Francisco in 1969 after earning her BA in Humanities. She worked for 10 years in professional theater as a costume designer and costume shop manager. She is currently employed as a campaign executive (professional fundraiser) for the Jewish National Fund.

Wynns became increasingly involved in political issues surrounding education when her three children started public school in San Francisco. For six years she was the President of San Francisco Parents' Lobby, a citywide political organization for public school parents, and was a founding organizer of a local education coalition, San Franciscans Unified.

== Political history ==
Jill Wynns was first elected to the San Francisco Board of Education in 1992, and was re-elected in 1996, 2000, 2004, 2008, and 2012. She served as President of the School Board in 2001 and 2002, and served as Chair of the Budget Committee for five years. In the November 4, 2012 election, Wynns was elected to the school board for a record fifth term (the longest serving board member).

== Accomplishments ==
Wynns has become nationally recognized for her opposition to the commercialization and privatization of public schools. Wynns also gained renown for helping expose corrupt Superintendent Bill Rojas. As the San Francisco Bay Guardian noted when they endorsed her in 2004, "Wynns has spent years as the board skeptic, asking the uncomfortable questions that needed asking and identifying legal and financial realities."

Wynns was as a supporter of former San Francisco Superintendent Arlene Ackerman, who eventually left after increasing clashes with the board's leftist faction. Ackerman left San Francisco to become superintendent of Philadelphia's school system, and subsequently died in February 2013. Wynns was known as the board's vocal supporter of keeping the JROTC program in San Francisco schools, though the board majority voted to discontinue JROTC. Wynns has said that although she opposes the Iraq war and military recruiters in the schools, students and parents have convinced her that JROTC has provided valuable resources and support to many students. In 2008, San Franciscans agreed with Wynns, voting 55-45 percent in favor of Proposition V, which made it City policy to urge the San Francisco Board of Education to reverse its elimination of the Junior Reserve Officers' Training Corps (JROTC).

Labor negotiations
In 2006, Wynns voted in the majority to hire replacement workers in the event of a teacher's strike after teachers mobilized to fight their low wages and years without a raise. This vote followed a growing rift between Wynns and the union, as Wynns had voted multiple times to lay off teachers. Wynns viewed those actions as necessary to balance the district budget and points out that the San Francisco Unified School District risks being taken over by the state and losing local control if its budget goes into the red, as has happened to other nearby school districts.
