= Edwin Grant =

American politician (1887–1966)

Edwin Ernest Grant

Member of the California Senate from the 19th district
- In office January 6, 1913 – October 8, 1914
- Preceded by: Richard J. Welch
- Succeeded by: Edward I. Wolfe

Personal details
- Born: August 2, 1887 San Francisco, California, U.S.
- Died: August 23, 1966 (aged 79) Alameda, California, U.S.
- Party: Democratic
- Spouse(s): Bessie C. Grant (div. 1925) Margeret Graham
- Children: Verne Grant

Edwin Ernest Grant (August 2, 1887 – August 23, 1966) was an American politician who served in the California State Legislature of the 19th District, representing San Francisco. In 1914, he was the subject of the second successful recall attempt in California history, in which he was replaced by Edward I. Wolfe.

Grant's recall was sparked by his cosponsorship of the Red Light Abatement Act, legislation purportedly aimed at curbing prostitution, a stance at odds with constituents in a San Francisco red-light district he represented. Wolfe, who had previously run against Grant in 1912 and lost by just 95 votes, was elected with 53 percent voting for recall. Grant lost by a margin of three-to-one in San Francisco's vice and financial districts.

During the 1920s, Grant was involved in promoting eugenic immigration restrictions. He authored a paper in May 1925 entitled "Scum from the Melting Pot" calling for a "eugenic cleansing" through mass deportation.
