= George Washington High School (San Francisco) =

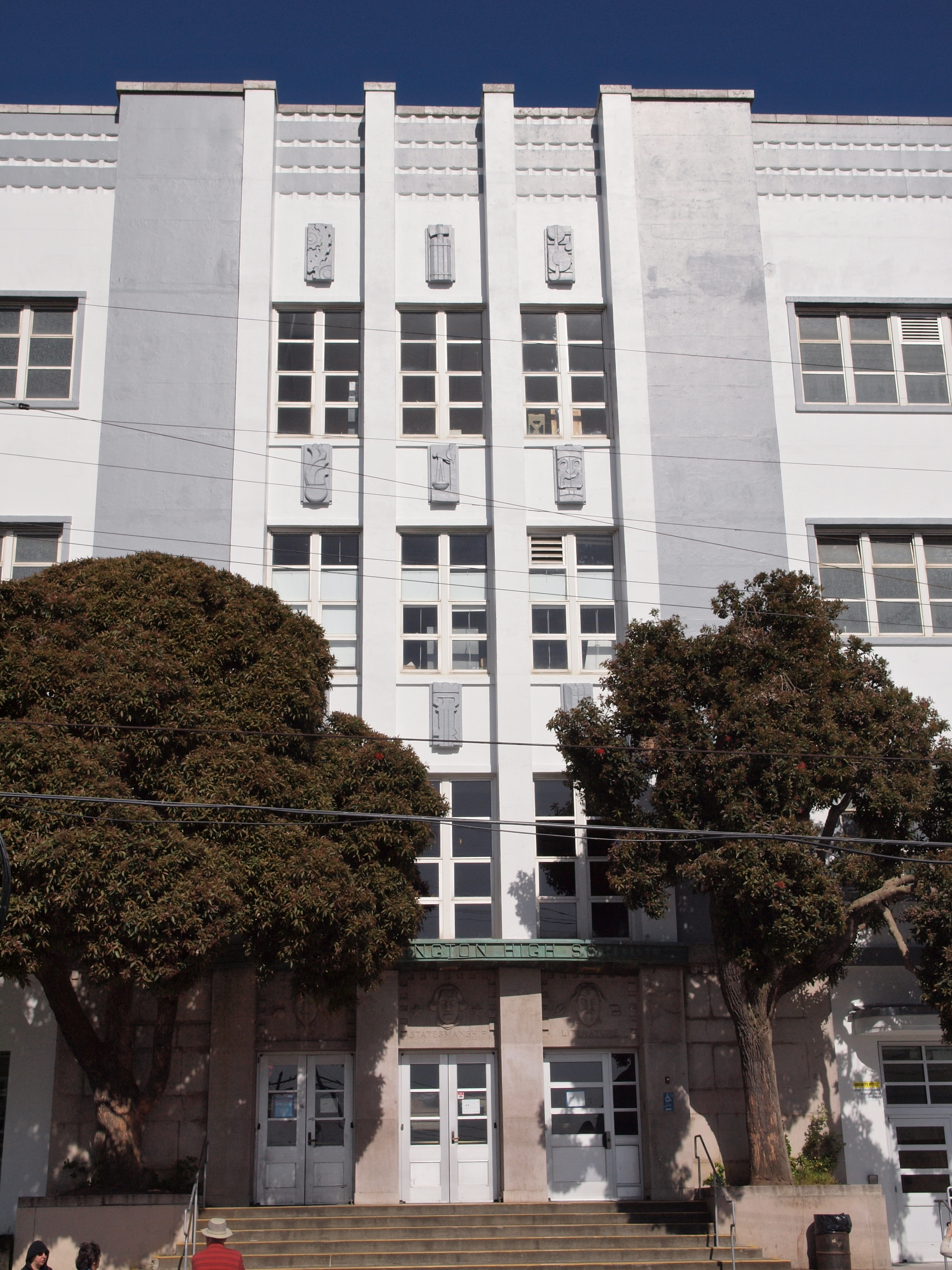

Location
- 600 32nd Avenue; San Francisco, California 94121; United States; 37°46′40.13″N 122°29′31.24″W

Information
- Motto: Of all victories first and greatest is for a man to conquer himself - Plato
- Established: August 4, 1936
- School district: San Francisco Unified School District
- Principal: John Schlauraff
- Faculty: 86.88 (FTE)
- Enrollment: 2,036 (2022–23)
- Student to teacher ratio: 23.43
- Campus: Urban
- Colors: Red and Gray
- Mascot: Eagle
- Rival: Abraham Lincoln High School
- Website: www.sfusd.edu/school/george-washington-high-school

George Washington High School (colloquially GWHS, Wash or Washington High School) is a public high school located in the Richmond District on the West Side of San Francisco, California. The campus occupies the highest ground in the neighborhood, south of Geary Boulevard between 30th and 32nd Avenues, with a sweeping view of the Golden Gate Bridge from the athletic fields. Presidio Middle School, also a public school, is located kitty-corner to the campus.

The school was opened in 1936. Its lobby is decorated with 13 murals in "buon fresco" style by Victor Arnautoff, a student of Diego Rivera, that were commissioned by the Works Progress Administration's Federal Art Project as part of Franklin Delano Roosevelt's New Deal projects for public buildings. Titled Life of Washington, the murals depict scenes from the life of George Washington. Intended to teach students about the realities of history, they include representations of Black slaves and white indentured servants on Washington's estate and, in a panel criticizing the notion of Manifest Destiny, a depiction of a prostrate Native American. The San Francisco Board of Education voted in 2019 to remove the murals as offensive. After protests, the school board's resolution was ruled unlawful in 2021 and was rescinded in 2022.

== History ==
The City of San Francisco set aside $2 million in 1930 to build a high school to serve the Richmond District, its seventh public high school and most expensive school at that time. The three-story academic building was designed by Timothy L. Pflueger and inspired by Washington's home in Virginia, Mount Vernon. It was planned to accommodate 3,000 students. Arnautoff was assisted by George Harris and Gorden Langdon in his work on the murals, and the school also has mural work by Ralph Stackpole, Robert Boardman Howard, and Lucien Labaudt, and bas relief faces by Arnautoff of Washington, Thomas Edison, and William Shakespeare above the main doors. A bas relief frieze on the wall of the football stadium, Athletics, is by Beniamino Bufano and Sargent Johnson.

Washington High School opened on August 4, 1936 (reportedly before the classrooms were furnished); the stadium, auditorium, and gymnasium were added in 1940, and the school was formally dedicated on Armistice Day 1940. The first principal, Ernest J. Cummings, served until 1945 when he became Deputy Superintendent of Secondary Schools.

The school song, the Washington Hymn, was written by student Tillie Miesles, class of 1937, with a 1947 addition by teacher Marion Knott.

=== Arnautoff murals controversy ===
The murals by Victor Arnautoff in the school lobby attracted criticism for the realistic depiction of the African-American slaves and white indentured servants that George Washington had on his Mount Vernon estate, and for an allegorical depiction, in a mural intended as a criticism of the concept of Manifest Destiny, of four pioneers treading over and beside a dead Native American. In 1974 the school added three murals by Dewey Crumpler to assuage complaints, and Crumpler has said that the students at that time apologized for their failure to understand the intent of the works and the devices used by Arnautoff to convey the realities of history.

In June 2019, the San Francisco Board of Education voted to paint over the Arnautoff murals, There was broad opposition, including from the National Coalition Against Censorship, the College Art Association, and in an open letter signed by 400 scholars and artists. San Francisco Heritage, a non-profit devoted to preserving the city's artistic and architectural legacy, proposed the school be designated a city landmark on the basis of this and other features. The school's alumni association expressed support for the murals. Alice Walker, whose daughter attended the school, suggested that explanations be added to provide context: "If you cover things up, the danger is that you will end up in the same place again, and you won’t even recognize it."

The school board voted to instead conceal the Arnautoff murals with curtains or panels, but on September 24, 2021, the San Francisco Superior Court determined that its decisions to either destroy or cover the murals violated environmental law and must be reversed. The school board appealed the decision, but after a successful recall of many members, the new board voted in June 2022 to rescind its decision to conceal the murals.

== Demographics ==
2025-2026

White	Latino	Asian	African American	Pacific Islander	American Indian	Two or More Races	Not Reported
13.9%	21.5%	48.6%	4.1%	0.3%	0.4%	7.3%	3.9%

According to 2023 U.S. News & World Report, 62% of the student body comes from an economically disadvantaged household, determined by student eligibility for California's reduced-price meal program.

== Facilities ==
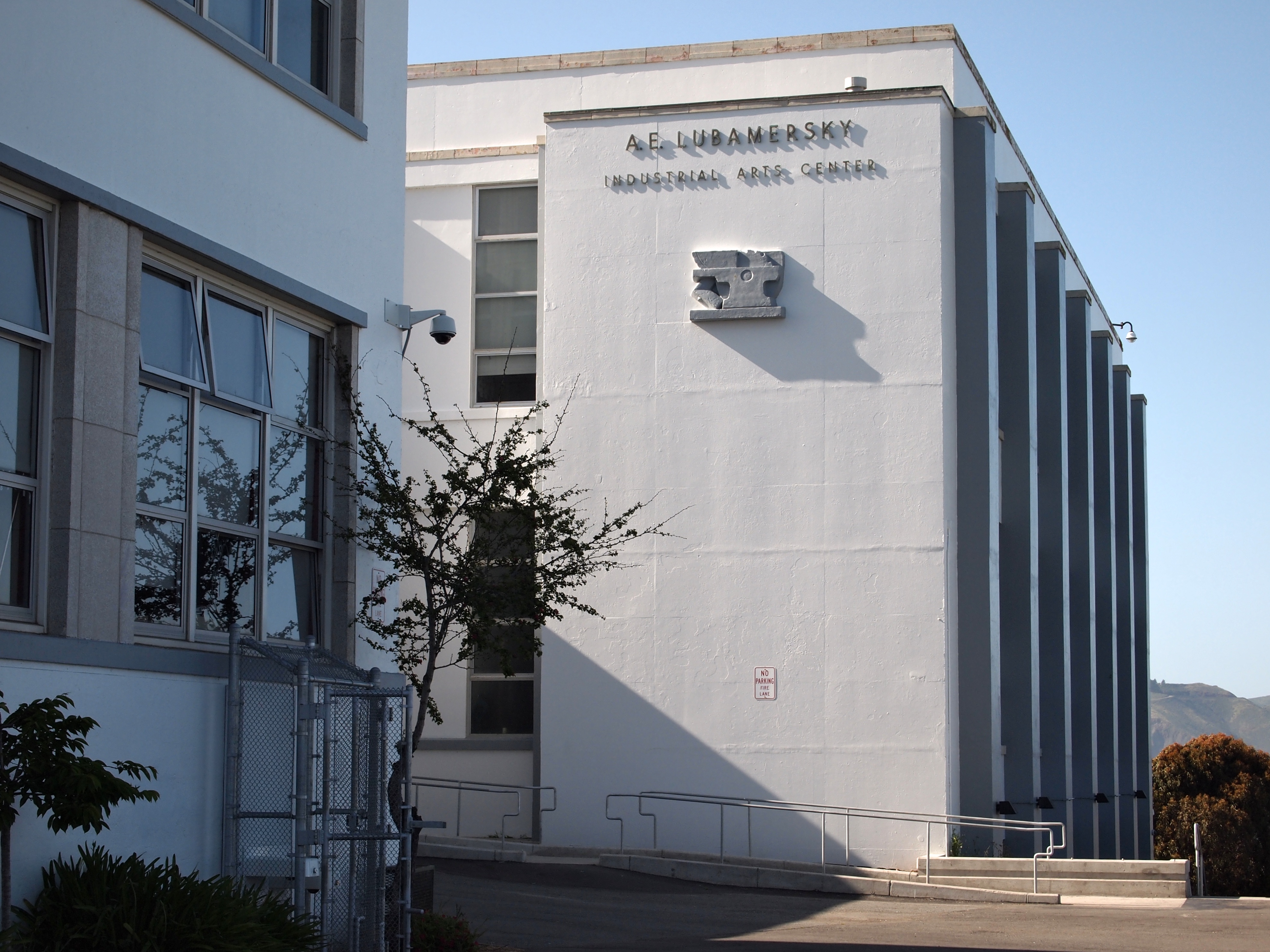
A. E. Lubamersky Industrial Arts Center

The school has computer labs, an auditorium/theater, a library, and a two-story shop building. Athletics facilities include a gymnasium, a football/soccer field and a multipurpose field, 6 tennis courts, 3 full-sized and 1 half-sized basketball courts, track and field facilities, and facilities for baseball/softball including 2 batting cages, a front toss cage, and a bullpen.

== Academics ==
In 2011, Washington High was ranked by Newsweek as the 497th best high school in the United States. The curriculum includes a variety of advanced Visual Performing Arts classes including: Dance Company, Ceramics, Vocal Music, Band and Orchestra, Computer Art and AP Art and Design. There is a computer lab and a Computer Science pathway, plus courses in Robotics. Washington is one of only two San Francisco public high schools with a Marching Band, the other being Phillip & Sala Burton High School.

The school is a Newcomer Pathway school that serves students who have recently arrived in the United States, primarily from China and Latin America. There is also an extensive program for special needs students, who comprise about 10% of the student population.

== Sports ==
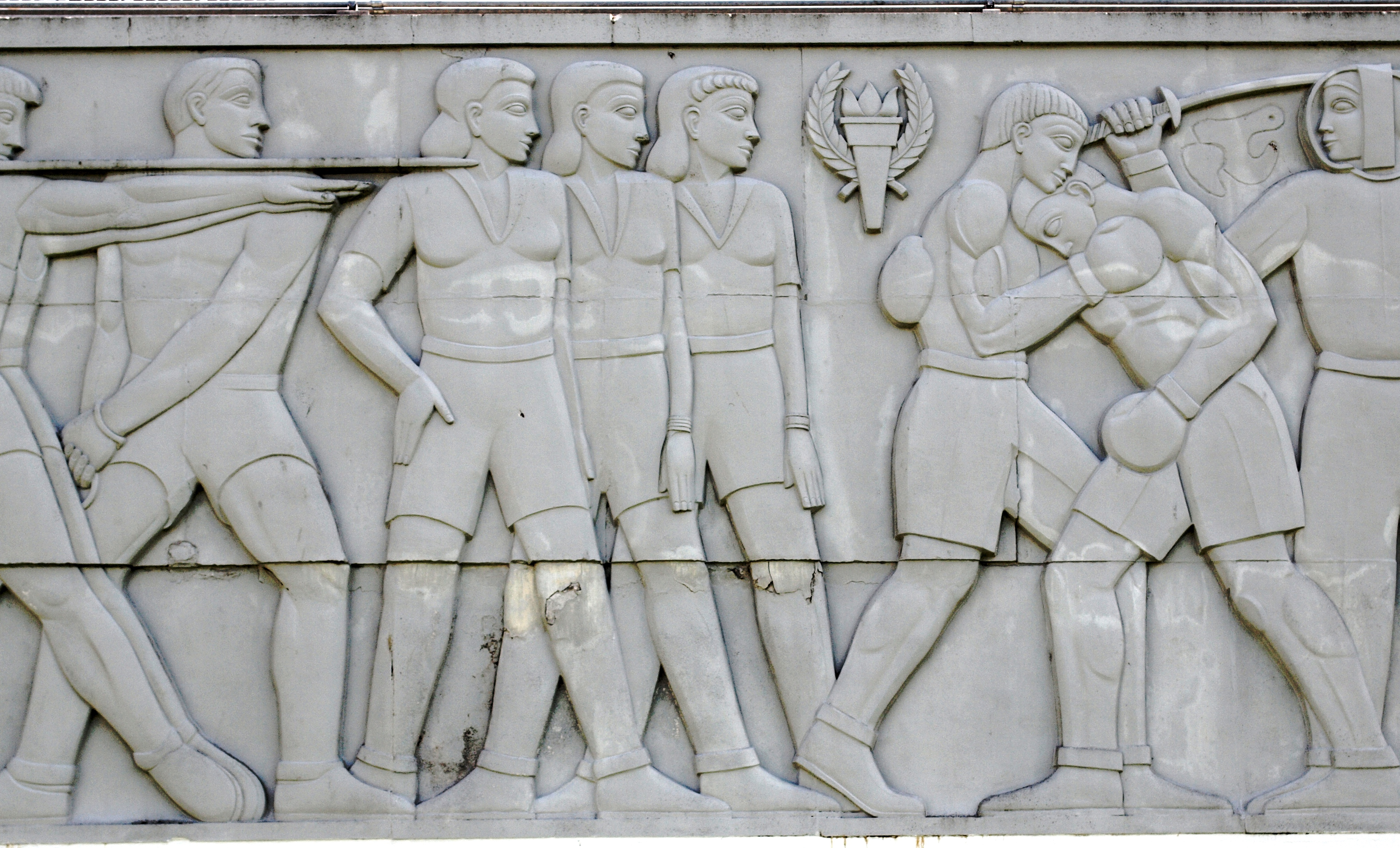
Detail of Athletics frieze on the stadium, completed in 1942 by Sargent Johnson

The George Washington High athletic program is governed by the Academic Athletic Association and sanctioned by the California Interscholastic Federation. The school supports 20 varsity, 7 junior varsity, and freshman-sophomore athletics programs. Sports offered include: cross country, track and field, swimming, fencing, wrestling, badminton, baseball, softball, basketball, football, cheerleading, boys' and girls' golf, boys' and girls' soccer, boys' and girls' tennis, and boys' and girls' volleyball. The school has won a number of league championships.

== In media ==
In season five, episode five (1976) of the TV series The Streets of San Francisco, Maureen McCormick plays a teenage hooker attending the school. Two scenes show the school and its view of the Golden Gate Bridge.

In 1981, the Pacific News Service aired a story about race-based gangs at George Washington High School.

In 1992, for a San Francisco Chronicle series intended to explore the impact of reduced school funding resulting from Proposition 13's reduction of property taxes, a 26-year-old reporter, Shann Nix, went undercover as a senior at Washington High School.

== Notable alumni ==
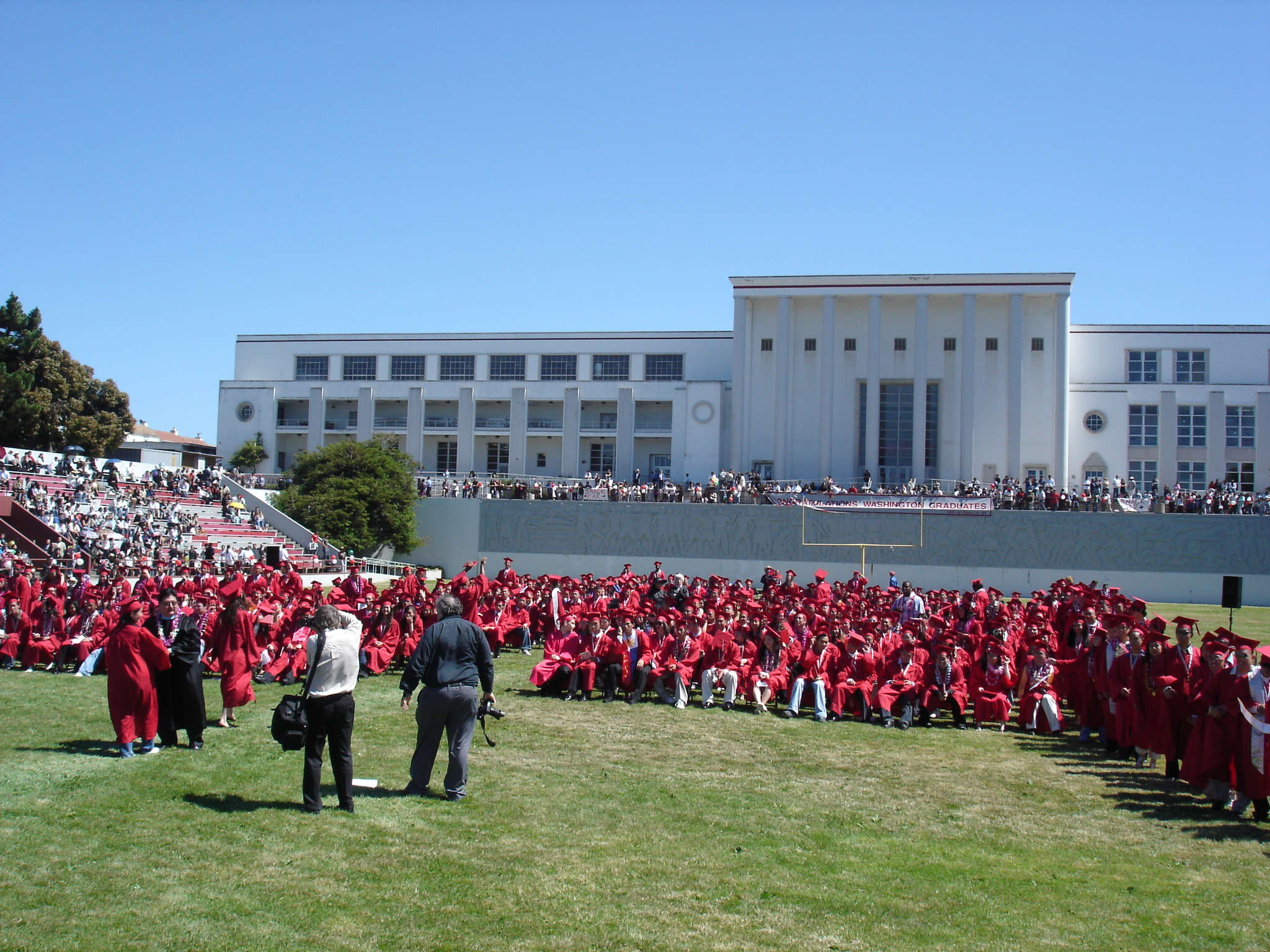
Senior graduation, 2006

- Diane Amos, Pine-Sol lady
- Maya Angelou, poet
- Marty Balin, former lead singer of the Jefferson Starship
- Josiah Beeman, US Ambassador
- Noel Lee (executive), founder of Monster Cable Products
- Gene Brown, basketball player
- Mack Burton, former Canadian football player
- Phillip Burton, US congressman
- Rosemary Casals, professional tennis player
- Ann Curtis, Olympic medalist in swimming
- Dorothy Delasin, golfer
- O'Koyea Dickson, former outfielder for the Los Angeles Dodgers
- Keith Fowler, actor, director, producer, educator
- Thomas Gangale, aerospace engineer, political scientist, space jurist
- Danny Glover, actor
- Ross Giudice, basketball player and coach
- Steve Gray, basketball player
- Richard Hongisto, politician
- Serhiy Kandaurov, footballer
- Damon Keeve, Olympic medalist in judoka
- Leo Krupnik, Ukrainian-born American-Israeli soccer player and coach
- Rachel Kushner, writer
- Amanda Lassiter, basketball player in the WNBA
- Marcio Lassiter, basketball player in the Philippines
- Gilman Louie, technologist
- Richard Lui, news anchor for MSNBC
- Alec Mapa, writer, comedian and actor
- Hal March, 1950s television personality
- Del Martin, lesbian activist
- Johnny Mathis, singer
- Ollie Matson, member of College and Pro Football Halls of Fame, Olympic medalist
- Sean McGrath, musician and artist
- Lee Meriwether, model, actress, and Miss America
- Nathan Oliveira, artist
- Betty Ong, flight attendant on 9/11 jet American Airlines Flight 11
- San Quinn, rapper
- John Rothmann, talk radio host
- Angelo Sangiacomo (1924–2015), San Francisco real estate developer
- Jim Sochor, former football head coach, UC Davis
- Phil Smith, NBA player
- Gregg Turkington, comedian
- Paul Vixie, internet pioneer
- Martin Wong, artist
- Al Young, drag racer
- Connie Young Yu, writer, historian, lecturer

== See also ==
- San Francisco County high schools
