= 2018 San Francisco mayoral special election =

- June 5, 2018
- Turnout: 52.61 (▲7.16 pp)
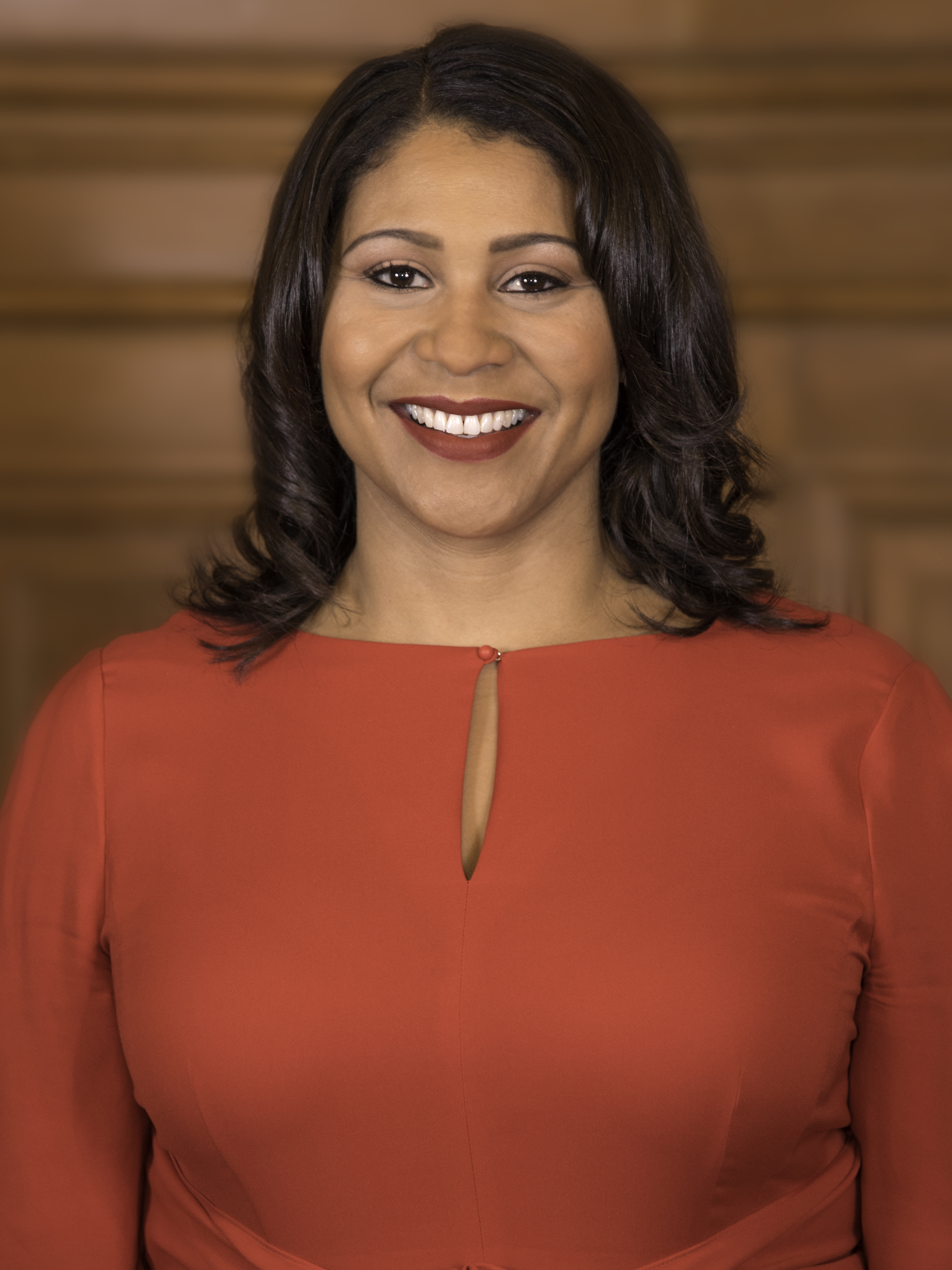

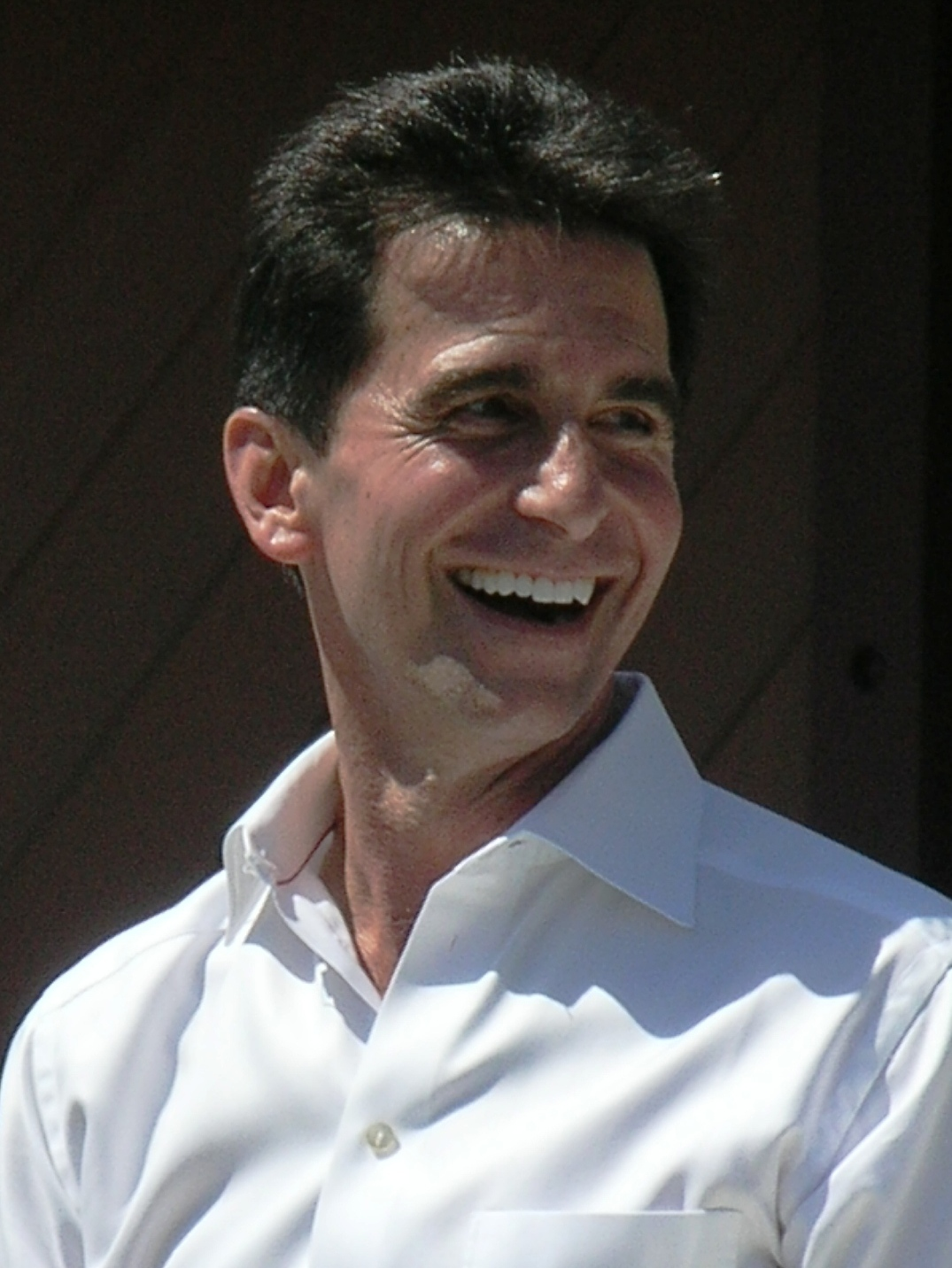

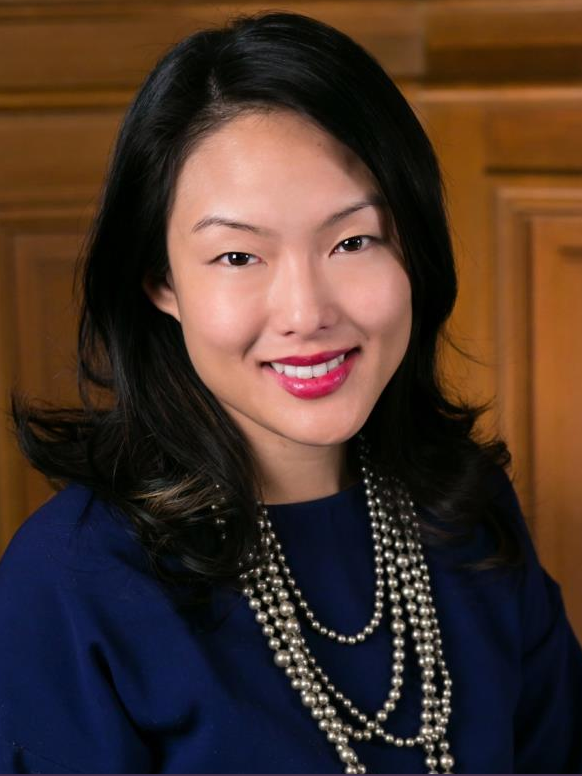

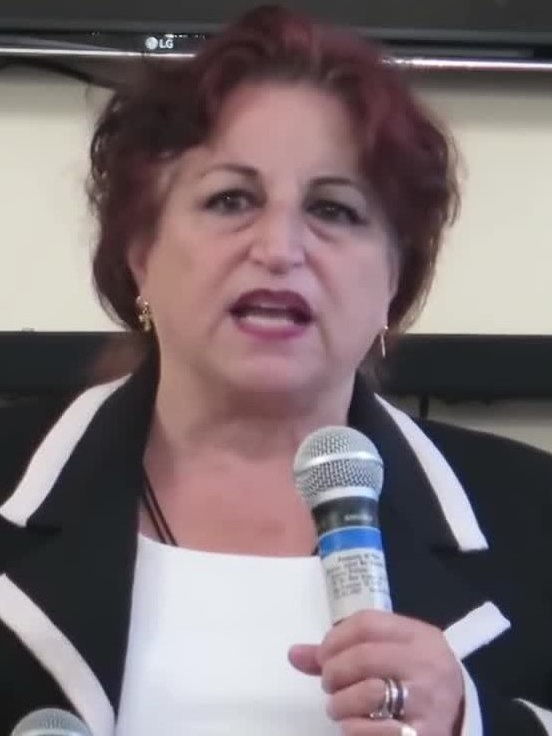
Candidate	London Breed	Mark Leno
First round	92,121; 36.70%	61,416; 24.47%
Maximum round	115,977; 50.55%	113,431; 49.45%
Candidate	Jane Kim	Angela Alioto
First round	60,738; 24.20%	17,552; 6.91%
Maximum round	Eliminated	Eliminated
- First choice results by supervisorial district Breed: 30–40% 40–50% Leno: 30–40% Kim: 30–40%
Mayor before election
Mark Farrell
Elected mayor
London Breed

A special election was held for mayor of the City and County of San Francisco on June 5, 2018, to fill the remainder of the term of Ed Lee, who had died in office on December 12, 2017. Upon Lee's death, London Breed, president of the San Francisco Board of Supervisors, became acting mayor of San Francisco, but a vote of six supervisors replaced Breed with Supervisor Mark Farrell. The mayoral election was held concurrently with the statewide direct primary election. In San Francisco, the election for the eighth district member of the board of supervisors was also on the ballot.

Eight candidates qualified to appear on the ballot, and a ninth qualified as a write-in. The four major candidates were former Supervisor Angela Alioto, former acting mayor London Breed, supervisor Jane Kim and former state senator Mark Leno. All four main candidates identified as Democrats, though the position is officially nonpartisan per the Constitution of California. The election was won by Breed, with Leno conceding the election on June 13. All local elections in California are nonpartisan.

== Background ==
Ed Lee, who was appointed mayor of San Francisco in 2011 following Gavin Newsom's election as lieutenant governor of California, elected to a full term in 2011, and reelected in 2015, died of cardiac arrest on December 12, 2017. London Breed, the president of the San Francisco Board of Supervisors, became the city's acting mayor.

On January 23, 2018, the board of supervisors selected Mark Farrell to serve as interim mayor until the special election could be held. Citing Ron Conway's role as a benefactor to Breed, Supervisors Aaron Peskin and Jane Kim, considered the progressive members of the board, sought to deny Breed the benefits of incumbency going into the election.

As San Francisco elections use ranked choice voting, Kim and Mark Leno chose to align with each other, each endorsing the other as their preferred second choice.

== Candidates ==
The filing deadline was 5 p.m. on January 9, 2018.

=== Qualified ===
The following eight candidates qualified for the ballot by filing all nomination documents and paying the filing fee. The deadline for a candidate to drop out of the race and remove himself or herself from the ballot was January 30, 2018.

- Angela Alioto, anti-discrimination attorney, former supervisor; unsuccessfully ran for mayor in 1991, 1995, and 2003
- Michelle Bravo, holistic health practitioner
- London Breed, former acting mayor; supervisor (5th district) and president of the board of supervisors
- Richie Greenberg, business consultant, Republican County Central Committee delegate
- Jane Kim, supervisor (6th district), former president of the San Francisco Board of Education
- Mark Leno, former supervisor, former state assemblyman, former state senator
- Amy Farah Weiss, homelessness activist
- Ellen Lee Zhou, social worker

=== Declined ===
- David Chiu, state assemblyman
- Carmen Chu, city assessor-recorder
- Mark Farrell, supervisor (2nd district), later appointed interim mayor
- Dennis Herrera, city attorney (2002–present), former president of the city police commission
- Daniel Lurie, philanthropist, CEO of Tipping Point Community
- Scott Wiener, state senator

== General election ==
=== Endorsements ===
Angela Alioto

Organizations

- San Francisco Police Officers Association
Richie Greenberg

Organizations

- San Francisco Log Cabin Republicans LGBT
- San Francisco Republican Party
- Small Property Owners of San Francisco
Jane Kim

Organizations

- Harvey Milk Lesbian, Gay, Bisexual, Transgender Democratic Club (dual endorsement with Mark Leno)
- Our Revolution
- Peace Officers Research Association of California (Jane Kim #1)
- The People for Bernie Sanders
- San Francisco Bicycle Coalition (dual endorsement with Mark Leno)
- San Francisco Democratic Party (endorsed as second choice; party endorsed Leno as first choice)
- San Francisco Deputy Sheriffs' Association (Jane Kim #1)
- Service Employees International Union, Local 1021

Politicians

- Tom Ammiano, former California State Assemblyman, LGBT rights activist
- John Avalos, former San Francisco supervisor
- Matt Gonzalez, former San Francisco supervisor
Mark Leno

Organizations

- Alice B. Toklas LGBT Democratic Club
- Equality California
- Gay and Lesbian Victory Fund
- Harvey Milk Lesbian, Gay, Bisexual, Transgender Democratic Club (dual endorsement with Jane Kim)
- San Francisco Bicycle Coalition (dual endorsement with Jane Kim)
- San Francisco Democratic Party (endorsed as first choice)
- San Francisco Deputy Sheriffs' Association (Mark Leno #2)

Politicians

- Toni Atkins, president pro tempore, California Senate
- Sandra Lee Fewer, San Francisco supervisor
- John A. Perez, former Assembly Speaker state assemblyman from Los Angeles
- Aaron Peskin, San Francisco supervisor
- Ahsha Safaí, San Francisco supervisor
- Scott Wiener, state senator (jointly endorsed Breed and Leno)
- Norman Yee, San Francisco supervisor
- Juanita More, drag artist and activist
London Breed

Newspapers

- San Francisco Chronicle

Organizations

- San Francisco Firefighter's Union
- YIMBY Action

Politicians

- David Chiu, California state assemblymember
- Gabrielle Giffords, former congresswoman from Arizona (2007-2012)
- Mark Kelly, astronaut
- Pius Lee, Chinatown power broker
- Scott Wiener, state senator (jointly endorsed Breed and Leno)

=== Polling ===
Poll source	Date(s) administered	RCV Choice	Sample size	Margin of error	Angela Alioto	London Breed	Richie Greenberg	Jane Kim	Mark Leno	Other	Undecided
Fairbank, Maslin, Maullin, Metz & Associates	April 20–23, 2018	First	600	± 3.0%	8%	28%	6%	17%	21%	—	—
Greenberg Quinlan Rosner Research	March 28 – April 3, 2018	First	610	± 4.0%	6%	27%	—	17%	29%	—	9%
Fairbank, Maslin, Maullin, Metz & Associates	February 22–28, 2018	First	462	± 4.6%	8%	29%	—	26%	19%	—	—
KPIX-TV/Survey USA	January 13–14, 2018	First	717	± 4.3%	9%	19%	—	13%	22%	—	—
SurveyUSA (with RCV)	January 10–14, 2018	First	462	± 4.6%	9%	19%	4%	14%	22%	6%	22%
SurveyUSA (with RCV)	January 10–14, 2018	Second	385	± 5.1%	16%	19%	6%	10%	25%	7%	16%
SurveyUSA (with RCV)	January 10–14, 2018	Third	306	± 5.7%	13%	12%	9%	16%	15%	8%	26%
Public Policy Polling	December 18–19, 2017	First	627	± 4.0%	—	20%	—	5%	26%	26%	23%

== Results ==
First-place votes counted on election night had Breed leading with 35.6 percent, Leno in second with 25.9 percent, and Kim with 22.8 percent. As candidates began to be eliminated, Leno took the lead the next day. He maintained a small lead during the week. On June 9, Breed took the lead over Leno. On June 13, with only 8,000 ballots left to count, Leno conceded defeat and congratulated Breed on her victory.

=== Results summary ===
The following table shows a summary of the instant runoff for the election. The table shows the round in which the candidate was defeated or elected the winner, the votes for the candidate in that round, and what share those votes were of all votes counting for any candidate in that round. There is also a bar graph showing those votes for each candidate and categorized as either first-round votes or votes that were transferred from another candidate.

San Francisco mayoral special election, 2018
Candidate	Maximum round	Maximum votes	Share in maximum round	Maximum votes First round votesTransfer votes
London Breed	9	115,977	50.55%	
Mark Leno	9	113,431	49.45%	
Jane Kim	8	66,043	27.81%	
Angela Alioto	7	21,981	8.94%	
Ellen Lee Zhou	6	10,637	4.28%	
Richie Greenberg	5	7,242	2.89%	
Amy Farah Weiss	4	1,735	0.69%	
Michelle Bravo	3	900	0.36%	
Antoine R. Rogers (Write-in)	2	3	0.00%	
Write-ins	1	0	0.00%	

San Francisco mayoral special election, 2018 First Round Ballot Summary
	Count	Share of Contest Ballots
Continuing Votes	251,032	98.83%
Over Votes	634	0.25%
Under Votes	2,350	0.93%
Contest Ballots	254,016	100.00%
Registered Voters	481,991	
Contest Turnout	52.70%	

=== Vote counts by round ===
The following table shows how votes were counted in a series of rounds of instant runoffs. Each voter could mark which candidates were the voter's first, second, and third choice. Each voter had one vote, but could mark three choices for how that vote can be counted. In each round, the vote is counted for the most preferred candidate who has not yet been eliminated. Then one or more candidates with the fewest votes are eliminated. Votes that counted for an eliminated candidate are transferred to the voter's next most preferred candidate who has not yet been eliminated.

Candidate	Round 1	Round 2	Round 3	Round 4	Round 5	Round 6	Round 7	Round 8	Round 9
London Breed	92,121	92,121	92,124	92,243	92,442	93,605	96,392	102,767	115,977
Mark Leno	61,416	61,416	61,416	61,533	61,881	62,861	64,128	68,707	113,431
Jane Kim	60,738	60,738	60,738	60,829	61,422	61,843	63,261	66,043	
Angela Alioto	17,552	17,552	17,552	17,737	17,929	19,626	21,981		
Ellen Lee Zhou	9,576	9,576	9,576	9,687	9,829	10,637			
Richie Greenberg	7,051	7,051	7,051	7,128	7,242				
Amy Farah Weiss	1,675	1,675	1,675	1,735					
Michelle Bravo	900	900	900						
Antoine R. Rogers (Write-in)	3	3							
Write-in	0								
Continuing votes	251,032	251,032	251,032	250,892	250,745	248,572	245,762	237,517	224,009
Exhausted ballots	0	0	0	136	280	2,445	5,237	13,456	21,510
Over votes	634	634	634	638	641	649	667	693	748
Under votes	2,350	2,350	2,350	2,350	2,350	2,350	2,350	2,350	2,350
Total	254,016	254,016	254,016	254,016	254,016	254,016	254,016	254,016	254,016

Continuing votes are votes that counted for a candidate in that round. Exhausted ballots represent votes that could not be transferred because a less preferred candidate was not marked on the ballot. Voters were allowed to mark only three choices because of voting system limitations. Over votes are votes that could not be counted for a candidate because more than one candidate was marked for a choice that was ready to be counted. Under votes are ballots were left blank or that only marked a choice for a write-in candidate who had not qualified as a write-in candidate.
