= Pius Lee =

American political power broker and landlord

- 李兆祥
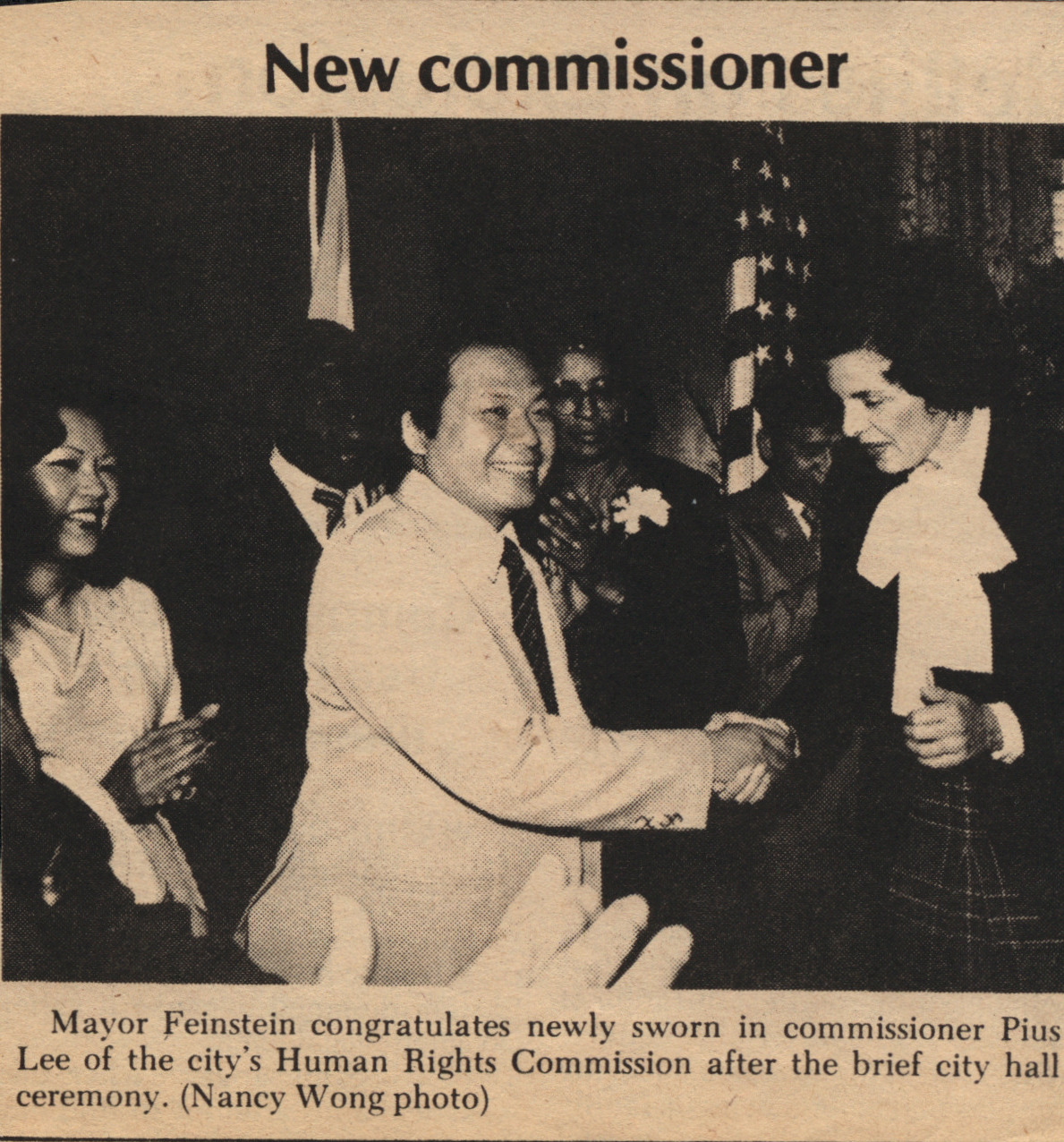
- Lee shaking hands with Dianne Feinstein in the 1970s
- Born: 1937 (age 88–89); Doumen, Guangdong, China
- Occupations: Landlord; Realtor
- Known for: Political power broker in San Francisco

Pius Lee
- Chinese: 李兆祥
Transcriptions
Standard Mandarin
- Hanyu Pinyin: Lǐ Zhàoxiáng
Yue: Cantonese
- Jyutping: lei5 siu6 coeng4

Pius Lee (born 1937) is an American political power broker and landlord. He was a long-time supporter of Mayor Willie Brown and has served as the commissioner on several governmental commissions in San Francisco, including the San Francisco Port Commission and the San Francisco Police Commission. He serves as the chairman of the Chinese Six Companies and the Chinese Neighborhood Association.

== Biography ==
Lee was born in Tin Sam, a village of Doumen, then part of Zhongshan, Guangdong. His grandfather had moved to the United States in the past, where he spent 30 years as a prosperous farmer in Fresno, California, before returning to Doumen and purchasing 40 acres of land to lease to tenant farmers. Lee's father was a teacher in Zhuhai, where Lee spent most of his childhood in Chen Sang village. Lee's mother died when he was young, after which his father remarried, through which Lee had three younger half-siblings.

In 1949, after the founding of the People's Republic of China, Lee's family were classified as small landlords. Due to this, Lee's father arranged for his family's relocation to Portuguese Macau through the father of one of his students. In summer 1951, when Lee was 14, the Lee family, consisting of his parents and three elder siblings, along with several other emigrants, were brought to the border village of Kwan Chap, from where the group swam 400 metres (1,300 ft) from Zhuhai to Macau. The process took 15 minutes, with their guide returning to mainland China after helping Lee's father, who could not swim.

Three days after arrival, the family crossed into British Hong Kong, living with the Hung brothers. One of them, Hung Chap Man, provided Lee with an apprenticeship at their machinery shop during daytime, with Lee attending English classes in the nights. He received a high school diploma in 1960 and the same year, he took a position at the Education Department of Hong Kong as an English teacher for a primary school in Tai O. Through his work, he met barrister Brook Bernacchi, US consular officer Lou Goelz, and buddhist priest DowLan. In 1961, Lee quit his job to work as a secretary at Bernacchi's newly opened drug rehabilitation clinic on Shek Kwu Chau.

In early 1963, Lou Goelz offered Lee to move to the United States through an immigration program for Hong Kongers, reasoning that while he did not have any relatives in the country, his status as a refugee from China would allow him entry with Goelz as his sponsor. On 1 May 1963, together with his wife and older sister Linda, Lee boarded an American President Lines ship, arriving at the port of San Francisco 18 days later. The family lived in Santa Clara for one month, residing at a nursery run by a family friend, Lam Chi Chiu, whose younger brother later married Lee's sister. Lee and his wife moved to a studio apartment in the Chinatown of San Francisco, where his wife had become employed at a sewing factory while Lee worked as a bank teller at San Francisco Saving & Loan. Within two years, Lee's wife started working at the accounting department of the British Motor Corporation while Lee became a representative for a seamstress union. The couple had two children, both born in the United States.

As part of the Great Society program, Lee was appointed a member of the Economic Development Committee by San Francisco Mayor John Shelley, representing Chinatown, which had received $500,000 (equivalent to $5,190,451 in 2025) in funding as a low-income area. Lee In 1966, he became the head of the committee and seeing the success of the program, Lee decided to go into politicis. He first planned to attend evening classes for law school, but as he lacked financial means, he instead went to real estate school. A local real estate agent paid Lee's tuition in exchange for Lee working at his firm for a year after graduation. In 1968, after receiving his real estate license, Lee opened his own business, California Realty & Land Inc. He sold homes to Chinese families, most from Hong Kong, in the Richmond District and Sunset District and built a real estate portfolio consisting of properties across San Francisco, from the Marina District to Chinatown. Among the Lee's Chinese customers was Hung Chap Man, who was able to secure residency with his children through his bought property.

== Political career ==
Lee was appointed president of the San Francisco-Taipei Sister City Committee by Mayor Dianne Feinstein. As president, he began the effort to build the Golden Gate Pavilion in Golden Gate Park in 1981.

Lee ran for San Francisco Board of Supervisors in the 1980s and got 25,000 votes. Mayor Willie Brown appointed Lee to the San Francisco Port Commission. He has also served on Chinatown Economic Development Group, the Industrial Welfare Commission and the Police Commission among others. In 1992, Lee organized a gun buyback program while serving as a police commissioner that gathered approximately 1,600 guns.

Lee resigned from the San Francisco Port Commission in 2002 over remarks by Mayor Willie Brown in regards to Lee's relationship with Planning Commissioner Hector Chinchilla. Brown said, "Pius paid [Chinchilla] what some might look at as a $20,000 bribe". Chinchilla was arrested in November 2002 for misdemeanor charges of allegedly hiring himself out to three developers seeking planning commission permits, one of whom was Lee. Lee believed Brown's remark would have influenced the Board of Supervisor's decision to not approve Lee's project of converting the Apollo Theater on Geneva Avenue in the Outer Mission into a Walgreens.

Lee announced his retirement from real estate and politics in March 2024.

=== Political influence ===
Lee praised the Democratic Party for their policies toward minorities and the impoverished but also admitted that it is impractical to be a Republican in San Francisco.

Lee has an extensive guanxi, or social network. President Lee Teng-hui of Taiwan, a friend of Lee's and then mayor of Taipei, contributed toward the Golden Gate Pavilion project in Golden Gate Park. Lee organized a fundraiser for Willie Brown's 1999 San Francisco mayoral campaign. He endorsed London Breed in the 2018 San Francisco mayoral special election, saying “[Breed] said publicly that she will carry on Ed Lee’s policies and programs in Chinatown".

Lee is the chairman of the Chinese Six Companies, which holds significant political influence in San Francisco Chinatown, and the Chinese Neighborhood Association. The two organizations lobbied the San Francisco Municipal Transportation Agency to ban marijuana ads on MUNI buses and proposed a 50-dispensary cap in San Francisco. Lee endorsed Supervisor Aaron Peskin's call to ban dispensaries in Chinatown.

According to Claire Jean Kim, Lee and Chinatown power broker Rose Pak were "famously at odds." Lee and Pak both opposed a proposed recall of Mayor Ed Lee in 2016.
