= Jane Kim =

American politician (born 1977)

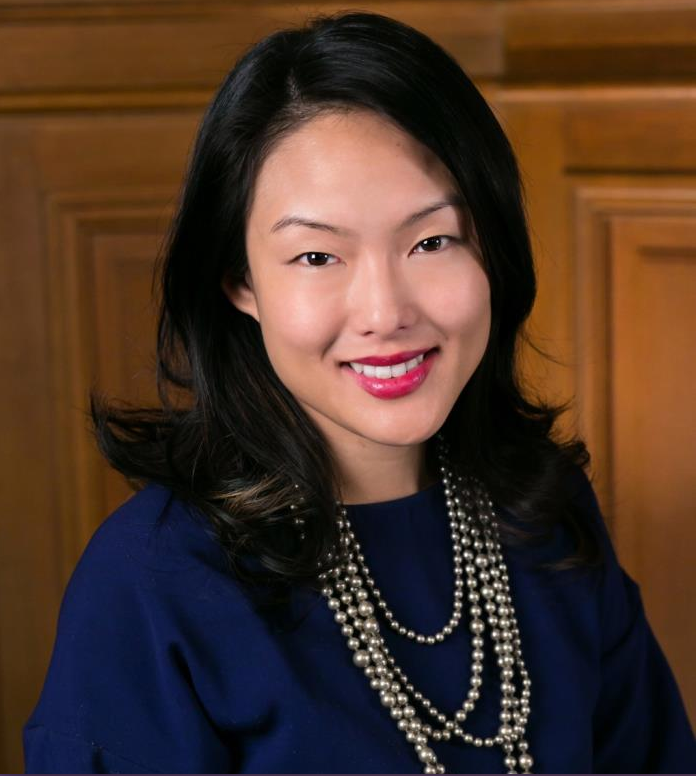
- Official portrait, 2014

Insurance Commissioner-elect of California
- Assuming office January 4, 2027
- Governor: Xavier Becerra (elect)
- Succeeding: Ricardo Lara

Member of the San Francisco Board of Supervisors from the 6th district
- In office January 8, 2011 – January 8, 2019
- Preceded by: Chris Daly
- Succeeded by: Matt Haney

Personal details
- Born: Jane Jungyon Kim; July 9, 1977 (age 49) New York City, New York, U.S.
- Party: Green (before 2008); Democratic (2008–present)
- Other political affiliations: Working Families (2022–present)
- Education: Stanford University (BA); University of California, Berkeley (JD)
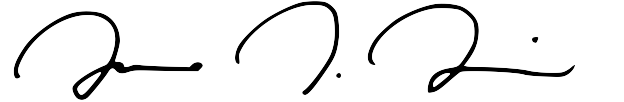
- Signature
- Website: Campaign website

Jane Jungyon Kim (born July 9, 1977) is an American attorney and politician who is the insurance commissioner-elect of California. Prior to her election as insurance commissioner, she was the first Korean American elected official in San Francisco.

Kim represented San Francisco's District 6 on the Board of Supervisors between 2011 and 2019. She is a member of San Francisco's Democratic County Central Committee. She was the inaugural executive director of the California Working Families Party.

Prior to her election to the Board of Supervisors, Kim was a member and then president of the San Francisco Board of Education. In 2016, she ran for the 11th California State Senate District, but lost to Scott Wiener in a run-off election after finishing first place in the primary. She was a candidate for mayor in the 2018 San Francisco mayoral special election, finishing third with 24.03% of the first-round vote.

She was the California political director and national regional political director for Bernie Sanders' 2020 presidential campaign. In 2026, she announced her candidacy 2026 California Insurance Commissioner election, stating that California homeowners should have universal wildfire and disaster insurance managed by a new state agency. Kim would go on to win the election with 54.2%% of the vote against state senator Ben Allen, winning 48 of the states 58 counties. She will be the first Woman and first Asian American elected to the office, and the first Korean American and Working Families Party candidate elected to statewide office in California History.

== Early life and education ==
Jane Kim was born in Manhattan on July 9, 1977, to South Korean parents who immigrated to the U.S. from Seoul in 1971.

Kim grew up learning both the English and Korean languages. Her mother owned a store selling women's clothing. Her father joined Kiss Products, a global cosmetics company, while she was in college. At age 14, Kim began studying taekwondo, eventually earning a black belt. She was involved with community activism, especially the issue of homelessness. While attending Spence School, a New York prep school, she stopped reciting the Pledge of Allegiance in her teens—she rejected the Pledge words "with liberty and justice for all," because she saw that LGBT people were not treated equally.

Kim graduated from Stanford University with a bachelor's degree in political science and Asian American studies. She settled in San Francisco and attended the UC Berkeley School of Law. Kim earned a J.D. degree and was admitted to the State Bar of California in 2009.

== Career ==
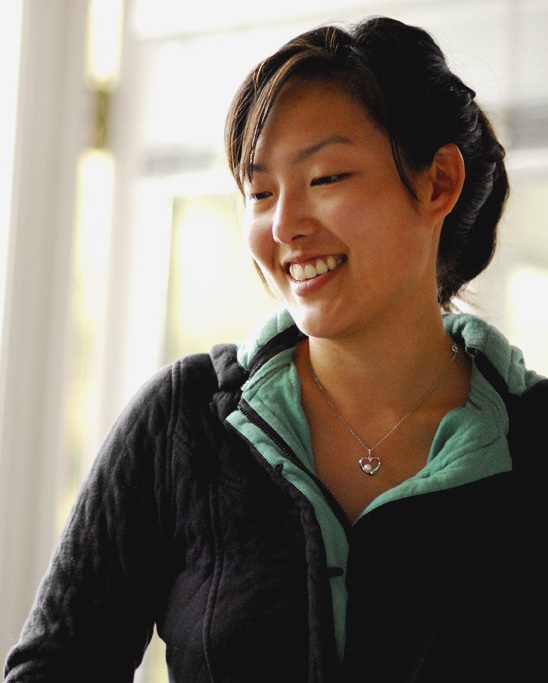
Kim in 2006

After graduating from Stanford, Kim worked as a Fellow at Greenlining Institute in San Francisco and then as a youth community organizer at Chinatown Community Development Center (CCDC). Reverend Norman Fong, who interviewed her, took a risk in hiring Kim as she was not Chinese American and did not speak Chinese but “she won him over.” Kim successfully led a youth volunteer and leadership program in San Francisco Chinatown for six years. Through her community organization efforts, she met power broker Rose Pak.

In 2005 Kim was elected president of San Francisco People's Organization (SFPO), made up of many notable San Francisco activists and organizers. SFPO worked against several California ballot propositions in November 2005, and assisted with health care and affordable housing measures for San Franciscans through 2006.

== San Francisco Board of Education ==
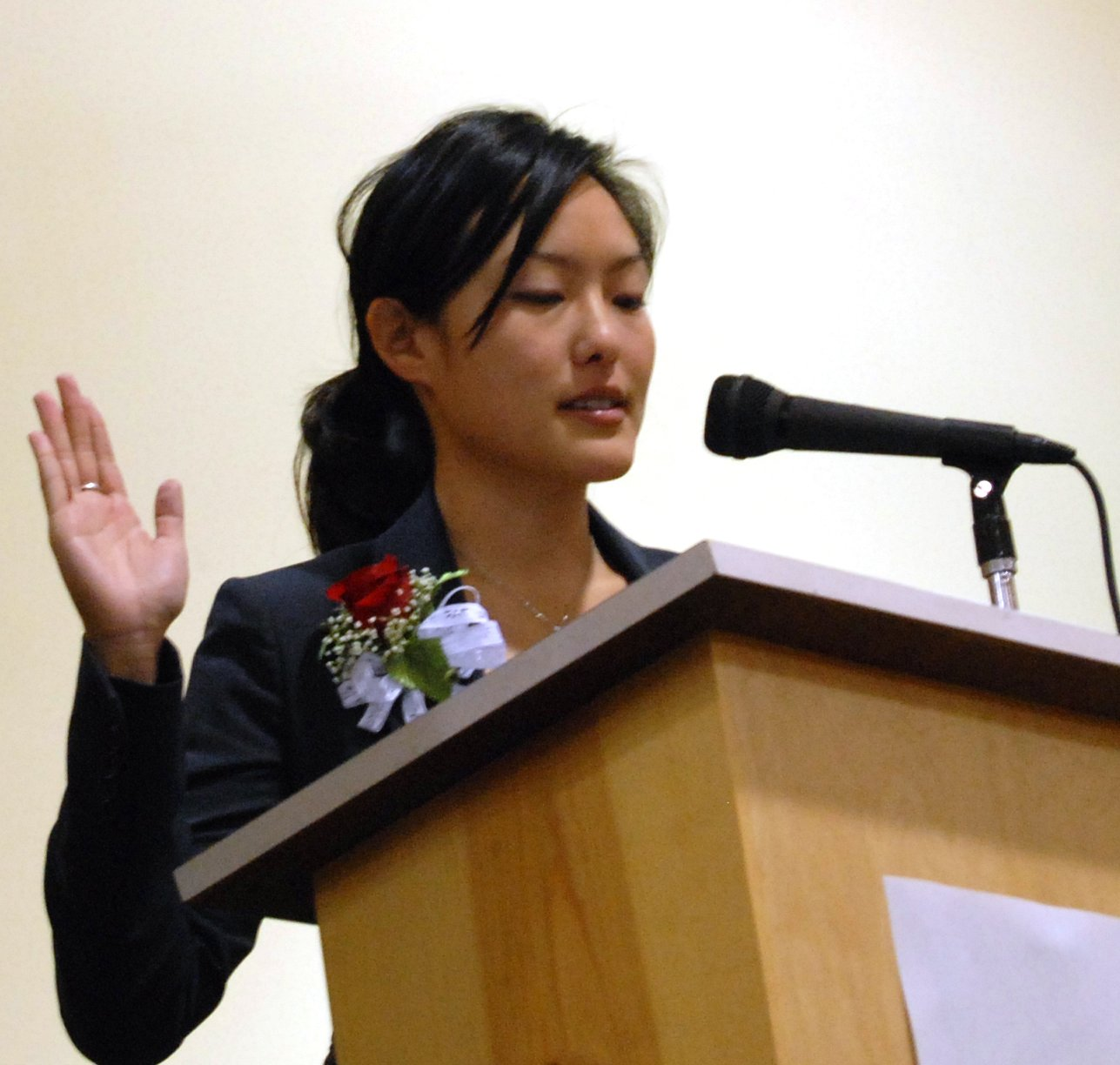
Kim joining the San Francisco Board of Education. She became the first Korean American elected official in the city's history.

In 2003 while campaigning for Green Party mayoral candidate Matt Gonzalez, Kim observed that Asian Americans were not well represented in San Francisco politics despite the size of its population. In 2004, she decided to run for the San Francisco Board of Education. In a field of 12 candidates seeking four seats, Kim came in seventh place; her bid failed in part because she was a member of the minority Green Party and did not have the backing of the Democratic Party. In 2006, Kim mounted a stronger campaign and she came in first in a field of 15 candidates seeking three seats. Kim was the top vote getter in every district except Marina/Cow Hollow, West of Twin Peaks and Castro/Noe Valley. In 2007, she became the first Korean American elected official in San Francisco. Kim's election was part of a more liberal shift in the school board joining Fellow Green Mark Sanchez, Eric Mar, and Kim-Shree Maufas.

In 2006, the school board took up the issue of whether to continue the 90-year-old Junior Reserve Officers' Training Corps (JROTC) program in San Francisco high schools. The board voted to phase out the JROTC program over two years. In December 2006, previous to taking office, Kim learned about a death threat against her that was sent from a JROTC cadet to his friend on Facebook. The cadet had also used MySpace to threaten a high school girl who argued prominently against JROTC. Kim spoke to the cadet herself and reported that he sincerely regretted his actions. Kim took the position that the JROTC program should not be hosted by San Francisco as long as the U.S. military continued its "don't ask, don't tell" policy. In June 2008 Kim and Norman Yee submitted a proposal to accept JROTC programs as optional after-school activities, without giving students physical education (P.E.) credit toward graduation. In October, Kim proposed an alternative program called Student Emergency Response Volunteers (SERV) that would train students in emergency preparedness and disaster relief. The bid to remove or replace JROTC failed in a 3–4 vote held in May 2009.

In March 2008, Kim and Sanchez traveled to Israel as members of the U.S. Green Party to investigate whether the party should continue to support the Boycott, Divestment and Sanctions program targeting Israel for its occupation of Palestine. Kim complimented a youth village program near Haifa, recommending its director be brought to San Francisco to help train educators.

Kim re-registered with the Democratic Party in 2008 after Barack Obama was elected president.

In 2010, she was elected president of the Board of Education. As board president, Kim had to negotiate statewide budget cuts that resulted in a two-year shortfall of $113 million for San Francisco schools. She authored and led the first district-wide Restorative Justice Program to address the disproportionate suspension and expulsions of African American students and won a pilot to establish ethnic studies classes in all San Francisco public high schools. Kim stated that the program will “be a cost savings to the district if we’re able to retain more students” and that there is “flexibility to find funding” in a budget of $400 million.

== San Francisco Supervisor ==
Kim had lived in various neighborhoods of San Francisco, including Polk Gulch and the Sunset. She moved to District 6 in 2009 and subsequently ran in the San Francisco Board of Supervisors election to fill the seat being vacated by Supervisor Chris Daly. District 6 includes Union Square, Tenderloin, Civic Center, Mid-Market, Cathedral Hill, South of Market, South Beach, Mission Bay, Treasure Island, Yerba Buena Island, and Alcatraz. Kim announced her candidacy in January 2010, then she kicked off her campaign in June, at a party attended by former mayors Art Agnos and Willie Brown, as well as the President of the Board of Supervisors, David Chiu, who knew Kim from having shared housing for more than two years. Kim ran against several candidates, including Theresa Sparks, who was endorsed by mayor Gavin Newsom, and liberal Debra Walker, who was endorsed by the Democratic Party and most labor unions. When Brown contributed $5000 to the Kim campaign, some of her progressive supporters questioned whether Kim was being supported by a political machine. Kim's campaign was seen as having the approval of Rose Pak, but the California Democratic machine of the 1960s and '70s was "dormant".

Kim won the race for supervisor in an upset victory. When she was sworn in she became the first Korean American supervisor in the nation. She told KoreAm magazine that without the backing of labor unions and the media, and with her own Democratic Party endorsing her opponent, the only strategy she had available was the "old-fashioned" one of visiting as many constituents as possible. This was called Kim's "Fifty-Nine Precinct Strategy" (referring to Howard Dean's fifty-state strategy) because of the many neighborhoods of the district that were targeted. Less support came from the Korean community, who participated little in the election, than from Chinese American supporters, especially senior citizens in Chinatown, and a broad base of San Francisco youth.

=== Pledge of Allegiance ===
Kim stood up during the Pledge of Allegiance at Board of Supervisors meetings but refused to recite it in keeping with the decision she had made in her youth. Within a few weeks of being sworn in, her silence gained the attention of local and national news media. She said in 2011 that the words "liberty and justice for all" were not yet a reality for many in the United States including communities of color, the LGBT community, immigrants and women. Kim said she was committed to "helping our nation achieve those ideals." On July 10, 2013, following the Supreme Court decision in United States v. Windsor, declaring unconstitutional the federal Defense of Marriage Act (DOMA), Kim recited the Pledge along with the other supervisors. Kim said that, for her, DOMA had "symbolized th[e] inequity" of American justice.

=== Twitter tax break ===
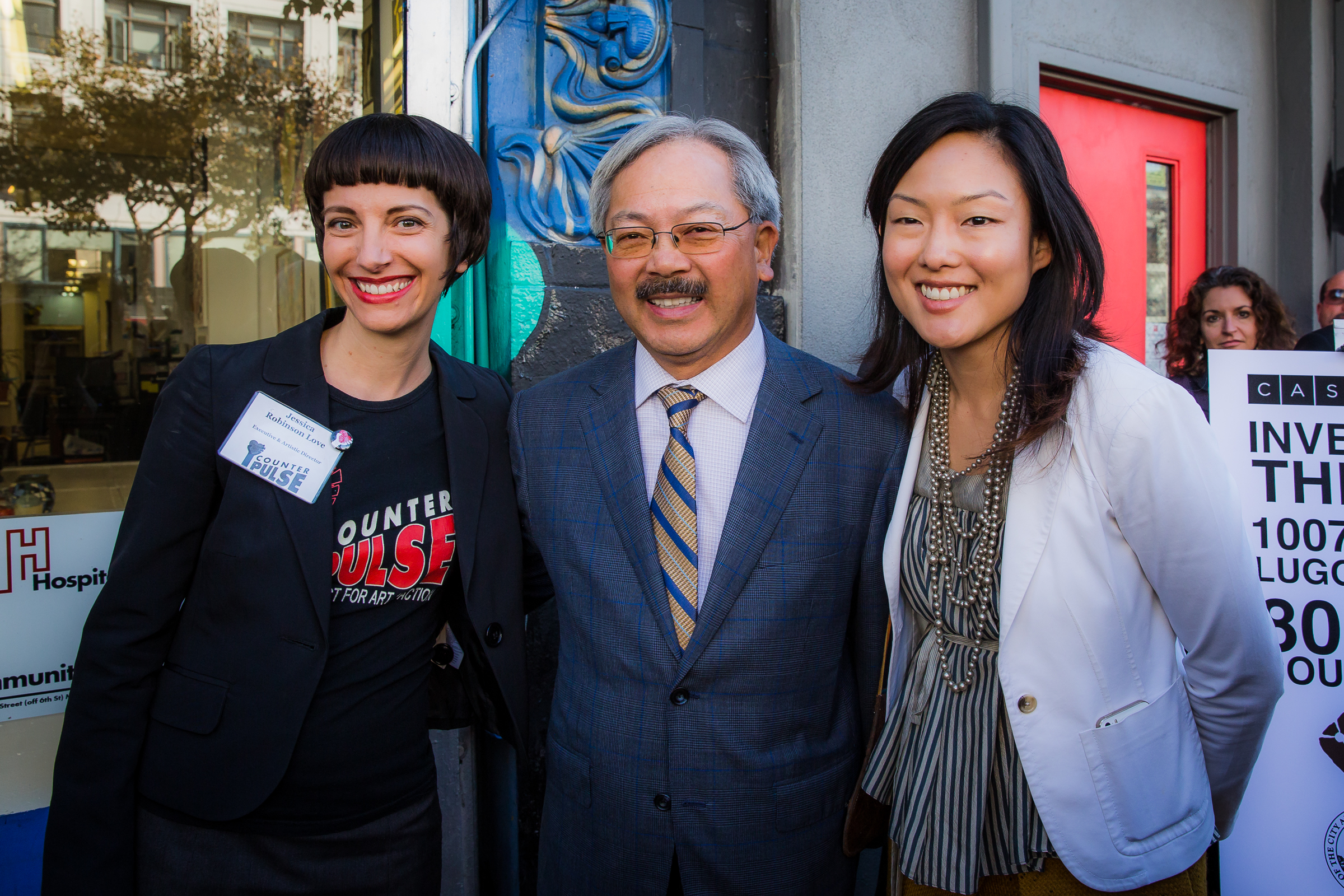
Mayor Ed Lee and Supervisor Kim pose with Jessica Robinson Love, left

Twitter is an online social networking service that was headquartered in District 6 on Folsom Street when Kim took office. In January 2011, Twitter announced it was considering moving a few miles south to the city of Brisbane because the company was expanding and needed ten times more space. Mayor Ed Lee indicated that he wanted Twitter to stay, so Kim led a team made up of mayoral staffers and Supervisor David Chiu to quickly shape a proposal which she sponsored in early February: Twitter would benefit from a six-year payroll tax exemption on net new jobs if it moved into the neglected and distressed mid-Market Street neighborhood of Kim's district. Talks centered on the company moving to the old Furniture Mart, a large Art Deco office building vacant since 2008. Kim's tax break proposal would apply to any large company willing to settle in the economically depressed area. Observers felt that this, Kim's first proposal as supervisor, signaled a break with her previous progressive record, to show a pro-business aspect. Former supervisor Chris Daly was critical; he said the plan could not help the city's budget shortfall, a serious problem resulting in jobs and services being cut. Agreeing with this assessment, Local 1021 of the Service Employees International Union (SEIU) also opposed the plan. Other businesses expressed anger that they would be unable to take advantage of the tax break. The city Controller's Office reported that the difference between Twitter leaving entirely or moving to mid-Market with the tax break was possibly worth $54 million in added revenue spread over 20 years.

In April 2011, the Board of Supervisors voted to approve the payroll tax exemption plan. Two weeks later, Twitter signed a ten-year lease on the Furniture Mart building. The Twitter tax break remained a defining issue in the San Francisco mayoral election of 2011: Incumbent Lee supported the exemption while challenger John Avalos criticized it. Lee retained his seat in the election. By June 2012, Twitter had settled 800 employees into the new location renamed Market Square, and Kim was invited to visit. She posted a photo of Twitter's new "micro health kitchen". Other tech companies such as Spotify and Yammer took advantage of the payroll tax exemption plan.

=== Sheriff controversy ===
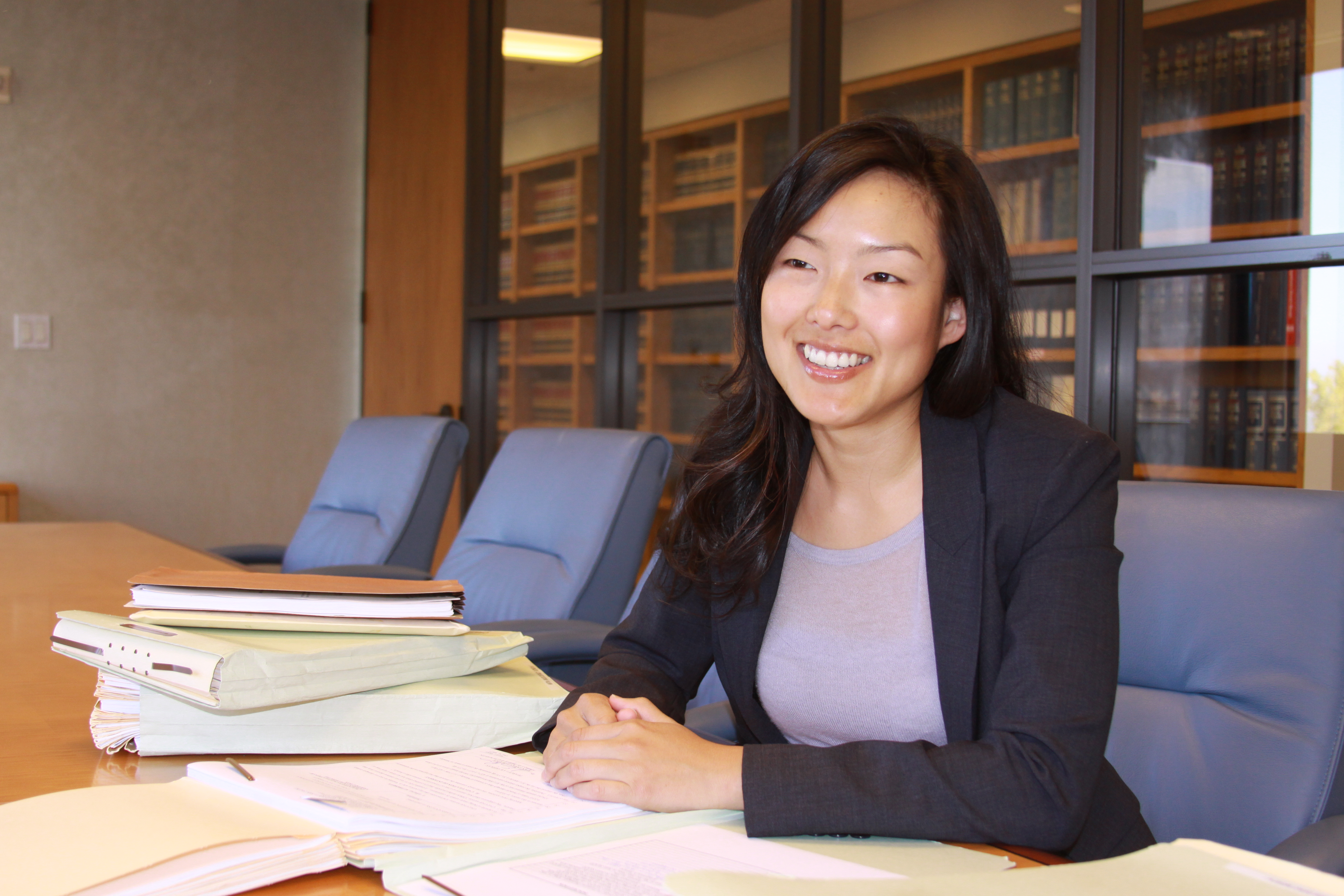
Kim earned a law degree from UC Berkeley School of Law

In 2010, Supervisor Ross Mirkarimi represented District 5, which shared a border with District 6. Mirkarimi, a fellow ex-Green Party member and progressive politician, accompanied Kim one day during her District 6 door-to-door campaigning in the border area.

Mirkarimi was elected sheriff in 2011, but he was soon embroiled in a controversy regarding violence allegations that he had restrained his wife by grabbing and bruising her arm. For this he was suspended by Mayor Lee. About two out of three San Franciscans polled said they thought Mirkarimi should not be reinstated as sheriff. Despite this popular sentiment, in October 2012, Mirkarimi was reinstated through the votes of four progressive supervisors: Kim, Avalos, David Campos and Christina Olague. Kim said she voted to reinstate Mirkarimi because his wrongdoing was less than that described by the city charter as grounds for removal. On the other hand, she said she would support a recall election to remove Mirkarimi by popular vote. San Francisco Chronicle columnist C. W. Nevius criticized Kim's position as that of a "political weathervane," unworthy of a leader. San Francisco Bay Guardian editor Steven T. Jones was more supportive, describing how Kim was persistent in questioning Deputy City Attorney Sherri Kaiser to determine what misdemeanor might be considered too small for the mayor to dismiss any elected official. Kim explained to her supporters that her decision was based on Mirkarimi not abusing the power of his office to commit wrongdoing, a point required by the city charter. She also expressed her worry that the case would have set a precedent allowing the mayor too much power over elected officials. SF Weekly columnist Joe Eskenazi suggested that Kim's support for Mirkarimi kept her out of the running for president of the board of supervisors in 2014.

=== Street renaming ===
In March 2013, after Polish labor organizer Lech Wałęsa made anti-gay remarks, Kim announced that she would seek to rename San Francisco's tiny Lech Walesa Street. The narrow one-way street was originally named Ivy Street but was changed in 1983 to honor Wałęsa. Kim suggested that Gay Games co-founder Tom Waddell be honored instead of Wałęsa, especially since the Tom Waddell Health Center was at that location. The San Francisco Board of Supervisors voted unanimously to change the name as Kim proposed.

=== Bicycling ===
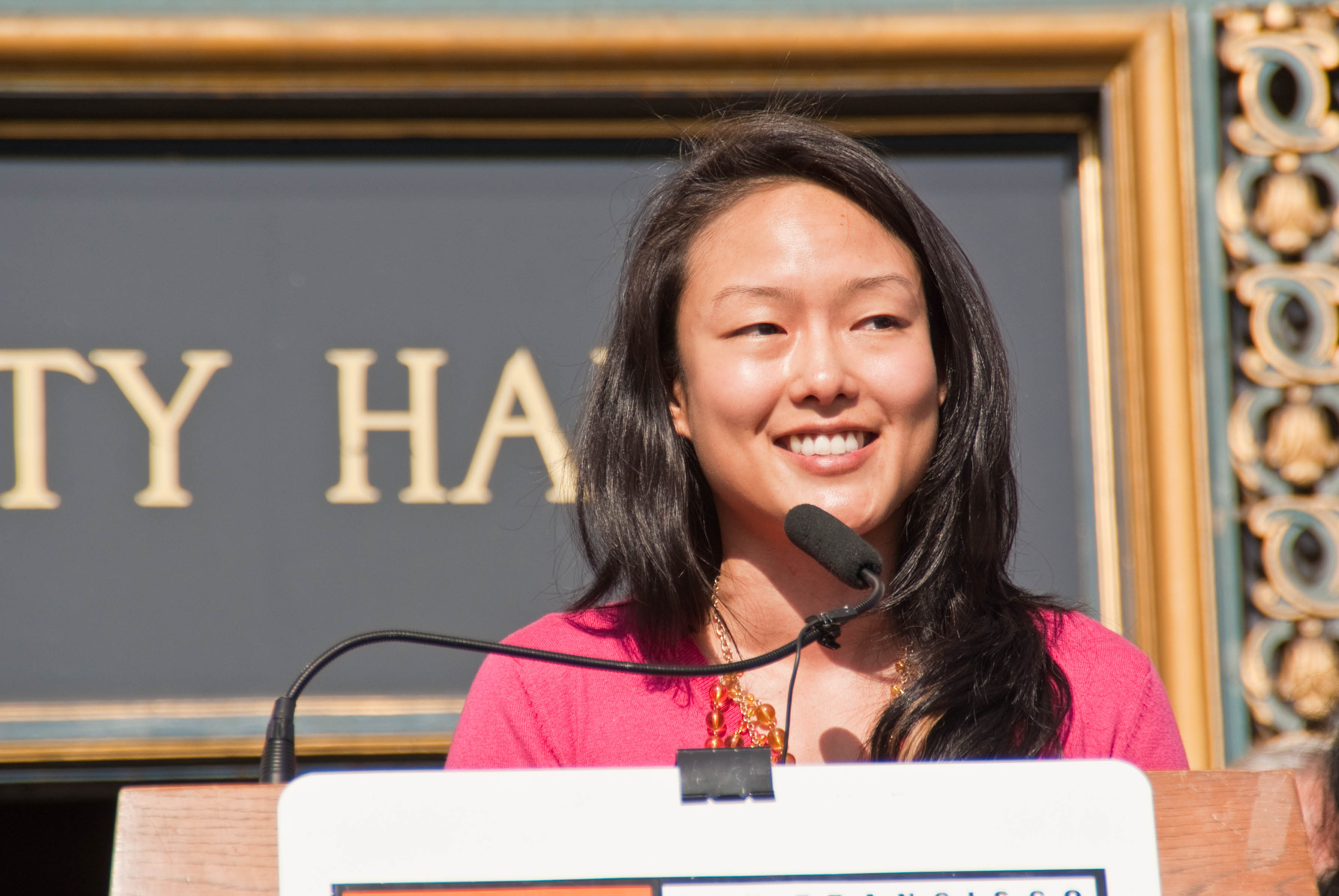
Kim speaking in front of City Hall on Bike-to-Work Day in 2010

Kim has tackled several issues regarding the use of bicycles in San Francisco. While serving on the Board of Education, she supported new bike racks for eight middle schools, and she promoted Bike-to-School Day. Though she never rode a bike in her childhood or at college, Kim told the San Francisco Bicycle Coalition in 2010 that she had been introduced to the city's "bike culture" and was slowly learning how to ride, a process that heightened her awareness of bicycle safety concerns. In 2011, Bike-to-Work Day she rode as a passenger on the rear of an extended bike, but on May 10, 2012, she pedaled herself to City Hall. With Mayor Lee, Kim backed the Yerba Buena Street Life Plan which was announced in 2011 for the area around Yerba Buena Gardens in District 6. The plan included new bike paths and more bike parking. In September 2013 when the San Francisco Police Department was criticized for its investigation of a cyclist fatality that happened the previous month, Kim requested a hearing to discuss improvements for such police procedures. Along with Supervisors Yee and Avalos, in January 2014 Kim called for the city to adopt a multifaceted bicycle and pedestrian safety initiative modeled after the Swedish Vision Zero program. Kim ushered the most protected bike lanes, 18.6 miles, of any San Francisco Supervisor during her time.

=== Environmental impact appeals reform ===
San Francisco supervisors had previously tried unsuccessfully to reform the process by which a citizen could use the 1970 California Environmental Quality Act (CEQA) appeals process to challenge a building project on the basis of its environmental impact. In 2012 Supervisor Scott Wiener proposed new rules that would restrict such challenges. Bicycling advocate Ben Christopher was supportive of Wiener's proposal, citing one instance in 2005 when a single citizen held up the city's comprehensive bicycle plan. However, critics such as the Sierra Club said the proposed changes would weaken CEQA's protections. In April 2013 Kim proposed a competing set of reform rules which Eric Brooks of the Green Party reported as "more CEQA friendly." Wiener and Kim hammered out a proposal combining elements of both versions; this was passed unanimously by the Board in July 2013. Kim said the reformed rules would not prevent the public from "giving input" to construction projects.

=== Evictions ===
In September 2016, Kim authored the Evictions Protections 2.0 bill to protect tenants from "no fault" evictions, which had seen an uptick. This rise in "no fault" evictions coincided with a spike in market rent, causing landlords to evict tenants in rent controlled units in order to rent spaces at the higher market rate. 83% of the city's evictions were no fault evictions.

The ordinance prohibits landlords from evicting tenants for small infractions, dubbed “gotcha evictions,” such as leaving shoes or strollers in the hall, painting a bedroom, hanging laundry out to dry, etc. The bill also removed lease restrictions created by landlords on roommates that are less than the maximum number of persons permitted by applicable laws, such as the SF Housing Code.

The legislation was co-sponsored by Supervisors Campos, Mar, and Avalos and was passed on October 14, 2015.

=== Affordable housing ===
In April 2015, the San Francisco Giants and Mayor Lee announced a large community development proposal, Mission Rock, to replace the parking lots near AT&T Park, where the baseball team plays. The proposal required voter approval in November 2015. In May 2015, the Giants announced that 33% of the project would be devoted to affordable housing, to match Mayor Lee's goal for all new construction. Kim determined that a larger proportion of the project should be devoted to affordable housing, and she drafted a competing ballot initiative with the assistance of Tenants and Owners Development Corporation (TODCO), a non-profit community housing planning group. The danger of a competing ballot initiative brought the Giants to negotiate. Kim and the Giants worked out a deal to increase the project's affordable housing to 40%, and Kim dropped her own ballot initiative.

In 2021, Kim was involved in efforts to lobby against the construction of a 495-unit apartment complex on a parking lot next to a BART station in San Francisco which committed to 14.5% affordable units on-site for residents who make between 50-110% AMI (individuals who earn $45,000-93,000/year, unaffordable to low-income residents in South of Market and Tenderloin). The next year, a proponent of project filed an ethics complaint against her, alleging that she worked as a lobbyist for TODCO in opposing the housing project. Kim was reported to be a paid employee for TODCO, supplying TODCO-prepared materials to the Board of Supervisors. Kim responded that she advocated against the housing project on her own time. City ethics regulations bar ex-officials from lobbying on issues that they covered while in office.

=== Free tuition at community college ===
In April 2016, Kim proposed that tuition should be free at City College of San Francisco (CCSF), which had seen a 30% decline in students over the previous four years, had lost $35 million in state funding tied to attendance, and was in danger of losing its accreditation and more state funding. Some 20% of the college students had already been granted a fee waiver by the City of San Francisco; Kim said that these students should also have free books, transportation and child care. Vermont Senator Bernie Sanders, himself a proponent of free college tuition, voiced support for the idea. To pay for this idea, Kim authored a real estate tax initiative to raise taxes on real estate sales and transfers over $5 million, with the goal of increasing city revenue by about $45 million per year. Voters approved Kim's Proposition W at the ballot in November 2016. CCSF's accreditation was confirmed for seven more years starting in January 2017. The next month, Mayor Lee and Kim announced a deal through which the city would pay $5.4 million per year to CCSF students who had lived in San Francisco for at least one year, so that they could pay their tuition. The deal, called Free City, also provided $250 cash per semester for each low-income student who attended CCSF full-time, as well as $100 per semester for part-time students. The cash grants were for the students to pay for books, transportation, supplies, and health care. The Free City program was described by PBS as the first time that a US city made community college tuition free for all its residents. In September 2017 when the program began, enrollment at CCSF increased by 6,450 students, a "huge boost". Sanders spoke at CCSF to praise the successful program as "a model" for the whole country.

== California Insurance Comissioner ==
=== 2026 election ===
In January 2026, Kim announced her candidacy for California Insurance Commissioner, pledging not to accept contributions from insurance companies and their executives. Kim's platform includes proposals to establish a "Natural Disaster Insurance for All" program that would create a state-run risk pool funded by a portion of policyholder premiums, as well as a public insurer performance dashboard publishing denial rates and claims payment data for each insurer operating in California.

Critics have argued that Kim's lack of professional experience in the insurance industry is a liability. Kim has responded that the role is primarily political rather than technical, stating: "This role is ultimately a political role. We're not in the position we're in because we didn't elect an actuary." Kim received endorsements from U.S. Senator Bernie Sanders, U.S. Representative Ro Khanna, SEIU California, the California Teachers Association, and the UFCW Western States Council, among others. The Working Families Party, of which Kim was California Director until her campaign launch, committed to a statewide organizing effort in support of her candidacy.

In the June 2026 primary, Kim and state senator Ben Allen, both Democrats, advanced to the November general election. Kim proposed that California homeowners should be granted automatic universal home insurance for wildfire and disasters, and that California would operate a nonprofit state insurance agency. Allen's modestly progressive campaign benefited from $6.9 million spent to support him or to attack Kim, while Kim's campaign for radical change raised less than $1.3 million. On November 6, Allen conceded to Kim who had won approximately 53% of the vote. She will be the first woman in the role when she takes office in January 2027.

== Other elections ==
Kim ran for the 11th California State Senate District in 2016 against Scott Wiener. Kim received slightly more votes than Wiener in the primary election, but when the general election was held Kim was defeated by Wiener, 49% to 51%.

Kim was a candidate in the 2018 San Francisco special mayoral election, held in June 2018 following the sudden death of Mayor Lee in December 2017. Kim was seen as one of the top four candidates, along with Mark Leno, London Breed and Angela Alioto. She received 24% of the vote in the election, finishing in third place. Because the election was conducted with ranked voting, most of Kim's votes were apportioned to the remaining two candidates in Round 8, with two-thirds of Kim voters choosing Leno as their next alternative, and one-fifth of Kim voters choosing Breed. The larger Kim apportionment to Leno did not overturn the strong lead taken early by Breed, and Breed was elected mayor.

== Personal life and media coverage ==
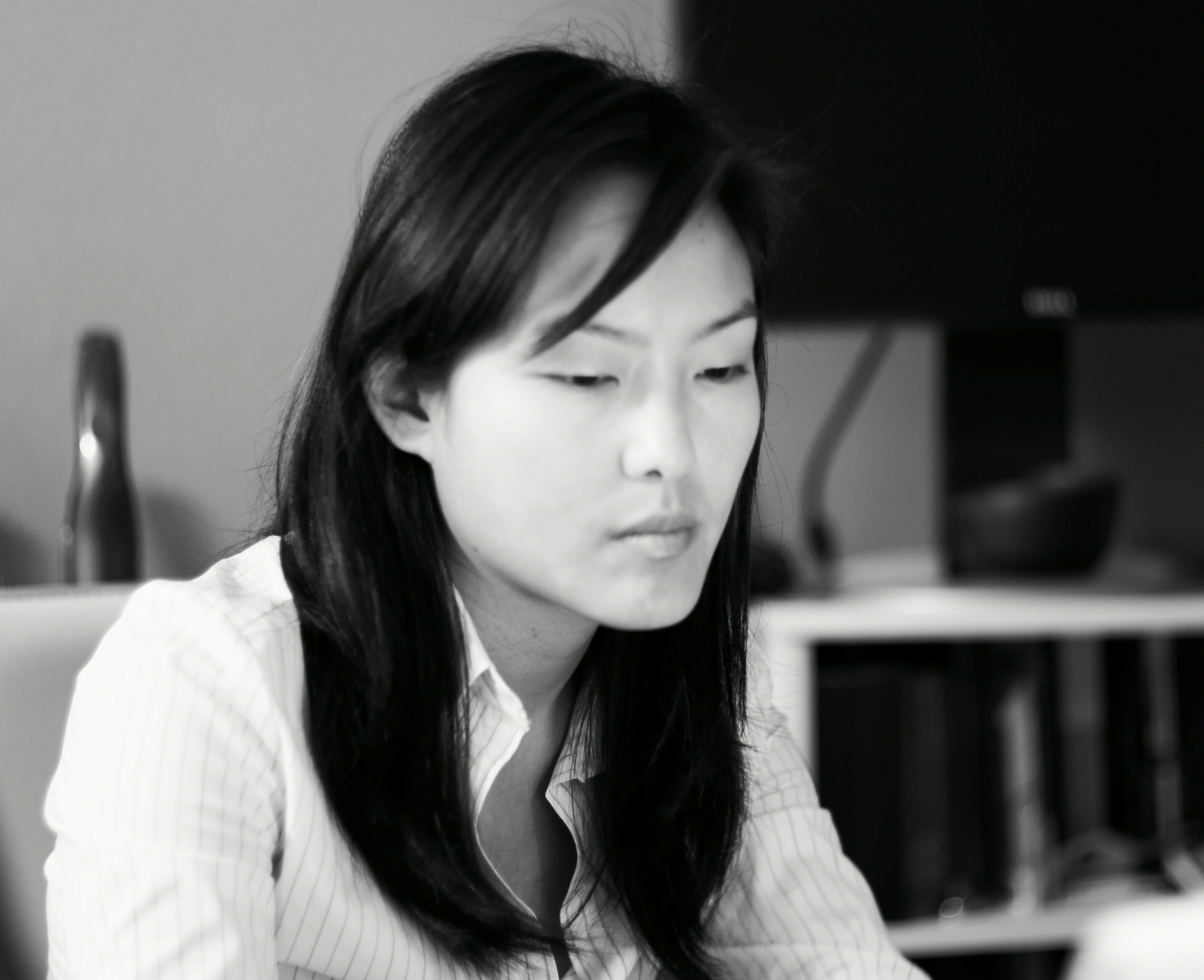
Kim in 2007

Kim plays electric bass guitar and has performed with the all-female indie rock band Strangely at small San Francisco venues including the Brainwash Cafe and Laundromat. In 2000 she co-founded Locus Arts in San Francisco's Japantown, a non-profit gallery and media performance space formed to support Asian American art; the gallery eventually merged with Kearny Street Workshop. For the Asian American Theater Company she served on the board of directors. She helped to save Bindlestiff Studio, a place for Filipino arts in SoMa. Kim occasionally serves as a judge at poetry slam competitions held by Youth Speaks. In 2004 she said her favorite musical artists included the Quannum Projects, a collective of hip-hop musicians such as rapper Lyrics Born and hip-hop duo Blackalicious. In 2010 she said her favorite song was "Triumph" released in 1997 by the Wu-Tang Clan.

Kim was selected by 7x7 magazine as one of their "20 Hot 2010" persons in September 2010. She was pictured on the cover of SF Weekly in October 2010. Kim was featured on the cover of KoreAm magazine in February 2011. Nark magazine interviewed Kim in June 2012, asking her about her nightlife preferences. She said she appreciated the work of San Francisco Entertainment Commissioners who ease the friction between nightlife venues and local residents. Kim said wine and single-malt whiskey were drinks she enjoyed, especially Lagavulin.

In August 2016, Kim was reportedly dating California Supreme Court Associate Justice Goodwin Liu.
