= Bob's Donuts =

Donut shop in San Francisco, California

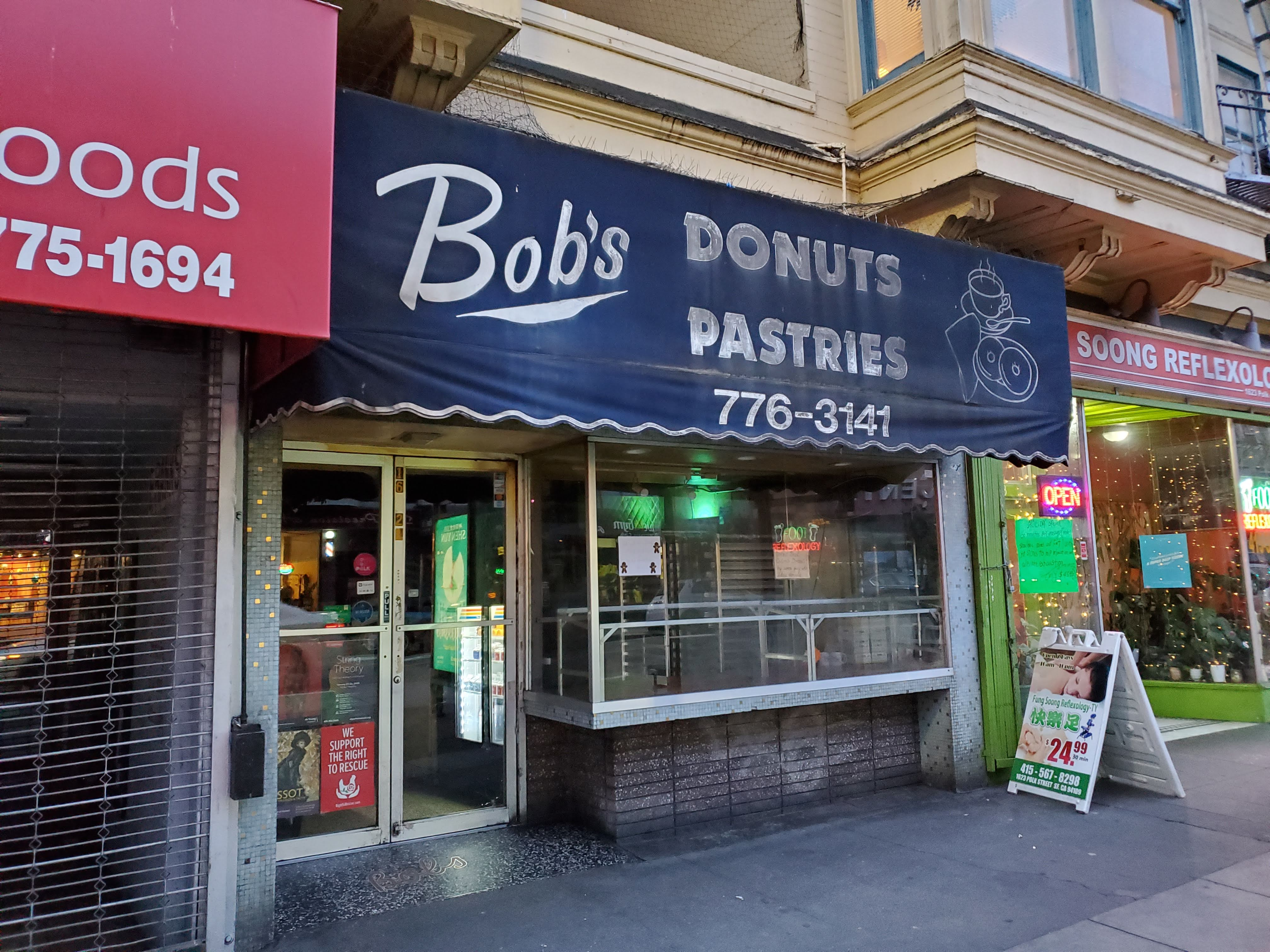
- Original location storefront at 1621 Polk Street, 2019
- Type: Private
- Industry: Food and Drink
- Founded: 1953–1960 (sources differ)
- Headquarters: 1720 Polk Street, San Francisco, United States
- Website: bobsdonutssf.com

Bob's Donuts and Pastries is a chain of three donut shops based in the San Francisco area. Founded in 1953, the business is known for its always-open Polk Street location. The shop has two locations in San Francisco and Mill Valley.

== About ==
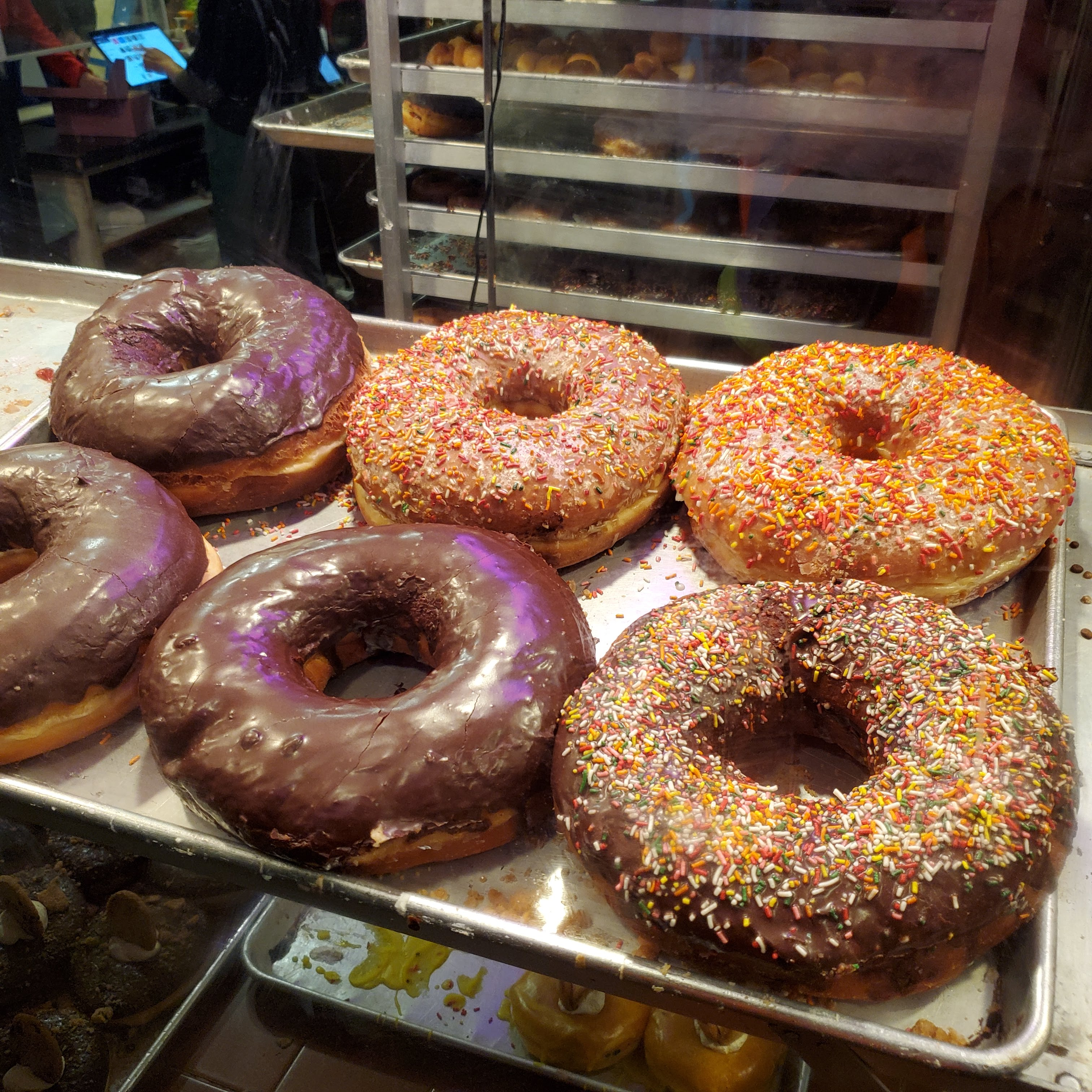
Big donut used for Bob's Donut Challenge. It is the size of 12 regular donuts.

The location on Polk Street is open 24 hours and is popular at night with nightlife goers. The store offers a "Bob's Donut Challenge", a timed contest to eat a giant doughnut that's the size of twelve regular donuts in under three minutes. Winners of the challenge can add their name to a Hall of Fame and win a T-shirt.

== History ==
Bob's Donuts opened in 1953 or 1960 (Note: The opening year is contested. The San Francisco Examiner states that the store opened at its 1621 Polk Street address in 1960. KTVU states that the store opened in the 1950's. The company itself claims 1960. According to the Bechky 2024 "S.F.’s most treasured doughnut shop is leaving its 70-year-old location", the historical phone books list the business as open in 1953.) on 1621 Polk Street in San Francisco. The original owner is not totally confirmed, but a city report suggests the it to be Robert N. Nolt, who owned several businesses on the street. The shop was purchased by Elinor and Ronald Ahn in 1977.

After Elinor Ahn died in 2001, ownership went to her son and daughter-in-law. Aya Ahn is one of the co-owners.

Around 2012, the store developed the Doughnut Challenge to eat a giant donut, equivalent in volume to twelve regular donuts, in three minutes.

In 2019, Bob's Donuts opened a second location on 601 Baker Street in San Francisco.

In 2022, Bob's Donuts opened a third location on 252 Almonte Boulevard in Mill Valley. A fourth location was reported in San Jose, but as of 2025, it has not opened.

In 2021, the owners purchased a property across the street from their original location, at 1720 Polk Street. In 2023, they announced plans to expand to that location; however, it was illegal to merge the two storefronts on that property until Supervisor Aaron Peskin sponsored and passed specific exempting legislation. The new location opened in 2025. The owner's frustrations with the city health department were held as an example of a hostile environment between the city bureaucracy and small businesses. The city updated its health inspection process to make the process easier for small businesses.

In 2024, the owners announced plans to close their original location in San Francisco after failing to reach an agreement with the landlord to renew the lease. The original location held its last day of sales on November 23, 2025.

Bob's Donuts was placed on the San Francisco Legacy Business Registry in 2024.

== Critical response ==
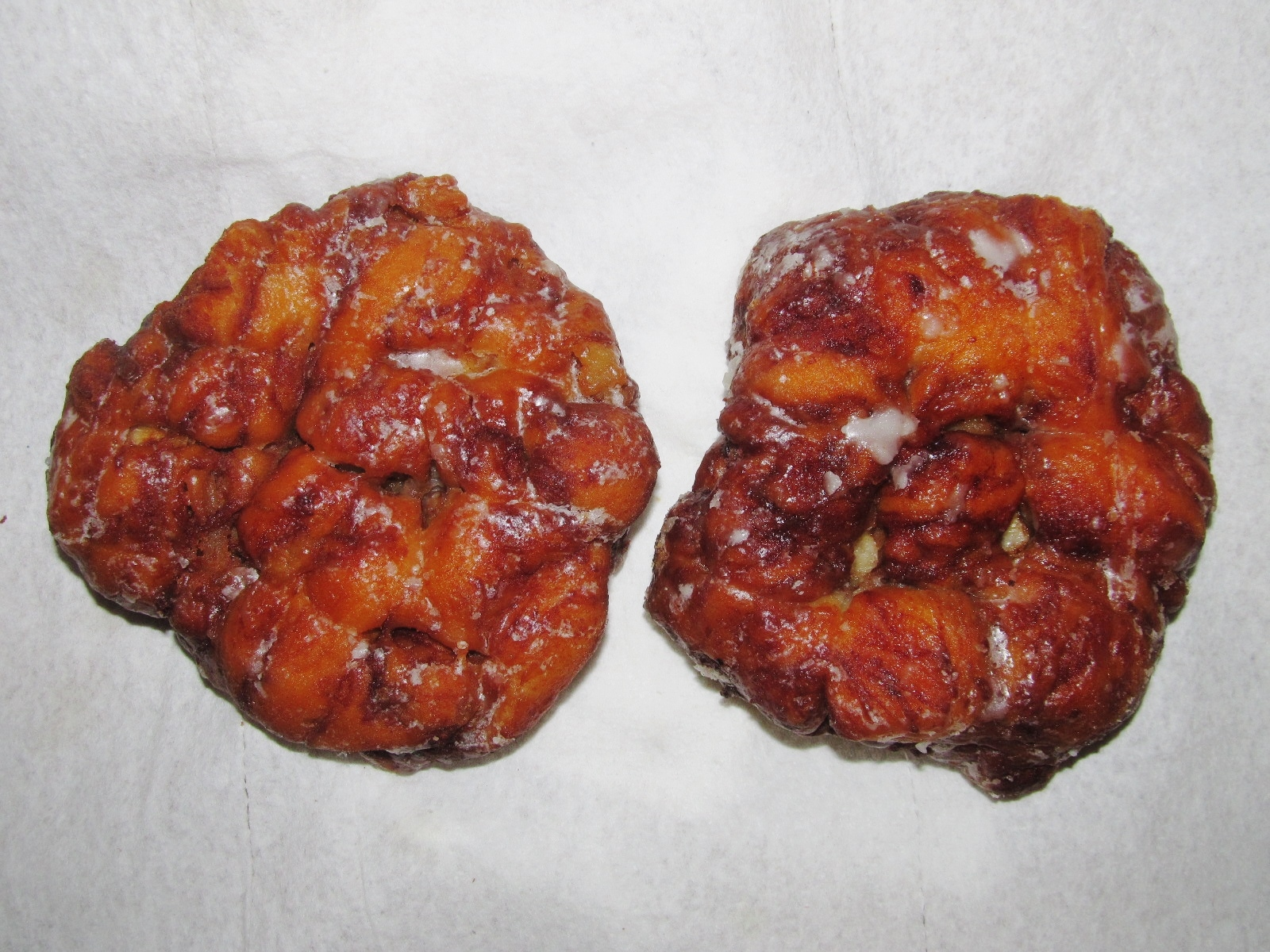
Apple fritter from Bob's Donuts

In 1991, San Francisco Chronicle food critic Patricia Unterman gave the store a two-star "very good" review. A 1992 capsule review noted "fresh, cleanly fried doughnuts with texture and loft." According to the Chronicle, the review popularized the store.

At SFGate in 2022, food reporter Madeline Wells wrote that Bob's Donuts was "the jewel of San Francisco, whether you’re a lifelong local or a tourist," and described the apple fritter as "a pleasing textural contrast of crispy glaze, light and fluffy interior, and gooey chunks of cinnamon-y apple."

== In other media ==
In 2023, Bob's Donuts was the focus of a short film, Circle of Donuts, which screened at the Mill Valley Film Festival in 2023.

Bob's Donuts is featured in a 2025 children's book called Bob's Donuts for Breakfast.
