= Julie Christensen (politician) =

American politician

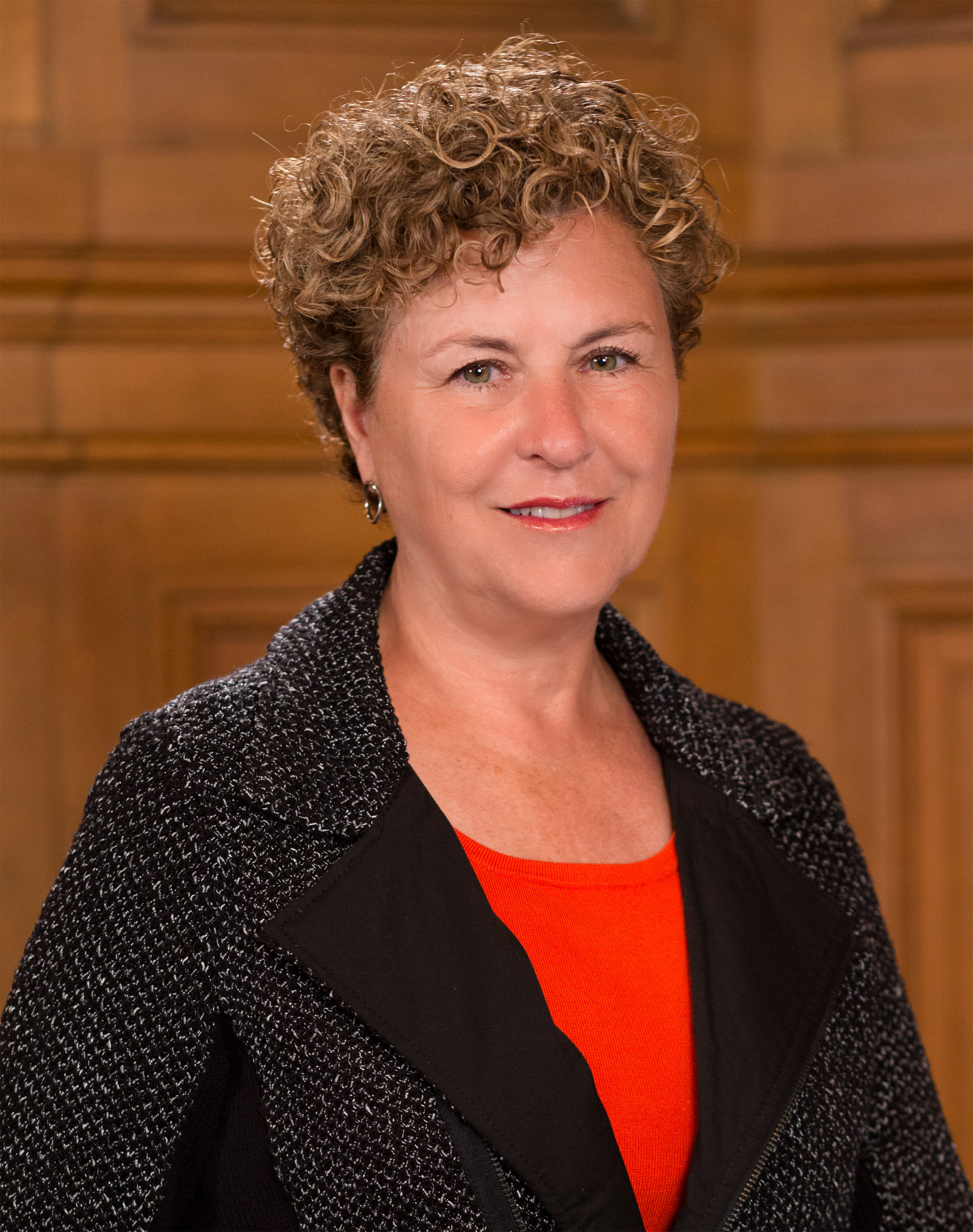
- Official portrait, 2015

Member of the San Francisco Board of Supervisors from District 3
- In office January 8, 2015 – December 8, 2015
- Preceded by: David Chiu
- Succeeded by: Aaron Peskin

Personal details
- Born: Julienne Christensen
- Occupation: Politician

Julienne "Julie" Christensen is an American politician, who served on the San Francisco Board of Supervisors from January 2015 to December 2015, representing District 3.

== Biography ==
After studying sculpture, painting, and pre-law, Christensen worked for design firm Skidmore, Owings & Merrill in San Francisco before starting her own firm, Surface Work, in 1981. Among her designs is the color of the KitchenAid candy apple red mixer.

== Political career ==
In January 2015, Christensen was appointed by San Francisco Mayor Ed Lee to fill the District 3 supervisorial vacancy left by former Board of Supervisors President David Chiu upon his election to the California State Assembly. In the closely fought supervisorial election in December 2015, she was defeated by Aaron Peskin, who had previously held the seat from 2001 until 2009. During the election campaign, Julie Christensen used the word "wormhole" — a hypothetical structure connecting two different points in spacetime — to describe the Stockton Street Tunnel connecting Union Square and Chinatown. Peskin's ally Rose Pak claimed the word "wormhole" implied Chinese people were no better than worms, drawing negative press that allowed Peskin to gain votes from Chinese community members.

She has also served on the advisory board for SPUR and is an active proponent of extending San Francisco's Central Subway to North Beach.

Christensen currently serves as the executive director of the Dogpatch and Northwest Potrero Hill Green Benefit District.
