= Rose Pak =

American political activist (1947–2016)

Rose Lan Pak
- 白蘭
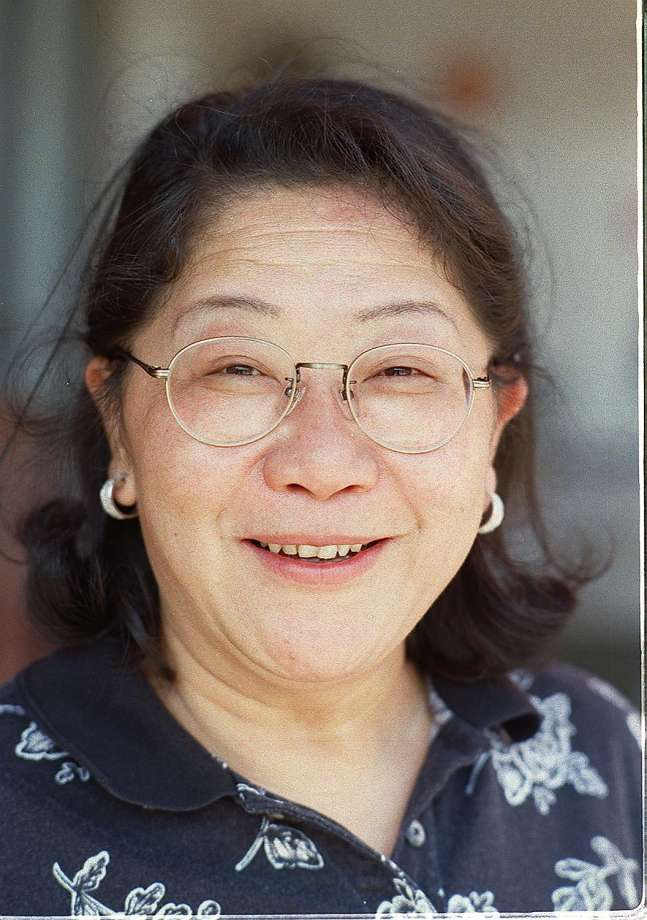
- Rose Pak in 1999
- Born: November 25, 1947; Henan, China
- Died: September 18, 2016 (aged 68); San Francisco, California, US
- Occupations: journalist, political activist
- Years active: 1972–2016

Rose Lan Pak (simplified Chinese: 白兰; traditional Chinese: 白蘭; pinyin: Bái Lán; Jyutping: Baak6 Laan4, November 25, 1947 – September 18, 2016) was a political activist in San Francisco, California, noted for her influence on city politics and power in the Chinatown community. Pak served as a consultant for the San Francisco Chinese Chamber of Commerce and organizer of the Chinese New Year Parade in San Francisco.

Although Pak never held an elective political office, she was known as an outspoken, controversial but well-connected "gatekeeper" figure who supported politicians by raising funds and connecting them with the city's growing Asian American community. Her political ties to the Chinese government attracted scrutiny.

== Early life ==
Pak was born on November 27, 1947, in Henan, China, though Pak has also given her birthplace as Hengyang, Hunan, to Yun Shan Pak and Anna Wong. She received a Catholic education while growing up as a refugee in Portuguese Macau and British Hong Kong after her father, a businessman, had died in the Chinese Civil War. When she was 17, she received a scholarship to attend the San Francisco College for Women and in 1972, earned a master's degree at the Columbia School of Journalism. After a brief stint working at The New York Times, she returned to San Francisco in 1974 to work for the San Francisco Chronicle (as its first female Asian American journalist), a job that she left after eight years to become a full-time social activist.

== Political career ==
Pak's first objective as an activist was to organize a campaign to save the San Francisco Chinese Hospital from closure. Later she worked for decades to advocate for its replacement by a new, modern building, and for the Central Subway project that improved Chinatown's connection to the rest of the Bay Area. Both projects broke ground in 2013.

Pak was a supporter of Art Agnos (the city's mayor from 1988 to 1992) but opposed his efforts to tear down the Embarcadero Freeway, arguing that Chinatown would suffer catastrophic consequences if it lost the fast crosstown connection. She won a ballot measure about the issue in 1987, but after the 1989 Loma Prieta earthquake damaged the freeway, her objections were overturned. According to the San Francisco Chronicle, Pak then "almost single-handedly persuaded the city to build" the $1.5 billion Central Subway project to compensate Chinatown for the demolition of the freeway.

According to Claire Jean Kim, Pak and Chinatown power broker Pius Lee were "famously at odds."

In 1996, Pak lobbied for the appointment of Fred H. Lau as the first Asian American head of the San Francisco Police Department. She threatened to withdraw support for the S.F. Giants' proposed Pac Bell Park if Mayor Brown didn't fire a political consultant hostile to Lau.

In 2011, Pak was instrumental in obtaining consensus to nominate Edwin M. Lee as the first Asian American mayor of San Francisco. Pak said, "This was finally our moment to make the first Chinese mayor of a major city."

In 2015, Pak and her ally Ed Lee had a falling out over Lee's choice of Julie Christensen as a replacement appointment to the Board of Supervisor instead of Pak's protege Cindy Wu. Pak went on to support her former longtime adversary Aaron Peskin against Christensen in the supervisor elections for District 3 (which includes Chinatown) later that year. When Christensen used the physics concept “wormhole”—a connection between two different space-times—to describe the Stockton Street Tunnel connecting Union Square and Chinatown, Pak distorted the word “wormhole” to imply that Chinatown is a hole of worms, which successfully triggered the anger of some Chinatown residents. Aaron Peskin ended up defeating Julie Christensen.

In the annual Chinese New Year's Parade, Pak was known for her outspoken comments about local politicians as they were passing by the central grandstand. As reported by the San Francisco Chronicle, Pak's quips "ranged from humorous to mean, but they were almost always pointed and pertinent to Chinatown’s interests".

Shortly before her death in 2016, Pak vehemently opposed a project to permanently convert parts of Stockton Street in the Union Square area outside of Chinatown into a pedestrian zone, arguing that Stockton Street was a "vital link" for Chinatown, and threatening to organize a blockade of City Hall by thousands of vehicles if the idea came to pass.

=== Political ties to the People's Republic of China ===
Pak was an overseas executive director of the China Overseas Exchange Association (COEA), a united front organization overseen by the Overseas Chinese Affairs Office (OCAO), at the time under the State Council of the People's Republic of China. At various times she spoke out in favor of the Chinese government's views, e.g. in 2012 calling all "overseas Chinese" to "defend the homeland” in the conflict about the Diaoyu Islands, and in 2008 opposing a resolution of the SF Board of Supervisors that criticized China for the 1989 Tiananmen Square protests and massacre and other repression measures, passed on occasion of the 2008 Summer Olympics torch relay reaching San Francisco. As revealed in a 2018 Politico report after Pak's death, among U.S. intelligence officials "there were widespread concerns that Pak had been co-opted by Chinese intelligence". These also extended to her work in organizing many "junket" trips to China for leading Bay Area politicians, exposing them to surveillance and recruitment efforts (although there is no evidence Pak directly participated in such efforts herself).

Pak was critical of the Falun Gong movement in San Francisco and in 2004 she banned the group from participating in the city's annual Chinese New Year's Parade. The group and others, including San Francisco Supervisor Chris Daly, subsequently alleged that Pak had connections to the Chinese Communist Party. Pak consistently denied any ties with Beijing.

=== Death ===
In May 2016, Pak returned to San Francisco after an extended medical stay in China, where she had received a kidney transplant, announcing to a welcoming committee of Chinatown elders, local politicians and city officials that her health had been restored. She died in San Francisco on September 18, 2016, aged 68. She was single all of her life and had no children.

Pak's funeral took place in September 2016, attended by many prominent San Francisco politicians, but her body was not cremated until three months later, due to a dispute between her two surviving sisters over the estate (estimated at $656,000, to the surprise of many observers, as Pak had had a reputation of being of little means).

== Legacy ==
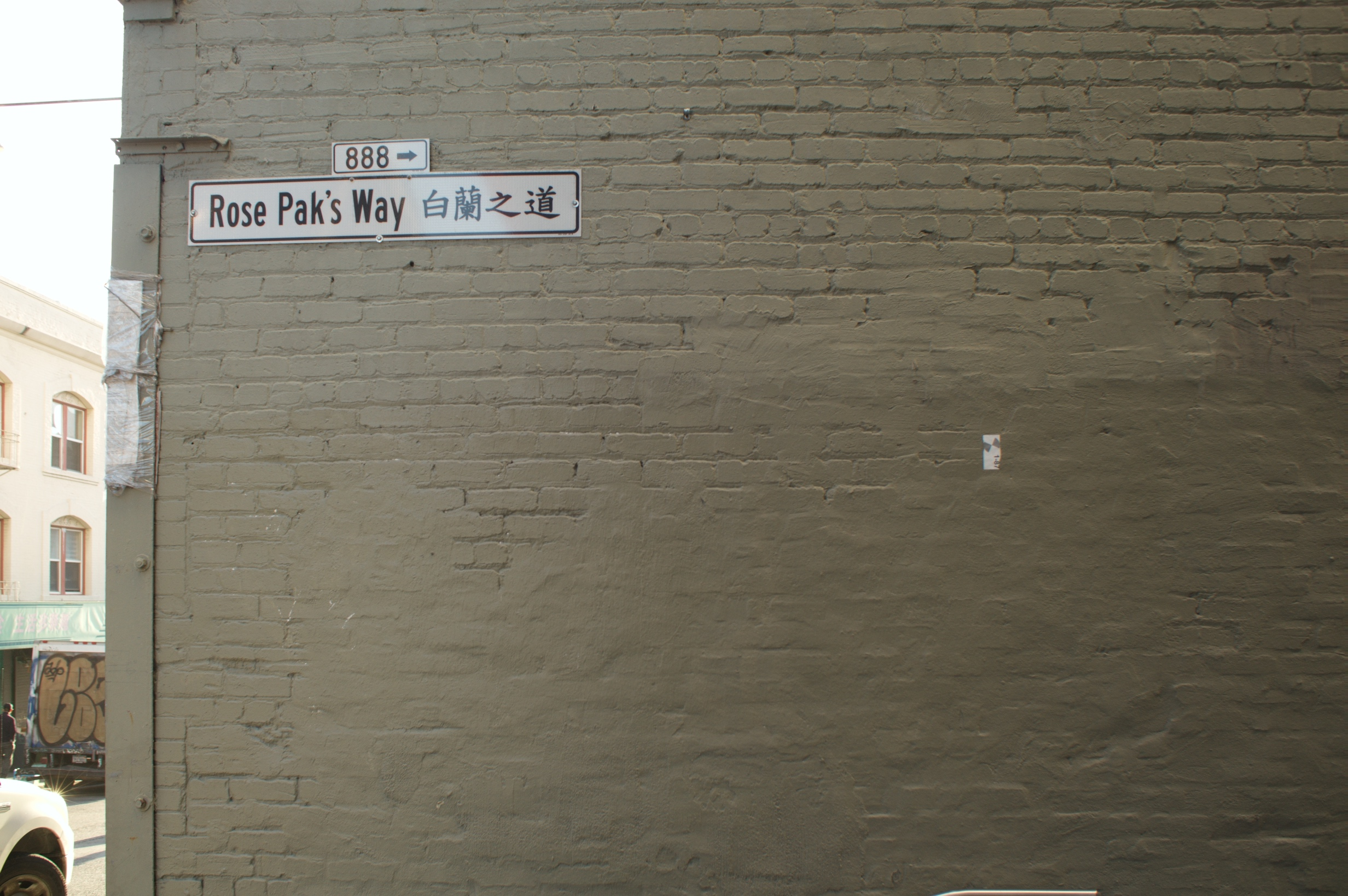
Rose Pak's Way

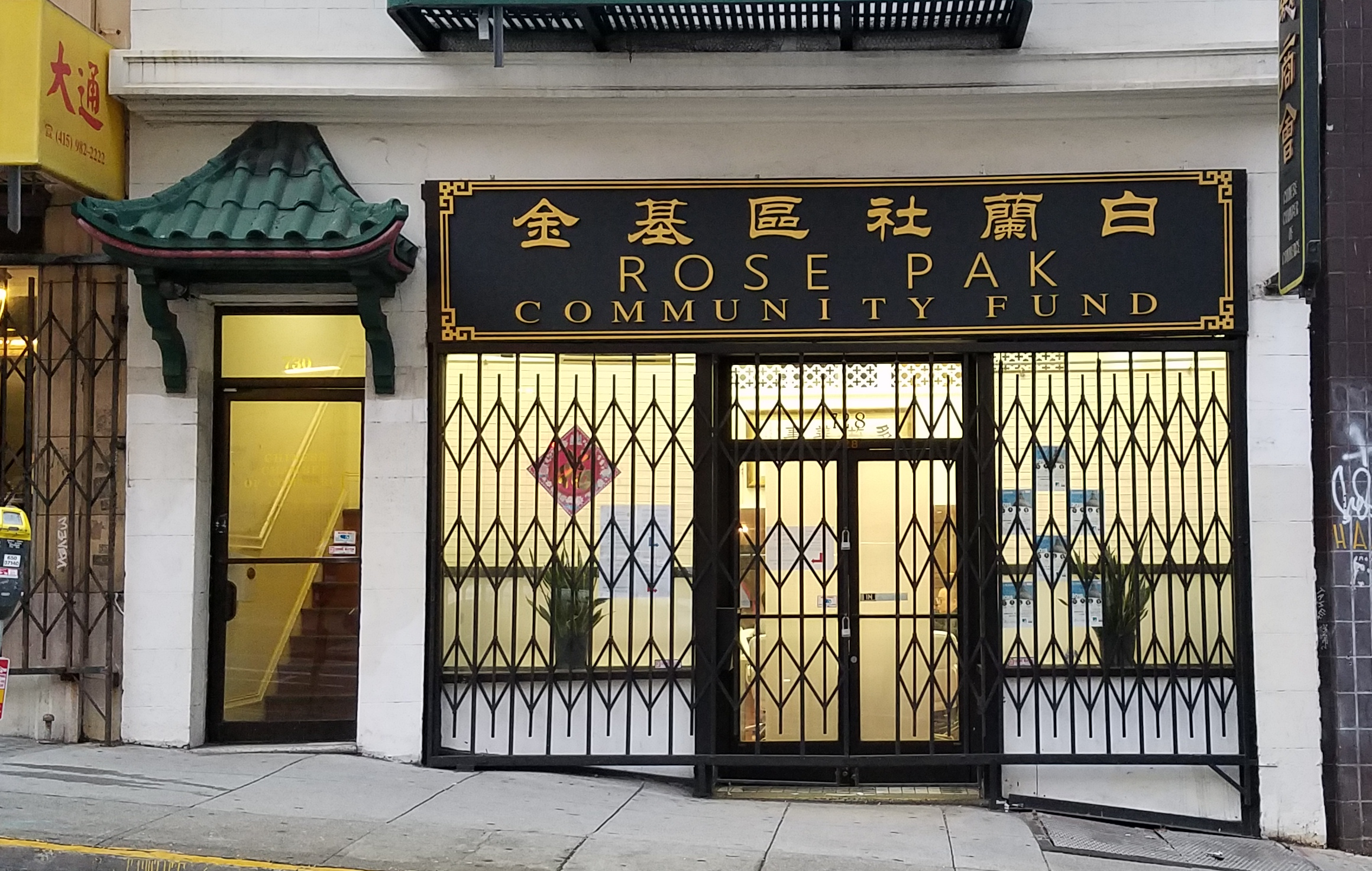
Facilities of the Rose Pak Community Fund on Sacramento Street in San Francisco's Chinatown

On the reopening of the Chinese Hospital at the end of April 2016, the city renamed an alley in Chinatown just east of the new tower in her honor to "Rose Pak's Way 白蘭之道".

In October 2016, a few weeks after her death, the San Francisco Board of Supervisors unanimously passed a resolution asking the SFMTA to name the future Chinatown subway station after Pak, which was met with protests by Falun Gong activists. On August 20, 2019, the Board of Supervisors for the San Francisco Municipal Transportation Agency voted to rename the Muni Metro Chinatown station to "Chinatown–Rose Pak station." The issue had been deferred from an earlier meeting in June, when the Board split 3–3 on the renaming proposal due to one board member's absence.

In March 2017, the city planted a ginkgo biloba tree in Pak's honor in Saint Mary's Square.

On the first anniversary of Pak's death in September 2017, the president of the Chinese Chamber of Commerce and other local leaders announced the launch of the "Rose Pak Community Fund", initially with $600,000 in donations, aimed at supporting health care, education, affordable housing and culture.

== See also ==
- History of the Chinese Americans in San Francisco
