= David Chiu (politician) =

American politician (born 1970)

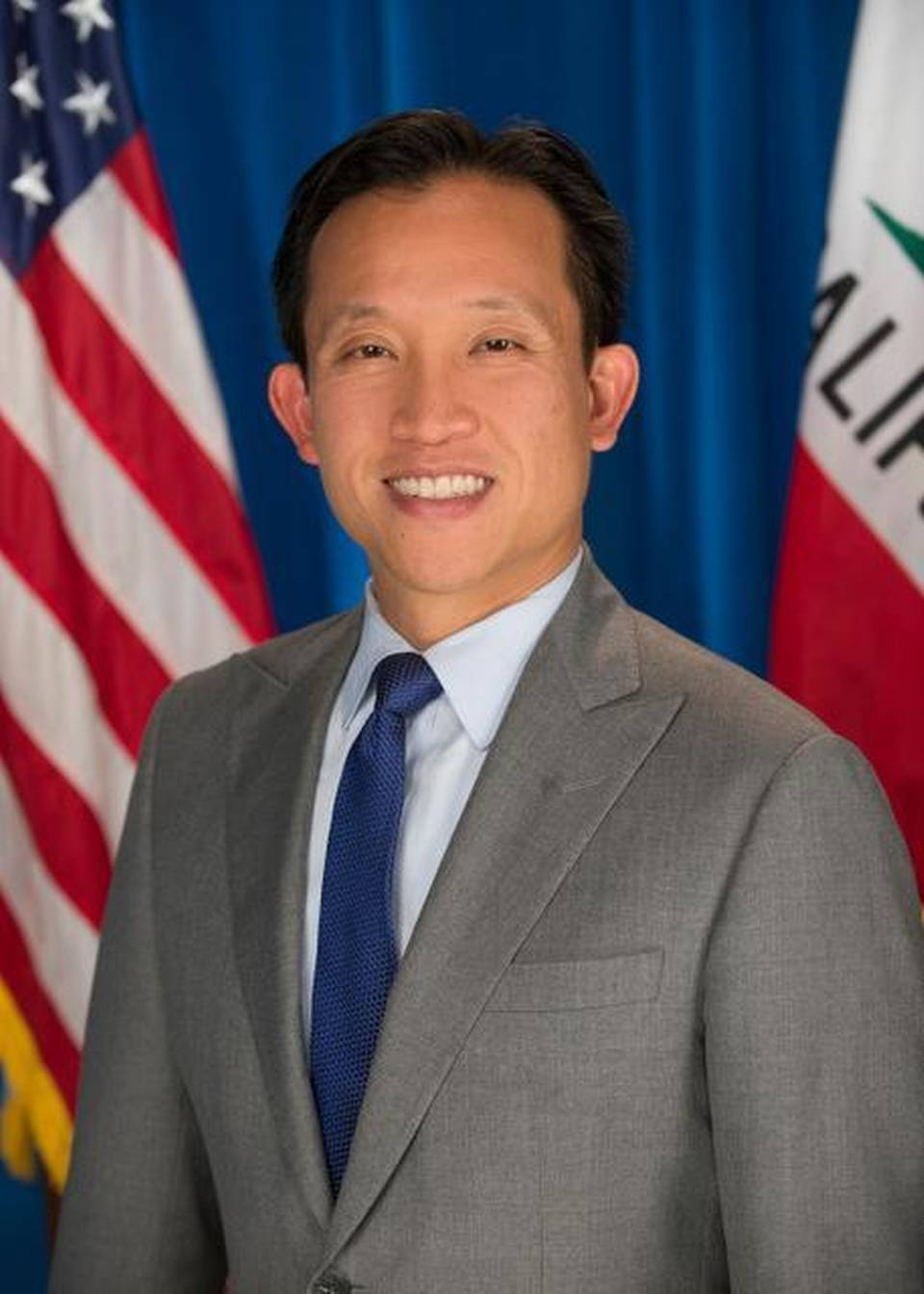
- Official portrait, 2015

City Attorney of San Francisco
- Incumbent
- Assumed office November 1, 2021
- Preceded by: Dennis Herrera

Member of the California State Assembly from the 17th district
- In office December 1, 2014 – October 31, 2021
- Preceded by: Tom Ammiano
- Succeeded by: Matt Haney

President of the San Francisco Board of Supervisors
- In office January 8, 2009 – December 1, 2014
- Preceded by: Aaron Peskin
- Succeeded by: Katy Tang

Member of the San Francisco Board of Supervisors from the 3rd district
- In office January 8, 2009 – December 1, 2014
- Preceded by: Aaron Peskin
- Succeeded by: Julie Christensen

Personal details
- Born: David Sen-Fu Chiu; April 2, 1970 (age 56) Cleveland, Ohio, U.S.
- Party: Democratic
- Spouse: Candace Chen
- Education: Harvard University (BA, MPP, JD)

Chinese name
- Chinese: 邱信福
Transcriptions
Standard Mandarin
- Hanyu Pinyin: Qiū Xìn Fú
Hakka
- Romanization: Chiu Sin Fuk
Yue: Cantonese
- Jyutping: Jau1 Seon3 Fuk1

David Sen-Fu Chiu (Chinese: 邱信福, born April 2, 1970) is an American politician serving since 2021 as City Attorney of San Francisco. Previously, he served in the California State Assembly as a Democrat representing the state's 17th Assembly District, which encompasses the eastern half of San Francisco. Chiu was Chair of the Assembly Housing and Community Development Committee, a position he held from 2016 to 2021, and the former chair of the California Asian & Pacific Islander Legislative Caucus.

Chiu was born to Taiwanese American immigrants and earned three degrees from Harvard University. Prior to his election to the State Assembly, Chiu was the President of the San Francisco Board of Supervisors and Supervisor for District 3, encompassing the northeastern corner of the city, including Chinatown, Nob Hill, North Beach, Union Square, the Financial District, and Fisherman's Wharf. He was the first Asian American to serve as District 3 supervisor, the first Asian American to serve as board president, and the first supervisor elected to three consecutive terms as board president.

On September 29, 2021, San Francisco Mayor London Breed announced that she would appoint David Chiu to serve as the new City Attorney of San Francisco. After he left the Assembly, a special election was held to succeed him, which was won by District 6 supervisor Matt Haney.

== Early life and career ==
The eldest child of Taiwanese American immigrant parents, Chiu was born in Cleveland, Ohio, and grew up in Boston, Massachusetts, where he attended Boston College High School. Chiu graduated from Harvard University, where he received a B.A. in government from Harvard College, a Master of Public Policy (M.P.P.) from the Kennedy School of Government, and a Juris Doctor degree from Harvard Law School.

In the mid-1990s, Chiu served as Democratic Counsel to the U.S. Senate Judiciary Committee's Constitution Subcommittee and aide to Senator Paul Simon to the Senate Budget Committee. After moving to San Francisco in 1996, Chiu worked as a law clerk for Judge James R. Browning of the United States Court of Appeals for the Ninth Circuit, as a criminal prosecutor at the San Francisco District Attorney's Office, and as a civil rights attorney at the Lawyers' Committee for Civil Rights. He later founded Grassroots Enterprise, an online communications technology company, and served as its chief operating officer and general counsel. He also served on the San Francisco Small Business Commission until he was elected supervisor in 2008.

== San Francisco Board of Supervisors ==
=== Elections ===
Chiu first ran for elected office in 2008, when he ran for a seat on the San Francisco Board of Supervisors representing District 3. He was backed by incumbent supervisor Aaron Peskin as well as Kamala Harris, Mark Leno, Leland Yee, and Tom Ammiano.

On his first day in office on January 8, 2009, Chiu was elected to a two-year term as president of the Board of Supervisors. He was reelected board president on January 8, 2011.

Chiu was reelected to his second and final term as supervisor in 2012, winning over 75% of the vote. He was later reelected by his fellow supervisors to serve an unprecedented third term as president of the board on January 8, 2013. In addition to serving on the Board of Supervisors, Chiu also served as a member of the San Francisco Democratic County Central Committee.

=== Housing ===
In 2012, In 2012, Chiu created a program to provide counsel in civil cases, with its first pilot funding legal representation for tenants facing evictions. He also authored legislation to oversee the Affordable Housing Trust Fund, then-Mayor Ed Lee’s plan to invest $1 billion in affordable housing construction and related programs.

In 2013, Chiu authored a law that gave tenants facing Ellis Act evictions priority when applying to affordable housing programs.

In 2014, Chiu authored legislation that fully legalized in-law units in San Francisco, typically garage or basement-level rentals.

=== Environment ===
In 2010, Chiu established the Healthy Nail Salon Recognition Program, designed to phase out toxic chemicals in nail salons.

In 2014, Chiu authored a law that made San Francisco the first major city in the U.S. to ban the sale of single-use plastic water bottles on public property and require the installation of public drinking water taps. In the same year, he authored legislation requiring pharmaceutical companies selling prescription drugs in San Francisco to fully fund and oversee a take-back program for expired drugs and established San Francisco’s “Solar Vision 2020” to expand San Francisco’s GoSolarSF pilot program and advance solar installations and rooftop gardens for new construction.

=== Public engagement ===
In 2012, Chiu launched San Francisco’s first participatory budgeting pilot program, allowing District 3 residents to decide how to allocate a portion of the city’s budget to neighborhood priorities.

In 2013, Chiu authored an Open Data law establishing rules to make the data of all city departments publicly available.

=== Business ===
In 2013, Chiu authored the Family Friendly Workplace Ordinance, which gave workers the right to request flexible working arrangements to assist with caregiving responsibilities. The U.K., Australia, Ireland, Italy and New Zealand have similar laws in place designed to protect workers with families from retaliation and discrimination. The ordinance passed unanimously, making San Francisco the first U.S. city to adopt such a policy.

In 2014, Chiu authored the Predictive Scheduling and Fair Treatment Ordinance, which established fair scheduling practices for part-time workers at chain store retailers.

=== Infrastructure ===
In 2014, Chiu authored San Francisco’s “Dig Once” ordinance, which requires private companies and public agencies digging up city streets to allow the placement of city-owned conduits for fiber-optic cable in order to expand the city’s public fiber network.

=== Immigration ===
In 2010, Chiu authored Proposition D, which would have allowed non-citizen parents to vote in school board elections. The measure failed, but a similar proposition supported by Chiu on the November 2016 ballot later passed with 54% of the vote.

== 2011 mayoral candidacy ==
On January 10, 2011, Chiu served as acting Mayor of San Francisco for a day after Gavin Newsom was sworn in as Lieutenant Governor of California, prior to the selection and swearing-in of Ed Lee by the Board of Supervisors.

On February 28, 2011, Chiu announced his mayoral candidacy at a morning rally at San Francisco City Hall. Over the course of the campaign, Chiu raised over $1.24 million from both private and public sources and spent roughly the same amount.

On Election Day, Chiu placed fourth behind incumbent Ed Lee with 17,921 first-place votes. Despite the fourth-place finish, Chiu, Lee, and third-place candidate Dennis Herrera appeared individually on more ballots overall than John Avalos, who came in second.

== California State Assembly ==
=== Elections ===
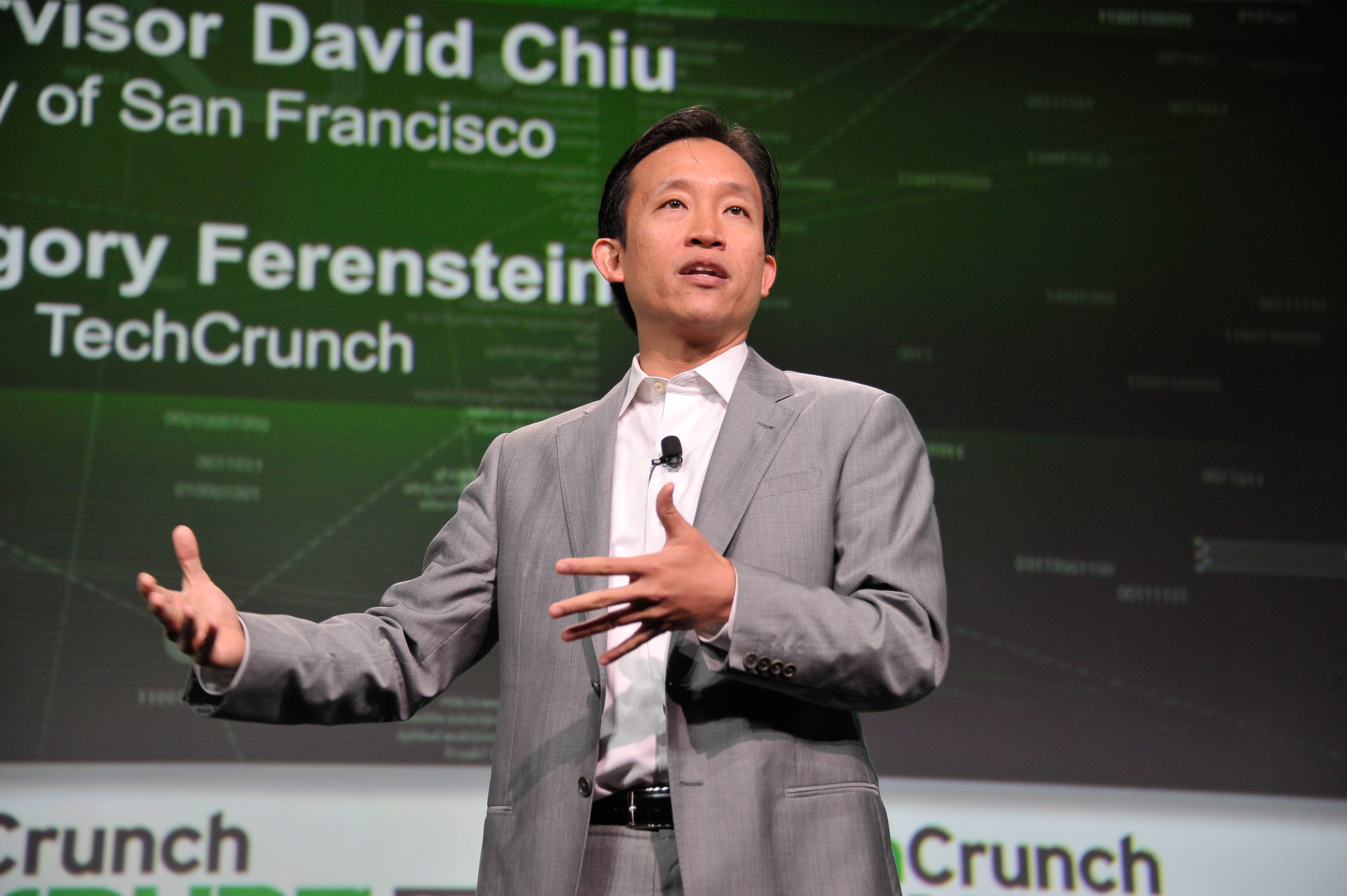
Chiu speaking at TechCrunch in 2013

On September 12, 2013, Chiu announced his candidacy for the California State Assembly to replace termed-out Democrat Tom Ammiano in the 17th district, which encompasses the eastern half of San Francisco. He ran against fellow Democrat and supervisor David Campos, an outspoken progressive. On January 22, 2014, the San Francisco Chronicle column "City Insider" reported that Chiu reported having raised $450,000 for the Assembly race. Polls showed him ahead of Campos.

Chiu beat Campos in the San Francisco primary on Tuesday, June 3, 2014, by approximately five percentage points. Chiu won 48% of the vote, while Campos pulled in 43%, and Republican candidate David Salaverry won 8.5%, meaning the November election would be between Chiu and Campos. On November 4, Chiu defeated Campos with 51.9% of the vote, and Campos conceded on November 6.

In the 2016 California State Assembly election, Chiu defeated Republican challenger Matthew Del Carto 86.3% to 13.7% with 172,153 votes.

In the 2018 California State Assembly election, Chiu defeated Democratic challenger Alejandro Fernandez 75.5% to 24.5% with 140,381 votes.

In the 2020 California State Assembly election, Chiu defeated Libertarian challenger and perennial candidate Starchild 88.9% to 11.1% with 190,731 votes.

=== Tenure ===
David Chiu was appointed by Speaker Toni Atkins to serve as assistant speaker pro tempore in the 2015–16 session. The assistant speaker pro tempore is the third highest ranking position in the state assembly.

=== Housing ===
In 2018, Chiu authored AB 2923, signed into law by Governor Jerry Brown, to facilitate housing production on BART-owned land next to BART stations, with 30% of the housing units required to be affordable.

In 2019, Chiu’s AB 1487 was signed into law to establish the Bay Area Housing Finance Authority (BAHFA), which allows the nine Bay Area counties to work together on affordable housing, including the consideration of regional housing funding measures. That same year, Chiu’s AB 1763 was also signed to allow for larger 100% affordable housing projects through density bonus law.

=== Tenant protections ===
In 2015, Chiu authored bills that allowed domestic violence survivors to terminate a lease early and provided grants for seismic retrofits of buildings with low-income tenants. In 2016, Chiu authored and passed legislation providing protections against tenant blacklisting and prohibiting price-gouging of rental housing during emergencies.

In 2017, he authored and passed the Immigrant Tenant Protection Act, addressing the harassment of immigrant tenants after Donald Trump’s election.

In 2018, Chiu passed his Right to a Safe Home Act to protect crime victims from being evicted for calling emergency assistance, as well as a bill giving tenants more time to dispute evictions.

Chiu successfully authored the Tenant Protection Act of 2019, which prohibited rent-gouging and strengthened just-cause eviction protections. “Governor Newsom hailed AB 1482 as the nation’s strongest statewide protection measure, saying that tenants deserved relief from the state’s soaring housing costs, which have threatened the ability to stay in their homes.”

Chiu authored and passed AB 3088, the COVID-19 Tenant Relief Act of 2020, which prohibited the eviction of tenants facing financial hardship due to the pandemic.

In 2021, Chiu’s AB 832 law extended these eviction protections along with rental assistance funding for struggling tenants and landlords.

=== Homelessness ===
In 2017, Chiu’s AB 74 was signed into law, creating the Housing for a Healthy California Program to provide rental subsidies for chronically homeless individuals with significant health care needs.

In 2018, Chiu’s AB 2162 was signed into law, streamlining the process for the production of supportive housing for chronically homeless individuals.

In 2019, Chiu’s AB 943 was signed into law, allowing community colleges to provide emergency financial aid to students experiencing sudden financial hardships, helping them stay in school and avoid homelessness.

In 2020, Chiu authored AB 2377, signed by Governor Gavin Newsom, to provide local governments the opportunity to prevent the closures of adult residential facilities that house residents with mental illnesses and other serious conditions who would otherwise become homeless.

=== Environment ===
In 2017, Chiu successfully authored two new environmental laws: AB 546 streamlined the permitting process for energy storage, while AB 954 standardized confusing food expiration date labels to reduce food waste.

In 2019, Chiu authored a law allowing people at restaurants or at public events such as concerts and festivals to bring their own reusable containers for food and drinks in order to replace single-use plastics.

In 2021, Chiu authored AB 525 to jumpstart a California offshore wind industry and move the state toward a renewable, clean energy economy; AB 525 passed the Legislature and was signed by Governor Gavin Newsom.

=== Transportation ===
In 2015, Chiu authored two electric transportation laws: AB 1236 streamlined the local permitting process for electric vehicle charging stations, while AB 1096 modernized rules to permit the use of electric bicycles.

=== Consumer protection ===
Chiu’s Public Banking Act of 2019 (AB 857) was signed into law by Governor Newsom, making California the second state in the nation to allow the creation of public banks, as opposed to banks owned by corporate entities. “We finally have the option of reinvesting our public tax dollars in our communities instead of rewarding Wall Street’s bad behavior,” said Chiu after the bill’s passage. In the same year, Chiu’s AB 1340 was signed into law, requiring for-profit colleges to accurately report their graduates’ earnings and debt levels.

=== Immigration ===
In 2017, in the wake of workplace raids by U.S. Immigration and Customs Enforcement after Donald Trump’s election, Chiu authored the Immigrant Worker Protection Act (AB 450), signed into law to provide workplace protections for workers from illegal ICE raids. In the same year, Chiu authored the Immigrant Tenant Protection Act (AB 291), signed into law to safeguard against the unauthorized disclosure of a tenant’s immigration or citizenship status to federal immigration authorities as well as against related landlord harassment or retaliation.

In 2018, Chiu authored the Immigrant Business Inclusion Act (AB 2184), signed into law to allow anyone, regardless of immigration status, to file for a business license.

=== Public safety and criminal justice reform ===
Chiu’s AB 41, signed into law in 2017, required law enforcement agencies to track the handling of rape evidence kits.

A critic of the backlog of untested rape kits, Chiu authored AB 3118, signed into law in 2018 to require the first statewide audit of rape kits untested by California’s law enforcement agencies. In the same year, Chiu’s AB 2138 “fair chance licensing” bill was signed into law, to allow Californians whose record includes an older or less serious arrest or conviction to apply for occupational licenses that could lead to gainful employment.

In 2020, Chiu’s AB 2847 bill was signed into law to modernize California’s “microstamping” law, long challenged by gun manufacturers and the National Rifle Association of America, in order to solve crimes by tracing bullets used in criminal activity.

=== Civil rights ===
In 2015, Chiu and Assemblymember Autumn Burke authored the Reproductive FACT Act, AB 775, which required women’s health clinics to provide accurate information about health options to patients. Co-sponsored by NARAL and then-California Attorney General Kamala Harris, the law was challenged by operators of religious pregnancy centers. While multiple district courts and the Ninth Circuit upheld the law, after Donald Trump’s appointment of Associate Justice Neil Gorsuch, SCOTUS in a 5–4 decision blocked enforcement of the law in National Institute of Family and Life Advocates v. Becerra. In the same year, Chiu authored successful legislation protecting the parental rights of LGBTQ+ couples who rely on assisted reproduction methods.

In 2016, Chiu authored AB 2455, signed into law by Governor Jerry Brown, to register public college students to vote in California as they enroll in classes.

In 2018, Chiu authored AB 2291, signed into law by Governor Jerry Brown, to combat bullying in schools by improving anti-bullying training for teachers.

In 2019, Chiu successfully authored legislation requiring the collection of sexual orientation and gender identity (SOGI) data from state agencies addressing health, human services, education and employment,

In 2020, Chiu along with Assemblymembers Chris Holden and Cristina Garcia (politician) authored AB 979, signed into law by Governor Gavin Newsom, to require diversity on corporate boards. In the same year, Chiu successfully authored a law ensuring that transgender students’ chosen names and identities are accurately reflected on student records,

Chiu was a plaintiff in two successful lawsuits challenging the Trump Administration’s attempts to exclude the counting of immigrants from the 2020 United States Census.

As Chair of the California Asian Pacific Islander Legislative Caucus, Chiu was outspoken against the rise of anti-Asian bigotry during the pandemic and led efforts to pass a historic $156.5M API Equity Budget in the 2021 state budget to combat anti-Asian hate.

== City Attorney of San Francisco ==
Chiu was sworn in as the 15th City Attorney of San Francisco on November 1, 2021, to replace outgoing city attorney Dennis Herrera, who was appointed to the San Francisco Public Utilities Commission after Harlan Kelly resigned due to federal charges. Chiu is the city's first Asian city attorney.
