= Claire Jean Kim =

American political scientist (born 1965)

- Born: July 27, 1965 (age 61)
- Education: Harvard College; Yale University
- Occupation: Political scientist

Claire Jean Kim (born July 27, 1965) is an American political scientist at the University of California, Irvine.

She received her A.B. from Harvard College and an M. Phil and Ph.D. from Yale University. Her research interests are comparative race studies, human-animal studies, race and politics, and social movements.

== Selected publications ==
- Bitter Fruit: The Politics of Black-Korean Conflict in New York City (Yale University Press, 2000)
- Species/Race/Sex (a special issue of American Quarterly, 65, 3, September 2013, co-edited with Carla Freccero)
- Dangerous Crossings: Race, Species and Nature in a Multicultural Age (Cambridge University Press, 2015)
- Asian Americans in an Anti-Black World (Cambridge University Press, 2023)

== Grants and awards ==
- American Political Science Association's Ralph Bunche Award for the Best Book on Ethnic and Cultural Pluralism
- Best Book Award from the American Political Science Association Organized Section on Race, Ethnicity, and Politics
- Grant from the University of California Center for New Racial Studies
- Fellowship at the Institute for Advanced Study in Princeton, New Jersey
- Fellowship at the University of California Humanities Research Institute
