= Aaron Peskin =

American politician (born 1964)

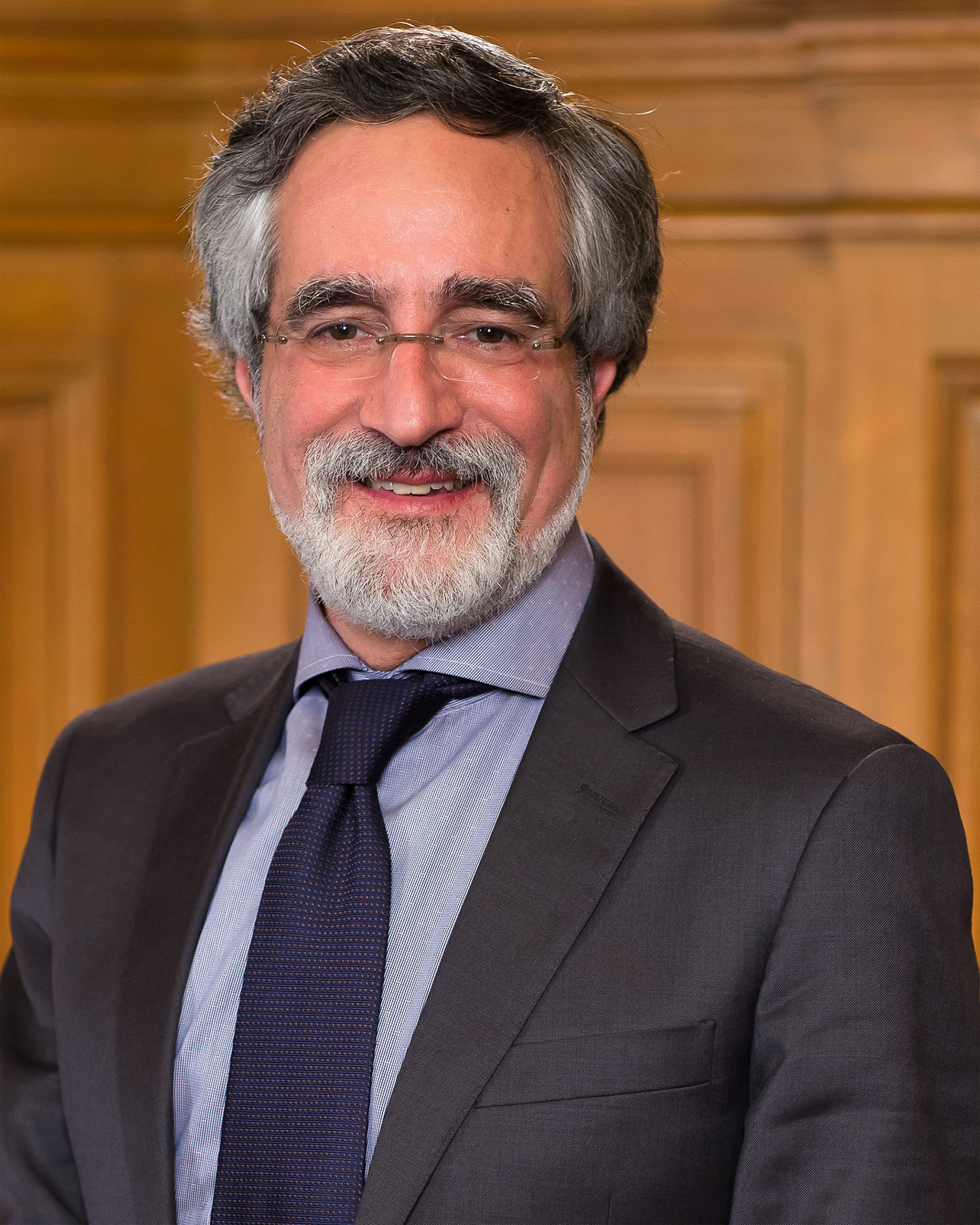
- Official portrait, 2016

President of the San Francisco Board of Supervisors
- In office January 9, 2023 – January 8, 2025
- Preceded by: Shamann Walton
- Succeeded by: Rafael Mandelman
- In office January 8, 2005 – January 8, 2009
- Preceded by: Matt Gonzalez
- Succeeded by: David Chiu

Member of the San Francisco Board of Supervisors from the 3rd district
- In office December 8, 2015 – January 8, 2025
- Preceded by: Julie Christensen
- Succeeded by: Danny Sauter
- In office January 8, 2001 – January 8, 2009
- Preceded by: Constituency established
- Succeeded by: David Chiu

Personal details
- Born: Aaron Dan Peskin; June 17, 1964 (age 62) Berkeley, California, U.S.
- Party: Democratic
- Spouse: Nancy Shanahan
- Education: University of California, Santa Cruz (BA)
- Website: Government website

Aaron Dan Peskin (born June 17, 1964) is an American former elected official in San Francisco, California. He was a member of the San Francisco Board of Supervisors representing District 3 from 2001 to 2009, and again from 2015 to 2025.

District 3 includes the neighborhoods of North Beach, Chinatown, Telegraph Hill, North Waterfront, Financial District, Nob Hill, Union Square, Maiden Lane, Polk Gulch and part of Russian Hill.

At the end of his second set of two terms as Supervisor, Peskin ran as a candidate in the 2024 San Francisco mayoral election, where he placed third behind incumbent mayor London Breed and winner Daniel Lurie.

During his tenure on the Board of Supervisors, Peskin has been known both as a "neighborhood preservationist" by supporters or as a "NIMBY" by critics, as he has regularly sought to block new housing and other developments.

== Early life and education ==
Peskin was born and raised in Berkeley. His mother, Tsipora, is an immigrant from Israel and a therapist. She was faculty at University of California, Berkeley. His father, Harvey, was a therapist and professor of psychology at San Francisco State University. Peskin attended University of California, Santa Cruz, where he earned a bachelor's degree (1987).

As a student at UC Santa Cruz, Peskin was the spokesman for a student group called Campus Association for Responsible Development which sought to limit enrollment growth. Peskin sued the school over a plan to build more student dorms. He was president of the Telegraph Hill Dwellers, where he co-led the effort to stop the Colombo Building from being converted into the Chinatown branch of City College.

== Political career ==
During his first two terms as a supervisor, Peskin mostly sided with a self-described progressive majority on development issues, often being at odds with the policies of mayors Gavin Newsom and Willie Brown. Peskin wrote and won approval for 205 ordinances during his first eight years on the San Francisco Board of Supervisors, making him the most prolific supervisor of his time.

Peskin was first elected in December 2000, along with activists who had gained their first significant political experience on Tom Ammiano's mayoral campaign. Peskin passed legislation in 2003 to establish a 100-foot buffer zone around abortion clinics, requiring protesters to acquire consent before approaching people. Peskin was unanimously elected President of the Board of Supervisors in 2004 and was later re-elected by his colleagues for a second two-year term as president in 2005. He also served as a member of the San Francisco Bay Conservation and Development Commission, an agency responsible for regulating development in, on and immediately surrounding the San Francisco Bay.

When he came to the end of his second term in 2008 he supported David Chiu's successful campaign for the District 3 seat on the Board of Supervisors. San Francisco restricts supervisors to a maximum of two consecutive terms. He was then elected chair of the San Francisco Democratic Party Central Committee (DCCC), the local party's governing board. Peskin held this seat until 2012.

In January 2011, he was a candidate for mayor to fill the unexpired term of Gavin Newsom, who resigned to become Lieutenant Governor of California, but Peskin was not chosen by the Board of Supervisors.

Peskin announced his candidacy for his old District 3 Supervisor's seat, challenging appointed incumbent Julie Christensen, on March 30, 2015. While Peskin had previously served the maximum of two consecutive terms as a supervisor from 2000 to 2008, the city code is silent on non-consecutive terms. When Christensen used the physics concept of a wormhole—a connection between two different space-times—to describe the Stockton Street Tunnel connecting Union Square and Chinatown, Peskin's ally Rose Pak allegedly distorted the word wormhole to imply that Chinatown is a hole of worms, which successfully triggered the anger of some Chinatown residents. That negative press attributed to Pak's comments in Chinatown created an opportunity for Peskin to pick up much-needed votes in the Chinese community when he ran against Christensen. Peskin ultimately defeated Christensen. In 2019, Peskin proposed naming the Chinatown station of the Central Subway the Rose Pak Subway Station against strong opposition from practitioners of the Falun Gong spiritual movement.

Peskin opposed the 2022 recalls of three school board members, and co-sponsored a charter amendment that would have limited the eligibility window for recalls.

Peskin was again termed-out in 2024. He will not be eligible to run again, as San Francisco Voters passed Measure B in June 2026, limiting San Francisco elected officials to a maximum of two terms total (including non-consecutive terms.) 8. On April 4, 2024, he announced his candidacy for mayor in the November 2024 election against incumbent London Breed; Daniel Lurie won the race.

=== Housing and development ===
Since his first days in office, Peskin has been known as a "neighborhood preservationist" (SF Weekly), opposing and preventing many development projects in San Francisco, often citing their low affordable housing quotas and negative impact on locals. He has been described as aligned with "the housing policies of San Francisco's progressive Democrats, who prioritize existing tenants and neighborhood character when deciding where to build" (KQED), but "earn[ed] a reputation as the city's preeminent NIMBY among housing activists" (SF Standard).

Peskin has defended the California Environmental Quality Act against widespread criticism that it had (as summarized by the San Francisco Chronicle) "become a cudgel used by NIMBYs to block any project they don't like", with San Francisco's CEQA appeals process being especially onerous. Peskin described it as a "remarkably helpful law" that had protected the city from several bad projects, while acknowledging that the process was "messy and time-consuming." Peskin blocked discussion of a 2021 proposal that would have required 50 signatures to invoke the California Environmental Quality Act to block projects, rather than just one person.

In 2023, Peskin authored legislation with Mayor Breed which aimed to redevelop underutilized space downtown. The law promoted mixed-use zoning, housing development, and the conversion of commercial spaces to residential spaces. Later, in 2024, Peskin spearheaded an effort to designate the Northern Waterfront and Jackson Square as historic districts and thus restoring the pre-2023 neighborhood height limit laws and preventing development of dense, large housing in the area. Peskin's legislation ultimately passed despite being vetoed by mayor London Breed who said Peskin's bill "passes off anti-housing policy under the guise of historic protection."

Peskin instigated the eminent domain seizure of a triangular plot of private property at 701 Lombard Street in 2003. He acted with Telegraph Hill Dwellers, a neighborhood association, when it became clear that the lot could be used for open space and turned into a park. The parties attempting to commercially develop the lot called this an abuse of government power. The lot was approved as the new site for the North Beach branch of the San Francisco Public Library in 2011. The library was completed in 2014.

Peskin prevented the conversion of hotel rooms by several San Francisco hotels into condominiums in 2005. He said that "turning 226 hotel rooms into 60 luxury, multimillion-dollar condominium units isn't addressing the housing needs of San Francisco". The legislation was ultimately passed with support from housing advocates and hotel workers.

Peskin sponsored 2006 legislation to curb the Ellis Act, a state law that allows property owners to evict tenants by quitting the rental business, by prohibiting landlords who instigate an Ellis Act eviction from participating in the city's condominium conversion lottery. The Ellis Act has led to many tenancy-in-common conversions of apartment buildings in San Francisco by tenants who desire to own property, and real estate promoters seeking to make ownership opportunities available (and thereby earning fees and profits).

Peskin has been endorsed by the San Francisco Tenants Union, the Affordable Housing Alliance and the Community Tenants Association. In his 2015 reelection campaign, he advocated extending San Francisco's rent control to buildings constructed after 1979 (which would necessitate changes in state law). He has also been endorsed by the San Francisco Apartment Association, an advocacy group for rental building owners and property managers, of which he is a member as a landlord himself.

Peskin opposes the Treasure Island Development project, which over two decades is planned to create 7,000 to 8,000 housing units, 25 percent of which are affordable, alongside commercial, retail, office and public spaces. He led a group called Citizens for a Sustainable Treasure Island in lawsuits against the city of San Francisco and a developer, arguing that its impact on environment and traffic had not been properly reviewed. The courts rejected the complaint by Peskin and his group, with the California Supreme Court declining an appeal in October 2014.

In October 2021, Peskin voted to block construction of a 495-unit apartment building with 25% affordable housing on the site of a Nordstroms valet parking lot. That same month, Peskin voted against the construction of 316 micro-homes in Tenderloin, 13.5% of which would have been designated as affordable housing. Peskin said there was "a glut of group housing in the Tenderloin and Mid-Market areas."

In January 2022, Peskin defended the delay in approval for a $18.7 million grant to repurpose a hotel in his district into a homeless shelter for upwards of 250 people. Peskin said that the project needed "meaningful and real involvement with the community."

In 2023, Peskin voted to halt the conversion of a single-family home in Nob Hill into ten townhomes. He said that the new housing might adversely affect a nearby recreation center.

In 2024, Peskin opposed SB951, a bill that would remove the ability of the California Coastal Commission to delay and reject housing developments in areas of San Francisco's coast that are already urbanized. He also voted to block the construction of 24 housing units on the lot of a former medical library.

Peskin has criticized the historical redevelopment of neighborhoods like the Fillmore and Japantown which has displaced Black residents.

=== Environment and landmarks ===
Peskin spearheaded a 2001 plan to prevent the San Francisco Airport from filling in a 200-square-meter (2,200 sq ft) section of the San Francisco Bay to build more runways. His proposed cuts to the airport project were passed unanimously by the Board of Supervisors, which cut funding of field studies for environmental impacts of proposed runways nearly in half, from $11.2 million to $6.2 million.

Peskin created the Landmarks Preservation Board, a commission to oversee the protection and preservation of historic sites in San Francisco, in 2008.

While not in office, Peskin partnered with the Sierra Club and the Audubon Society to file the Waterfront Watch Suit, which called for a process for review of Pier 29 rehabilitation work, a reduction of air emissions at Pier 27, and an agreement not to place a jumbotron on the water in Aquatic Park Lagoon.

=== Transportation ===
Peskin authored a 2007 charter amendment to increase San Francisco Municipal Railway (Muni) funding and implement agency reforms.

During his time as Supervisor of District 3 (2001–2009), Peskin supported the New Jefferson Street Project. The project was a plan to create the first pedestrian priority street to accommodate the high volume of tourist traffic into Fisherman's Wharf.

Peskin and supervisor Shamann Walton opted to not introduce a $108 million sales tax measure onto the November 2020 ballot to finance Caltrain, which had seen a 95% reduction in ridership due to the COVID-19 pandemic in California. Ride fares account for 70% of the service's operating budget. The supervisors cited the lack of shared authority on the Joint Powers Board over the train line's management, which is currently operated by SamTrans, and the regressive nature of the sales tax to fund operations for a service whose customer base has a mean income of $120,000. Peskin noted that the measure could still be introduced by the mayor or other supervisors if they choose. The supervisors later changed their minds when Caltrain pledged to make changes to its structure, making it more independent from SamTrans.

== Public image ==
Peskin has been involved with contentious decisions which weighed public landmarks and events against the desires of his constituents, including the disagreement surrounding alcohol permits at the North Beach Jazz Festival, the temporary shutdown of the Savoy Tivoli, and cancelling the San Francisco Grand Prix because the bike race's backers owed the city money.

In 2007, San Francisco Chronicle reporters Matier and Ross described Peskin as having a reputation as the "Napoleon of North Beach." During Peskin's time as an influential neighborhood activist, he was known as "The Ayatollah of North Beach".

=== Phone calls ===
Peskin has been known to make late night phone calls to public officials and private citizens. For example, he called the Port of San Francisco director Monique Moyer several times about cutting their funding over disagreements concerning waterfront building height limits. Mayor Newsom told the San Francisco Chronicle that people around city hall had been complaining about Peskin's behavior for years. However, former San Francisco Mayor Art Agnos has said Peskin's alleged behavior falls "well within the boundaries of the system" and that it's "not unusual in politics at any level of government."

In 2018, at the scene of the St. Patrick's Day fire in North Beach, Peskin was reportedly intoxicated while he verbally berated then-Deputy Fire Chief of Operations Mark Gonzalez. Peskin has denied being intoxicated at the time but has apologized for his behavior.

In June 2021, Peskin announced in a statement that he would be entering into alcohol treatment. Peskin apologized for behavior that he attributed to his alcohol problem, but also announced that he planned to remain in office while in treatment.

== Personal life ==
He married in 1996 to land-use attorney Nancy Shanahan. As of 2024 (and since at least 2007, when it was headquartered in North Beach), Peskin and his wife run the non-profit Great Basin Land and Water, which is concerned with water rights and land transactions in the states of California, Nevada and Utah.

He is a member of the South End Rowing Club and an avid outdoorsman, having hiked the John Muir Trail in 2006 and 2007.

=== Real estate portfolio ===
Peskin owns a 1,495-square-foot (138.9 m^{2}) duplex in Telegraph Hill that he purchased for $800,000 in 2002 and had a market value of $1,750,000 in 2022. He and his wife own three additional houses in Telegraph Hill, which they rent out. The combined market value of his real estate properties was nearly $7,000,000 in 2022. According to Peskin's Statement of Economic Interests, these properties and his personal investments make him the wealthiest supervisor in San Francisco.
