= 2022 California's 17th State Assembly district special election =

- April 19, 2022

California's 17th State Assembly district
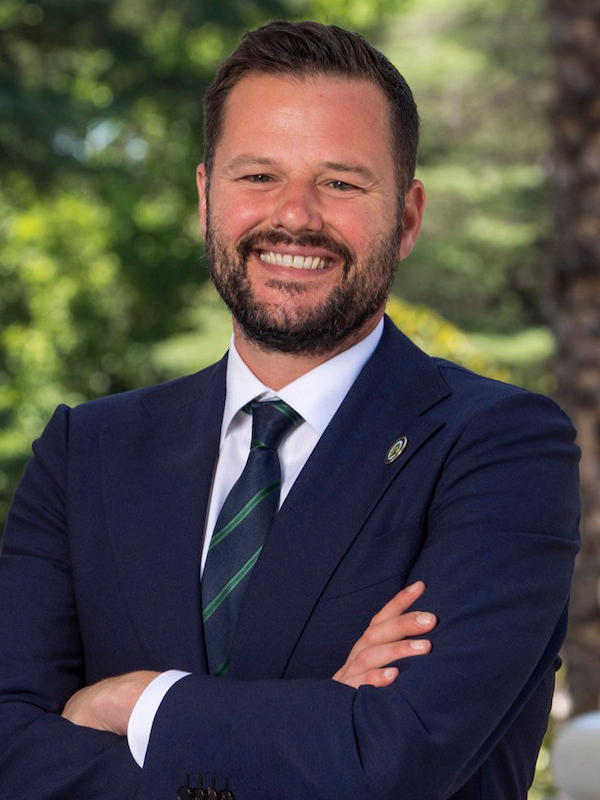

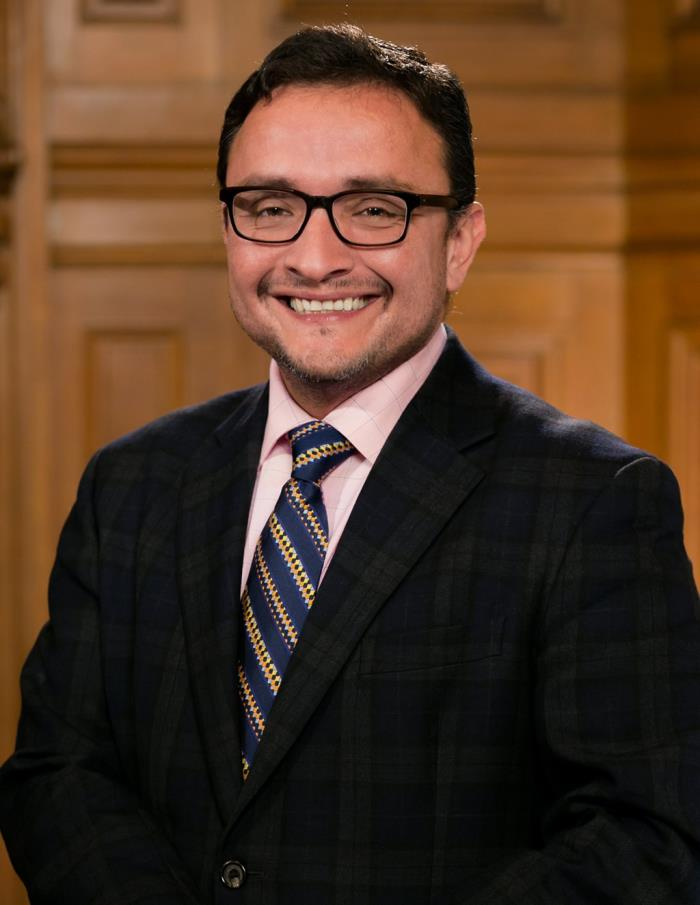
Candidate	Matt Haney	David Campos
Party	Democratic	Democratic
Popular vote	48,762	29,422
Percentage	62.4%	37.6%
Assemblymember before election
David Chiu
Democratic
Elected Assemblymember
Matt Haney
Democratic

The 2022 California 17th State Assembly district special election was a special election to fill the vacant 17th Assembly District. The special election was called after incumbent Assemblymember David Chiu resigned the seat to become City Attorney of San Francisco. Matt Haney, a member of the San Francisco Board of Supervisors, won the election.

The blanket primary election was held on February 15, coinciding with the local special election on the same date. The general election was held on April 19, 2022. According to the Wall Street Journal, the election centered on the issue of "Which candidate wants to build more housing."

== Background ==
On November 1, 2021, then-Assemblymember David Chiu resigned his Assemblymember position and was sworn in as San Francisco City Attorney. On November 15, Governor Gavin Newsom declared that the primary election would occur on February 15, 2022, and the general election would occur on April 19, 2022. The election was a two-round system. If no candidate won a simple majority of votes in the primary election, the top two vote-getters would face off in the general election.

Voter turnout for special elections is often lower than that of regular elections. However, after new vote by mail laws passed in California due to the COVID-19 pandemic, the most recent off-cycle election included unusually high turnout primarily via the vote by mail option. Turnout for the 2021 California gubernatorial recall election was 58%, twice as high as expected in a normal special election. If this trend holds, the California 17th assembly district special election could have similarly high turnout.

== Candidates ==
Four candidates (all registered Democrats) were certified to run in the special election.

- Bilal Mahmood, behavioral economics researcher, predictive analytics entrepreneur and policy analyst in the Obama administration
- David Campos, Chief of Staff for the San Francisco District Attorney, and former member of the San Francisco Board of Supervisors
- Matt Haney, a member of the San Francisco Board of Supervisors
- Thea Selby, a City College of San Francisco trustee

Following the primary election, David Campos and Matt Haney advanced to the general run-off election.

== Issues ==
=== Housing ===
==== 469 Stevenson Street ====
In October 2021, San Francisco Board of Supervisors voted 8–3 against a housing development at 469 Stevenson Street in San Francisco. Supervisor Matt Haney, whose district the project was in, was among the three who voted in favor of the project. The proposed housing site, which is located in Haney's district and currently serves as a valet parking lot for Nordstrom, would have provided 73 affordable housing units on-site and 45 off-site, as well as created 1,000 union jobs. Haney argued in support of the project, citing “a homelessness crisis, a housing affordability crisis and a climate crisis" that necessitated more housing at all levels, including affordable housing. Bilal Mahmood and Thea Selby also supported the project.

David Campos opposed the project, arguing that the project would cause gentrification and displacement of low-income residents from the neighborhood. Haney countered: “I don’t think it prevents gentrification to keep a Nordstrom’s valet parking lot,” and noted that most low-income people living in the neighborhood have strong protections against displacement.

Pundits argued that it was unusual for the board to overrule the district supervisor on a land use rule. Because six of the supervisors had endorsed David Campos, they claimed the vote was about "punishing Matt Haney for running against David Campos."

In March 2022, the Haney campaign sent a print mail advertisement to voters about the Stevenson Street project. The mailer stated: “Matt Haney voted to build 495 units of housing for working families here – his opponent, David Campos, wants to keep it a valet parking lot." The Campos campaign accused Haney of flip-flopping on housing policy and disputed the number of homes that would be reserved and priced affordably for low-income households.

==== Policy positions ====
Matt Haney advocated more housing construction, citing housing affordability, climate change, and homelessness as problems that could be addressed with more housing. He supported stronger state action through legislation and executive action to encourage and compel cities to build more housing. The Wall Street Journal wrote, "In a city where loud voices like to kill new housing, Haney forged a reputation as someone willing to buck the anti-housing superstition and find workable compromises to a pressing issue." Haney also cited the need for a regional approach to ensure all cities and neighborhoods build more housing. He proposed in the state assembly to reform zoning and allow for more housing; build more homes, including social housing, in San Francisco; strengthening tenant protections; and holding localities accountable for their share of new housing.

David Campos opposed market-rate development, saying "I don't believe...we should give a blank check to developers that simply lets them build whatever they want without any say from residents in these neighborhoods." Campos emphasized government investment in income-restricted affordable housing and tenant protections.

Haney previously held many housing stances that he criticized Campos for, including a moratorium on new market-rate housing in the Mission District and opposing state laws that speed up housing development. But early in the election season, Haney declared his support for more state control over local housing authority.

=== "Tenderloin Supervisor Matt Haney" ===
David Campos regularly referred to Matt Haney as "the Tenderloin supervisor" and placed an online video ad that blamed Haney for serious levels of crime, drug use and homelessness in the neighborhood. Campos said that under Haney's tenure, the situation was so bad that the Mayor declared a state of emergency. Haney responded that the epithet was a "cynical" ploy to "fear and prejudice", tying Haney to one out of many neighborhoods in his district. Haney stated that he had brought more resources to the Tenderloin. Haney's campaign shared a letter by Tenderloin merchants and residents calling on Campos to take down his negative advertising, saying "you are ostracizing and degrading an entire community for your own political gain.” Campos responded, “I think that what’s happening to this community is a travesty. And saying that it is a travesty is not an attack on that community.”

A political science scholar suggested “negative campaign ads tend to work in national and state level politics, but at the level of neighborhoods, in a city where neighborhoods matter, an ad blaming a single politician for its condition might backfire and alienate voters throughout the city.”

=== Campos Ballot Designation ===
In December 2021, lawyers representing Matt Haney wrote to the California Secretary of State to challenge David Campos's ballot designation as "civil rights attorney". The lawyers argued that there was no record that Campos had acted as a civil rights attorney in his recent jobs as a government administrator or as Chief of Staff to District Attorney Chesa Boudin. A Haney campaign spokesperson said it was "confusing and misleading" for Campos to omit his occupation from voters. The Campos campaign responded, "David [Campos] was hired by the district attorney's office to be a civil rights attorney," and called the challenge "cynical". The Secretary of State's office approved the ballot designation.

In February 2022, Haney's campaign filed a lawsuit against California Secretary of State Shirley Weber seeking a court order to strike the ballot designation. Campos and Boudin submitted declarations in support of "civil rights attorney" as a ballot designation, arguing that civil rights work was a core part of Campos's occupation with the District Attorney's office. The judge in the case disagreed, saying “The court finds that it is highly unlikely that the tasks that Mr. Campos and Mr. Boudin have outlined in their declarations is their principal occupation, versus overseeing the prosecution and making policy decisions involving those accused of a crime or enforcing the criminal laws.” The judge rejected "civil rights attorney" and "criminal justice attorney" as ballot designations, ultimately approving "criminal justice administrator" as Campos's ballot designation. After the ruling, Haney expressed vindication that Campos's original designation was misleading. Campos maintained that his work with the District Attorney's office protected civil rights, "including the right to be safe" and "working to free the wrongfully convicted".

Professor James Taylor of University of San Francisco called the ruling a win for the Haney campaign, saying that it paints Campos' campaign as "misleading" and tying Campos to Chesa Boudin, who faces a recall election in June. Professor David McCuan of Sonoma State University said the difference between the old and new ballot designations was marginal, but it could sway more voters towards Haney over Campos.

== Endorsements ==
David Campos

Individuals

- Supervisor Connie Chan
- Supervisor Rafael Mandelman
- Supervisor Aaron Peskin
- Supervisor Gordon Mar
- Supervisor Dean Preston
- Supervisor Hillary Ronen
- Former Supervisor Bevan Dufty
- Former Supervisor Jeff Sheehy
- Former Supervisor Norman Yee
- Former Supervisor Sandra Lee Fewer
- Former Supervisor Eric Mar
- Former Supervisor Jake McGoldrick
- Former Supervisor Matt Gonzalez
- Former Supervisor Christina Olague
- Former Supervisor Sophie Maxwell
- Former Assemblyman Tom Ammiano
- Former State Senator Mark Leno
- City College of San Francisco Trustee Thea Selby (after being eliminated in the primary)

Newspapers

- Bay Area Reporter
- San Francisco Bay Guardian

Organizations

- Harvey Milk LGBTQ Democratic Club
Matt Haney

Elected Officials

- Mayor London Breed
- Supervisor Shamann Walton
- Supervisor Ahsha Safaí
- BART Board member Lateefah Simon
- Attorney General of California Rob Bonta
- California State Superintendent of Public Instruction Tony Thurmond

Other Individuals

- Bilal Mahmood (after being eliminated)
- San Francisco Democratic Party Chair Honey Mahogany

Newspaper(s)

- San Francisco Examiner
- San Francisco Chronicle (in general run-off election)

Organizations

- Alice B. Toklas LGBT Democratic Club
- Service Employees International Union California
Bilal Mahmood

Newspaper(s)

- San Francisco Chronicle (in primary election)

== Polling ==
=== Primary election ===
Poll source	Date(s) administered	Sample size (Note: Key: A – all adults RV – registered voters LV – likely voters V – unclear)	Margin of error	David Campos (D)	Matt Haney (D)	Bilal Mahmood (D)	Thea Selby (D)	Undecided
Tulchin Research (D) (Note: Poll sponsored by Campos's campaign)	December 2021	400 (LV)	± 4.9%	29%	26%	13%	4%	28%

=== Runoff ===
Poll source	Date(s) administered	Sample size	Margin of error	David Campos (D)	Matt Haney (D)	Undecided
Tulchin Research (D)	Mid-March 2021	– (LV)	–	43%	37%	20%
David Binder Research (D) (Note: Poll sponsored by Haney's campaign)	February 21–27, 2021	500 (LV)	± 4.9%	35%	52%	13%

== Results ==
2022 California's 17th State Assembly district special election
Primary election
Party	Candidate	Votes	%
Democratic	Matt Haney	34,174	36.4
Democratic	David Campos	33,448	35.7
Democratic	Bilal Mahmood	20,895	22.3
Democratic	Thea Selby	5,261	5.6
Total votes		93,778	100.0
General election
Democratic	Matt Haney	48,762	62.4
Democratic	David Campos	29,422	37.6
Total votes		78,184	100.0
Democratic hold			

== Aftermath ==
=== Analysis ===
==== Housing ====
Housing became a key policy differentiator between the campaigns and was frequently discussed by reporters and analysts. Haney and Campos held very similar policy views and "there was barely any daylight between the ideological positions of the two candidates". Although Haney and Campos once held similar housing views, Matt Haney shifted his position on housing, and earned support from pro-housing YIMBY groups. The San Francisco Chronicle wrote that Haney's campaign was "one of the most housing-focused campaigns the city has seen in recent history". Haney's evolution on housing from past positions secured the support of pro-housing YIMBY groups. In contrast, David Campos's framing of housing as a stark choice between affordable homes against luxury condos was not an effective message. Joe Eskenazi for Mission Local wrote that Campos and the city's progressive wing must provide better solutions for housing affordability.

Benjamin Schneider at the Examiner speculated that San Francisco progressives would take more pro-housing positions in the future, noting that progressives Alex Lee, Alexandria Ocasio-Cortez, and Elizabeth Warren have embraced YIMBY policies. Dustin Gardiner for the San Francisco Chronicle wrote that the blowout victory was a decisive win for the YIMBY movement, boosting their ability to attract progressive candidates in California to their banner. Paul Krugman for The New York Times wrote that the election was fought largely over housing policy, and more YIMBY electoral victories could foreshadow positive benefits for the national economy and environment.

==== Fundraising ====
Matt Haney raised more money than David Campos, and in addition, Matt Haney benefited from $1.7 million in independent expenditure money from labor unions and the California Association of Realtors. The independent expenditure committees inundated David Campos with negative ads around his housing policy and his close ties to District Attorney Chesa Boudin, who faces a recall election in June. Campos lamented that "Big money has figured out how to win elections." However, Joe Eskenazi noted that while a large money advantage could shift an election by 6 points, money alone was insufficient to explain a 25-point lead.

==== Coalition ====
People described Matt Haney as friendly and positive, but also a political opportunist. Matt Haney was able to create a larger political coalition by courting moderates and housing advocates. In contrast, David Campos had antagonized and alienated allies during his political career. As a result, Campos had less support from would-be supporters such as LGBTQ advocacy group Equality California, and lacked key labor endorsements. Matt Haney credited his success most to labor union support from AFSCME and SEIU local affiliates.

==== Summary ====
In summary, observers concluded that Matt Haney ran a better campaign. Haney raised more money, had a bigger coalition, and chose a strong contrast message on housing that resonated with voters. In contrast, David Campos ran an "anachronistic" campaign that did not expand his voter base, using ineffective messaging around corporate financing. Campos's attempts to link Haney to crime and poverty in the Tenderloin neighborhood and to corporations did not stick.

=== Supervisor Vacancy Appointment ===
Matt Haney's election to the Assembly left an impending vacancy on the San Francisco Board of Supervisors beginning May 3. Mayor London Breed appointed Matt Dorsey to be District 6 Supervisor until the end of the term. The next scheduled election for this seat is November 2022. Matt Haney has announced support for his chief of staff, Honey Mahogany to become Supervisor.

== Notes ==
Partisan clients
