= 2008 San Francisco Board of Supervisors election =

- November 4, 2008

The 2008 San Francisco Board of Supervisors elections occurred on November 4, 2008. Seven of the eleven seats of the San Francisco Board of Supervisors were contested in this election. Four incumbents were termed out of office, while three ran for reelection.

Municipal elections in California are officially non-partisan, though most candidates in San Francisco do receive funding and support from various political parties. The election was held using ranked-choice voting.

== Results ==
=== District 1 ===

This district consists of the Richmond District. Incumbent supervisor Jake McGoldrick was termed out of office.

District 1 supervisorial election, 2008
Candidate	Votes	%
Eric Mar	11,625	40.52
Sue Lee	9,733	33.93
Alicia Wang	4,206	14.66
Brian Larkin	995	3.47
Jason Jungreis	610	2.13
Nicholas Belloni	536	1.87
Fidel Gakuba	361	1.26
George Flamik	324	1.13
Sherman D'Silva	254	0.89
Write-in	42	0.15
Valid votes	29,643	90.79%
Invalid or blank votes	3,008	9.21
Total votes	32,651	100.00
Turnout	{{{votes}}}	80.76%
Ranked choice voting — Pass 1
Eric Mar	11,649	40.51
Sue Lee	9,753	33.92
Alicia Wang (eliminated)	4,218	14.67
Brian Larkin (eliminated)	998	3.47
Jason Jungreis (eliminated)	614	2.14
Nicholas Belloni (eliminated)	537	1.87
Fidel Gakuba (eliminated)	363	1.26
George Flamik (eliminated)	325	1.13
Sherman D'Silva (eliminated)	257	0.89
Write-in (eliminated)	42	0.15
Eligible votes	28,756	90.73%
Exhausted votes	2,938	9.27%
Total votes	31,694	100.00
Ranked choice voting — Pass 2
Eric Mar	13,152	50.67
Sue Lee	12,805	49.33
Eligible votes	25,957	81,90%
Exhausted votes	5,737	18.10%
Total votes	31,694	100.00

=== District 3 ===

District 3 consists of the northeastern corner of San Francisco, including Chinatown, the Financial District, Fisherman's Wharf, Nob Hill, North Beach, and Telegraph Hill. Incumbent supervisor Aaron Peskin was termed out of office.

District 3 supervisorial election, 2008
Candidate	Votes	%
David Chiu	10,209	37.72
Joseph Alioto, Jr.	6,268	23.16
Denise McCarthy	3,165	11.69
Claudine Cheng	2,492	9.21
Mike DeNunzio	1,330	4.91
Lynn Jefferson	1,234	4.56
Tony Gantner	1,191	4.40
Wilma Pang	939	3.47
Mark Quessey	204	0.75
Write-in	35	0.13
Valid votes	28,276	90.33%
Invalid or blank votes	3,028	9.67
Total votes	31,304	100.00
Turnout	{{{votes}}}	80.44%
Ranked choice voting — Pass 7
David Chiu	13,582	59.37
Joseph Alioto, Jr.	9,293	40.63
Eligible votes	22,875	76.03%
Exhausted votes	7,211	23.97%
Total votes	30,086	100.00

==== Ranked-choice vote distribution ====
Candidate	Pass 1	Pass 2	Pass 3	Pass 4	Pass 5	Pass 6	Pass 7
David Chiu	10,270	10,512	10,800	10,919	11,146	12,348	13,582
Joseph Alioto, Jr.	6,285	6,400	6,655	7,113	7,423	8,175	9,293
Denise McCarthy	3,172	3,341	3,572	3,715	4,227	4,633	
Claudine Cheng	2,515	2,779	2,886	3,027	3,223		
Lynn Jefferson	1,235	1,365	1,471	1,650			
Mike DeNunzio	1,335	1,386	1,466				
Tony Gantner	1,195	1,235					
Wilma Pang	952						
Mark Quessey	204						
Write-in	35						
Eligible ballots	27,198	27,018	26,850	26,424	26,019	25,156	22,875
Exhausted ballots	2,888	3,068	3,236	3,662	4,067	4,930	7,211
Total	30,086	30,086	30,086	30,086	30,086	30,086	30,086

=== District 4 ===

District 4 consists primarily of the Sunset district. Incumbent supervisor Carmen Chu was seeking her first election after being appointed by Mayor Gavin Newsom in the wake of Ed Jew's suspension and resignation.

District 4 supervisorial special election, 2008
Candidate	Votes	%
Carmen Chu (incumbent)	15,353	52.37
Ron Dudum	10,304	35.15
David Ferguson	3,606	12.30
Write-in	53	0.18
Valid votes	30,060	92.86%
Invalid or blank votes	2,312	7.14
Total votes	32,372	100.00
Turnout	{{{votes}}}	79.14%
Ranked choice voting — Pass 1
Carmen Chu (incumbent)	15,405	52.33
Ron Dudum	10,346	35.14
David Ferguson	3,635	12.35
Write-in	53	0.18
Eligible votes	29,439	93.08%
Exhausted votes	2,189	6.92%
Total votes	31,628	100.00

=== District 5 ===

District 5 consists of the Fillmore, Haight-Ashbury, Hayes Valley, Japantown, UCSF, and the Western Addition. Incumbent supervisor Ross Mirkarimi was seeking reelection.

District 5 supervisorial election, 2008
Candidate	Votes	%
Ross Mirkarimi (incumbent)	27,482	77.39
Owen P. O'Connell	5,962	16.79
Rob Anderson	1,982	5.58
Write-in	87	0.24
Valid votes	37,408	86.85%
Invalid or blank votes	5,662	13.15
Total votes	43,070	100.00
Turnout	{{{votes}}}	83.33%

=== District 7 ===

District 7 consists of City College, Forest Hill, Lake Merced, Mount Davidson, Parkmerced, San Francisco State University, St. Francis Wood, and Twin Peaks. Incumbent supervisor Sean Elsbernd was seeking reelection.

District 7 supervisorial election, 2008
Candidate	Votes	%
Sean Elsbernd (incumbent)	22,019	71.06
Julian Lagos	5,792	18.69
Billy Bob Whitmer	2,964	9.57
Write-in	211	0.68
Valid votes	32,420	85.09%
Invalid or blank votes	5,683	14.91
Total votes	38,103	100.00
Turnout	{{{votes}}}	84.04%

=== District 9 ===

District 9 consists of Bernal Heights, the Inner Mission, and part of the Portola. Incumbent supervisor Tom Ammiano was termed out of office.

District 9 supervisorial election, 2008
Candidate	Votes	%
David Campos	9,440	35.78
Mark Sanchez	7,616	28.86
Eric Quezada	5,337	20.23
Eva Royale	1,830	6.94
Thomas Valtin	857	3.25
Eric Storey	802	3.04
Vern Mathews	466	1.77
Write-in	39	0.15
Valid votes	27,183	91.59%
Invalid or blank votes	2,497	8.41
Total votes	29,680	100.00
Turnout	{{{votes}}}	81.46%
Ranked choice voting — Pass 3
David Campos	12,637	53.83
Mark Sanchez	10,837	46.17
Eligible votes	23,474	81.27%
Exhausted votes	5,410	18.73%
Total votes	28,884	100.00

==== Ranked-choice vote distribution ====
Candidate	Pass 1	Pass 2	Pass 3
David Campos	9,468	10,387	12,637
Mark Sanchez	7,648	8,623	10,837
Eric Quezada	5,352	5,964	
Eva Royale	1,842		
Thomas Valtin	862		
Eric Storey	806		
Vern Mathews	469		
Write-in	39		
Eligible ballots	26,486	24,974	23,474
Exhausted ballots	2,398	3,910	5,410
Total	28,884	28,884	28,884

=== District 11 ===

District 11 consists of the Excelsior, Ingleside, Oceanview, and the Outer Mission. Incumbent supervisor Gerardo Sandoval was termed out of office.

District 11 supervisorial election, 2008
Candidate	Votes	%
John Avalos	6,918	28.19
Ahsha Safaí	5,941	24.21
Myrna Lim	4,442	18.10
Julio Ramos	3,626	14.78
Randall Knox	2,324	9.47
Mary Goodnature	455	1.85
Adrian Bermudez	410	1.67
Eli Horn	391	1.59
Write-in	24	0.10
A. Jackson Matteson	6	0.02
Valid votes	25,126	91.37%
Invalid or blank votes	2,372	8.63
Total votes	27,498	100.00
Turnout	{{{votes}}}	76.21%
Ranked choice voting — Pass 4
John Avalos	10,225	52.93
Ahsha Safaí	9,092	47.07
Eligible votes	19,317	71.79%
Exhausted votes	7,592	28.21%
Total votes	26,909	100.00

==== Ranked-choice vote distribution ====
Candidate	Pass 1	Pass 2	Pass 3	Pass 4
John Avalos	6,964	7,625	8,887	10,225
Ahsha Safaí	5,941	5,965	6,727	7,611
Myrna Lim	4,462	5,053	5,929	
Julio Ramos	3,646	4,321		
Randall Knox	2,337			
Mary Goodnature	459			
Adrian Bermudez	415			
Eli Horn	394			
Write-in	30			
A. Jackson Matteson	1			
Eligible ballots	24,673	23,726	22,427	19,317
Exhausted ballots	2,236	3,183	4,482	7,592
Total	26,909	26,909	26,909	26,909
