= Eddy Zheng =

Chinese American youth counselor

Xiaofei "Eddy" Zheng
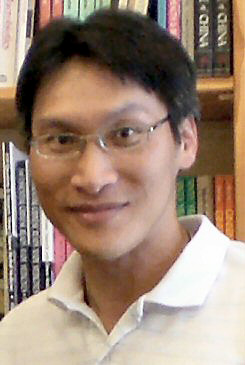
- Zheng at a book reading in 2007
- Born: May 29, 1969 (age 57); China
- Education: Associate of Arts
- Occupation: President
- Employer: New Breath Foundation
- Spouses: Shelly Smith (2005–?); Lisa Lee (2012–present)
- Children: One daughter

Chinese name
- Traditional Chinese: 鄭小飛
- Simplified Chinese: 郑小飞
- Hanyu Pinyin: Zhèng Xiăofēi
- Yale Romanization: Jehng Síufēi
- Website: Official Instagram

Xiaofei "Eddy" Zheng (鄭小飛; born May 29, 1969) is a Chinese American youth counselor in Oakland, California. His decade-long attempts to secure release from prison for crimes he committed at the age of 16 and to fight US deportation made his case a cause célèbre in the Asian American community. Following his release, he joined the Community Youth Center of San Francisco, where he seeks to steer at-risk immigrant youth away from crime, and also works with the Asian Prisoner Support Committee to assist released prisoners to reintegrate into society.

In 2017, he founded the nonprofit organization, the New Breath Foundation.

== Early life ==
Zheng grew up in Guangzhou in southern China. His father was an officer in the People's Liberation Army for the Guangzhou Military Region, while his mother worked as an accountant for the government. He was the youngest of three siblings, with an older sister and brother. Zheng immigrated to the United States with his family in 1982. They moved into a one-bedroom apartment in Oakland's Chinatown. His father worked at Burger King, while his mother was a live-in babysitter for another family. He rarely saw his parents and suffered difficulties in school due to his poor English skills. He befriended other Chinese immigrant youths in his school, who began to push him towards crime such as petty shoplifting; Zheng was arrested for stealing a jacket from a Macy's store, and placed under probation.

On the evening of January 6, 1986, Zheng and two friends broke into the house of a family who owned several shops in San Francisco's Chinatown by ambushing them with guns as they came home from work. They locked their two children in the bathroom and tied up the husband and wife; they also tore off the wife's clothes and pretended to take pictures of her using a camera with no film in it in an effort to intimidate her and get her to reveal the house's hiding places for valuables. After several hours spent ransacking the house in unsuccessful attempts to find a safe they believed held cash, they forced the wife to drive them to one of the family's stores and unlock it for them so they could also steal goods from there, including expensive Chinese herbal medicines. One accomplice remained at home to watch the husband and the two children. In total, they robbed $34,000 in cash, jewelry, and merchandise. They were caught and arrested almost immediately after the commission of their crime, pulled over by a police officer for driving without headlights on the way back to their victims' house to drop the wife off.

Zheng's family had no money to hire a lawyer in his defense; they urged him to plead guilty because they were under the impression that it would bring him a more lenient sentence. Just aged 16 at the time, Zheng was tried as an adult and convicted of 16 felony counts including kidnap-robbery, and sentenced to seven years to life in prison. He had an interpreter and a public defender during his trial, but reportedly did not understand most of the legal language used and did not even realize he had been sentenced to life in prison until after the trial when he arrived at the California Youth Authority where he would begin to serve his sentence. His lawyer was supposed to ask the judge for a judicial recommendation against deportation but failed to do so, an omission which would bring later legal difficulties for Zheng.

== Imprisonment ==
Zheng was later transferred to San Quentin State Prison, where he ended up serving as a model prisoner. He taught himself English through reading romance novels, and passed the GED in one attempt. In the 1990s, he entered into San Quentin's associate degree program, where he developed friendships with a number of the volunteers—mostly area university students—who acted as teachers in the program. He also held crime prevention workshops, giving lectures to at-risk immigrant youth who visited the prison in an effort to steer them away from a life of crime. His parents attempted to keep his imprisonment a secret; in an essay written some years later, Zheng recalled how his mother lied to relatives that he was busy with school when he failed to show up for his grandparents' funerals. For the first decade, he committed no major disciplinary infractions. He applied for parole for the first time in 1992. In 1998, at his fifth parole hearing, the parole board voted unanimously to recommend his release, making Zheng one of the fewer than one percent of those sentenced to life in California prisons to receive a positive recommendation for parole. However, then-governor of California Gray Davis returned the parole recommendation to the board for reconsideration, as he did with all but eight of the 340 parole recommendations he received during his tenure as governor.

Zheng met Shelly Smith, a volunteer English tutor in 1999 and began to develop a friendship with her which would later blossom into a romantic relationship. However, prison officials began to view Zheng as a troublemaker, in contrast with his previously excellent disciplinary record. One major incident came in March 2002, when he and fellow inmates began efforts to set up courses in Asian American studies for prisoners; they even circulated a petition. This provoked prison officials to accuse Zheng and other signatories of organizing an escape attempt; their cells were searched, writings were confiscated, and Zheng was accused of having worked with his teachers in the prison education program to have writings smuggled out, allegedly contravening California Code of Regulations, Title 15, Section 3020, which states that "inmates may participate in the publication and distribution of an inmate publication only with the institution head’s specific approval". Zheng was placed in solitary confinement for eleven months as punishment.

The publicity surrounding Zheng's case, bolstered as a result of his solitary confinement, began to result in increasing sympathy from the Asian American community. A number of prominent Californians wrote letters in support of his parole, including then-California State Senators Mark Leno and John Burton, as well as activist Yuri Kochiyama. In July 2004, he also began to maintain a blog on Blogspot.com, by sending letters to a friend on the outside who would then post them online, garnering further publicity for his case. In November 2004, the parole board again recommended that Zheng be released; the new governor Arnold Schwarzenegger did not object, and Zheng was released from San Quentin on March 10, 2005.

== Life after prison ==
=== Deportation hearings ===
Zheng's release from San Quentin did not mean freedom; officers of the Department of Homeland Security immediately took him into federal custody pending deportation proceedings, and transferred him to the Yuba County Jail. While still in custody, he married Smith in a ceremony in July 2005. The judge who would hear Zheng's deportation case then granted a postponement of the hearing so that Zheng could pursue a deportation waiver by virtue of his being married to a U.S. citizen. In 2005, prominent San Franciscans including Board of Supervisors member Jake McGoldrick and pastor Norman Fong wrote letters to the Board of Immigration Appeals in opposition to Zheng's deportation. At his deportation hearings in 2006, California Department of Corrections director Jerry Enomoto urged the judge to let Zheng remain in the United States, asserting that Zheng had significantly reformed himself while in prison and that society would benefit if he were released to receive a fresh start. His lawyer also argued that Zheng, as a Christian, might face persecution if returned to China. However, in July 2006, the immigration judge ordered his deportation.

U.S. Immigration and Customs Enforcement requested the Chinese embassy to the U.S. provide a travel document to Zheng so that he could be deported; the embassy responded that the Chinese government initially could find no record of Zheng and needed more time to perform research. Under United States immigration law as applied since the Supreme Court cases Zadvydas v. Davis (2001) and Clark v. Martinez (2005), a person awaiting deportation may not be held indefinitely, even if deportation cannot be effected due to refusal of the country of origin to receive the person, unless the person falls into a narrow category of those who present a danger to the public due to mental illness or another reason. Other persons may be released from custody after being held for 90 days. After an initial refusal to release Zheng from custody, the Department of Homeland Security set Zheng free on February 27, 2007. However, he still faced the possibility that he could be deported back to China.

In December 2010, Zheng appealed his deportation order to the Ninth Circuit Court. Zheng's lawyer Zachary Nightingale contended that the deportation review process had been handled incorrectly. Supporters also circulated a petition calling on lame duck California governor Arnold Schwarzenegger to grant Zheng a pardon before the end of his gubernatorial term in January 2011; by the end of 2010, the petition had garnered nearly a thousand signatures and was reported in China's People's Daily. On May 6, 2011, judges Mary M. Schroeder, Sidney R. Thomas, and Ronald M. Gould of the Ninth Circuit Court ruled that the case be returned to the Board of Immigration Appeals for a new hearing. Schroeder, writing the unanimous opinion, stated that the board had erred in failing to consider Zheng's value to the community and the opinions of community members when ruling on deportation. Zheng was quoted as saying that the news would make a wonderful Mother's Day present for his mother. His mother remains in San Francisco, while his elder sister moved to Hong Kong in 2008. Nightingale for his part reacted with optimism, stated that with the ruling in hand, Zheng had "a really good shot" at convincing an immigration judge to permit him to remain in the country.

=== Later activities ===
After his release, Zheng became involved in community work with the Community Youth Center in San Francisco. His anthology of Asian and Pacific Islander prisoner writings, Other: An Asian & Pacific Islander Prisoners' Anthology, was published in March 2009 with a preface from Helen Zia. His poetry has also been published in the Kartika Review. He also served as a member of the San Francisco Central Police Station Citizen Advisory Board, a board member of Chinese for Affirmative Action, a national advisory board member of the Asian American Law Journal, and co-chair of the Asian Prisoners' Support Committee.

In June 2011, Zheng also emerged as one of five co-chairs of the Run Ed Run campaign along with Rose Pak, Planning Commission President Christina Olague, Assistant District Attorney Victor Hwang, and Progress for All chief consultant Enrique Pearce. The campaign aimed to convince San Francisco mayor Ed Lee, who was appointed to his position to succeed Gavin Newsom, to run in the November 2011 mayoral election. Lee appointed Zheng to the Southeast Facility Community Commission in 2013.

Zheng married his current wife Lisa Lee on December 31, 2012; San Francisco Board of Supervisors member Jane Kim performed the marriage. His first daughter was born in late 2013. In March 2014, the San Francisco Board of Supervisors passed a resolution calling on California Governor Jerry Brown to grant him a full pardon and allow him to remain in the United States. John Avalos, London Breed, David Campos, David Chiu, Malia Cohen, Mark Farrell, Jane Kim, Eric Mar, and Katy Tang voted in favor, while Scott Wiener and Norman Yee were excused from voting. Mayor Lee did not sign the resolution, so it came into effect without his signature. Zheng received his pardon in April 2015. Following the pardon, immigration officials withdrew the deportation order against him. He naturalized as a U.S. citizen in January 2017.

Zheng supported Bernie Sanders' run for nomination for the 2020 presidential election.

== New Breath Foundation ==
In 2017, Zheng founded and became President of New Breath Foundation a philanthropic foundation focused on offering services for Asian American & Pacific Islander (AAPI) new immigrants and refugees, people impacted by incarceration and deportation, and survivors of violence.

New Breath Foundation publicly launched in November 2019 and funds multiple organizations including AAPI Women Lead, Survived & Punished, among others.

== Reactions ==
Elizabeth Ouyang of Columbia University's Center for the Study of Race and Ethnicity described Zheng's case as part of a pattern of lawful permanent residents convicted as youths in the 1980s and 1990s becoming targets of immigration laws passed after their convictions, in particular two laws passed in 1996: the Illegal Immigration Reform and Immigrant Responsibility Act and Anti-Terrorism and Effective Death Penalty Act. Increasingly aggressive enforcement of these laws in the aftermath of the September 11 attacks meant that a number of Asians who had grown up in the United States faced removal to countries in which they had not lived since they were children.

In September 2011, Ben Wang, Christine Kwon, and Deann Borshay-Liem began raising funds through Kickstarter to create a documentary on Zheng's life, tentatively titled Breathin: The Eddy Zheng Story. Their documentary won the audience prize at the Center for Asian American Media Film Festival in 2016.

The children of the victims of Zheng's robbery and kidnapping have criticized what they describe as the Asian American community's lionization of Zheng, and supported his deportation in spite of their agreement that he has been rehabilitated. In interviews, the children described the effect of the crime on their parents, noting that they installed extensive security systems in their home afterwards and even once hired a private detective to protect them as they walked to school. The elder sibling was quoted as saying, "He was Asian, but he robbed an Asian family. So the Asian community that is standing up for him should realize there is an Asian family that is a victim at the same time". Others also spoke out in favor of deporting Zheng, such as the California Coalition for Immigration Reform, whose northern California chairwoman Carole Blalock reportedly stated in 2005, "A lot of politicians are saying, 'Gee, look what he's done (in prison)' ... [l]et's remember what he did do and the victims. They're never going to forget that".
