= Shawna Yang Ryan =

American novelist

- Born: California
- Education: University of California, Berkeley (BA); University of California, Davis (MA)
- Occupations: Author; novelist; short story writer; professor
- Writing career
- Genres: Novel, literary fiction, historical fiction
- Notable works: Green Island (2016), Water Ghosts (2009)
- Notable awards: AAAS Book Award (2018), American Book Award (2017), Elliot Cades Emerging Writer Award (2015), UC Davis Maurice Prize (2006)
- Website: www.shawnayangryan.com

Shawna Yang Ryan
- Chinese: 楊小娜
Transcriptions

Shawna Yang Ryan is a Taiwanese American novelist, short story writer and creative writing professor, who has published the novels Water Ghosts (2009) and Green Island (2016). She taught in the Creative Writing Program at the University of Hawaiʻi at Mānoa.

== Background ==
Ryan was born in Sacramento, California, and was the mixed-race or Hapa child of parents who met during the Vietnam War: her mother was born in Taiwan and the daughter of Chinese immigrants who fled the mainland in 1949 with Chiang Kai-shek, and her European father grew up all around Europe and America, eventually meeting her mother while stationed in Taiwan.

Ryan graduated from the University of California, Berkeley, where she received her bachelor's degree, and also received a Master of Arts (M.A.) degree in Creative Writing from the University of California, Davis. Ryan was also a former Fulbright Scholar in Taiwan during 2002. Previously, she lived in Honolulu, Hawaii and taught in the Creative Writing Program at the University of Hawaiʻi at Mānoa. She currently lives in northern California.

== Work ==
=== Novels ===
==== Water Ghosts ====
Ryan's debut novel was Water Ghosts, initially published in 2007 by a small press in Berkeley known as El Leon Literary Arts under the title Locke 1928. In 2008, about half a year after the novel was initially released, Shelf Awareness gave the book a positive review, which a literary agent read prompting them to contact Ryan, eventually signing her and selling the book to Penguin Press. Ryan says in an interview that she "had tried for years to get an agent, and to have one email [her] out of the seeming blue one day was one of the biggest shocks of [her] life". In 2009, the novel was published by Penguin Books as Water Ghosts. The novel ended up becoming a San Francisco Chronicle Bestseller, the 2006 winner of the Maurice Prize, a finalist for the 2008 Northern California Book Award, and longlisted for the 2010 Asian American Literary Award. Booklist also called the novel "accomplished and affecting," while The Boston Globe stated that Ryan was "a writer to watch."

Water Ghosts is about a Chinese bachelor town in central California in the 1920s, inspired by the real-life town of Locke, California. The main character, Richard Fong, has not seen his wife (who lives in China), for over ten years. He also runs a casino called Lucky Fortune and has practically given up on the idea of seeing her, deciding to start an affair with a white prostitute who works in the town at Poppy See's Brothel. However, one day his wife appears and he is forced to reconcile his past in China and his present in America.

==== Green Island ====
Ryan's second novel, Green Island, was published in 2016 by Alfred A. Knopf (Knopf). To write the novel, Ryan performed extensive research while traveling Taiwan and reviewing older archive material in print and online, stating in an interview with The New York Times: "I often thought of my research as similar to unraveling a sweater — I’d tug at one thread, and a whole sleeve would come undone — one interviewee would introduce me to another, who’d introduce me to another, and so on. I lived in Taipei for a few years and traveled all over the island. I watched films and found old home movies and commercials in the archives and on YouTube. I bought music, vintage picture books and travelogues. I sifted and sifted until I felt I had a handle on the material world I was trying to depict." The book received positive reviews from Booklist (starred review) ("[An] engrossing epic...[a]bsorbing and affecting, this powerful tale explores the bond between a father and daughter, the compromises they are forced to make, and the prices they pay in their quest for freedom") and Kirkus Reviews ("Epic...The narrative works movingly on many different levels but especially on the personal and the political"). "Green Island" was also blurbed by, Viet Thanh Nguyen, the Pulitzer Prize-winning author of The Sympathizer.

The novel tells the story of a Taiwanese family known as the Tsais, who survive the February 28 incident of 1947 and are forced to live through the tumultuous decades that follow as Chiang Kai-shek’s Kuomintang (or Nationalist Party), begins its martial law rule of the island. The 228 incident marks the start of a massacre overseen by Kuomintang soldiers from mainland China, where 10,000 to 30,000 Taiwanese citizens were murdered due to protesting the rule of the KMT. For over five decades prior to the KMT’s arrival, Taiwan thrived as an industrialized country bolstered by an efficient Japanese infrastructure — whereas China was poorer, and comprised mostly farmers — therefore, leading to a conflicting clash of cultures. After the Japanese surrendered during the aftermath of WWII, the KMT took control of the island in 1945. Furthermore, after losing the Chinese Civil War to the Communists in 1949, the rest of the KMT escaped from the mainland en masse across the Taiwan Strait, establishing what is known today as the Republic of China on the island of Taiwan.

The novel won an American Book Award in 2017 from the Before Columbus Foundation.

=== Short fiction ===
Ryan's short stories have appeared in ZYZZYVA ("The Abandoned Elders"), Swill Magazine ("Failure to Commit"), Asian American Literary Review ("The End of February", a text piece accompanying an oil and canvas painting done by Sean Kim known as "Untitled", and "Marginalia"), Kartika Review ("Driving Home"), and the Berkeley Fiction Review ("Rime of The Sweaty Girl"). The short story entitled "Marginalia" that Ryan published in the Fall 2013 issue of The Asian American Literary Review was also nominated for a Pushcart Prize.

== Awards ==
=== Literary awards ===
Year	Work	Award	Category	Result	Ref
2006	Water Ghosts	Maurice Prize	—	Won	
2008	Water Ghosts	Northern California Book Award	—	Shortlisted	
2010	Water Ghosts	Asian American Literary Award	—	Longlisted	
2015	—	Elliot Cades Emerging Writer Award	—	Won	
2016	Green Island	Goodreads Choice Award	Historical Fiction	Nominated	
2017	Green Island	American Book Award	—	Won	
2018	Green Island	AAAS Book Award	Creative Writing	Won	

=== Additional distinction ===
Green Island (2016) (Knopf)

- Amazon Best of 2016—so far
- Amazon Best Book of the Month, February 2016
- IndieBound Indie Next Pick, March 2016
- Penguin Random House International One World One Book selection
- The Straits Times Bestseller
- The Boston Globe Pick of the week

Water Ghosts (2009) (Penguin Press)

- San Francisco Chronicle Bestseller
- First published as Locke 1928 (2007) by El Leon Literary Arts (Berkeley, CA)

== Bibliography ==
=== Novels ===
- —— (2009). Water Ghosts (hardcover 1st ed.). Penguin Press. ISBN 9781594202070.
- —— (2016). Green Island (hardcover 1st ed.). Knopf. ISBN 9781101874257.

=== Short stories ===
- "Marginalia", The Asian American Literary Review, "Mixed Race in a Box", Issue 4.2 (Fall 2013): n. pag. (Nominated for a Pushcart Prize)
- "Untitled" (with Sean Kim) (Oil on canvas and text), The Asian American Literary Review, "Mixed Race in a Box", Issue 4.2 (Fall 2013): n. pag.
- "Failure To Commit", Swill Magazine, Issue 6 (Summer/August 2012)
- Ryan, Shawna Yang (January 2011). "The End of February". Asian American Literary Review. 2 (1): 197. EBSCOhost 84015698.
- "Driving Home", Kartika Review, Issue No. 7 (Spring 2010)
- "The Abandoned Elders", ZYZZYVA, Issue No. 77 (Fall 2006)
- "Rime of The Sweaty Girl", The Berkeley Fiction Review, Issue 19 (1999)
