= Connie Chan =

Connie Chan may refer to:

- Connie Chan (actor) (born 1947), Chinese actor
- Connie Chan (politician) (born 1978), California politician
