= Quickly =

Bubble tea chain

Kuai Ke Li Enterprise Co. Ltd.
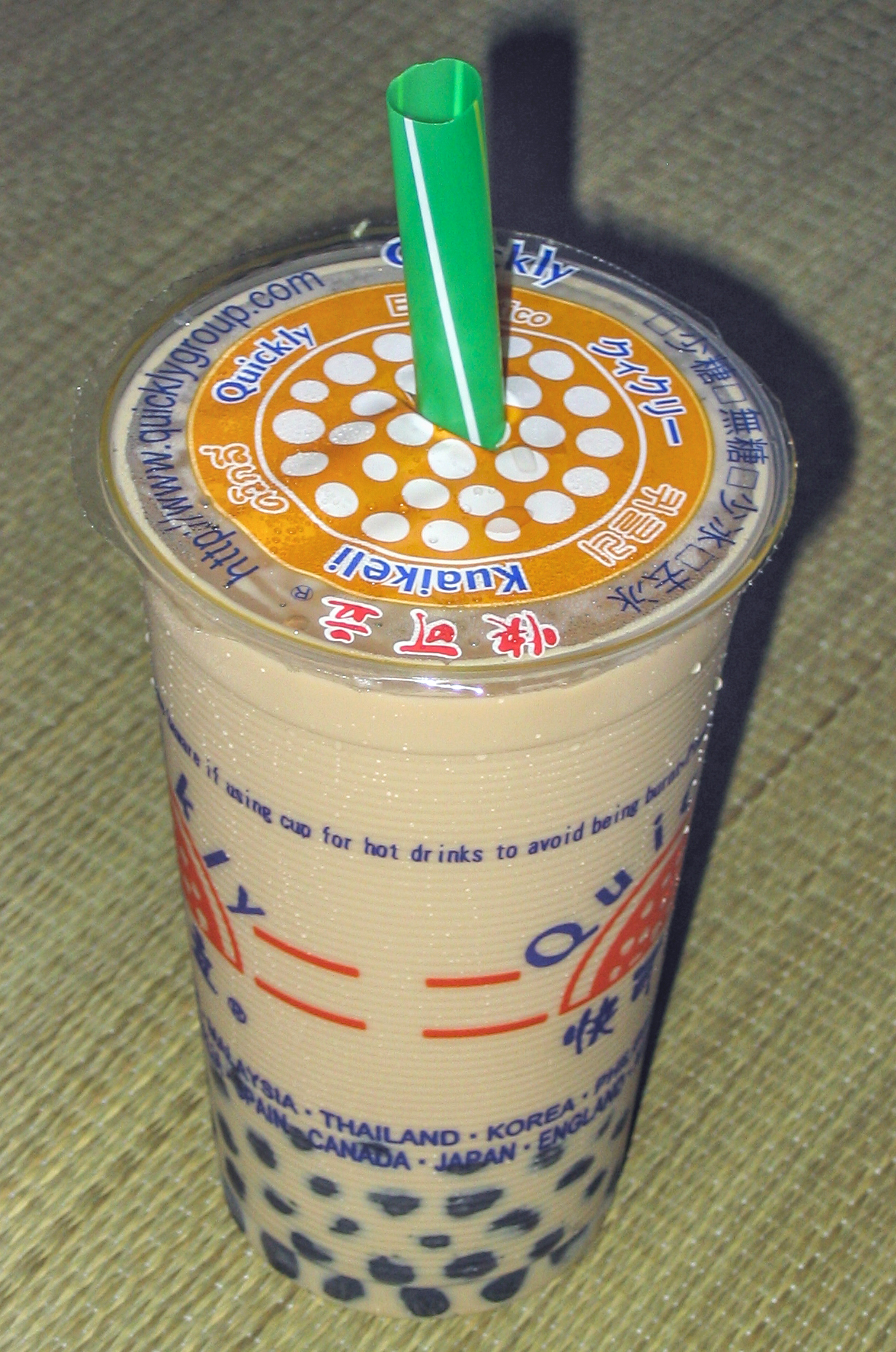
- Bubble tea from Quickly, with black tapioca pearls at the bottom of the cup
- Trade name: Quickly
- Native name: 快可立
- Company type: Private
- Founded: 1996; 30 years ago
- Founder: Nancy Yang
- Headquarters: New Taipei City, Taiwan
- Key people: Nancy Yang
- Products: Bubble tea
- Website: kuaikeli.com

Quickly (Chinese: 快可立; pinyin: Kuàikělì) is a tapioca milk tea franchise, with over 2000 locations in Africa, Asia, Europe, and North America. Quickly is the brand name of Kuai Ke Li Enterprise Co. Ltd., which was founded by Nancy Yang in Taiwan and started franchising.

Quickly was founded in California in 1996 and started its trademark licensing program at the same time. Quickly began marketing themselves as a New Generation Asian Fusion-style cafe in the United States, as opposed to just a tapioca drink shop. Most locations offer free Wi-Fi internet access.

On 17 May 2008, Quickly officially launched their new age non-fat tart frozen yogurt at the SingTao Asian Expo. The frozen yogurt became available at their key locations the following week. In March 2010, Quickly officially launched their Hong Kong style egg puff (Chinese: 雞蛋仔; pinyin: JiDanZai) which became available at all their locations in Northern California.

Quickly stores in San Francisco became the center of former Supervisor Ed Jew's extortion controversy, where he solicited bribes estimated at $84,000.

The corporate motto of Quickly Group USA is "Just Use It! "

== See also ==
- List of companies of Taiwan
