= Maurice Prize =

The Maurice Prize, a literary prize celebrating unpublished fiction, was established by John Lescroart, and has been awarded annually since 2005. The prize is hosted jointly by Lescroart and the University of California, Davis English Department. The prize is a gift from Lescroart in honor of his father, Maurice, for whom the contest is named. The prize was increased from $5,000 to $10,000 beginning in 2022.

It is awarded for the best sustained work of fiction (a novel, novel in stories, or other sustained book-length prose fiction form) submitted by alumni who have not yet published or had a book-length manuscript in fiction accepted for publication by the contest deadline. Literary merit is the predominant criterion in selecting the winning entry. It is Lescroart's hope to inspire UC Davis graduates to publish their literary work.

== Recipients ==
Year	Author	Work	Notes	References
2005	Spring Warren	The Breaks	—	
2006	Shawna Yang Ryan	Water Ghosts	Originally released as Locke 1928	
2007	Elizabeth Chamberlin	these people, they crawl all over the place	—	—
2008	Melanie Thorne	Hand Me Down	—	—
2009	Angie Chau	A Map Back to You	Released as Quiet As They Come	—
2010	Melinda Moustakis	Bear Down, Bear North	—	—
2011	Maria Kuznetsova	The Accident	—	—
2012	Cora Stryker	The Evolution of Flight	—	—
2013	Naomi Williams	Landfalls	Published by Farrar, Straus and Giroux in 2015	—
2014	Kiik Araki-Kawaguchi	Poor as You Are, My Heart, Don’t Grieve Here in Earth	—	—
2015	Reema Rajbanshi	Sugar, Smoke, Song	—	—
2016	Megan Cummins	Beasts	—	
2017	Ben Hinshaw	Exactly What You Mean, A Novel in Stories	—	
2018	No prize awarded		Program hiatus	—
2019	Peter Shahrokh	A Wind Will Come	—	—
2020	Laura Marsh	SAV AGE(S)	—	—
2021	No prize awarded		—	—
2022	Kirk Colvin	Bloodless Coup	—	—
2023	Jessica Guerrieri	Between the Devil and the Deep Blue Sea	—	—
