= Connie Chan (politician) =

American politician (born 1978)

- 陳詩敏
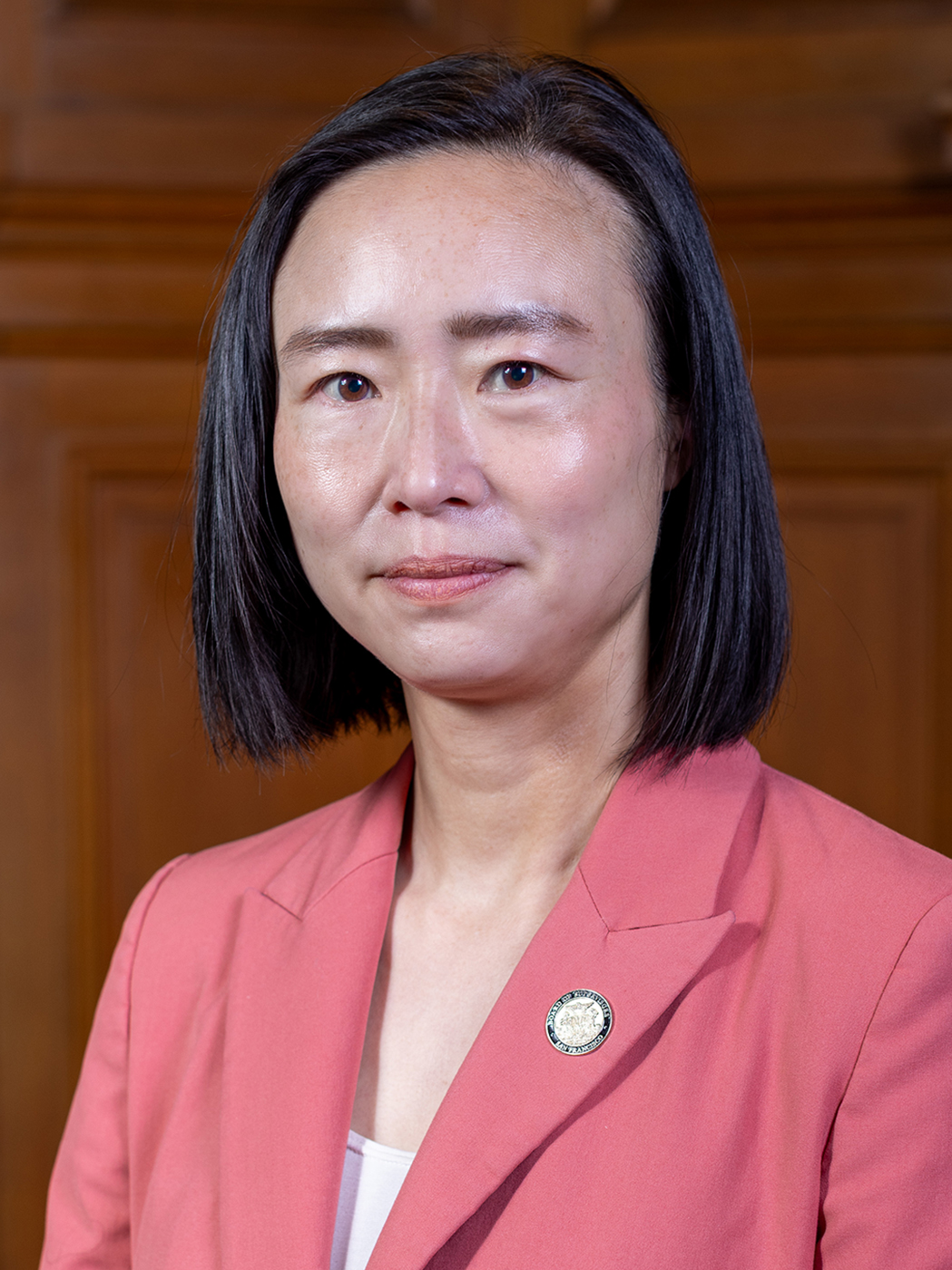
- Official portrait, 2025

Member of the San Francisco Board of Supervisors from the 1st district
- Incumbent
- Assumed office January 8, 2021
- Preceded by: Sandra Lee Fewer

Personal details
- Born: Chan Sze-man; October 3, 1978 (age 48) Hong Kong
- Party: Democratic
- Education: University of California, Davis (BA)
- Website: Board website; Campaign website

Chinese name
- Traditional Chinese: 陳詩敏
- Simplified Chinese: 陈诗敏
Transcriptions
Standard Mandarin
- Hanyu Pinyin: Chén Shīmǐn
Yue: Cantonese
- Jyutping: Can4 Si1 Man5

Connie Chan (born Chan Sze-man, October 3, 1978; Chinese: 陳詩敏) is an American politician serving as a member of the San Francisco Board of Supervisors for District 1 since January 8, 2021, after defeating Marjan Philhour in 2020, and again in 2024. Chan is a progressive Democrat. District 1 includes the Richmond, Lone Mountain, Sea Cliff, and Presidio Terrace neighborhoods, and parts of Golden Gate Park.

== Early life, education, and career ==
Connie Chan was born Chan Sze-man in British Hong Kong on October 3, 1978, to a police officer father and a social worker mother and the family moved to Taiwan when she was five years old. Her family then immigrated to the Chinatown neighborhood of San Francisco when she was thirteen years old, where she quickly changed her name to Connie Chan—after the Chinese-American news anchor Connie Chung–due to the suggestive pronunciation of her birth name in English. She attended high school at the Galileo Academy of Science and Technology and earned her bachelor's with a double major in Religious Studies and Classical Chinese at the University of California, Davis.

Chan was a spokesperson for the San Francisco Recreation and Parks Department and City College of San Francisco. She also worked for the San Francisco Zoo and Gardens. At various points, Chan was an aide to Supervisor Sophie Maxwell, San Francisco District Attorney Kamala Harris, and Supervisor Aaron Peskin.

== San Francisco Board of Supervisors ==
=== 2020 election ===
Two days after incumbent Supervisor Sandra Lee Fewer announced she would not seek re-election in 2020, Chan (a resident of the Richmond District) announced her candidacy for the open District 1 seat. Fewer endorsed Chan to be her successor. She also received the endorsement of two former supervisors who held the seat, Eric Mar and Jake McGoldrick.

In the November 2020 general election, Chan won by 125 votes against challenger Marjan Philhour, a senior adviser to Mayor London Breed. In their November 2024 rematch, Chan defeated Philhour by 1,301 votes, a bigger margin than in their first race. Philhour, a more conservative candidate, had previously run for the seat in 2016, but was defeated by Fewer.

=== Tenure ===
Chan was sworn into office on January 8, 2021.

Chan supported legislation by Supervisor Dean Preston to create a city-run public bank. In February 2021, Chan supported a plan to provide free Summer Activities for San Francisco's elementary school students.

In February 2021, Chan and Peskin called upon the city controller and Budget Analyst's Office to investigate the San Francisco Parks Alliance, amid a debate on whether to renew the city's contract with the Alliance to operate the SkyStar Wheel, a Ferris wheel at Golden Gate Park. Chan and fellow Supervisor Aaron Peskin blocked a decision by the San Francisco Historic Preservation Commission to extend the wheel's stay through 2025, referring it to a vote in the Board of Supervisors. Instead of the Commission's proposal for a four-year extension, Chan and Peskin proposed a one-year extension, citing complaints from Ferris wheel opponents regarding the wheel's bright lights and electric generator, which they said might injure wildlife, as well as the San Francisco Parks Alliance's linkage to a corruption investigation. The Board of Supervisors rejected the Chan/Peskin proposal on a 6–5 vote.

During the 2022 recall of District Attorney Chesa Boudin, Chan opposed the recall effort. This stance drew scrutiny as it diverged from the voting patterns of her constituency; in Chan's own District 1 (Richmond), 57% of residents voted in favor of the recall. Additionally, polling indicated that 67% of Asian American and Pacific Islander voters citywide supported the recall, leading to criticism from constituents that her opposition was out of step with the community's concerns regarding public safety.

As chairman of the Board of Supervisors, Peskin appointed Chan as chair of the Budget Committee, whose other members were Supervisors Myrna Melgar and Joel Engardio. As Budget Committee chair, Chan supported extension of the COVID-19 pandemic-era CalFresh emergency benefits and called for eventually making the Muni system fare-free.

Chan disagreed with several of Mayor Breed's key priorities. Chan and other supervisors, along with the mayor, ultimately negotiated a $14.6 billion budget, which ended a $780 million deficit that had emerged in the two years of the pandemic, and largely preserved Breed's major proposals on public safety and economic policy. The budget included close to $63 million in additional funding for San Francisco Police Department, representing an 8.5% increase in the department's budget. Chan opposed Breed's separate proposal for an additional $27 million supplemental appropriation to SFPD. The budget also adopted a compromise negotiated between Breed and supervisors regarding funding of the San Francisco emergency homeless shelter network. The budget adopted a limited version of Breed's proposal to offer tax incentives to firms opening new offices in downtown San Francisco.

==== Positions on housing and transit ====
In 2020, while running for the Board of Supervisors, Chan expressed support for building more denser housing along Geary Boulevard and other major thoroughfares, but only if the new developments were affordable housing; Chan also argued that building more market-rate housing does not increase housing affordability.

In 2021, Chan voted to block the development of 495-unit apartment complex (one-quarter of which were designated as affordable housing) on a Nordstrom's valet parking lot next to a BART station. The 8–3 vote in the Board of Supervisors was highly controversial. Although one-quarter of the units were designated as affordable, community and labor groups criticized the project's lack of family-sized units and open-space planning. Chan said she supported building “the right housing in the right places,” prioritizing projects that met neighborhood needs and contributed to long-term affordability.

In 2021, Chan supported the reopening of the Great Highway (a two-mile stretch of road bypassing the Outer Sunset) to cars. Auto access to the Great Highway had been closed between Sloat and Lincoln Way during the COVID-19 pandemic and turned into a walkway.

In a 2022 vote in the Board of Supervisors' Rules Committee, Chan and Peskin voted down a proposal (supported by Supervisor Ahsha Safaí and Mayor London Breed) to place a referendum on the city ballot to streamline the permitting process for certain housing developments; San Francisco takes substantially longer to approve housing permits than other California municipalities. Breed described the vote as "obstructionism."

In 2022, Chan introduced legislation to streamline approvals for 100 percent affordable housing projects meeting the city's labor and environmental standards. Chan and the owners of the long vacant Alexandria Theatre announced the City and the building owner were exploring a development agreement to convert the former movie theatre into 76 housing units, with affordable housing units on-site. In 2025, Chan sponsored legislation establishing a special-use district to enable redevelopment of the Alexandria Theater site into approximately 75 housing units—many designed as two- and three-bedroom apartments—of which at least 12 percent are reserved as affordable. The ordinance also preserved significant architectural elements, including the building's blade sign, marquee, interior murals, and chandelier.

In December 2023, Chan and Peskin asked the city attorney to sue the State of California to challenge the implementation of SB 423, a new California law (sponsored by state Senator Scott Wiener of San Francisco) that allowed streamlined approval for housing development projects. In their letter, Chan and Peskin asserted that the law unfairly discriminated against San Francisco, and that San Francisco had sufficiently produced market-rate housing. Wiener criticized Chan's and Peskin's letter as an attempt to encourage the filing of a "frivolous lawsuit" and criticized city authorities for creating "extreme impediments" to resolving the San Francisco housing shortage.

In response to SB 423, the San Francisco Board of Supervisors passed a package to reform San Francisco's housing permitting and review process, by a 9–2 vote, with Peskin and Chan opposing.

==== Tenant protections ====
Chan has placed tenant rights and eviction prevention at the center of her housing agenda. In 2022, she co-sponsored San Francisco's first-in-the-nation “Union-At-Home” ordinance, which allows tenants of multi-unit buildings (five or more rental units) to form associations that collectively bargain with landlords over repairs, rent increases, and building conditions. The legislation was designed to strengthen tenants’ organizing power following the COVID-19 pandemic, when renters in several large complexes had sought rent relief and maintenance improvements through informal associations.

In February 2025, Chan publicly pledged to prevent the eviction of homeless families from city-funded hotel rooms and shelter programs, calling for additional rental assistance and coordination between the Department of Homelessness and community-based organizations to keep vulnerable families housed.

=== 2024 election ===
Chan sought reelection in 2024, running again against Philhour in a rematch of the 2020 race. The race was described as "hotly contested" by the San Francisco Chronicle. As was the case in the campaign four years earlier, Chan ran as a progressive while Philhour has run as an establishment-oriented pragmatist.

Chan won her reelection in a count that was called on November 11. The final vote tally after the ranked-choice election was 51.90% for Chan and 48.10% for Philhour.

== 2026 congressional campaign ==
Chan announced her 2026 candidacy for California's 11th congressional district on November 20, 2025, after incumbent Nancy Pelosi stated on November 6 that she would retire at the end of her term. Pelosi endorsed Chan on May 18, 2026. Chan and state senator Scott Wiener advanced to the general election in the June 2 primary.Chan lost to Wiener in the November 3 general election, receiving 140,395 votes (46.7%) to Wiener's 160,400 (53.3%).

== Personal life ==
Chan's longtime partner, Ed, is a member of the San Francisco Fire Department. The couple have a son.
