= Carmen Chu =

American politician (born 1978)

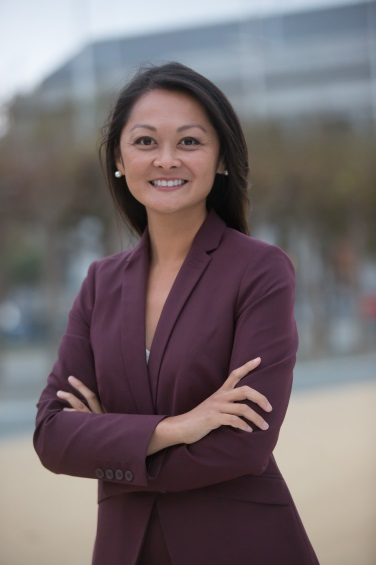

City Administrator of San Francisco
- Incumbent
- Assumed office February 2, 2021
- Preceded by: Naomi M. Kelly

Assessor-Recorder of San Francisco
- In office February 27, 2013 – February 1, 2021
- Preceded by: Phil Ting
- Succeeded by: Joaquin Torres

Member of the San Francisco Board of Supervisors from District 4
- In office September 25, 2007 – February 27, 2013
- Preceded by: Ed Jew
- Succeeded by: Katy Tang

Personal details
- Born: April 8, 1978 (age 48) Los Angeles, California
- Party: Democratic
- Education: Occidental College; UC Berkeley
- Website: sf.gov/profile/carmen-chu

Carmen Chu
- Chinese: 朱嘉文
Transcriptions
Standard Mandarin
- Hanyu Pinyin: Zhū Jiāwén
- IPA: [ʈʂú tɕjáwə̌n]
Yue: Cantonese
- Yale Romanization: Jyu1 Ga1-man4
- Jyutping: Zyu1 Gaa1-man4

Carmen Chu (Chinese: 朱嘉文; pinyin: Zhū Jiāwén; born April 8, 1978) is an American politician serving as City Administrator of the City and County of San Francisco. She previously served as the city's assessor-recorder, where she was the only Asian-American assessor elected to serve among the 58 counties in the State of California. Prior to being elected assessor-recorder, Chu served as a member of the San Francisco board of supervisors, where she served two terms as the chair of the board's budget and finance committee, and was a board director of the Golden Gate Bridge, Highway and Transportation District. Before joining the board of supervisors, Chu served as deputy budget director in the mayor's office of public policy and finance. In July 2022, she was appointed to the Regents of the University of California by Governor Gavin Newsom.

== Early life ==
Chu is the second of three daughters to Hung Wing and Shuet Ying Chu, who immigrated from Hong Kong in the 1970s with ancestry in Taishan. The Chu family settled into a number of jobs to make ends meet including initially working as a seamstress or as a restaurant worker before starting their own small family restaurant. Chu has stated that growing up in an immigrant family and in a small business household were formative experiences in her life as she never forgot the struggles immigrants and those with limited English face nor the hardships associated with running a small business.

== Education ==
In 2000, Chu earned a bachelor's degree in public policy from Occidental College where she was a recipient of the James Irvine Foundation Scholarship – a program focused on the development of leaders and educational opportunities for city youth. She graduated from Occidental College magna cum laude and Phi Beta Kappa.

In 2003, Chu earned a master's degree in public policy from UC Berkeley as a distinguished Public Policy and International Affairs (PPIA) fellow – a fellowship program with a mission to promote underrepresented groups in public service and to advance roles in leadership positions.

== San Francisco Assessor-Recorder ==
On February 6, 2013, Chu was appointed by Mayor Ed Lee to serve as assessor-recorder; the post was left vacant after Phil Ting was sworn into the California State Assembly. In November 2013, Chu successfully ran for election and became then the only San Francisco elected female representative in a citywide position. Chu ran again in 2014 and was elected to a full term on November 4, 2014, with 98% of the vote.

Under Chu, San Francisco adopted a new electronic real estate and land use records system.

=== Same-Sex Marriage ===
When the State of California announced a resumption of same-sex marriages on June 28, 2013, Chu committed to keeping her office open through that first weekend of resumption so that same-sex couples did not have to wait any longer to marry. That weekend, 479 marriage licenses were recorded with the City and County of San Francisco. The City and County of San Francisco was the only County Recorder's Office to remain open that first weekend in the State of California. In 2013 Chu turned over public marriage licenses that were invalidated in 2004 to the San Francisco Public Library's Archival Division to ensure the historic preservation of documents filed during a pivotal and defining moment in the movement for marriage equality.

== San Francisco City Administrator ==
Chu was nominated by Mayor London Breed to replace departing city administrator Naomi Kelly in January 2021. After confirmation by the board of supervisors, Breed conducted Chu's swearing-in ceremony on February 2, 2021.

== San Francisco Supervisor ==
On September 25, 2007, she was appointed to replace the embattled San Francisco Supervisor Ed Jew, who was then suspended for alleged official misconduct. The District 4 seat remained vacant for five and a half hours until Mayor Newsom appointed her to succeed Jew for the remainder of Jew's term. Chu ran for election after Jew's term expired, and on November 4, 2008, she was elected by the voters as supervisor of District 4 for the term January 2009 to January 2011. Chu was re-elected as supervisor representing the Sunset/Parkside District for a four-year term in November 2010.

Chu worked on legislation that incentivized local small businesses to do work for the city by streamlining the city's contracting process; provided protections to tenants who are victims of domestic violence; strengthened regulations, coordinated enforcement and expanded community review of establishments in neighborhood commercial corridors; advocated for and improved neighborhood libraries, parks and playgrounds, and directed local funding for neighborhood commercial revitalization efforts including facade improvements, free assessments for compliance with Americans with Disabilities Act, installation of parklets and major street resurfacing efforts. Chu worked with the local Public Utilities Commission to develop the largest municipal solar project in the country at the time. The rooftop of the Sunset Reservoir, a project which would provide clean energy for municipal buildings.

=== Fiscal Stewardship ===
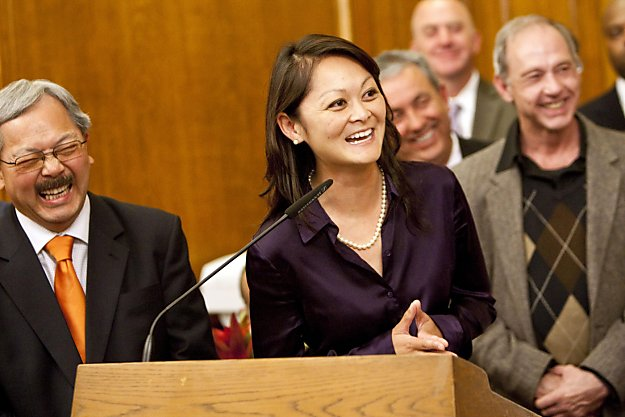
Chair of the Board's budget and finance committee for the 2011-2012 and 2012-2013 budgets.

As supervisor, Chu chaired the board's budget and finance committee for the 2011–2012 and 2012–2013 budgets and served as a member of the committee in all but one year while in office. Working with the mayor, community leaders, city departments and labor, the 2011–2012's $6.83 billion budget preserved funding for critical city services while closing a General Fund deficit of $380 million. In 2012–2013, Chu again chaired the budget and finance committee, where she led the development of San Francisco's first two-year budget, a good government initiative designed to recognize the ongoing long-term budget impacts of annual budget decisions. The 2012–2013 budget included key measures to back-fill state funding cuts to childcare subsidies for San Francisco's working families and was the first year of a multi-year plan to fund the recruitment and back-filling of critical public safety positions in the police and fire departments.

== SF Mayor's Office of Public Policy and Finance ==
Prior to her time on the board of supervisors, Chu served as the deputy director of the mayor office of public policy and finance – the division charged with balancing the city and county's annual appropriations. Chu worked on projects such as the development of the city's first 311 Customer Service Center – a centralized point of access to City services available to residents 24 hours a day, seven days a week. Under Chu's direction, San Francisco was awarded the Distinguished Budget Presentation Award in 2006–2007 from the Government Finance Officers Association for the annual proposed budget document.

== See also ==
- History of the Chinese Americans in San Francisco
