= Kartika Review =

Literary magazine

- Discipline: Asian American literature
- Language: English

Publication details
- History: 2007–present
- Publisher: Kartika Review (United States)
- Frequency: Quarterly
- ISO 4: Find out here

Links
- Journal homepage

The Kartika Review is a quarterly literary magazine that publishes literary fiction, poetry, and essays that endeavor to expand and enhance the mainstream perception of Asian American creative writing. The journal also publishes book reviews, author interviews, and artwork relevant to the Asian Diaspora. Kartika Review sponsors readings, panel discussions, writing contests, and other creative activities for the Asian American community in both New York City and the Bay Area, California.

The journal launched in September 2007 and has featured work from prominent members of the Asian American arts community, such as Gene Luen Yang, a Finalist for the 2006 National Book Award and winner of the 2007 Printz Award, Kelly Zen-Yie Tsai, a spoken word poet, and Eddy Zheng, a Chinese American writer and activist who spent over 19 years in federal prison. Forthcoming in the next scheduled issue would be author interviews with Li-Young Lee and Don Lee, and contributions from Russell C. Leong, a professor at UCLA and editor of the Amerasia Journal.
