= Ed Jew =

American politician and businessman (born 1960)

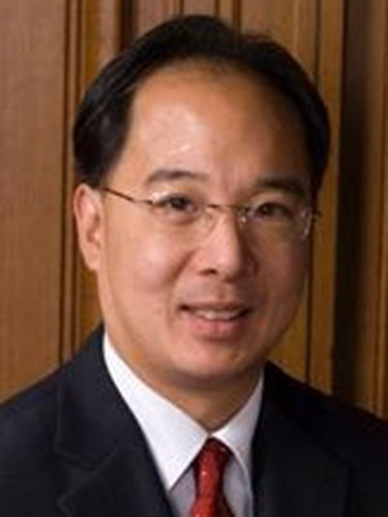
- Official portrait, c. 2006–2007

Member of the San Francisco Board of Supervisors from District 4
- In office December 5, 2006 – January 10, 2008; Suspended: September 25, 2007 – January 10, 2008
- Preceded by: Fiona Ma
- Succeeded by: Carmen Chu

Personal details
- Born: 1960 (age 65–66) San Francisco, California, U.S.
- Party: Democratic
- Other political affiliations: Republican; Independent
- Spouse: Lorene (Lisa) Jew
- Children: 1
- Education: San Francisco State University; Golden Gate University
- Profession: Businessman; Politician

Chinese name
- Traditional Chinese: 趙悦明
- Simplified Chinese: 赵悦明
Transcriptions
Standard Mandarin
- Hanyu Pinyin: Zhào Yuèmíng
Yue: Cantonese
- Jyutping: ziu6 jyut6 ming4
- Criminal information
- Born: 1960 (age 65–66); San Francisco, California
- Conviction: Guilty
- Criminal charges: Bribery; Mail fraud Extortion; Perjury
- Penalty: Bribery/extortion: 64 months in prison and $10,000 fine Perjury: 12 months in jail, 3 years in probation and $2,000 fine

Edmund Jew (born 1960) is an American former politician and businessman, who was convicted of extortion, bribery, and perjury in 2008.

He graduated from San Francisco State University with a degree in economics and later earned a master's degree in business administration at Golden Gate University. After spending several years as a businessman managing his family enterprises, he entered politics in the 1980s and went on to serve in various community organizations. In 1996, he was the volunteer liaison for then District 4 supervisor Leland Yee. In 2002, Yee successfully ran for a seat in the California Assembly, and Jew ran for Yee's seat on the Board of Supervisors in the 2002 election, but was defeated. When Yee's successor Fiona Ma in 2006 ran for state assembly, Jew again ran for supervisor in District 4, which comprises most of the Sunset District. After winning a highly competitive election decided by instant-runoff voting, he was elected to the San Francisco Board of Supervisors.

Six months after he took office, the FBI raided his office and homes for allegedly extorting money from small business owners in his district. Shortly after the raid, the city attorney began investigating Jew for violating residency requirements necessary to hold his supervisor position. In September 2007, he was suspended by Mayor Gavin Newsom and later resigned in the face of extortion and perjury charges. In late 2008, he pleaded guilty to both charges. He was sentenced to 64 months in federal prison for extortion, and a year in county jail for perjury.

== Personal life ==
Edmund Jew was born in San Francisco, California in 1960. The Jew family emigrated from China around the start of the 20th century. His grandfather James Jew, who arrived to the city in 1913, established an employment agency in 1925 and the Canton Flower Shop in Chinatown in 1927. He became a distinguished leader in the Chinese community after serving many local Chinese American associations.

Jew was raised in Chinatown. After graduating from McAteer High School, Jew attended City College of San Francisco and San Francisco State University, where he earned a degree in economics. In 1984, he also earned a Master of Business Administration degree from Golden Gate University.

Before entering politics, Jew was an entrepreneur. Among other enterprises, he managed his family's flower shop and owned a local taxi company named Howard Mock Jew, Inc. In addition, he invested in real estate. He bought his first property in San Francisco at the age of 21 and, as of 2002, he had a real estate portfolio (including properties in the Bay Area and Arizona) worth as much as $5 million.

As of 2007, Jew's wife Lorene and their daughter Cammie live in Burlingame, California. He also has a brother named David Jew.

== Political career ==
Jew began his political career in the 1980s, establishing the Chinese Neighborhood Resource Center, which helped to clean up alleyways in Chinatown. He was then appointed by the mayor to serve on the Ten Year Plan Council to End Chronic Homelessness and the Office of Aging Advisory Council, the later oversaw the city's senior services. Like his grandfather, Jew was heavily involved in local Chinese-American politics, serving as president of the Jew Family Benevolent Association, the Yeong Wo Benevolent Association, the Hay Sen Benevolent Association, the Hip Sen Benevolent Association, and the Lung Kong Benevolent Association. He was also an active participant of numerous other community organizations, such as the Northeast Community Federal Credit Union, the Chinese Holocaust Museum, the Sunset Residents Association, and the Sunset Parkside Education and Action Committee. Jew once served as vice chairman of the San Francisco County Republican Central Committee before re-registering as an Independent and then as a Democrat.

From 1996 to 2001, Jew was District 4 then-supervisor Leland Yee's volunteer community liaison. Jew first ran for Yee's District 4 seat in 2002 when Yee ran for the California State Assembly. Despite Yee's endorsement, Jew finished third, missing the runoff election. In 2006, Jew again ran for same supervisor seat when Fiona Ma ran for the California Assembly. Jew led other candidates including his top challenger Ron Dudum in the first round with 26% first-place votes. He eventually won the closely fought election after securing a 52% majority. In December 2006, Mayor Gavin Newsom appointed Jew to serve out the remainder of Ma's term; he took office in January 2007.

== Criminal activity, conviction and sentencing ==
=== FBI raid and extortion charges ===
On May 18, 2007, six months after Jew took office as supervisor, agents from the Federal Bureau of Investigation (FBI), armed with a federal warrant, raided his office at City Hall, his houses in San Francisco and Burlingame, and his Chinatown flower shop. The FBI sought evidence in Jew's computers and records regarding "potentially criminal allegations" surrounding an extortion attempt.

Jew said that he had been contacted by the owners of a local chain tapioca drink shop, Quickly, to resolve Quickly's business permit issues. Jew demanded $80,000 for his assistance, but agreed to accept $40,000. The shop owners then contacted the FBI, which supplied the cash for a sting operation. The FBI used an undercover agent to meet with Jew and hand over the money.

Jew claimed that he turned over the money to a man named Robert Chan from a land use consulting firm called Bridge Consulting, though this was never substantiated. He also asked that half of the money be donated to the Friends of Sunset Playground, a local organization set up to raise money for the renovation of a playground at 28th Avenue and Lawton Street. The donation was later rejected by the group's fiscal agency, Sunset Youth Services, after the directors, Dawn and Ron Stueckle and Delvin Mack learned the nature of the donation source.

On September 20, 2007, federal prosecutors charged Jew with one count of mail fraud in connection with extorting $80,000 from Quickly. Jew denied any wrongdoing. He questioned what influence he could have over the issuing of permits, and reiterated his refusal to resign his position, despite insistence from Mayor Gavin Newsom. On November 7, 2007, a federal grand jury added five felony charges, including two counts each of bribery and mail fraud and one count of extortion. He was also accused of accepting $4,000 in cash from the owner of another local business, Wonderful Desserts and Cafe. Jew pleaded not guilty to all charges.

=== Residency requirements violation ===
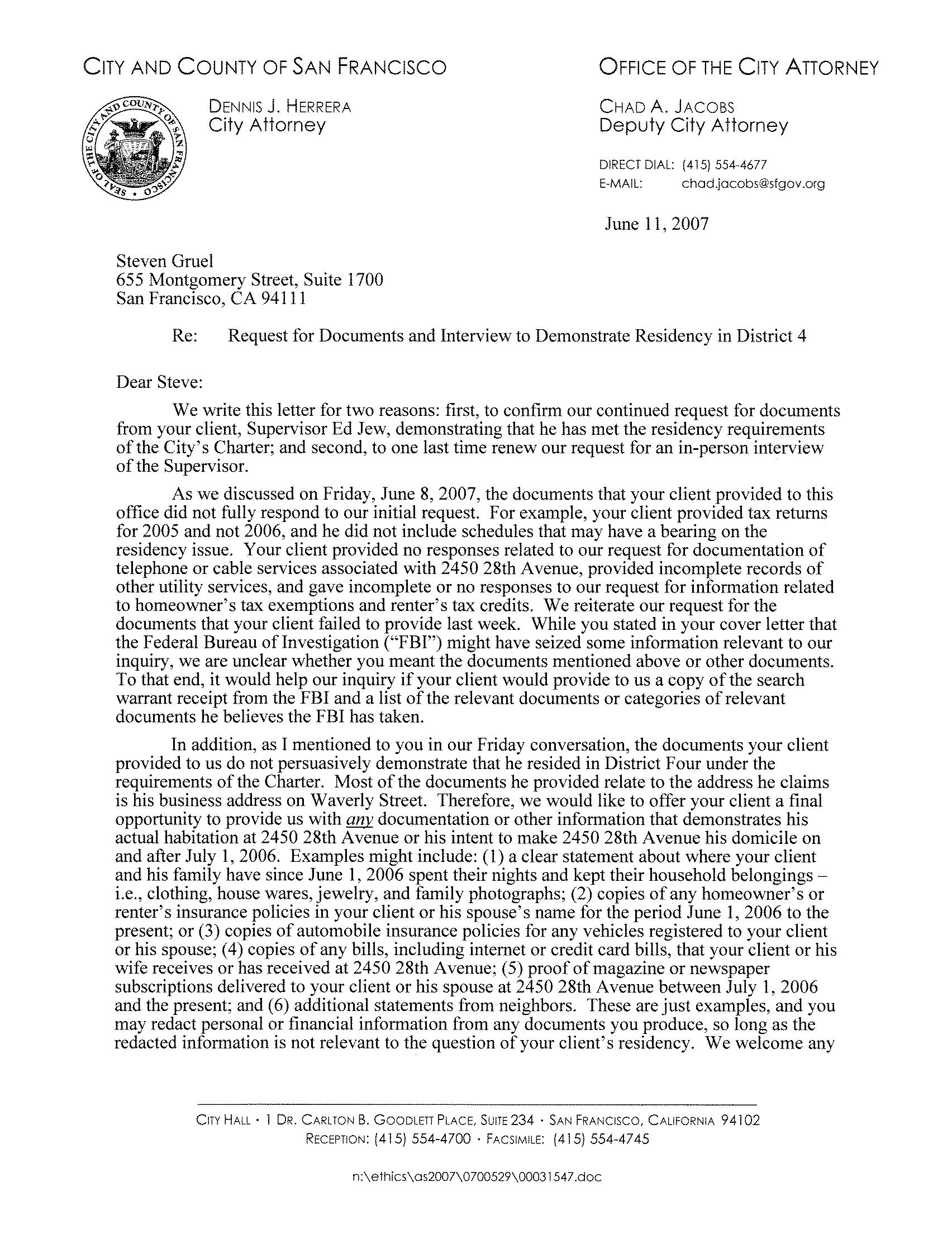
One of the letters sent by Herrera to Jew's defense attorney requesting the supervisor to provide more evidence regarding his residency

In late May 2007, following the FBI raid, questions surfaced about whether or not Jew actually lived in his San Francisco home, and whether or not Jew therefore met the residency requirements of his supervisor position. The house in question (on 28th Avenue in the Sunset District) was owned by his father, though Jew's neighbors said that the house was vacant and utility bills showed little to no usage of water or electricity. Jew claimed that he spent most of his time at his flower shop, but was not able to provide more information in response to City Attorney Dennis Herrera's formal requests.

On June 12, 2007, San Francisco District Attorney Kamala Harris issued a warrant for Jew's arrest, and charged him with nine felony counts of perjury, election code violations, voter fraud, and providing false documents. Jew turned himself in to the Burlingame Police Department.

On June 18, 2007, City Attorney Dennis Herrera sought approval from then California Attorney General Jerry Brown to remove Ed Jew from office. Citing records that showed little use of utilities and interviews with 32 neighbors, Herrera declared that Jew had violated the residency requirements of the City Charter by falsely claiming in his campaign papers that he was a resident of San Francisco. Mayor Gavin Newsom said the case against Jew was "very damning" and raised concern about Jew continuing to cast votes while the legitimacy of his residency was in question.

On July 4, 2007, Jew's attorneys issued a 138-page response to Herrera's petition, arguing that even if Jew had not lived full-time in his home in District 4, his election had not violated any laws. They also accused Herrara of political bias in bringing the charges. Herrera denied Jew's accusations, and released signed bank loan documents on which Jew had identified his address in Burlingame. On July 17, 2007, Jew pleaded not guilty to the perjury charges, and was granted bail after Jew agreed to surrender his passport.

During the preliminary hearing in late July, prosecutors presented testimonies from Jew's neighbors at both of his homes, indicating that Jew had never lived in his 28th Avenue house and spent most of his time in Burlingame. Testimony from a U.S. Postal Service inspector revealed that Jew's first-class mail went to Burlingame while junk mail went to his San Francisco address; prosecutors cited utility bills showing low usage of water and electricity at his 28th Avenue home, as well as loan applications that indicated he lived in Burlingame. In his defense, Jew produced a jury duty summons to indicate his address in San Francisco, and questioned the possible bias of the witnesses against him.

=== Suspension and resignation ===
On September 25, 2007, Mayor Gavin Newsom suspended Jew for alleged official misconduct and began the process of removing him from office. The city attorney also served Jew with civil charges of misconduct for allegedly lying about where he lived. Deputy budget director Carmen Chu was appointed as Jew's temporary replacement on the Board of Supervisors. On January 10, 2008, Jew tendered his resignation in exchange for Herrera and Newsom dropping both the civil lawsuit and misconduct proceeding before the Ethics Commission regarding his residency violation. In a letter, he noted that he resigned due to tremendous legal expenses and swore never to seek public office again in the best interest of his family. Chu became Jew's interim successor until the election in November 2008.

=== Guilty plea and sentencing ===
On October 10, 2008, Jew changed his plea to guilty on the federal mail fraud and extortion charges. The following month, he also changed his plea to guilty on the perjury charges.

On April 3, 2009, Jew was sentenced to 64 months in prison and fined $10,000 on the federal extortion charge. Prosecutors stated that he "preyed upon and victimized the very people whom he had proposed to support in his campaign: small business owners in the Sunset District." On April 22, 2009, he was sentenced to one year in county jail, three years of probation, and a $2,000 fine on the state perjury charge. Jew reported to a federal prison in Safford, Arizona on June 30, 2009. In June 2012, Jew was held at Taft Correctional Institution in Kern County, California.

=== After prison ===
In 2013, Ed Jew was released to a halfway house in San Francisco's Tenderloin area. In late 2014, he took up a low-paying job in a city-funded program targeting illegal garbage dumping in Chinatown, a position he still held in 2016.

Political offices
| Preceded by Fiona Ma | Member of the San Francisco Board of Supervisors; District 4; 2006–2007 | Succeeded by Carmen Chu |
