= Sandra Lee Fewer =

American politician

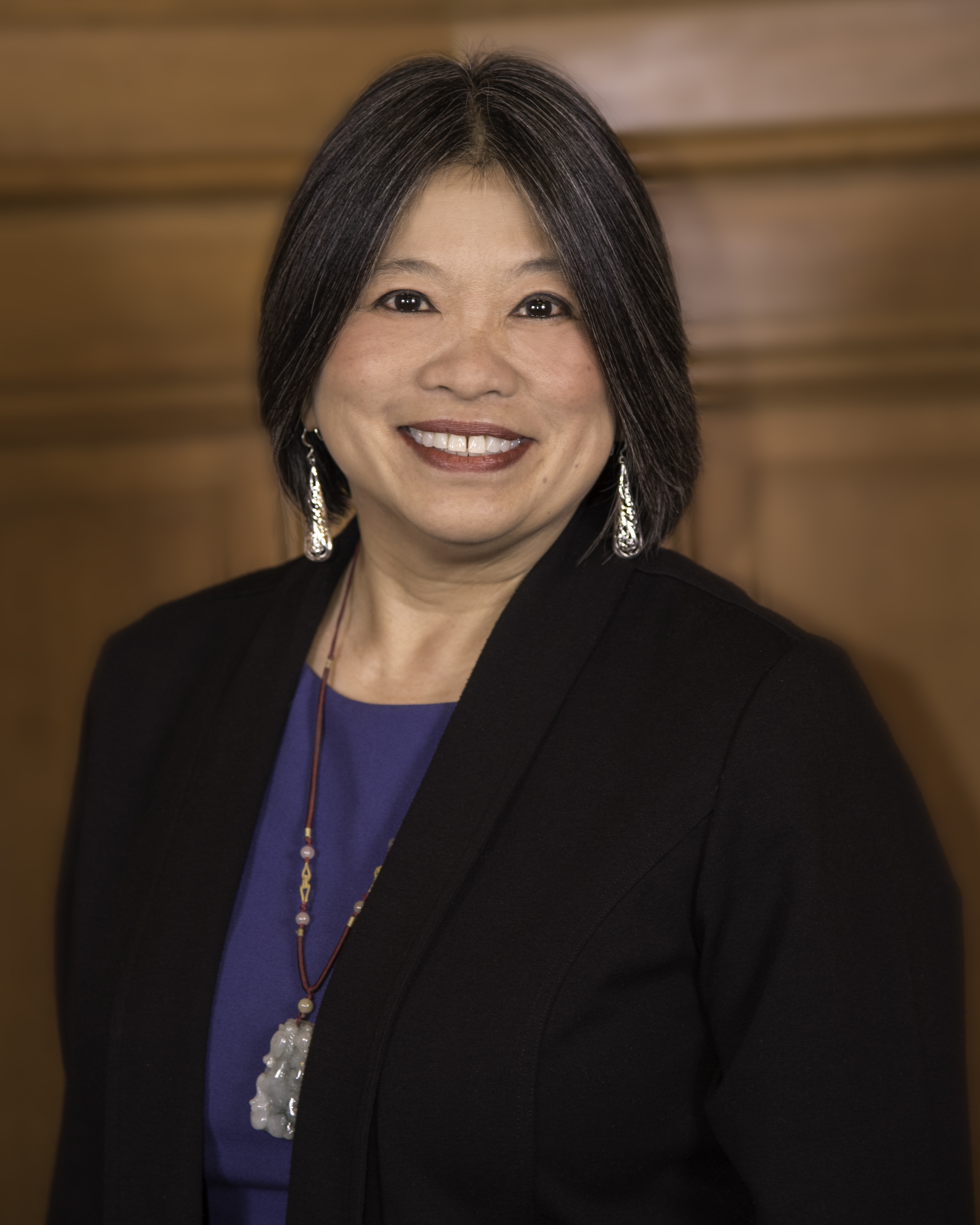
- Official portrait, 2017

Member of the San Francisco Board of Supervisors from District 1
- In office January 8, 2017 – January 8, 2021
- Preceded by: Eric Mar
- Succeeded by: Connie Chan

Personal details
- Born: 1956 or 1957 (age 69–70)
- Party: Democratic
- Education: City College of San Francisco; Golden Gate University (BA, MPA)
- Occupation: Politician
- Website: Board of Supervisors; District 1 website

Sandra Lee Fewer (Chinese: 李麗嫦; born 1956 or 1957) is an American politician who served as a member of the San Francisco Board of Supervisors for District 1 from the years 2017 to 2021. District 1 includes the neighborhoods of Richmond, Lone Mountain, Sea Cliff, Presidio Terrace and parts of Golden Gate Park.

== Early life and education ==
Fewer is a fourth-generation Chinese American, and a San Francisco native. Fewer attended City College of San Francisco before earning a Bachelor of Arts in justice administration and a Master of Public Administration from Golden Gate University.

== Career ==
Fewer was elected to the San Francisco Board of Education in 2008 and served for eight years. She was elected president of the school board in 2014.

From 2001 to 2009, Fewer served as a director for Coleman Advocates for Children and Youth. In June 2016, Fewer was elected to the San Francisco Democratic Party County Central Committee as the fourth highest vote getter in District 19, eleven places ahead of her main opponent in the District 1 race, Marjan Philhour.

Fewer was elected as the District 1 representative of the San Francisco Board of Supervisors in November 2016, replacing supervisor Eric Mar, who had reached his term limit. She was sworn in on January 8, 2017, becoming the first female supervisor of the Richmond district. Her election created a female majority on the Board of Supervisors for the first time in 20 years. Fewer opted not to run for re-election, retiring from the Board of Supervisors at the conclusion of her term in January, 2021.

== Legislative record ==
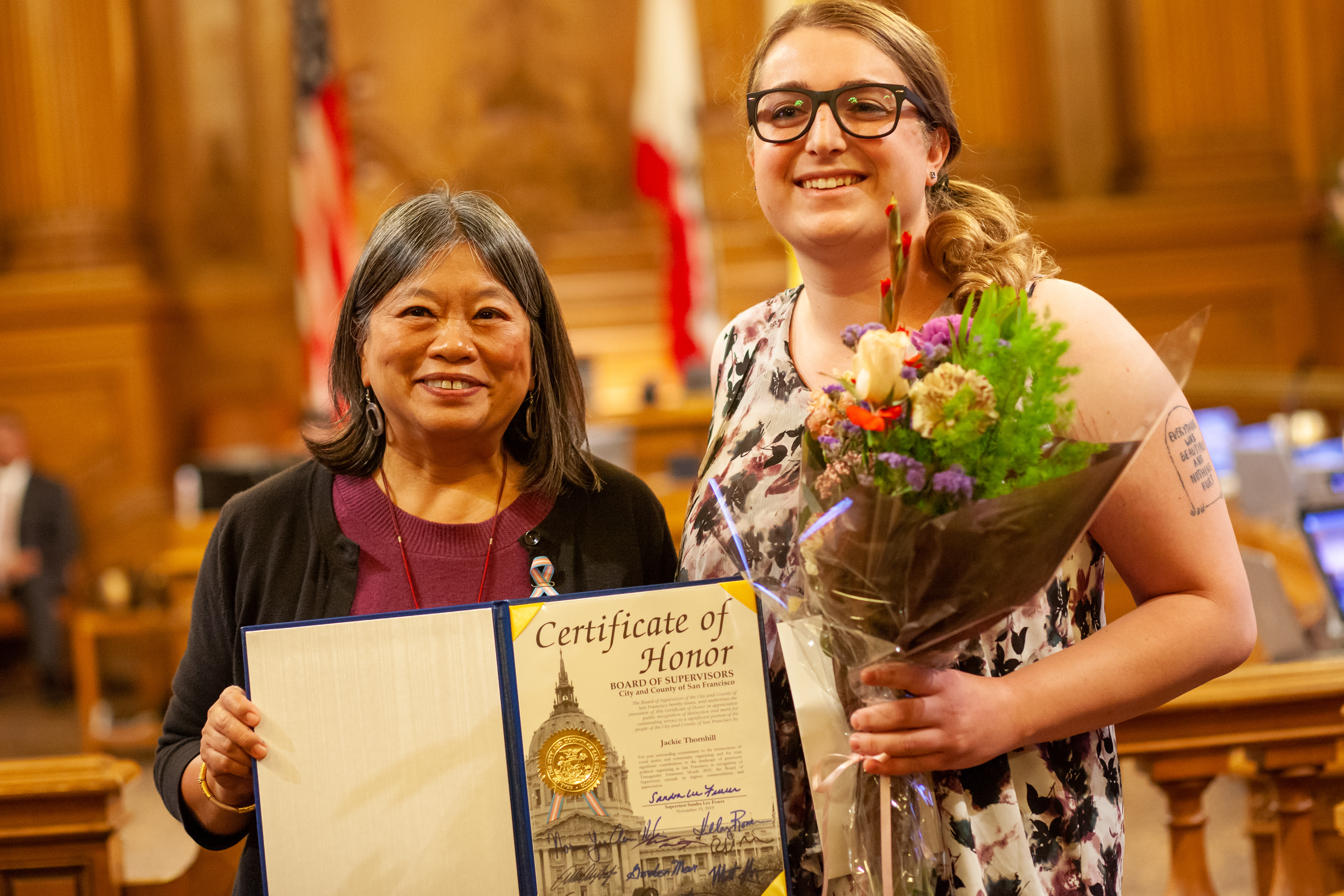
Fewer presents her Administrative Aide, Jackie Thornhill, with a certificate of honor in recognition of Transgender Awareness Month in November, 2019.

Fewer authored numerous pieces of legislation addressing housing policy, including the Community Opportunity to Purchase Act giving affordable housing non-profits right of first offer to purchase buildings on the market, and legislation setting aside half of all new excess property tax revenue for a fund dedicated to the production of affordable housing. Fewer also authored Prop E, a ballot initiative to rezone public land and large lots for development of 100% affordable housing that passed with 76.3% of the vote in November, 2019, secured a state grant to create a Westside Affordable Housing Development Organization, and allocated funding to bring mobile homeless services to her district.

Fewer also focused on disaster preparedness and response both before and during the COVID-19 pandemic. Early in her term, she secured $205 million for an expedited expansion of the city's auxiliary water supply system, built in 1913, which historically left much of the Westside and outer neighborhoods of San Francisco vulnerable to fires. In March and April 2020, Fewer and her staff worked to improve communication between the Board of Supervisors and the city's Emergency Operations Center.

Fewer authored legislation to create an Office of Racial Equity, and the "People Over Profits" ordinance, which prohibits the city from profiting off of communication services such as phone calls and price markups within the jail commissary. The measure is built off of London Breed and Vicki Hennessy's efforts in June 2019 calling for similar reduction in fines. It was unanimously passed by the Board in July 2020. Fewer also authored legislation accelerating the closure of the City's Hall of Justice jail, and secured funding for the creation of an Immigrant Defense Unit in the San Francisco Public Defender's Office.

Fewer added 12 small businesses in her district to the City's Legacy Business Registry throughout her term, and authored legislation requiring landlords to register vacant and abandoned storefronts, providing the City with previously unavailable data on commercial retail vacancies. Fewer worked with Assemblymember Phil Ting to secure a $2 million state grant to renovate the Golden Gate Park dog training area.

Fewer founded the "One Richmond" program and annual community party, with the expressed principles of inclusivity, taking care of one another, taking care of the community, and supporting small businesses by shopping and eating locally, summarized by the term "doing your one Richmond thing." She also worked with local merchants associations and nonprofits to expand San Francisco's annual Autumn Moon Festival to the Richmond neighborhood, and organized annual community health fairs in the Richmond to connect residents with free health screenings and other resources.

Fewer was a vocal opponent of former President Donald Trump throughout her term, authoring a resolution calling on Congress to impeach him in late 2017, and referring to him as "a psycho person."

== Conflict with SFPOA ==
On November 5, 2019, at an election night party for then-candidate for district attorney Chesa Boudin, Fewer participated in a chant of "fuck the POA", referring to the San Francisco Police Officers Association. SFPOA president Tony Montoya called for Fewer to apologize, calling her words "worrisome and completely unacceptable and unbecoming of someone elected to represent all San Franciscans."

In an open letter, Fewer apologized to SFPD officers but not the SFPOA, whose leadership she described as having "a long and sordid history of opposing police reforms, publishing explicitly racist and anti-immigrant rhetoric, and directly threatening their critics, including my colleagues on the Board of Supervisors, myself and my husband, and its own members."

Fewer's claim that the SFPOA leadership threatened her were later substantiated when Mission Local published an email in which former POA President Gary Delagnes threatened to release the disciplinary records of Fewer's husband, a retired SFPD officer. Delagnes doubled down on his threat in the article, telling Mission Local editor Joe Eskenazi that "you can tell Sandra the next time she opens her mouth, I'm going to release John's record." Current POA President Tony Montoya publicly apologized to Fewer on behalf of the organization during a discussion over a new contract for the City's police officers at a Board meeting in late 2020.

== Personal life ==
She and her husband, former San Francisco police officer John Fewer, raised their three children in the Richmond district, where she has lived for over 50 years.

== Selected awards and recognition ==
- Champion of Justice award, Chinese for Affirmative Action
- Parent Leadership award, Bay Area Parent Leadership Action Network
- Community Leadership award, Coleman Advocates
- Community Ally award, Harvey Milk Democratic Club

== See also ==
- History of Chinese Americans in San Francisco
