= David Campos (politician) =

American politician (born 1970)

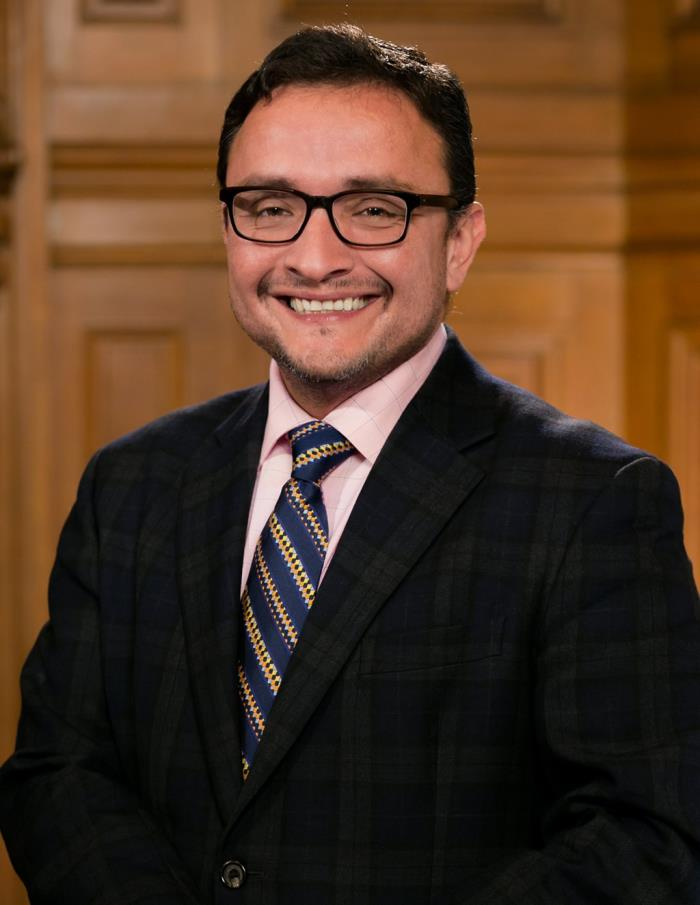
- Official portrait, 2015

Member of the San Francisco Board of Supervisors from the 9th district
- In office December 4, 2008 – January 9, 2017
- Preceded by: Tom Ammiano
- Succeeded by: Hillary Ronen

Personal details
- Born: September 28, 1970 (age 55) Puerto Barrios, Guatemala
- Party: Democratic
- Spouse: Phil Hwang
- Education: Stanford University (BA); Harvard University (JD)
- Website: Campaign website

David Campos (born September 28, 1970), is a politician who is Vice Chair of the California Democratic Party. In 2008 he was elected to the San Francisco Board of Supervisors, where he represented San Francisco's District 9 (Bernal Heights, Portola, and the Inner Mission) until 2016 when he termed out.

== Early life and career ==
David Campos was born in Puerto Barrios, Guatemala. His father was a meteorologist. His family first tried to cross the border illegally when David was 11, but they were caught and deported. Around 1983, his father made it across the border and went to Los Angeles, where he became a carpenter. In 1985, at age 14, with his mother and two sisters, he fled Guatemala and emigrated illegally to the United States. Campos graduated from Jefferson High School in South Central Los Angeles. In 1993, he graduated from Stanford University with a degree in political science. While attending Harvard Law School from 1993 to 1996, Campos became a permanent resident of the United States and met his partner, Phil Hwang. They married in 2014.

Campos became Deputy City Attorney for the City and County of San Francisco in 1999. According to his biography on the Santa Clara County government website, Campos was Deputy City Attorney 1999–2004. Campos was general counsel for the San Francisco Unified School District from 2004 to 2007. While general counsel, Campos was on the San Francisco Police Commission 2005–2008.

== San Francisco Board of Supervisors ==
In 2008, David Campos was elected to the San Francisco Board of Supervisors, representing District 9 (Bernal Heights, Portola, and the Inner Mission), succeeding newly-elected State Assemblymember Tom Ammiano. Mayor Gavin Newsom appointed Campos to the vacant supervisorial seat on December 4, 2008, one month after the other freshman supervisors were elected in November 2008. His predecessor, Ammiano, had resigned from the San Francisco Board of Supervisors in early December to start his tenure at the California State Assembly.

Campos introduced legislation in August 2009 that sought to protect undocumented immigrant youths from deportation and separation from their families by the San Francisco police. The legislation would have required local authorities to wait for a criminal conviction before turning youth over to ICE.

In May 2013, the San Francisco Board of Supervisors unanimously passed Campos’s Health Care Access Buffer Zone legislation. The legislation created a 25-foot harassment free buffer zone around all free-standing health clinics in the city. The penalty for encroaching the buffer zone is up to a $1,000 fine or three months in jail. The ordinance also expands the federal Freedom of Access to Clinic Entrances Act, which makes it a federal offense to use physical force or intimidation to prevent a person from entering a reproductive health care facility.

In September 2012, San Francisco's supervisors voted 8-3 to approve Campos’s CleanPowerSF legislation. CleanPowerSF is a publicly owned clean energy program that allow residents to choose to buy electricity generated from renewable source rather than from PG&E, the dominant utility in the city. Ultimately, the plan will use the program’s revenue stream to help construct the city’s own renewable energy infrastructure, including wind and solar generators.

=== Positions on housing ===
During his tenure on the Board of Supervisors, an average of 157 residences (32 of which were subsidized units) were built in the Mission per year. According to one estimate, Campos opposed the construction of units capable of housing 6,058 people, including subsidized housing for 3,930 lower-income people. Among the developments that Campos opposed was a 2016 proposal to develop a lot containing an abandoned warehouse into housing for 227 people, including 45 low-income residents. Campos argued that the development would harm the vibrancy of his district. The proposal was blocked; by 2022, the lot still contained only an abandoned warehouse.

In 2015 and 2016, while he was on the San Francisco Board of Supervisors, Campos introduced proposals to prohibit the construction of market-rate housing in his district in San Francisco. While running for office in 2022, Campos said he had changed his view on banning market-rate housing. In 2016, Campos held rallies opposing a "density bonus" proposal whereby developers in San Francisco would be allowed to build taller buildings in exchange for increasing the number of affordable housing units in the buildings.

In April 2016, Campos introduced legislation that would fine short-term rental companies such as Airbnb $1000 a day for each listing that wasn't registered with the City of San Francisco. After the Board of Supervisors approved the legislation, Airbnb sued the City, claiming that the law violated the Communications Decency Act, which prohibits the government from holding websites accountable for the content published by users. Campos then introduced new amendments to the legislation to attempt to address the challenges in the lawsuit.

In 2021, Campos expressed opposition to a proposal to build 495 apartment units (25% of which would have been affordable housing) on a Nordstrom valet parking lot. Campos said that his position was not "anti-housing" – rather, he said that the apartments would cause displacement: "there is a very real fear of displacement of the people who live around [the parking lot]."

== California State Assembly ==
=== 2014 California State Assembly candidacy ===
On August 1, 2013, Campos filed papers at San Francisco City Hall to run for the California State Assembly seat in the 17th District (eastern half of San Francisco). Campos advanced to the general election with San Francisco Supervisor David Chiu in the primary on Tuesday, June 3, 2014, with 43 percent of the vote. Chiu won 48 percent of the vote and Republican candidate David Salaverry won 8.5 percent. Chiu beat Campos in the general election with 51 percent of the vote.

California's 17th State Assembly district election, 2014
Primary election
Party	Candidate	Votes	%
Democratic	David Chiu	34,863	48.0
Democratic	David Campos	31,951	44.0
Republican	David Carlos Salaverry	5,843	8.0
Total votes		72,657	100.0
General election
Democratic	David Chiu	63,041	51.1
Democratic	David Campos	60,416	48.9
Total votes		123,457	100.0
Democratic hold			

=== 2022 California State Assembly candidacy ===
By September 2021, Campos had announced his intention to run for the 17th Assembly District seat that would be vacated by David Chiu when he would become San Francisco City Attorney. In the special election held on February 15, 2022, Campos ended up in second place with 33,448 votes (35.67%). Since no candidate received 50% of the votes, the top two candidates, Campos and Matt Haney, moved onto the run-off election on April 19, 2022.

When filing his papers for candidacy for the special election, Campos listed his occupation as a "civil rights attorney". In a letter to the California Secretary of State, Matt Haney challenged the accuracy of that statement, arguing that the role of a DA’s chief of staff is to oversee operations and administration, not practice law. When the California Secretary of State rejected Haney's challenge, Haney filed a lawsuit against the office. In February 2022, Judge Shelleyanne Chang of the Sacramento Superior Court ruled in favor of Haney citing that the civil rights attorney designation was “misleading voters.” Judge Chang ordered that Campos could no longer list his occupation as a civil rights attorney or criminal justice attorney and must list his occupation as criminal justice administrator in the run off election ballot.

== Post-Supervisor Career ==
In March 2017, Campos was named one of seven deputy executives for Santa Clara County to lead the Division of Equity & Social Justice focused on LGBTQ, immigration, cultural competence, labor, and Census issues. During the COVID-19 pandemic, Campos coordinated government communications in non-English languages.

In September 2020, he became chief of staff for San Francisco District Attorney Chesa Boudin. In an interview, Campos cited the long commute to Santa Clara, and the opportunity to work on meaningful criminal justice reform as motivation to take the new job. In November 2021, Campos took a leave of absence from the Chief of Staff role. In December 2021, Campos was named in a lawsuit filed by a former investigator in the District Attorney's office. The plaintiff claimed that he was wrongfully terminated for reporting and punishing the office's violations of the Fourth Amendment to the United States Constitution.

Campos is one of two Vice Chairs of the California Democratic Party. Previously, he was a member of the San Francisco Democratic County Central Committee 2016–2021, and elected from within that body to be Chair of the San Francisco Democratic Party 2017–2021.

== See also ==
- LGBT culture in San Francisco
