= Eric Mar =

American politician (born 1962)

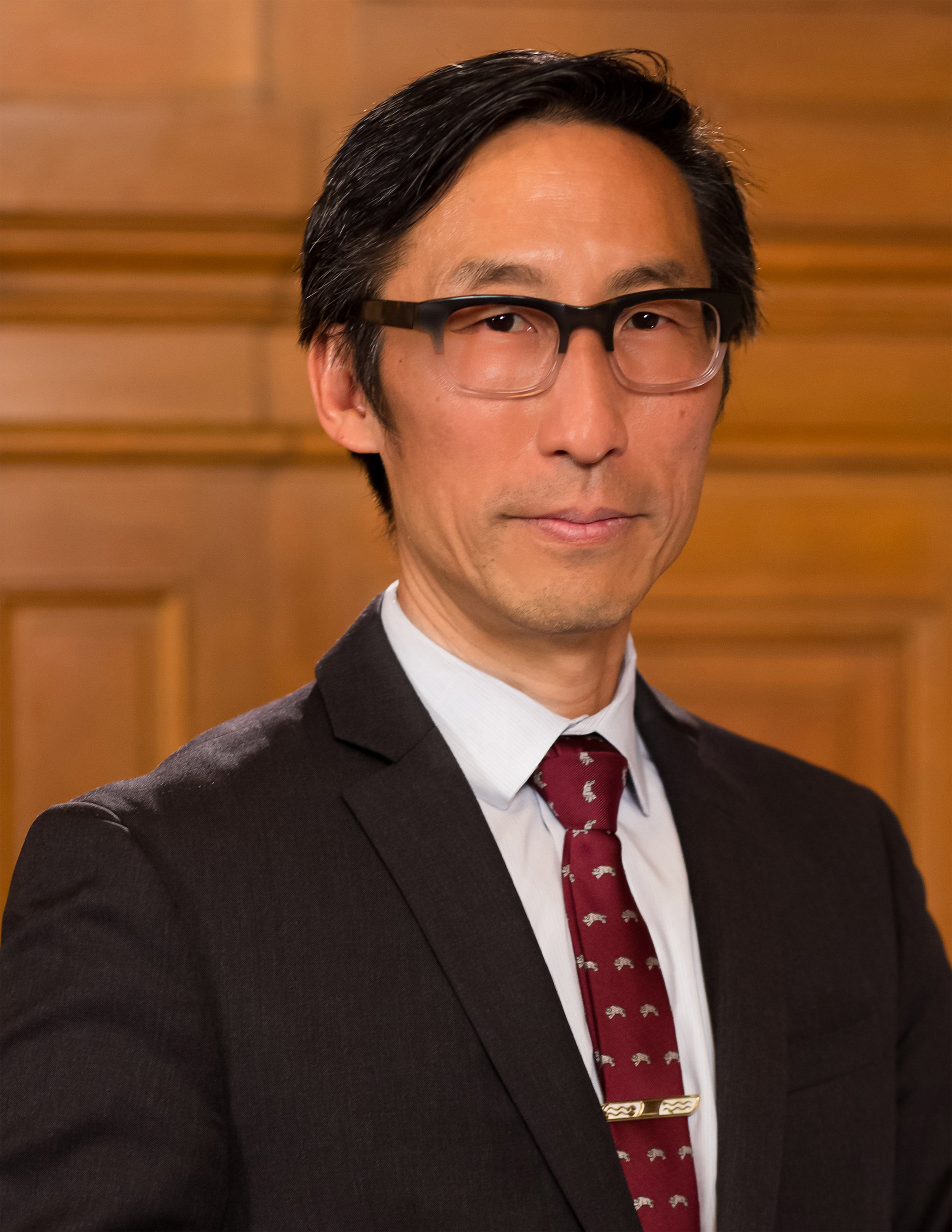
- Official portrait, 2015

Member of the San Francisco Board of Supervisors from the 1st district
- In office January 8, 2009 – January 8, 2017
- Preceded by: Jake McGoldrick
- Succeeded by: Sandra Lee Fewer

Personal details
- Born: Eric Lee Mar; August 15, 1962 (age 64) Sacramento, California
- Party: Democratic
- Education: University of California, Davis
- Occupation: Politician
- Profession: Asian American Studies teacher

Eric Mar
- Chinese: 馬兆光
Transcriptions
Standard Mandarin
- Hanyu Pinyin: Mǎ Zhàoguāng
- IPA: [mà ʈʂâʊkwáŋ]
Yue: Cantonese
- Yale Romanization: Ma5 Siu6-gwong1
- Jyutping: Maa5 Siu6-gwong1

Eric Lee Mar (born August 15, 1962) is an American former politician. He served on the San Francisco Board of Education and San Francisco County Democratic Central Committee. In 2008, he was elected to the San Francisco Board of Supervisors. He represented District 1.

== Early life and career ==
Born and raised in Sacramento, California, Mar went on to graduate from neighboring University of California, Davis with a Bachelor of Science degree. He received his Juris Doctor from the New College of California. Mar served on the Human Rights Committee of the State Bar of California and the Civil Rights Committee of the National Asian Pacific American Bar Association.

Mar was an adjunct lecturer at San Francisco State University from 1992 to 2008 and an assistant professor from 2-17 to 2020, teaching Asian American Studies and Ethnic Studies. From 1993 to 1997, Mar was the Assistant Dean for New College Law School in San Francisco, where he taught a course on critical race theory.

Mar is a board member of the Chinese Progressive Association and a founding member of Asians and Pacific Islanders for Community Empowerment and the Institute for Multiracial Justice. He is a past executive board member of the Bay Area Chapter of the National Lawyers Guild. In 1999, In 1998, Mar was elected to the San Francisco County Central Committee of the Democratic Party. Mar lived in the Richmond District for many years. Mar received the community service award from the Asian Pacific American Labor Alliance. He is a former shop steward for Service Employees International Union (SEIU) Local 790.

== San Francisco Board of Education ==
After his house burned down in April, 2000, Mar was ineligible to run for supervisor in District 1 as he had planned. Instead, he ran for the Board of Education, placing second. As a Commissioner for the Board of Education he

- Co-authored Proposition H in 2004 with then-Supervisor Tom Ammiano. It passed and provided up to $60 million a year to school programs for eleven fiscal years.
- co-created the Parent Advisory Council to the SFUSD, which strengthened parent, student and community involvement in SFUSD policy-making.
- served on the City and School District Select Committee, which coordinates policy-making between the city government and school district.

Mar voted in support of eliminating the Junior Reserve Officers' Training Corps in San Francisco high schools.

In January 2003, Mar, along with Board of Education members Sara Lipson and Mark Sanchez, backed a resolution that would have created a peace oriented curriculum and established a district-wide anti-war demonstration against the impending 2003 invasion of Iraq. Several board members, including Ackerman, objected to the resolution, claiming that it was partisan and enabled students to skip school. A similar proposal calling for a day of on campus discussion regarding the war in Iraq was later passed.

Mar was criticized by the Richmond Review for allowing local school children to be bussed across the city rather than to attend school in their neighborhoods like Mar's own child.

=== Acrimonious relationship with Arlene Ackerman ===
The San Francisco Chronicle blamed Mar and two other Board of Education members for the tense relationship the Board had with former Superintendent Arlene Ackerman:

What (Ackerman) doesn't need is sniping and second-guessing from elected officials whose job is to set broad policies, not micromanage the superintendent's daily conduct. Tensions between school board members and superintendents come with the territory. But in San Francisco, those tensions had gone far beyond the limits of acceptability. Three board members in particular—Eric Mar, Sarah Lipson and Mark Sanchez—need to start working with Ackerman, not fighting with her virtually on a daily basis.

Beyond Chron, however, had a different opinion, placing blame instead with Ackerman: At a September 2003 meeting of the Board of Education, Mar was among "three board members with whom Ackerman has locked horns said they remain steadfast in their objections to her management of the district, which they characterize as autocratic and unyielding to differing views."

The Examiner and Chronicle were supportive of Arlene Ackerman. Beyond Chron expressed an opposing view: "If Ackerman had any respect for what public votes mean she would have quit after the November 2004 election because that is what the voters were saying when they rejected the candidacies of Heather Hiles, David Weiner and Coach Kane. Instead she stuck around to complain about commissioners city voters chose to re-elect ... [claiming] she represents the "silent majority."

Mar was criticized by members of the African-American community after he gave an interview to a Chinese-language newspaper in which he said Ackerman's attitude toward Asian-Americans should be considered in the Board of Education's yearly evaluation of her performance. Ackerman is an African-American. Cedric Jackson, president of the San Francisco Black Leadership Forum, condemned Mar's actions as "unacceptable, irresponsible, intolerable behavior."

== San Francisco Board of Supervisors ==
=== 2008–2012: First term ===
In 2008, Mar ran for the San Francisco Board of Supervisors for District 1 and won the election, defeating planning commissioner Sue Lee. Mar took office on January 8, 2009.

In June 2008, Mar authored a resolution that requested the state to drop charges against the San Francisco 8. Supporter, including supervisors Ross Mirkarimi, Sophie Maxwell and Chris Daly, contended that previous evidence were acquired via torture and questioned the legitimacy of the new evidence. The police department criticized the resolution and former police chief Tony Ribera urged the supervisors to allow the case to go to trial. The San Francisco Chronicle opined that the legislation conflicted with the judicial process and that any wrongdoing would be revealed in court.

Mar was the chief supporter of a law to ban restaurants from providing toys to customers unless the meals served were nutritious (i.e., reduced sugar, fat and sodium content and included fruits and vegetables). Mar said the measure was intended to be an incentive for restaurants to offer healthier meal choices. The legislation was passed on an 8-3 vote despite then-Mayor Gavin Newsom's disapproval and veto. The Daily Show with Jon Stewart satirized Mar's ban on happy meal toys in a show broadcast on January 1, 2011.

=== 2012–2016: Second term ===
In 2012, Mar ran for reelection. His primary opponent was insurance salesman David Lee. Lee's campaign was notable for being the most expensive in San Francisco history, backed by realtor and business groups. Mar won a second term with 53% of the vote to Lee's 38% (Sherman D'Silva received 7%).

In his second term, Mar focused on transportation issues. In spring 2012, while working with community organizations San Francisco Safety Awareness for Everyone (SF SAFE) and the Bicycle Coalition, Mar put forward a plan to curb rampant bicycle thefts in the city. The plan included more consistent police procedures, additional bicycle parking, and a registration program. Mar also directed the Budget and Legislative Analyst Office to identify potential opportunities to increase funding for bicycle infrastructure. In his last week in office, Mar succeeded in passing a plan for bus rapid transit on Geary Boulevard.

In July 2012, Mar introduced new regulations on chain stores to give neighborhoods more say about who can occupy retail space. The proposal expanded the definition of chain stores, or "formula retail", to include international chains and stores that are at least 50% owned by chains. The policy would also increase public notification standards and require applicants to prepare economic impact reports that measure the potential impact on surrounding stores.

Mar was criticized for complaining about Batkid, then-five-year-old leukemia patient Miles Scott, who was sent by the Make-A-Wish Foundation to "rescue" San Francisco. Mar wrote on Instagram: "Waiting for Miles the Batkid and wondering how many 1000s of SF kids living off SNAP/FoodStamps could have been fed from the $$." For his complaint, Townhall.com named Mar the "Jerk of the Week." In the course of what then-Mayor Ed Lee called "Batkid Day," the pint-sized superhero "saved" San Francisco from the Riddler and the Penguin. In a headline, the San Francisco Chronicle declared Eric Mar "the extra villain" of the day.

In 2014, Mar and Scott Wiener led the ballot measure to tax sodas and sweetened beverages at two cents per ounce.

Mar was fined more than $26,000 on November 6, 2017 for state and city ethics violations associated with concert tickets he took from Another Planet Entertainment within months of sponsoring a board resolution to extend the company's permit for its Outside Lands Music and Arts Festival in Golden Gate Park.

== Personal life ==
Mar was married to Sandra Chin, a public school teacher, for 25 years. They have a daughter. The couple divorced in 2012. He is the twin brother of former San Francisco District 4 Supervisor Gordon Mar.

== See also ==
- History of the Chinese Americans in San Francisco
