= Jake McGoldrick =

American politician

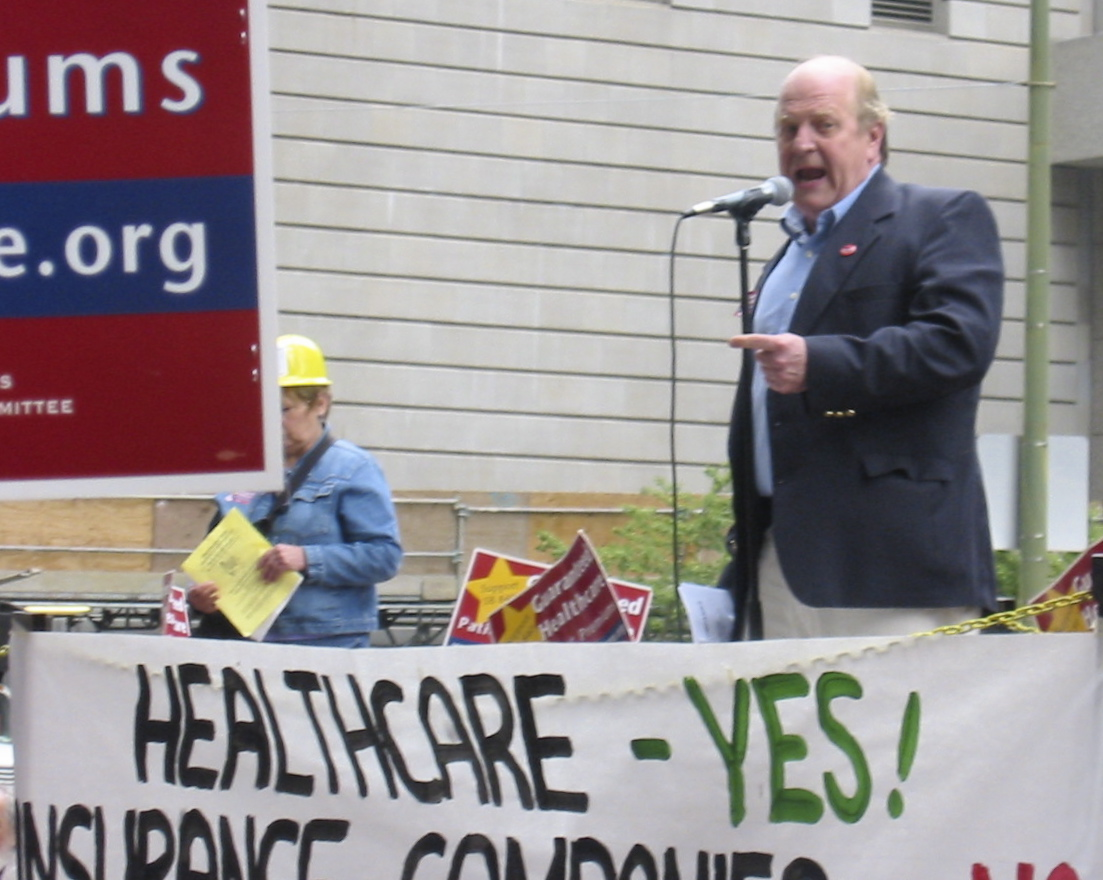
- McGoldrick in 2008

Member of the San Francisco Board of Supervisors from District 1
- In office January 8, 2001 – January 8, 2009
- Preceded by: District Created
- Succeeded by: Eric Mar

Personal details
- Born: Philadelphia, Pennsylvania
- Party: Democratic
- Occupation: Politician
- Profession: ESL teacher

Jake McGoldrick is an English teacher and former member of the San Francisco Board of Supervisors representing District 1, which includes the Richmond District neighborhood McGoldrick was elected in 2000 as part of the progressive majority of candidates that were swept into office that year.

== Early life ==
A native of Philadelphia, McGoldrick lived in San Francisco for more than thirty years, much of that time in the Richmond District.

He graduated with BA in American Studies and MA in English from San Francisco State University. He has taught ESL at University of San Francisco since 1990.

== Career ==
McGoldrick was also a representative for San Francisco County in the Bay Area Air Quality Management District Board of Directors.

McGoldrick was sworn in as the District 1 Supervisor on January 8, 2001. He was re-elected to a second term in November 2004.

In 2007, local businessman David Heller, who had failed in his own run for the Board of Supervisors, announced his intention to collect signatures to recall McGoldrick. Business interests who wanted to recall McGoldrick failed to gather enough signatures to put it on the November ballot – falling about 1,000 signatures short. Proponents of this effort, which include the local Republican Party, tried and again failed to put the recall on the February 2008 ballot.

As supervisor, he was succeeded by San Francisco Board of Education Commissioner Eric Mar.
