= CIF San Francisco Section =

High school athletic organization in California

- Abbreviation: CIF-SFS
- Formation: 1912
- Type: NPO
- Legal status: Association
- Purpose: Athletic
- Headquarters: San Francisco, California
- Location: Athletic Office - Bungalow 2, 555 Portola Drive
- Region served: San Francisco
- Members: 17 schools
- Commissioner: Gail D. Barksdale
- Main organ: California Interscholastic Federation
- Website: www.cifsf.org

The CIF San Francisco Section (CIF-SF), frequently shortened to SFS or just SF, is the governing body of high school sports for school for what was originally the San Francisco Unified School District. It is one of ten sections that comprise the California Interscholastic Federation (CIF). The SFS is also known under the league name Academic Athletic Association, and is the only CIF section not divided into several leagues. While the league currently includes ICA Cristo Rey, Lycee Francais, and Sterne School, most other parochial schools located within the borders of San Francisco; Archbishop Riordan High School, Sacred Heart Cathedral Preparatory and Saint Ignatius College Preparatory (members of the West Catholic Athletic League in the CIF Central Coast Section); and Lick-Wilmerding High School (member of the Bay Counties League West in the CIF North Coast Section). Sacred Heart Cathedral, Saint Ignatius, and Lick-Wilmerding were all previous members of the CIF SF Section before joining their current CIF Sections.

== Schools ==
The league is responsible for athletics between the public high schools in San Francisco, California and has grown in scope to encompass two SFUSD overseen charter schools and three private schools (as well as middle school athletics) within the district:

- The Academy - San Francisco (located at the former J. Eugene McAteer High School campus) known as Academy
- Balboa High School known as Balboa
- Phillip & Sala Burton High School (located at the former Woodrow Wilson High School campus) known as Burton
- Galileo Academy of Science and Technology known as Galileo
- ICA Cristo Rey (all girls private school) known as ICA
- June Jordan School for Equity known as Jordan
- KIPP San Francisco College Preparatory (charter school) known as KIPP
- City Arts and Leadership Academy (charter school) (currently located within the James Denman Middle School campus) known as CAL
- Lincoln High School known as Lincoln
- Lowell High School known as Lowell
- Lycee Francais de San Francisco (private school) known as Lycee Francais
- Thurgood Marshall Academic known as Marshall
- Mission High School known as Mission
- John O'Connell High School of Technology known as O'Connell
- Sterne School known as Sterne
- San Francisco International High School known as SFI
- Raoul Wallenberg Traditional High School known as Wallenberg
- Washington High School known as Washington

== History ==
The league started in 1912 to provide a competitive track and field program between the local schools. The schools at that time were: Lick-Wilmerding High School, Lowell, St. Ignatius College Preparatory, Mission, San Francisco Poly, High School of Commerce, Cogswell Polytechnical College and Humboldt Evening High School
