= Basim Elkarra =

American civil rights leader

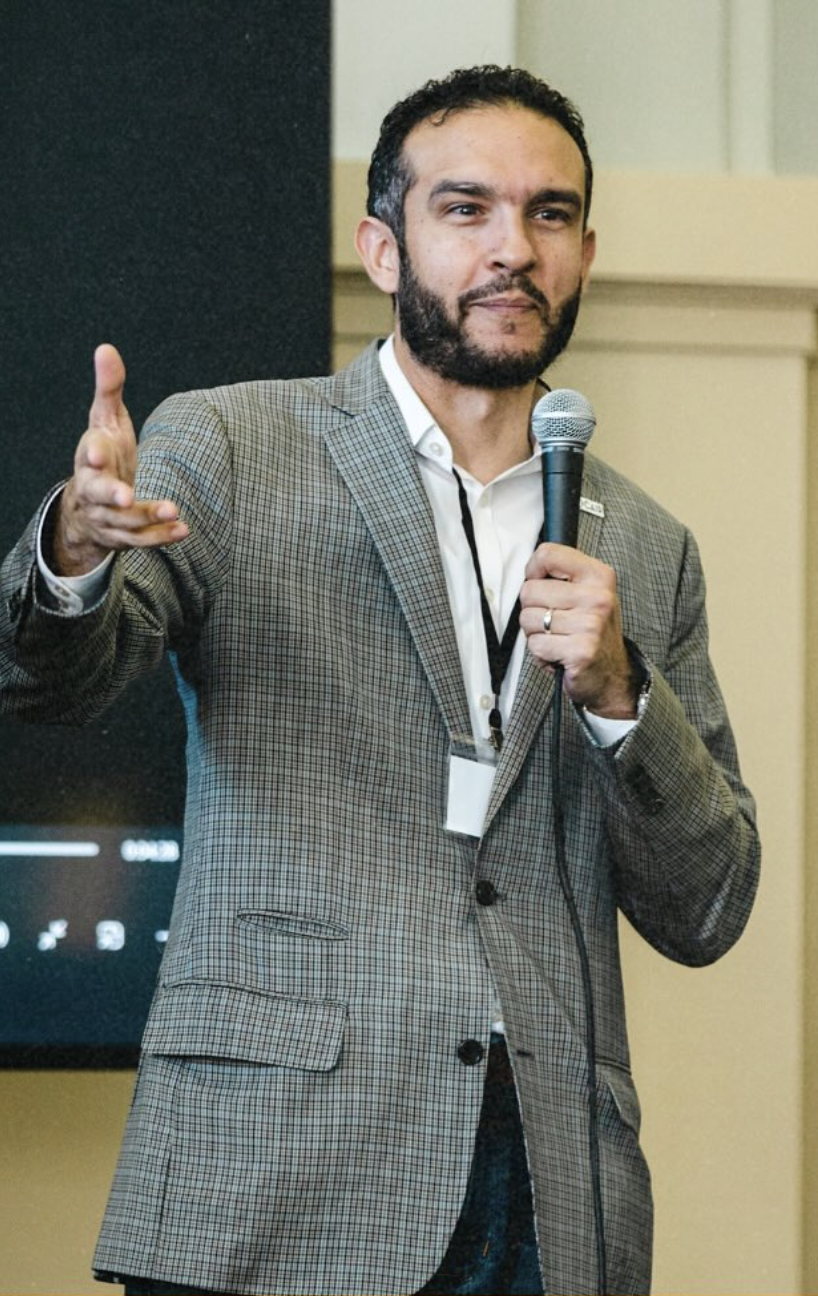
- Elkarra at Be. Bold. Everyday Impact 2025 Conference

California Democratic Party

Personal details
- Born: San Francisco, CA
- Party: California Democratic Party
- Spouse: Married
- Children: Six children
- Education: Academy of Arts & Sciences (San Francisco) San Francisco City College University of California, Berkeley
- Occupation: National Executive Director at CAIR Action; Trustee at Twin Rivers Unified School District
- Profession: Civil Rights Leader, Education Advocate, Elections
- Website: www.elkarra4kids.com

Basim Elkarra (Arabic: باسم القرا) is an American civil rights leader serving as the national executive director of CAIR Action, a 501(c)(4) national advocacy and electoral organization dedicated to building political power for American Muslims and the socially disenfranchised. He is a board trustee of the California Twin Rivers Unified School District and formally the executive director of Sacramento chapter of Council on American-Islamic Relations (CAIR), a board member of Sacramento chapter of American Civil Liberties Union, and served on the executive board of the California Democratic Party.

== Personal life ==
Elkarra was born and raised in San Francisco, CA. He is the second eldest of five children, with two sisters and two brothers. He played basketball at J. Eugene McAteer High School, and attended San Francisco City College and the University of California, Berkeley graduating with High Honors with a B.A. in Political Science. He resides in Sacramento Valley since 2004. He is married and has six children, including a set of twins.

== Education work ==
Elkarra served as the Chair of the Los Rios Community College District's Bond Oversight committee. In this capacity, he oversaw $200 million tax dollars in the modernization and repair of the Los Rios' campuses.

As board trustee of the California Twin Rivers Unified School District Elkarra oversaw the approval of superintendents and negotiations in teacher strikes. He served on the School Site Council at Regency Park Elementary of the North Natomas district of Sacramento, CA.

He's is a speaker on academic freedom and the role faith in social change, hailed by The Sacramento Bee as "Devout and Dynamic." Elkarra is a founder of the Muslim Youth Leadership Program empowering high school students to understand the state legislative process. Designed to have the youth act as senators proposing their own legislations, serving on committees to debate and approve the proposals, and then vote on the proposals on the California State Senate floor. This program has since been organized in other states.

== Civil rights work ==
Elkarra has been the executive director of the Sacramento Valley chapter of the Council on American–Islamic Relations since 2004 to 2024. He has often been interviewed by Sacramento media on the topic of Muslim civil rights. With the City of Sacramento Police Department, he served as Chair of the Police Review Commission and previously was the Community Police Commissioner and member of the Multicultural Advisory Committee. In these capacities, he hosted cultural competency seminars for police officers.

In 2011, the United States Embassy in England sent Elkarra to England to meet young British Muslims as part of an effort to promote civic engagement in England and promoting democracy in the Middle East.

While in his role as executive director, Elkarra represented disfranchised communities of other faiths. Sikhs are often targeted by anti-Muslim hate because some of their men wear turbans, and this is confused as a Muslim garment. Elkarra is a close ally of the Sikh community of Sacramento and he showed up when a Sikh store clerk in Marysville, CA was targeted by a man who said that he "hated muslims," and when the Sikh Temple of Sacramento was vandalized. Dr. Elysse Versher in her capacity as Vice Principal of West Campus High School was targeted by racist message and Elkarra helped to identify the event as a hate crime so that the right attention can be brought to the incident. When the city of council of Fort Bragg raised efforts to change the city name to avoid relation with the confederate General Braxton Bragg, Elkarra voiced support that the country can uplift names of people that tried to tear the country apart and support slavery.

=== Case of Hamid Hayat of Lodi, CA ===
Elkarra, as executive director of the Sacramento Valley chapter of CAIR, was the lead point of contact for the civil rights group in defending Lodi resident Hamid Hayat against his false prosecution. This Lodi case was the first case in the United States where an alleged sleeper cell was arrested and later convicted by trial. The FBI asserted that Hayat was a sleeper cell trained in a Pakistani training camp during his travels there in 2005 with his family. As a first case, it was hailed indirectly by President George W. Bush and Homeland Security Secretary Michael Chertoff, and directly by Attorney General Alberto Gonzales and FBI Director Robert Mueler.

Chertoff argued that the government could not afford to move slowly in prosecuting sleeper cells in the country. Critics claimed that the Bush Administration attempted to exaggerate anti-terror accomplishments only to be slowed down by the legal system. In 2006, the Hayat was the only convicted terrorist (although falsely) living in the country, and this was used to justify and build public support for the U.S. Patriot Act.

After 14 years in prison, the FBI's handling of the case demonstrated a force confession from Hayat and he was exonerated in 2020 by U.S. District Judge Garland E. Burrell Jr. the same judge that presided over his case that placed Hayat in prison. Elkarra spoke alongside Hayat in the press conference following the exoneration.

Elkarrra pointed to how FBI informants were motivated to make false allegations and to entrap subjects. In the case of Hayat, the informant Naseem Khan was previously a grocery store manager and worker at McDonalds in Bend, Oregon. The FBI offered him a $200,000 salary and expenses paid to be an informant for them. This allegedly motivated Khan to find terrorist sleeper cells. In the aftermath and since Elkarra worked with the FBI and as a commissioner at the Sacramento Police Department to lead cultural sensitivity trainings.

== Political work ==
Governor Jerry Brown appointed Elkarra as Committee Member of the 2020 California Census to drive awareness and engagement to increase participation. He served on the Mayor Kevin Johnson transition team and appointed by Mayor Darrell Steinberg to the Police Review Commission.

On March 19, 2024, Sacramento City Council adopted a resolution to call for a cease-fire in Israel's war on Gaza. Elkarra worked with Jewish leaders, the Mayor, and City Council on the wording of the resolution and final passage.

As an executive board member of the California Democratic Party, Elkarra served as chair of the Affirmative Action Committee and chair of the Arab American Caucus. He served as the 7th assembly district delegate.

=== CAIR Action ===
With CAIR Action, Elkarra travels the country to find new political candidates to vet them for endorsement and placement in their voter guide. The group is involved in voter mobilization, education, lobbying, and get-out-the-vote training and operations.

== Legal work ==
Elkarra participated in several legal efforts to halt the Travel Ban by the Trump Administration in Sarsour v. Trump and then Hawaii v. Trump. This was motivated by the rise of hate crimes against Muslims attributed to the ban and restrictions bottlenecking access to medical care in the United States by non-resident aliens. He also filed a suit to challenge the Biden Administration's complicity in the Gaza Genocide in Defense for Children International – Palestine v. Biden.

=== Sarsour v. Trump ===
In January 2017, Elkarra sued President Donald Trump in Virginia in Sarsour v. Trump for the legality of his executive order banning immigration from Muslim majority countries. Other plaintiffs in the case include Linda Sarsour and Rashida Tlaib. The case argued that Trump unconstitutionally targeted countries because their populations are predominantly Muslim and this caused harm to Muslims in America. The Virginia federal judge denied the motion saying that the plaintiffs did not demonstrate credible evidence under the newly revised version of the executive order. As this case was proceeding there were other concurrent federal lawsuits, specifically Hawaii v. Trump and International Refugee Assistance Project v. Trump which successfully secured national injunctions that blocked iterrations of the ban's executive order by the White House.

=== Hawaii v. Trump ===
Elkarra filed a supporting brief in Hawaii v. Trump which eventually gained national injunctions for the Muslim Ban. The State of Hawaii argued through its Attorney General Doug Chin that the Muslim Immigration Ban (Muslim Ban) broke both statutory and constitutional law. While it did not stop the Muslim Ban via a 5-4 decision by the Supreme Court. Later suites challenged renewed versions of the Muslim Ban and was finally overturned by an executive order by President Joe Biden.

=== Defense for Children International - Palestine v. Biden ===
In November 2023 Elkarra sued President Joe Biden, Secretary of State Antony Blinken, and Secretary of Defense Lloyd Austin in Defense for Children International - Palestine v. Biden. The substance of the suit was that the president and his cabinet were complicit in the crimes by Israel on Palestinians in Gaza causing mass casualties and starvation. The complicity is tied to President Biden in allowing the continued and increase of weapons sales and military and intelligence support to the Israeli Defense Forces in theirbombardment of civilians in Gaza. Elkarra along with the other plaintiffs brought forward first hand testimony of the devastating losses of human life in their own families. Elkarra claimed that 200 members of his extended family were killed. The suit was dismissed by a federal judge in Oakland in January 2024 and then by a three-judge panel in the U.S. Court of Appeals saying the courts have to jurisdiction to overrule foreign policy decisions by the president and his cabinet.

== Twin Rivers Unified School District election ==
Elkarra is a board trustee of Twin Rivers Unified School District. In 2015 he ran for the vacant Area 5 seat opposed by Sonja Cameron. This was a special election after the former school trustee Cortez Quinn resigned from seat after a felony plea and Cameron was appointed to the vacant seat. Some local community members alleged that it was unfair to appoint the seat without an election. Signatures were collected and a special election took place on May 12, 2015. The election will cost the school district an estimated $113,000

During this election Elkarra was smeared for his Palestinian roots and Muslim faith in a direct mail flyer of unknown origin. Cameron distanced herself from the flyer stating that with biracial children and grandchildren she would not stand for any slander based on race. Carlos Marquez, political director of the California Charter Association Advocates was Cameron's strongest supporter and said if they learned anyone in Cameron's campaign was behind the flyer, then they would pull out of the election.

== Controversy ==
In 2006, FrontPage Magazine journalist Joe Kaufman, convinced Senator Barbara Boxer to withdraw a "certificate of accomplishment" that she had previously awarded to CAIR official Basim Elkarra. Kaufman cited CAIR's alleged ties to Hamas and extreme statements supposedly perpetrated by Elkarra which he refuted. Boxer “expressed concern” about some past statements and actions by CAIR, and some law enforcement officials asserted that CAIR “gives aid to international terrorist groups.” CAIR nor any of its leaders have ever been indicted nor convicted of any crime. Following these events, Elkarra stated that "It is disappointing that [Sen. Boxer] has succumbed to these extremists." This revocation was strongly criticized by several organizations including the American Civil Liberties Union and the California Council of Churches. CAIR officials denied that CAIR had any links to terrorist groups and that the accusations leveled at them were motivated by Islamophobia. As a result of the controversy Boxer created, Basim received hate mail, including a death threat, since the controversy erupted.

Similarly, in 2010, Ami Bera who was running for a U.S. congress seat, returned $250 of campaign donations to Mr. Elkarra after questions about CAIR's affiliations. Bera was criticized because he "succumbed to the growing national hysteria about Islam in America and the NRCC's fear-mongering, in particular." On April 25, 2015, Ami Bera announced his endorsement for Basim Elkarra's campaign for the Twin Rivers School Board seat.

In 2017, Basim Elkarra received special thanks from the Jewish Federation of the Sacramento Region for getting an apology from Davis Imam Ammar Shahin after the Imam asked god to "destroy those who closed the Al-Aqsa Mosque" in a Friday sermon.
