= Desegregation in the United States =

Ending the separation of two groups

Desegregation is the process of ending the separation of groups, usually referring to races. Desegregation is typically measured by the index of dissimilarity, allowing researchers to determine whether desegregation efforts are having impact on the settlement patterns of various groups. The term is most commonly used in reference to the United States. Desegregation was long a focus of the American civil rights movement, both before and after the US Supreme Court's decision in Brown v. Board of Education, particularly desegregation of the school systems and the military. Racial integration of society was a closely related goal.

== US military ==
=== Early history ===
Starting with King Philip's War in the 17th century, Black and White Americans served together in an integrated environment in the Thirteen Colonies. They continued to fight alongside each other in every American war until the War of 1812. Black people would not fight in integrated units again until the Korean War. Thousands of Black men fought in the new continental navy, on the side of rebellious colonists in the American revolutionary war. Their names, accomplishments and total numbers are unknown due to poor record keeping.

During the American Civil War, Black people enlisted in large numbers. They were mostly enslaved African Americans who had escaped the South, though there were many Northern Black unionists as well. More than 180,000 Black people served with the Union army and navy during the civil war in segregated units, known as the United States Colored Troops, under the command of White officers. They were recorded and are part of the National Park Service's Civil War Soldiers & Sailors System (CWSS). Around 18,000 Black people also joined the Union Navy as sailors, who are also part of the CWSS.

=== World Wars I and II ===
Despite the NAACP lobbying for the commissioning of more Black officers, they were severely underrepresented throughout World War I. Upon entering office, President Woodrow Wilson officially segregated the United States navy for the first time in its history.

During World War II, most officers were White, and the majority of Black troops still served as truck drivers and as stevedores. The Red Ball Express, which was instrumental in facilitating the rapid advance of allied forces across France after D-Day, was operated almost exclusively by African American truck drivers. In the midst of the Battle of the Bulge in late 1944, General Dwight D. Eisenhower was severely short of replacement troops for existing military units, all of which were entirely white in composition. Thus, he made the decision to allow African American soldiers to join White military units in combat for the first time; this represented the first step toward a desegregated United States military. Eisenhower's decision in this case was strongly opposed by his own army chief of staff, Lieutenant General Walter Bedell Smith, who was outraged by the decision, and said that the American public would take offense with the integration of the military units.

For the US Army air corps, see the Tuskegee Airmen.

For the US Army, see the 761st Tank Battalion (United States).

In the Second World War, the US Navy first experimented with integration aboard USCGC Sea Cloud, then later on USS Mason, (both commanded by Carlton Skinner) a ship with Black crew members and commanded by White officers. Some called it "Eleanor's folly" after President Franklin Roosevelt's wife. Mason's purpose had been to allow Black sailors to serve in the full range of billets (positions) rather than being restricted to stewards and mess men, as they were on most ships. The navy was pressured to train Black sailors for billets by Eleanor Roosevelt, who insisted that they be given the jobs for which they had trained.

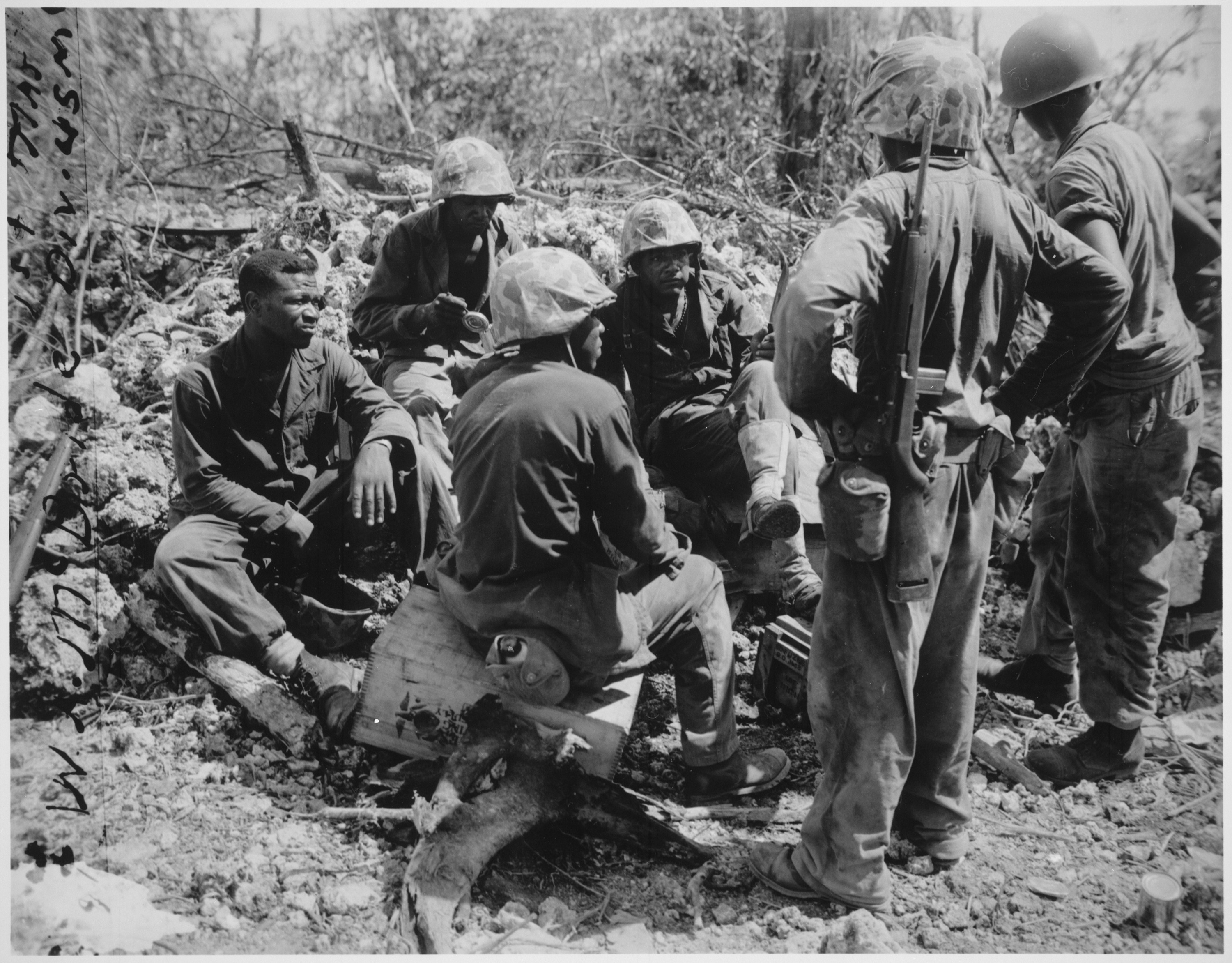
"17th Special" Seabees with the 7th Marines on Peleliu made national news in an official U.S. Navy press release. NARA-532537

The US Navy's newest component, the Seabees, had the same ingrained attitudes and approaches but ended up at the forefront of change. In February 1942, the CNO, Admiral Harold Rainsford Stark, recommended African Americans for ratings in the construction trades. In April, the navy announced it would enlist African Americans in the Seabees. Even so, those men were put into segregated units, the 34th and 80th Naval Construction Battalions (NCBs). Both had White southern officers and Black enlisted. Both battalions experienced problems with this arrangement, which led to the replacement of the officers. In addition, many of the stevedore battalions (special construction battalions) were segregated. However, by war's end, many of those special construction battalions were the first fully integrated units in the US navy. The war's end also brought the decommissioning of every one of those units.

=== Modern history ===
On July 26, 1948, President Harry S. Truman's Executive Order 9981 ordered the integration of the armed forces following World War II, a major advance in civil rights. Using the executive order meant that Truman could bypass Congress. Representatives of the Solid South, all White Democrats, would likely have stonewalled related legislation.

For instance, two months prior to Truman's executive order in May 1948, Richard B. Russell, Democratic senator from Georgia, unsuccessfully attempted to attach a "Freedom of Selection" amendment granting draftees and new inductees the opportunity to choose whether or not they wanted to serve in segregated military units to the Selective Service Act that was being debated in Congress.

At the end of June 1950, the Korean War broke out. The US army had accomplished little desegregation in peacetime and sent the segregated Eighth Army to defend South Korea. Most Black soldiers served in segregated support units in the rear. The remainder served in segregated combat units, most notably the 24th Infantry regiment. The first months of the Korean War were some of the most disastrous in US military history. The North Korean People's Army nearly drove the American-led United Nations forces off the Korean peninsula. Faced with staggering losses in White units, commanders on the ground began accepting Black replacements, thus integrating their units. The practice occurred all over the Korean battle lines, and proved that integrated combat units could perform under fire. The army high command took notice. On 26 July 1951, exactly three years after Truman issued Executive Order 9981, the US army formally announced its plans to desegregate.

On 12 October 1972, a racially fraught riot occurred on USS Kitty Hawk. "Despite the presence of a Black executive officer, the ship's second-in-command, many Black sailors felt they were dealt harsher punishments and menial assignments because of their race".

== US housing ==
The practice of housing segregation and racial discrimination has had a long history in the United States. Until the American civil rights movement in the 1960s, segregated neighborhoods were enforceable by law. The Fair Housing Act ended discrimination in the sale, rental and financing of housing based on race, color, religion, and national origin. This was the first housing law against discrimination. The passage of this act was contentious. It was meant to be a direct follow up to the Civil Rights Act of 1964. However, from 1966 to 1967, it failed to garner enough political support for its passage in the United States Congress. At that time, several states had passed their own fair housing laws and Congress was not convinced that a federal law was necessary.

It was only after the assassination of Martin Luther King Jr. on 4 April 1968 and the ensuing riots that the bill was finally passed. It was signed into law on 11 April 1968 by President Lyndon B. Johnson, a strong proponent. Johnson called the new law one of the "promises of a century … It proclaims that fair housing for all — all human beings who live in this country — is now a part of the American way of life." Since the act's passage in 1968, it has been amended to include sex, familial status, and disability. The Office of Fair Housing and Equal Opportunity within the US Department of Housing and Urban Development is charged with administering and enforcing this law.

== US education system ==
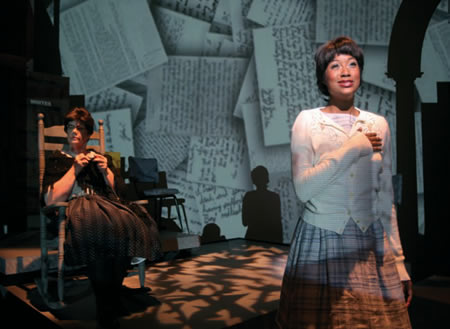
Hate mail written in the late 1950s regarding desegregation of Little Rock Central High School is projected over actresses Mary-Pat Green and Gia McGlone in Arkansas Repertory Theatre's 2007 production of The Legacy Project: It Happened in Little Rock.

After Brown v. Board of Education (1954), the lawful segregation of African American children in schools became a violation of the 14th Amendment. In Swann v. Charlotte-Mecklenburg Board of Education (1971), the Supreme Court ruled unanimously that forced busing of students may be ordered to achieve racial desegregation. However, court-enforced school desegregation efforts have decreased over time.

A major decline in manufacturing in northern cities, with a shift of jobs to suburbs, the South, and overseas, has led to increases in the numbers of residents of all races in suburbs, and shifts in population from the North and Great Plains to the southwest, the Pacific Northwest, and the South. Left behind in many northeastern and midwestern inner cities have been the poorest Black people and other minorities. According to Jonathan Kozol, in the early 21st century, US schools have become as segregated as they were in the late 1960s.

The Civil Rights Project at Harvard University says that desegregation of US public schools peaked in 1988. As of 2005, the proportion of Black students at schools with a White majority was at "a level lower than in any year since 1968".

Some critics of school desegregation have argued that court-enforced desegregation efforts of the 1960s were either unnecessary or self-defeating, ultimately resulting in White flight from cities to suburbs. Middle class and wealthy White people continued moving from cities to suburbs during the 1970s and later, in part to escape certain integrated public school systems, but also as part of the suburbanization caused by movement of jobs to suburbs, continuing state and federal support for expansion of highways, and changes in the economy.

Some White parents in Louisiana said that they were afraid to drop off their children because of all the mobs surrounding the desegregated schools.

Sociologist David Armor states in his 1995 book Forced Justice: School Desegregation and the Law that efforts to change the racial compositions of schools had not contributed substantially to academic achievement by minorities. Carl L. Bankston and Stephen J. Caldas, in their books A Troubled Dream: The Promise and Failure of School Desegregation in Louisiana (2002) and Forced to Fail: The Paradox of School Desegregation (2005), argued that continuing racial inequality in the larger American society had undermined efforts to force schools to desegregate. They maintained that racial inequality had resulted in popular associations between school achievement and race. Therefore, the achievement levels of American schools were generally associated with their class and racial compositions. This meant that even parents without racial prejudice tended to seek middle class or better residential neighborhoods in seeking the best schools for their children. As a result, efforts to impose court-ordered desegregation often led to school districts with too few White students for effective desegregation, as White students increasingly left for majority White suburban districts or for private schools.

=== Asian Americans ===
The increasing diversity of American society has led to more complex issues related to school and ethnic proportion. In the 1994 federal court case Ho v. San Francisco Unified School District, parents of Chinese American schoolchildren alleged that racial quotas under a 1983 consent decree constituted racial discrimination in violation of the United States Constitution's Equal Protection Clause. The desegregation plan did not allow any school to enroll more than 50% of any ethnic group. Originally intended to aid integration of Black students, the ruling had a negative effect on the admissions of Chinese Americans, who had become the district's largest ethnic group.

The newspaper AsianWeek documented the Chinese American parents' challenge. Since Chinese Americans were already nearly half the student population, the consent decree had the effect of requiring the competitive Lowell High School in San Francisco, California, to apply much higher academic admission standards for Chinese American students. However, the civil rights group Chinese for Affirmative Action sided with the school district, arguing that such standards were not harmful to Chinese Americans, and were necessary to avoid the resegregation of schools. In 2006, Chinese parents continued to protest against race-based school assignments.

== See also ==
- Achievement gap in the United States
- Civil rights movement (1896–1954)
- Educational inequality in the United States
- List of sports desegregation firsts
- Military history of African Americans
- Multiculturalism
- Timeline of the civil rights movement
