= Thurgood Marshall High School =

Thurgood Marshall High School may refer to:

- Thurgood Marshall High School (formerly known as Conecuh County Training School) in Evergreen, Alabama
- Thurgood Marshall High School (Maryland)
- Thurgood Marshall High School (Ohio)
- Thurgood Marshall High School (Texas)
- Thurgood Marshall Academic High School, a school in the San Francisco Unified School District
- Thurgood Marshall Academy, Washington, D.C.
- Thurgood Marshall Academy for Learning and Social Change, Harlem, New York
- Thurgood Marshall Secondary School, Pasadena, California
