= TMH =

TMH may refer to:

- Tallahassee Memorial HealthCare, Tallahassee, Florida, US
- Tata Memorial Hospital, Mumbai, India
- TMH Polonia Bytom, ice hockey team in Bytom, Poland
- tmh, the ISO 630 code for the Tuareg languages
- Transmashholding, Russian rolling stock manufacturer
- Tuen Mun Hospital, a hospital in Tuen Mun, Hong Kong
  - Tuen Mun Hospital stop, a nearby MTR Light Rail station

== See also ==
- TMHS (disambiguation)
