= Immaculate Conception Academy (California) =

ICA Cristo Rey Academy
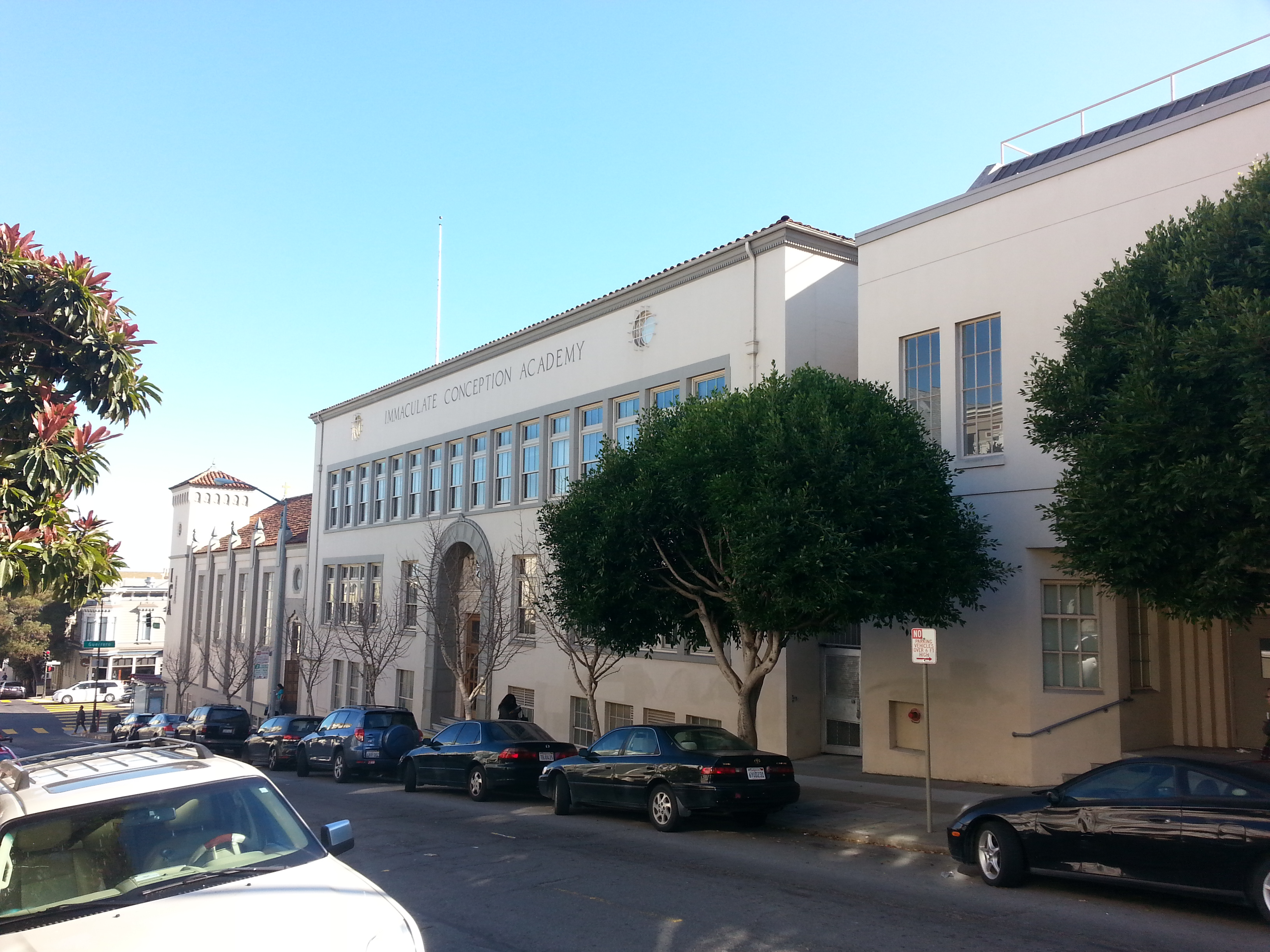

Location
- 3625 24th Street; San Francisco, California 94110; United States; 37°45′6″N 122°25′24″W

Information
- Other name: ICA Cristo Rey Academy
- Type: Private school
- Motto: Latin: Veritas (Truth)
- Religious affiliation: Roman Catholic
- Established: 1883
- Founder: Mother Maria Pia Backes, O.P.
- Oversight: Roman Catholic Archdiocese of San Francisco
- President: Karen Kenkel
- Grades: 9-12
- Gender: Girls
- Colors: Light blue, black, and white
- Song: "ICA Alma Mater"
- Team name: Spartans
- Accreditation: Western Association
- Newspaper: Spartan Press
- Yearbook: Flame
- Tuition: $2,900.00 (2017–2018)
- Affiliation: Cristo Rey Network
- Website: www.icacristorey.org
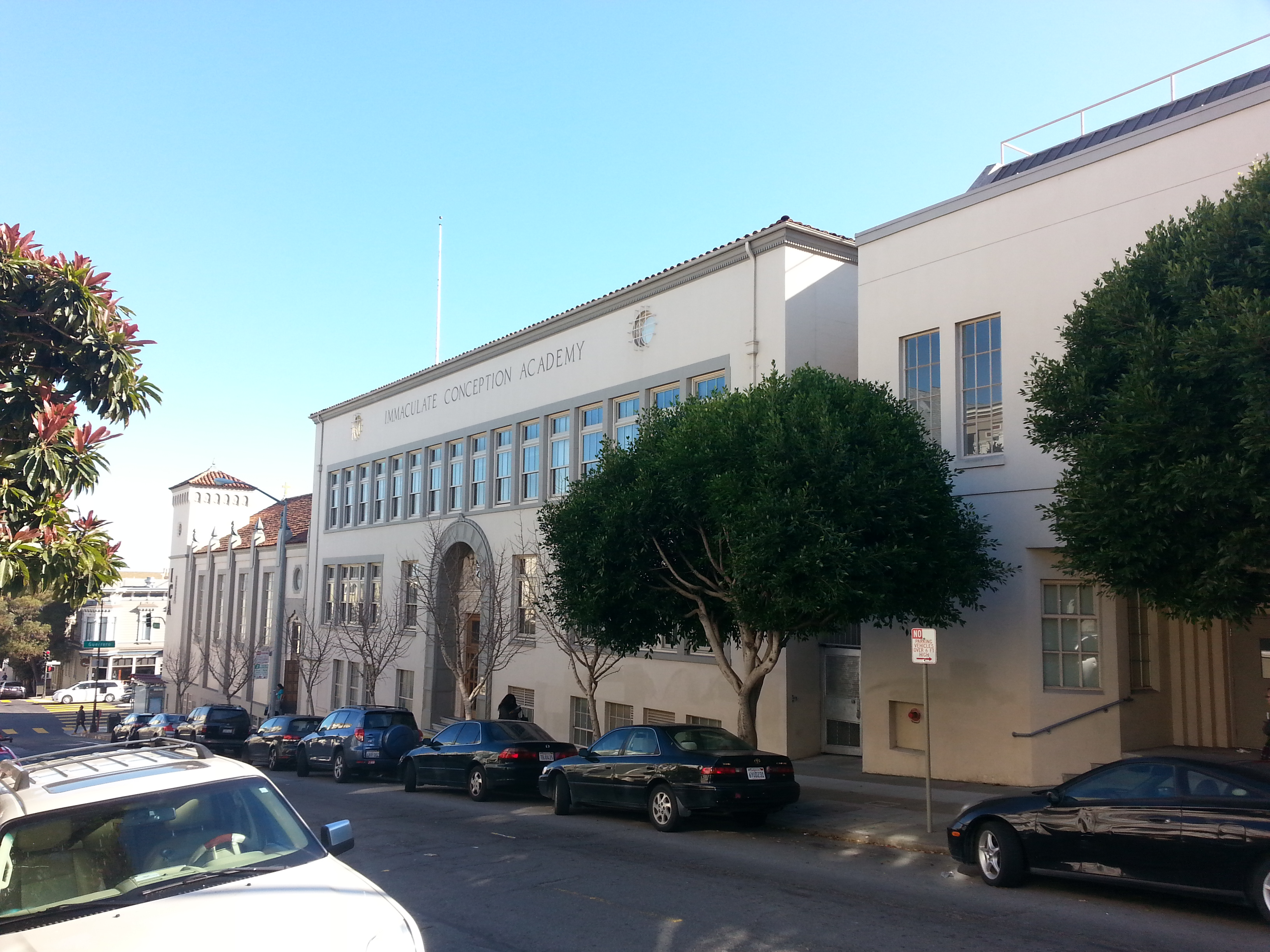

ICA Cristo Rey Academy is a private, all-girls Roman Catholic high school in San Francisco, California, United States that was established in 1883. It is located in the Roman Catholic Archdiocese of San Francisco.

== Background ==
ICA Cristo Rey was established in 1883 by the Dominican Sisters of the Congregation of the Queen of the Holy Rosary of Mission San Jose. The school is located in the heart of San Francisco. ICA Cristo Rey became the first all-girls school in the Cristo Rey Network on August 31, 2009. Since then tuition cost for parents has dropped to about one-third of what it was, with employers paying about $30,000 a year to the school for one entry-level job. The work is performed by four students at each job site, one student from each of the four years. Each year has a day off to work one day a week and an additional day once a month. Since Immaculate Conception is now a Cristo Rey School, it accepts only students who meet the low-family-income criteria. In 2017-2018 the school had 30 sponsors and about 100 work-study partners.

Campus ministry offers service opportunities for the students and each year time off from school for a retreat experience.

Athletics supported by the school include volleyball, basketball, cross-country, soccer, golf, swimming, track & field, and flag football. The school is a member of the San Francisco section of the California Interscholastic Federation and its league Academic Athletic Association.
