= TMHS =

TMHS may refer to:

- Tallinn Music High School, Tallinn, Estonia
- Temple Moor High School, Leeds, West Yorkshire, England
- Tewksbury Memorial High School, Tewksbury, Massachusetts, United States
- The Magic Hockey Skates
- Tomball Memorial High School, Harris County, Texas, United States
- Thunder Mountain High School, Juneau, Alaska, United States
- Thurgood Marshall High School (disambiguation)
- Tussey Mountain Junior/Senior High School, Saxton, Pennsylvania, United States
