= Defense for Children International – Palestine v. Biden =

American lawsuit

- Court: United States District Court for the Northern District of California
- Full case name: Defense for Children International – Palestine; Al-Haq; Ahmed Abu Artema; Mohammed Ahmed Abu Rokbeh; Mohammad Herzallah; A.N.; Laila Elhaddad; Waeil Elbhassi; Basim Elkarra; Dr. Omar El-Najjar v. Joseph R. Biden, Jr., President of the United States, Antony J. Blinken, Secretary of State, Lloyd James Austin III, Secretary of Defense, in their official capacities
- Argued: January 26, 2024 (District); June 10, 2024 (Appeal)
- Started: November 13, 2023; 3 years ago
- Docket nos.: 4:23-cv-05829 (N.D. Cal.); 24-704 (9th Cir.)

Case history
- Appealed to: United States Court of Appeals for the Ninth Circuit
- Subsequent action: dismissal affirmed by Ninth Circuit on July 15, 2024

Outcome
- Dismissed on January 31, 2024; 2 years ago

Court membership
- Judge sitting: Jeffrey White

Defense for Children International – Palestine v. Biden is a US federal court case filed in 2023 against the Biden administration for its alleged "failure to prevent and complicity in the unfolding genocide against Gaza". Representing Defence for Children International – Palestine, Al-Haq, and several Palestinian Americans whose families have been killed, the Center for Constitutional Rights filed the lawsuit in the United States District Court for the Northern District of California against US President Joe Biden, Secretary of Defense Lloyd Austin, and Secretary of State Antony Blinken. The court dismissed the case on January 31, 2024, ruling that while "it is plausible that Israel's conduct amounts to genocide," US foreign policy was a political question, over which courts lacked jurisdiction. The dismissal was upheld on appeal.

== Background ==
The Gaza war has seen high levels of civilian deaths in Gaza.

The plaintiffs stated that, together, over 100 of their family members had been killed in Gaza. Included among the dead are six members of Ahmed Abu Artema's family who were killed, including his 12-year-old son, five members of Dr. Al-Najjar's extended family who were killed, and eight of Mr. Abu Rokbeh's family who were killed. Several individuals and 77 human rights organizations joined the plaintiffs as amici curiae, including Josh Paul from the US State Department; genocide and Holocaust scholars William Schabas, Dr. John Cox, Dr. Victoria Sanford, Dr. Barry Trachtenberg; and Jewish Voice for Peace.

== Outcome ==
On 31 January 2024, the case was dismissed. Judge Jeffrey White ruled that the court lacked jurisdiction over US foreign policy due to the political question doctrine, but that he would have preferred to have issued the injunction and urged President Biden to rethink U.S. policy, writing:

There are rare cases in which the preferred outcome is inaccessible to the Court. This is one of those cases. The Court is bound by precedent and the division of our coordinate branches of government to abstain from exercising jurisdiction in this matter. Yet, as the ICJ has found, it is plausible that Israel's conduct amounts to genocide. This Court implores Defendants to examine the results of their unflagging support of the military siege against the Palestinians in Gaza.

The often cited precedent against jurisdiction of U.S. courts in this case was Corrie v. Caterpillar, Inc (2007).

As reason to not apply the U.S. statutes in regard to the Genocide Convention on the actions of the U.S. government, the court relied on the political question doctrine and cited the reasoning in Corrie v. Caterpillar, Inc: "Whether to grant military or other aid to a foreign nation is a political decision inherently entangled with the conduct of foreign relations."

The dismissal was affirmed on appeal to the United States Court of Appeals for the Ninth Circuit on July 15, 2024.

== See also ==
- South Africa's genocide case against Israel
