= Bill Rojas =

American education administrator

Waldemar "Bill" Rojas is a former superintendent at the San Francisco Unified School District (SFUSD) and the Dallas Independent School District (DISD).

== Early career ==
In 1968 began his education career in the New York City Board of Education (NYCBOE), beginning as a teacher and rising to the chancellor's executive assistant. After becoming head of SFUSD, in 1994 President of the United States Bill Clinton appointed him to the Advisory Commission on Educational Excellence for Hispanic Americans. In 1999 Bess Keller of Education Week described Rojas as "peppery".

== Dallas Independent School District ==
He began his term as DISD superintendent on August 1, 1999. The hiring vote on April 22, 1999, by the DISD board was unanimous. His salary was $260,000, the highest of any U.S. school superintendent.

The relationship with the board deteriorated after he publicly criticized two board members at a news conference after it rejected his proposal to have Edison Schools operate schools. The board called a special meeting on whether to fire him, and Rojas chose to go on vacation to see his family, publicly defending himself and stating he would not resign. He was fired effective July 5, 2000. The vote to remove him was seven to one. He announced plans to file a lawsuit accusing two board members of defaming him, but received a settlement of $135,000, after the DISD board agreed to do so in 2002. This is on top of a $90,000 severance package.

Rojas maintained that he had a positive impact on the district during his tenure.

== Post-DISD ==
After his DISD tenure he became the vice president of Advantage Schools. Circa 2012 he resided in the state of Florida.
