= Arlene Ackerman =

American educator (1947–2013)

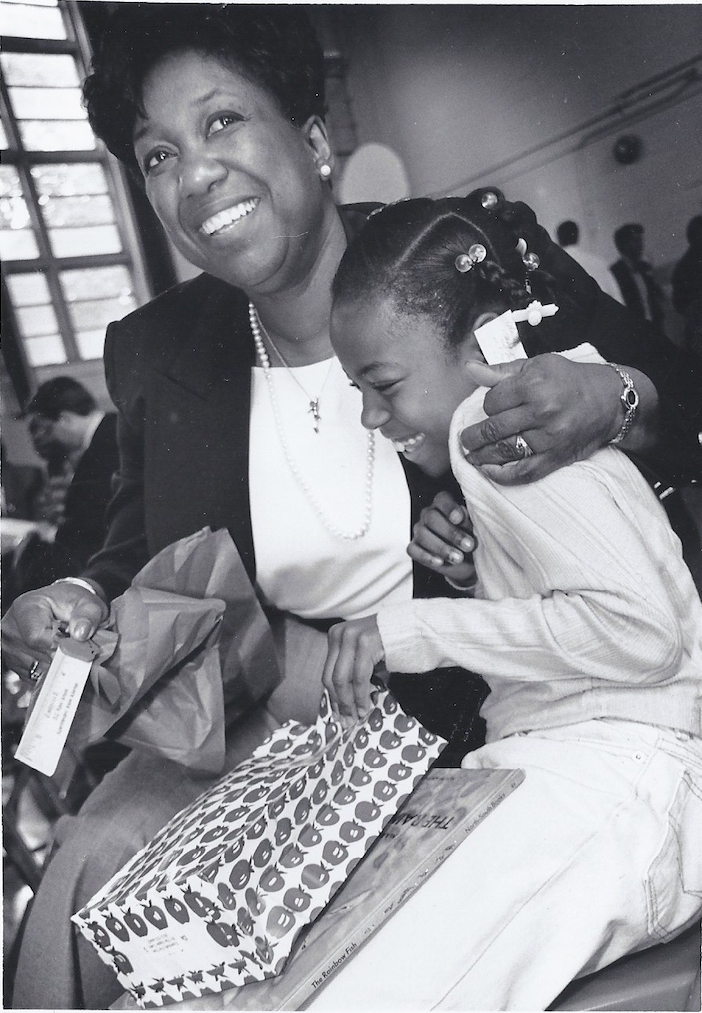

CEO of School District of Philadelphia
- In office May 2008 – November 2011
- Preceded by: Thomas Brady interim

Superintendent of San Francisco Unified School District
- In office 2000–2005

Superintendent of District of Columbia Public Schools
- In office 1998–2000
- Preceded by: Julius W. Becton Jr.
- Succeeded by: Paul L. Vance

Personal details
- Born: Arlene Randle; January 10, 1947 St. Louis, Missouri, U.S.
- Died: February 2, 2013 (aged 66) Albuquerque, New Mexico, U.S.
- Education: Harris–Stowe State University; Washington University in St. Louis; Harvard University
- Occupation: Educator

Arlene C. Ackerman (January 10, 1947 – February 2, 2013) was an American educator who served as superintendent of the District of Columbia Public Schools, San Francisco Unified School District, and Philadelphia Public Schools.

== Early life and education ==
Ackerman was born Arlene Randle in St. Louis, Missouri, on January 10, 1947. She received her doctorate in Administration, Planning, & Social Policy from the Harvard Graduate School of Education, Urban Superintendents Program. She held a Master of Arts in education from Harvard University, a Master of Arts in Educational Administration and Policy from Washington University in St. Louis, and a Bachelor of Arts in Elementary Education from Harris Stowe Teacher's College in St. Louis. She received an honorary degree from Trinity College in May 2000.

== Career ==
Ackerman's had experience as a classroom teacher at both the elementary and middle school levels; principal at the middle school level; Director, Upward Bound Program for first-generation college-bound students; Director, Basic Skills Academy for at-risk high school youth; Assistant Superintendent, Special Services; Assistant Superintendent for Curriculum, Instruction and Academic Achievement; and Deputy Superintendent/Chief Academic Officer.

=== Washington, D.C. ===
In August 1997, D.C. schools chief executive James W. Becton, Jr. appointed Ackerman as his deputy and chief academic officer. At the time, the federal District of Columbia Financial Control Board oversaw finances and government decisions in the District. She became superintendent of the D.C. public schools from May 1998 until July 17, 2000.

=== San Francisco ===
Ackerman was the superintendent of the San Francisco Unified School District from August 1, 2000, to June 30, 2006. She was the district's first female superintendent.

During her tenure in San Francisco, the district was nominated as one of the five finalists for the 2005 Broad Prize for Urban Education, given annually to the best urban school district in the country. The city's public schools with, 62,000 students and 117 schools, attained five consecutive years of improved achievement for all groups of students while also holding the distinction as the highest performing large urban school district in the state of California during the last two years of her superintendence. However, African American students' standardized test scores still lagged behind their peers.

Ackerman's accomplishments include implementing equity measures in San Francisco's schools, including extra support for low-performing schools; the "weighted student formula," in which funding followed each student in different amounts depending on the student's needs; and "site-based budgeting," which gave schools (as opposed to district bureaucrats) far more control over their own budgets. After the implementing the program, 86% of the district's underperforming schools made continued progress, with all student groups demonstrating improved results and scoring above the state and national averages in reading and in math.

Her critics claimed that Ackerman had opposed efforts by the city's Youth Commission to address sexual assaults in the public schools and that Ackerman ordered staffers to not talk to the press. Due to her efforts to maintain fiscal discipline in an era of tight finances, Ackerman's relations with the teachers' union, United Educators of San Francisco, became strained.

The Board unanimously invoked the "compatibility clause" in Ackerman's contract in September 2005, mutually agreeing to Ackerman's resignation within the next year. Commissioner Daniel P. Kelly, an ally of Ackerman's, said that she was "being forced out" due to the "intolerable" infighting. Her opponents, Sarah Lipson and Eric Mar, expressed relief over her resignation.

In May 2007, she sued the district, asserting that they had not paid the over $170,000 of her agreed-on severance compensation. She dropped the suit the following month.

=== New York ===
Ackerman joined Teachers College, Columbia University, where she served as Director of the Urban Education Leaders Program and Chairperson of the Superintendents and Scholars Symposium. The Urban Leaders Education Program is the college's largest doctoral program for public-school leaders. She joined Teachers College's Education Leadership faculty as the Christian A. Johnson Professor of Outstanding Educational Practice in 2006.

=== Philadelphia ===
Ackerman joined Philadelphia public schools as superintendent in 2008. Ackerman developed Imagine 2014, her five-year plan for school reform and strategy to secure more resources to needy schools. Under her leadership, half of all Philadelphia school children met standards on state exams, a first for the district since federal No Child Left Behind Act of 2001 had been enacted. Ackerman's claim to have overseen an improvement in Philadelphia students' performance on standardized tests was challenged by the emergence of evidence that students' scores were inflated by widespread teacher-assisted cheating.

Arlene Ackerman resigned in 2011. Rampant school violence, dictatorial policy decisions with no teacher involvement, indifference towards violence against Asian students at South Philadelphia High School and other Philadelphia schools, unethical bidding for multimillion-dollar contracts, the largest school deficit in district history, and recent allegations of test score manipulation. After three years, she reached an agreement with the Philadelphia School Reform Commission to resign her post in return for $905,000 plus $86,000 in unused vacation pay. In November 2011, she caused surprise by filing for unemployment compensation.

== Awards and recognitions ==
Ackerman received numerous honors and awards including Apple for the Teacher Award-Iota Lambda Sorority, Distinguished Alumni Award-Harris Stowe Teachers College, and recognition from Harvard University's Urban Superintendents Program. Ackerman served on The President's Board of Advisors on Historically Black Colleges and Universities which advises the President and the Secretary of Education on strengthening these institutions. In 2004 she was named 'Superintendent of the Year' by the National Association of Black School Educators. In 2010, she received the Richard R. Green Award for Urban Superintendent of the Year from the Council of Great City Schools in recognition of her contributions to urban schools and students. As the winner of the Richard R. Green Award, Ackerman received a $10,000 college scholarship to give to a student. Ackerman selected Emilio Garcia, a 2011 graduate of the district, to receive the scholarship. In 2011 she received the Effie Jones Humanitarian Award which honors leadership in educational equity and excellence.

She held the Christian A. Johnson Endowed Chair in Outstanding Educational Practice at Teachers College, Columbia University.

Ackerman and her team earned praise from President Barack Obama and United States Secretary of Education Arne Duncan for an intervention approach aimed at turning around the District of Columbia's struggling schools under the Empowerment, Renaissance and Promise Academy initiatives.

== Personal life and death ==
Ackerman was married and divorced twice. She died in Albuquerque, New Mexico on Feb 2, 2013 from pancreatic cancer.
