= Ida B. Wells Continuation High School =

Ida B. Wells High School
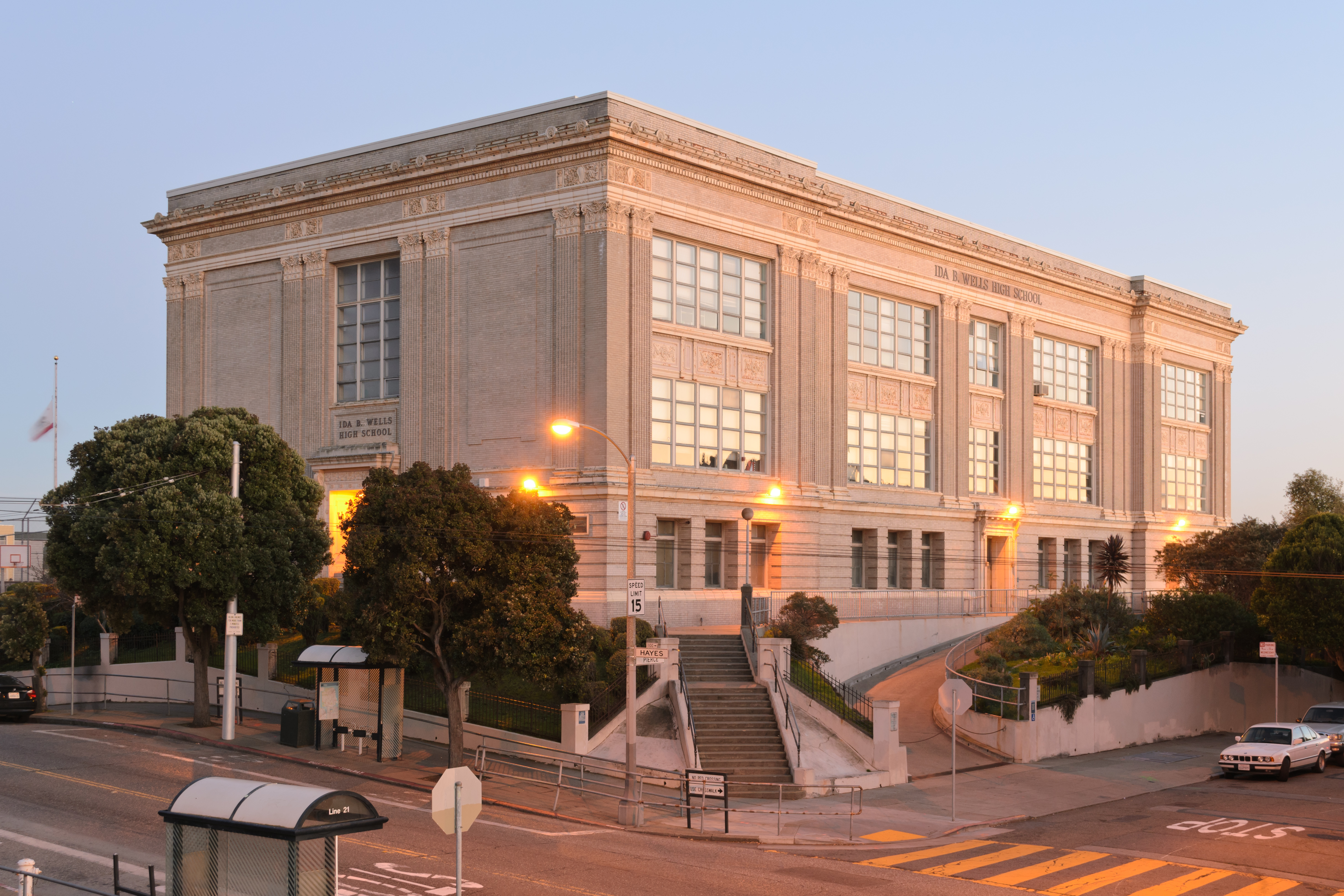

Location
- 1099 Hayes Street; San Francisco, California; 94117; United States of America; 37.7751°N 122.4340°W

Information
- Type: Continuation high school
- Established: September 10, 1911
- School district: San Francisco Unified School District
- Principal: Katie Pringle
- Teaching staff: 12.06 (FTE)
- Grades: 9-12
- Enrollment: 179 (2023–2024)
- Student to teacher ratio: 14.84
- Website: Ida B Wells Website

Ida B. Wells Continuation High School is a public high school in San Francisco, California, located on Alamo Square near the Hayes Valley neighborhood. The school belongs to the San Francisco Unified School District, where it is one of two continuation high schools.

== History ==
The school was built in 1910 in classical style to a design by Newton Tharp. Originally the Denman Grammar School, it had its official dedication on September 10, 1911. It was later Louise Lombard School For the Handicapped and Alamo Park Continuation High School and was renamed in 1992 in honor of Ida B. Wells.

The building was closed for renovations in December 2014 and the students relocated to the John O'Connell High School campus until 2016, when the school reopened. It was previously the oldest continuously operating school in the district.

== Academics and resources ==
The school has a no-homework policy. Students see a counselor every morning and have access to a resource center with a job board. The graduation rate rose to 67% in 2021–22.

The school has a culinary arts program, Heat of the Kitchen. A previous principal approached the instructor, Alice Cravens, to bring the program into the school.

== Athletics ==
The school does not offer any sports, but students are able to and encouraged to participate in a team sport at another school in the district.

== Statistics ==
=== Demographics ===
2016-17

| White | Latino | Asian | African American | Pacific Islander | American Indian | Two or More Races | Not Reported |
|---|---|---|---|---|---|---|---|
| 7.5% | 37.9% | 6.8% | 32.3% | 2.5% | 2.5% | 1.9% | 8.7% |

Enrollment by Subgroup 2016-17

| English Learners | Foster Youth | Homeless | Students with Disabilities | Socioeconomically Disadvantaged |
|---|---|---|---|---|
| 15.5% | 6.8% | 11.8% | 22.4% | 82.6% |
