= June Jordan School for Equity =

Coordinates: 37.7194°N 122.4249°W

June Jordan School For Equity
- San Francisco, California; United States

Information
- Type: Public
- Established: 2003
- Principal: Amanda Chui
- Grades: 9–12
- Enrollment: 250
- Campus: Urban
- Colors: Blue and Silver
- Mascot: Jaguars
- Website: https://www.sfusd.edu/school/june-jordan-school-equity

June Jordan School for Equity is a small public high school located in the Excelsior District of San Francisco, California. The school is named after writer and activist June Jordan, whom Alice Walker called "the universal poet."

June Jordan School for Equity is a part of a nationwide small schools movement, with its parents and staff organized soon after the school was formed to work in helping SFUSD pass a district-wide Small Schools Policy.

== Mission ==
JJSE’s mission is committed to serving working class youth from communities of color and empowering them to be agents of positive change. The school is focused on three key areas:

Social Justice: We stand against oppression, both internal and external. We see ourselves as part of the past, present and future movements for justice in our communities and our world.

Community: We live in Respect, Integrity, Courage and Humility.

Independent Thinkers: We develop ourselves as intellectuals with the skills we need to succeed.

== History ==
June Jordan School for Equity was founded in 2003 by Small Schools for Equity (SSE), a non-profit organization formed by a group of teachers, parents, and students who believed that San Francisco needed a new and innovative model of schooling.

For two years before the school opened, the school’s founders studied successful urban schools across the country and worked with the San Francisco Organizing Project to cultivate a broad-based community organizing effort, through which the San Francisco Unified School District agreed to put forth a request for proposals for new and redesigned schools. SSE applied in partnership with San Francisco State University’s College of Education and was selected from among 30 applicants to open the new school.

In August 2003, the new school opened with a ninth grade class at a temporary location on the campus of San Francisco State University, as the first high school to enjoy a formal partnership with a California State University. A year later, June Jordan School for Equity (a name chosen by the student body during the school’s first year) moves to its current location at the former Luther Burbank Middle School campus in the Excelsior District.

In November 2005, facing severe budget cuts, SFUSD places JJSE on a list of schools that may be closed due to low enrollment, despite the fact that it is a small school by design. JJSE parents work with SFOP to support an event at Mission High School where over 1,300 people hear Mayor Gavin Newsom and school board members pledge to take JJSE off the closure list and work to pass a small schools policy.

In June 2007, JJSE graduated its first class; 73% of graduates are admitted to four-year universities, compared to less than 50% nationwide.

In October 2024, JJSE was included in a list of 13 schools that meet the San Francisco Unified School District's criteria for closing or merging. JJSE is proposed to merge with John O'Connell High School and its students to join O'Connell High School students on their campus.

== Demographics ==
JJSE’s student body of about 250 students lives primarily in San Francisco’s southeast neighborhoods, where young people confront powerful socio-economic obstacles to academic success. These neighborhoods—the Excelsior, Visitacion Valley, Bayview/Hunters Point, and the Mission—are all working-class and low-income, with some of the highest concentrations of families with children in the city. At the same time, many of these communities are experiencing rapid gentrification, which is forcing long-time residents to leave the city and undermining community-based efforts to stem rising crime and violence.

Student Diversity

June Jordan School For Equity

- Minority Enrollment - 99.5%
- Hispanic/Latino - 71.1%
- Black or African American - 11.9%
- Asian or Asian Pacific Islander - 8.5%
- Two or More Races - 6.5%
- White - 0.5%

Data is based on the 2022-2023, 2021-2022 and 2020-2021 academic years.

All SFUSD Schools

- Asian or Asian Pacific Islander - 37.7%
- Hispanic/Latino - 29.6%
- White - 13.8%
- Black or African American - 6.2%
- Native Hawaiian or Other Pacific Islander - 0.8%
- American Indian or Alaska Native - 0.2%

Data is based on the 2019-2020 and 2020-2021 academic years.

== School design ==
In order to meet the needs of low-skilled, marginalized students, JJSE has implemented a number of research-based program features as a small, redesigned school, including:

- class size of 25 or less
- core teacher pupil load of 100 or less
- an advisory system, including frequent parent contact
- all students take a-g university entrance requirements
- partnerships with local colleges where students take university courses
- a performance assessment (portfolio) system to create public accountability for student achievement
- democratic decision-making and distributed staff leadership
- significant built-in weekly professional development and staff collaboration time
- a Wellness Center to address mental and physical health needs
- a parent organizing committee to promote parent leadership and community-based accountability

== Pedagogy ==
As a school for social justice serving a largely working-class, Latino and African-American student population, the mission of June Jordan School for Equity is not just to prepare students for college, but also to prepare its graduates to be agents of positive change in the world.

Its pedagogy is expressly designed to help its students understand the forces of marginalization they have experienced growing up, and thus to begin the process of freeing themselves from oppression, including especially the internalized oppression (or self-imposed limits) which prevent so many students from meeting their potential.

JJSE is in the process of clearly defining its pedagogy in order to support JJSE teachers on their path to becoming masters at the art of teaching for social justice, which in turn will provide all JJSE students the opportunity to develop the self-confidence and self-discipline they need to become not just authentic intellectuals, but also leaders who will work on behalf of their communities and create a more just and humane world.
