= Ho v. San Francisco Unified School District =

1994 class action lawsuit

- Supreme Court of California

Argued April 15, 1998 Decided June 4, 1998
- Full case name: Brian Ho, by his parent and next friend, Carl Ho; Patrick Wong, by his parent and next friend, Charlene Wong; Hilary Chen, by her parent and next friend, jane chen, plaintiffs-appellants, v. san francisco unified school district; san francisco board of education; Waldemar Rojas, superintendent of the San Francisco Unified School District; Board of Education of the State of California; California Department of Education; William d. Dawson; San Francisco National Association for the Advancement of Colored People, defendants-appellees. Brian Ho, by his parent and next friend, Carl Ho, petitioner, v. United States District court for the northern district of california, respondent, san francisco unified school district, real party in interest.
- Citation(s): 147 F.3d 854, 98 Cal. Daily Op. Service 4277, 98 Daily Journal DAR 6066

Holding
- Appeal Dismissed. Petition for mandamus Denied.

Court membership
- Chief Justice: John T. Noonan Jr., Stephen S. Trott, Evan J. Wallach

Case opinions
- Majority: John T. Noonan Jr., Stephen S. Trott
- Dissent: Evan J. Wallach

Ho v. San Francisco Unified School District was a 1994 class action lawsuit by the Asian American Legal Foundation challenging the use of racial quotas after NAACP v. SFUSD limiting the enrollment of Chinese Americans by the San Francisco Unified School District. As a result of the case, San Francisco Unified school district switched to a system using a "diversity index" that excluded race as an alternative to the quota system.

With the resulting consent decree creating a new Diversity Index admissions system, that ultimately resegregated the school district as a result of the Diversity Index created from a settlement in 2001, compared to the previous admissions system created from the 1983 consent decree in NAACP v. SFUSD.

== Case ==
=== Plaintiffs ===
In 1993, three plaintiffs were involved in numerous conflicts with the school system.

Brian Ho, a five-year-old Chinese American, "was turned away from his two neighborhood kindergartens because the schools had accepted the maximum allowed percentage of “Chinese” schoolchildren."

Patrick Wong, fourteen years old, "was rejected because his index score was below the minimum required for Chinese American applicants despite his score was high enough that he would have been admitted to Lowell had he been a member of any other racial or ethnic group recognized in the consent decree.", later getting rejected to four other schools.

Hillary Chen, eight years old, "was not allowed to transfer into any of three elementary schools near her new home because all three schools had accepted the maximum number of Chinese American schoolchildren."

These three plaintiffs would sue the San Francisco Unified School District to remove exclusionary racial quotas in the 1983 Consent Decree barring their entry to the schools in 1994 in violation of the Equal Protection Clause of the 14th Amendment.

In January 1995, the Ho plaintiff filed a first amended complaint adding the NAACP as a defendant.

In March 1996, the Court certified the Ho action as a class action on behalf of all children of Chinese descent of school age who are current residents of San Francisco and who are eligible to attend the public school system.

In May 1997, The Ninth Circuit affirmed this Court's finding that the assignment of students by race subjects the students to race-based classification by a state actor. Such racial classifications are subject to strict scrutiny, and may be used by the government only if necessary to correct the effects of government action of a racist character and the burden of justifying the racial classification fell upon the defendants.

Both parties were not prepared to go to trial on September 22, 1998, and the "Court berated the parties for neglecting the preparation, but vacated the trial date and referred the case to a special master for settlement discussions."

When settlements failed, the Court set a new trial date on February 16, 1999.

On February 16, the day of the trial, the NAACP defendants and Ho plaintiffs requested a delay to finalize a settlement.

At a hearing the following morning, the Court tentatively approved the settlement and fairness hearing for April 20, 1999.

=== Results ===
In the final opinion and order of US United States District Judge William H. Orrick, he ordered that the district, "Remove racial/ethnic guidelines (40% at alternative schools; 45% at regular schools)" and "Remove Priority 5 in the computer random selection run -- African American, Hispanic/Latino and other students." Disallowing race based or ethnicity as a primary consideration in assigning students to schools.

And a court ordered monitor with increased oversight on the Consent Decree, as recommended by Gary Orfield of the Civil Rights Project at UCLA .

The 1983 Consent Decree from the San Francisco v. NAACP settlement will be set to expire by December 31, 2002, resulting in a new Consent Decree with in the Diversity Index admissions system created in 2001.

== Legacy ==
=== Diversity Index (Admissions System) ===
As a result of the case, the diversity index system was the first race-neutral, assignment plan in the school district, using factors such as: mother’s education level, student socioeconomic status, test scores, English proficiency — that would ideally lead to racially and ethnically diverse schools.

The process was designed to give parents choice, ensure equitable access, and promote diversity without using race/ethnicity, and all the race neutral factors were correlated with academic achievement.

The Diversity Index Lottery was limited in its ability to create diverse schools because the applicant pools for individual schools were racially isolated.

Participation in the choice process varied by race/ethnicity — white and Asian families were much more likely than African American and Latino families to submit their choices in January for August enrollment. Leading to those families enrolling by the time the high demand schools would be full. An issue that remains to this day.

In 2010, the Diversity Index was replaced by a full choice system.

=== Order Denying Proposed Extension of Consent Decree ===
In 1970, over 50% of San Francisco schools were segregated, defined as one racial/ethnic group comprising over fifty percent of the school population.

Before the last year of the 1983 consent decree, only one school or 0.6% - enrolled more than 50% of a single racial/ethnic group, six years later, it has climbed to 35%.

During the school year 2001-02, 30 schools were severely resegregated at one or more grade levels, by the 2004-05 school year, it has risen to 43, with 27 schools entirely resegregated.

By 2005, over one in three schools in the district has resegregated.

The consent-decree monitor has made clear his view that the current student-assignment plan, incorporated into the consent decree itself, has resulted in the resegregration of certain schools.

William Alsup finalized his ruling, saying "In short, since the settlement of the Ho litigation, the consent decree has proven to be ineffective, if not counterproductive, in achieving diversity in San Francisco public schools."

The Consent decree extension was denied, expiring December 31, 2005, for the first time in 22 years, the courts did not oversee SFUSD’s student assignment process.
