= Thurgood Marshall Academic High School =

Location
- 45 Conkling Street; San Francisco, California 94124

Information
- School type: Public
- Opened: 1994
- Principal: Sarah Ballard-Hanson
- Grades: 9-12
- Enrollment: 457 (2024-25)
- Website: www.sfusd.edu/school/thurgood-marshall-academic-high-school

Thurgood Marshall Academic High School ( TMAHS; colloquially Marshall High School) is a public college-preparatory high school in San Francisco, California, United States. It is part of the San Francisco Unified School District. The school is located in the Silver Terrace neighborhood in the southeastern part of the city, located next to a middle school.

== History ==
The building was originally opened in 1958 as Pelton Middle School. In 1994, the middle school was closed and the school was opened. The name comes from Thurgood Marshall, the first African-American justice for the Supreme Court.

A modernization project following a bond in 2020 renovated the cafeteria, main office, classrooms, and kitchen.

== Demographics ==
TMAHS has an extremely high minority enrollment, the highest in the San Francisco Unified School District. As of the 2024-25 school year, 99.3% of students are a racial minority. 77.7% of students are Hispanic/Latino, 10.5% are Asian, 8.1% of students are Black or African-American, and only 0.7% are Caucasian. 66% of students are on California free or reduced lunch.
