= San Francisco Unified School District =

School district in California, United States

Location
- 555 Franklin Street San Francisco, California, 94102 United States United States

District information
- Type: Public
- Grades: Pre K-12
- Established: 1851; 175 years ago
- Superintendent: Maria Su
- Schools: 121 (March 2024)
- Budget: $1.36 billion

Students and staff
- Students: 49,500 (March 2024)
- Staff: 10,000 (August 2023)

Other information
- Website: www.sfusd.edu

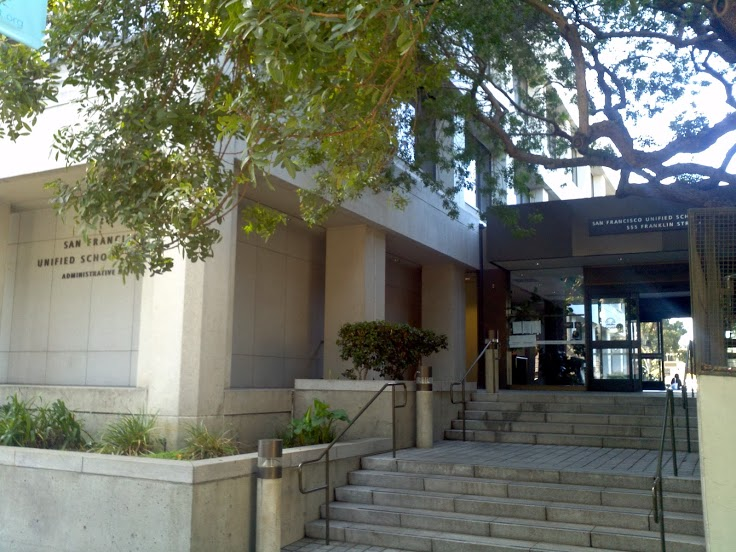
San Francisco Unified School District Administrative Building at 555 Franklin Street

San Francisco Unified School District (SFUSD), established in 1851, is the only public school district within the City and County of San Francisco, and the first in the state of California. Under the management of the San Francisco Board of Education, the district serves approximately 50,046 students across 122 schools.

SFUSD utilizes an intra-district school choice system and requires students and parents to submit a selection application. Every year in the fall, the SFUSD hosts a Public School Enrollment Fair to provide families access to information about all the schools in the district. This system is set to change for elementary school enrollment as the school board has voted to assign elementary school students to their neighborhood school, with some choice for special education and language programs.

== History ==
Arlene Ackerman began her tenure as the superintendent of SFUSD on August 1, 2000. In May 2004, the district received $3.3 million for whistleblowing a company defrauding a federal program meant to provide internet to disadvantaged children. In June 2004, Ackerman announced that Progress Energy Inc would pay SFUSD $43.1 million to settle a case accusing its subsidiary, Strategic Resource Solutions, of defrauding the district in an energy deal.

The David Lynch Foundation sponsored the Quiet Time transcendental meditation program at various SFUSD middle and high schools. Visitacion Valley Middle School was the first school to adopt the program in 2007.

SFUSD dropped Columbus Day from the school calendar in January 2017.

In early March 2020, SFUSD temporarily closed Lowell High School and adjacent Lakeshore Elementary School after some family members of students reported respiratory illness at the beginning of the COVID-19 pandemic in the United States. The district then closed all schools on March 16, for 3 weeks, which was subsequently extended until the end of the school year with distance learning implemented for students. In July 2020, they announced that schools would remain closed into the next school year.

On February 3, 2021, San Francisco City Attorney Dennis Herrera announced that, on February 11, he would sue the San Francisco Board of Education, SFUSD, and Superintendent Vincent Matthews for violating state law by not having a plan to "offer classroom-based instruction whenever possible". The lawsuit was the first of its kind, wherein a civil action is filed by a city against its school district over COVID-19 school closures, within the state of California. The suit is supported by former mayor London Breed, who has criticized the Board for focusing on renaming 44 SFUSD schools during the pandemic. Both the Board and Matthews criticized the suit, calling it wasteful and inaccurate.

On February 15, 2022, three members of the school board were recalled in the 2022 San Francisco Board of Education recall elections.

The district had planned to close some schools by 2025 amid a loss of 10,000 students, but halted those plans and replaced superintendent Matt Wayne in October 2024.

=== 2014 mathematics curriculum reform ===
In an effort to reduce the segregation of socio-economically disadvantaged students into lower-level math classes, the district updated its mathematics curriculum in 2014. The new program removed honors classes and accelerated math, placing all students into the same curriculum based on grade, and delayed the teaching of algebra until the 9th grade. Inspired by the work of Stanford education professor Jo Boaler, classrooms were reorganized with groups of students collaborating to solve a series of math problems. Boaler and several colleagues praised the effort in an op-ed for The Hechinger Report, citing a district announcement that the repeat rate for 9th grade algebra had dropped from 40% to 8%. A school district spokesperson described the change as a "one-time major drop". Opposing the changes, the advocacy group Families for San Francisco argued that the drop could be explained by the removal of placement testing, which occurred at the same time.

A 2023 study by a team of Stanford Education academics found that delaying Algebra I failed to improve ethnoracial gaps in advanced math course-taking. Following years of protest by parents, the school board voted in February 2024 to reinstate Algebra I in public middle schools. In March 2024, 82 percent of San Francisco voters passed Proposition G, a non-binding resolution urging the school board to reverse its previous decision to delay Algebra I. The district superintendent later announced a three-year plan to implement Algebra I across all San Francisco middle schools by 2026–2027.

== Student admissions ==
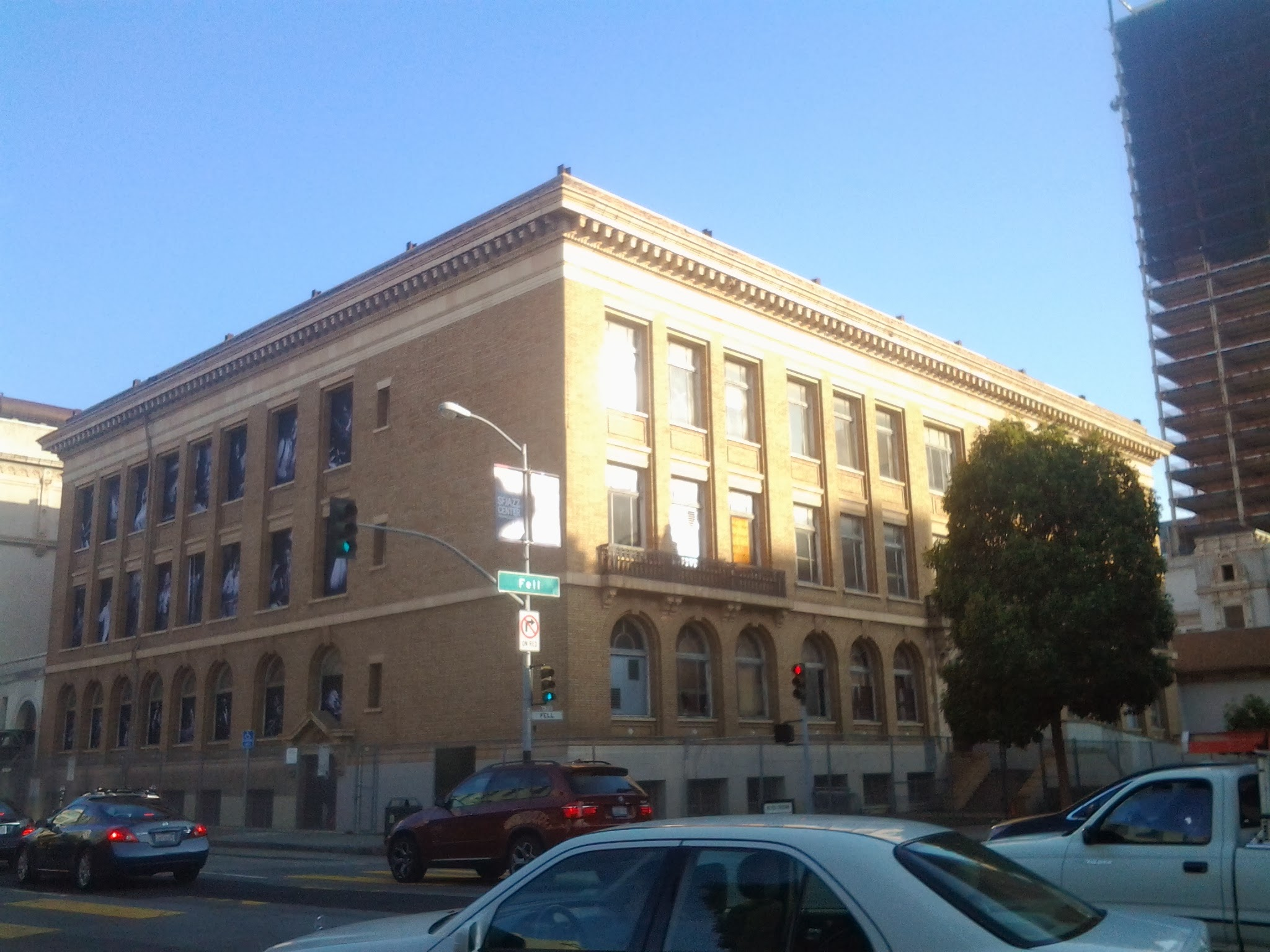
Another San Francisco Unified School District building, from Fell st. & Franklin st. crossing.

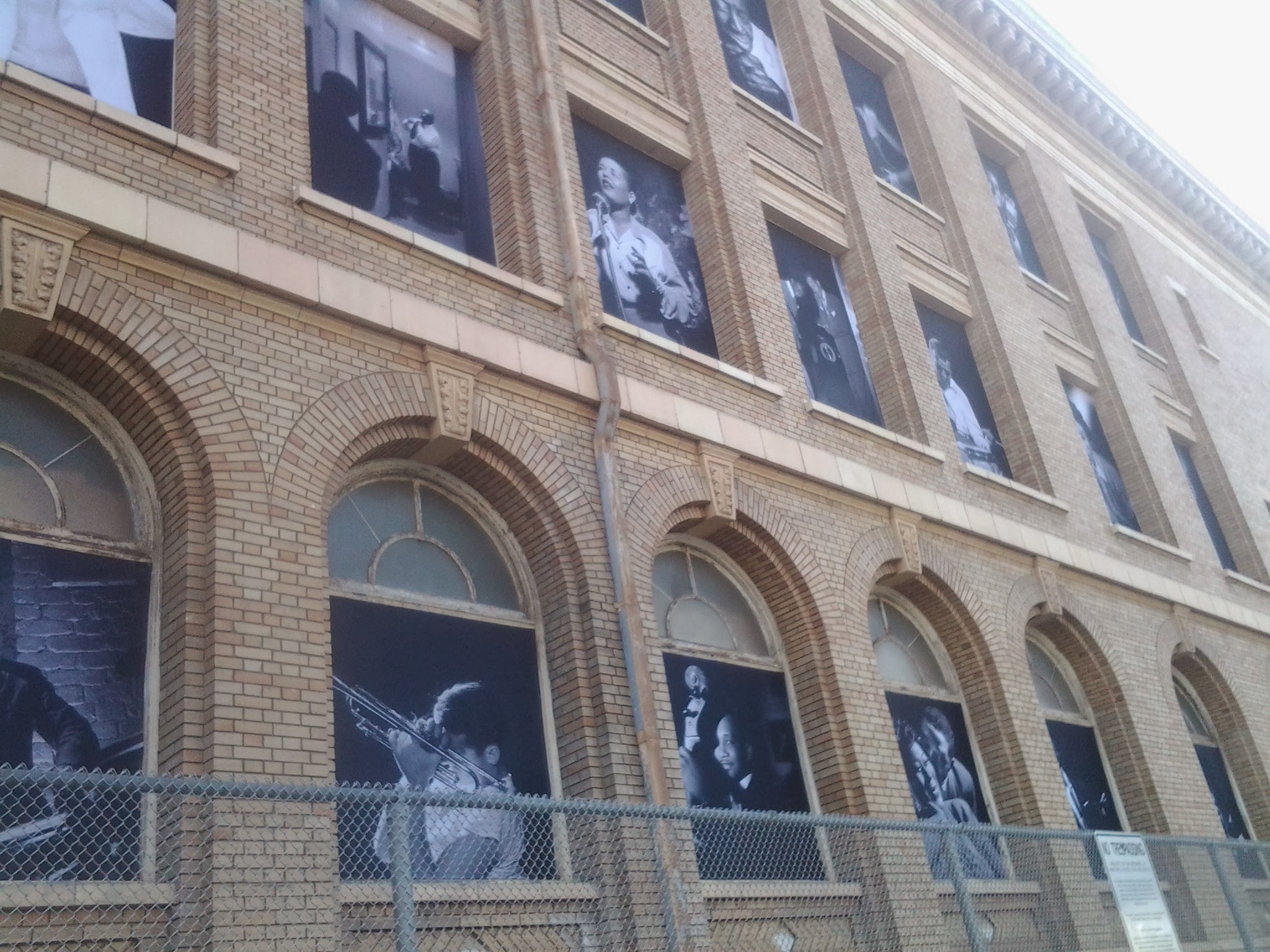
Windows of that San Francisco Unified School District building covered with photos of jazz legends.

SFUSD previously practiced a race-based admissions system, presently operates under a choice assignment system.

=== San Francisco NAACP v. San Francisco Unified School District (1980s) ===
In 1983, the NAACP sued the school district and won a consent decree that mandated that no more than 45% of any racial group may make up the percentage of students at a single school. At the time, white and black students were the largest demographic groups in the school district. The decree was intended to benefit black children. When it was discovered that Hispanic children also had low test scores, they were added to the decree's intended beneficiaries.

=== Ho v. San Francisco Unified School District (1990s) ===
In a five-year period ending in 1999, Asian and Latino students were the largest demographic groups in the SFUSD. In 1994, after several ethnic Chinese students were denied admission to programs because too many ethnic Chinese students were present, ethnic Chinese parents sued SFUSD arguing that the system promoted racial discrimination. On April 15, 1998, the Chinese-American group asked a federal appeals court to end the admissions practice. The system required ethnic Chinese students to receive higher scores than other ethnic groups in order to be admitted to Lowell High School, the city's most prestigious public high school. Waldemar Rojas, the superintendent, wanted to keep the decree because the district had received $37 million in desegregation funds. The NAACP had defended the decree. White parents who were against the racial quotas had a tendency to leave San Francisco.

In 1998, a federal appeals court ruled that the race-based criteria should not be ended, but that SFUSD is required to justify why it required higher test scores from ethnic Chinese applicants to gain admission to the school district's most prestigious high school and that the school district is required to prove, during a trial held in the 1999–2000 school year, that segregation is remaining in the school system and that the limitation of the ethnic groups at each school is the only possible remedy. On February 16, 1999, lawyers representing the Chinese parents in Ho v. SFUSD revealed that the school district had agreed to a settlement that removed the previous race-based admission system; William Orrick, the U.S. district judge, had planned to officially announce the news of the settlement the following day. The district planned to implement a "diversity index" in which race was one factor, but in December 1999, Orrick rejected the plan as unconstitutional. Orrick ordered the district to resubmit the plan without race as a factor or to resubmit the plan under the settlement that had been reached with the Chinese parents. In January 2000, the district agreed to remove race as a factor of consideration for admission.

=== Expiration of the Consent Decree ===
Critics of the diversity index created by Ho v. San Francisco Unified School District point out that many schools, including Lowell, have become even less racially diverse since it was enacted.

On November 15, 2005, the United States District Court for the Northern District of California denied a request to extend the Consent Decree, which was set to expire on December 31, 2005, after it had been extended once before to December 31, 2002. The ruling claimed "since the settlement of the Ho litigation [resulting in the institution of the "diversity index"], the consent decree has proven to be ineffective, if not counterproductive, in achieving diversity in San Francisco public schools" by making schools more racially segregated.

As of 2007, SFUSD admission factors include race-neutral aspects, such as the socioeconomic status of a student's family. Lyanne Melendez of KGO-TV wrote in 2007 "but the local courts and the district have found that race-neutral factors haven't worked in San Francisco's case."

=== Current Student Assignment System (2011–present) ===
In 2011, SFUSD instituted a full choice assignment system, but "despite the District’s good intentions, San Francisco’s schools are more segregated now under the current policy than they were thirty years ago." then under the OER system implemented after San Francisco NAACP v. San Francisco Unified School District from 1983 to 2000. Citing choice did not increase diversity, but encourage the opposite, as well as the problem of requiring the time to "shop" for schools.

In 2018, the school board voted unanimously to create a new plan to address segregation in the district. The plan seeks to focus on diversity, predictability, and proximity with a zone-based assignment system for Elementary students, and will "also consider the demographic characteristics of each child’s immediate neighborhood when assigning students to help ensure that every school reflects the diversity of the zone it's in." However, the district never implemented this zone-based plan.

=== Elementary Attenance-Area Assignment System (in development; Fall 2028 earliest implementation) ===
In 2026, the school board voted to change Elementary school enrollment to a process which would automatically assign kindergarten students to their local school. Families could apply to schools with special programs, including language immersion, bilingual education, special education and K-8 schools. Implementation of the new process is expected to be in place for Fall 2028.

== Current schools ==
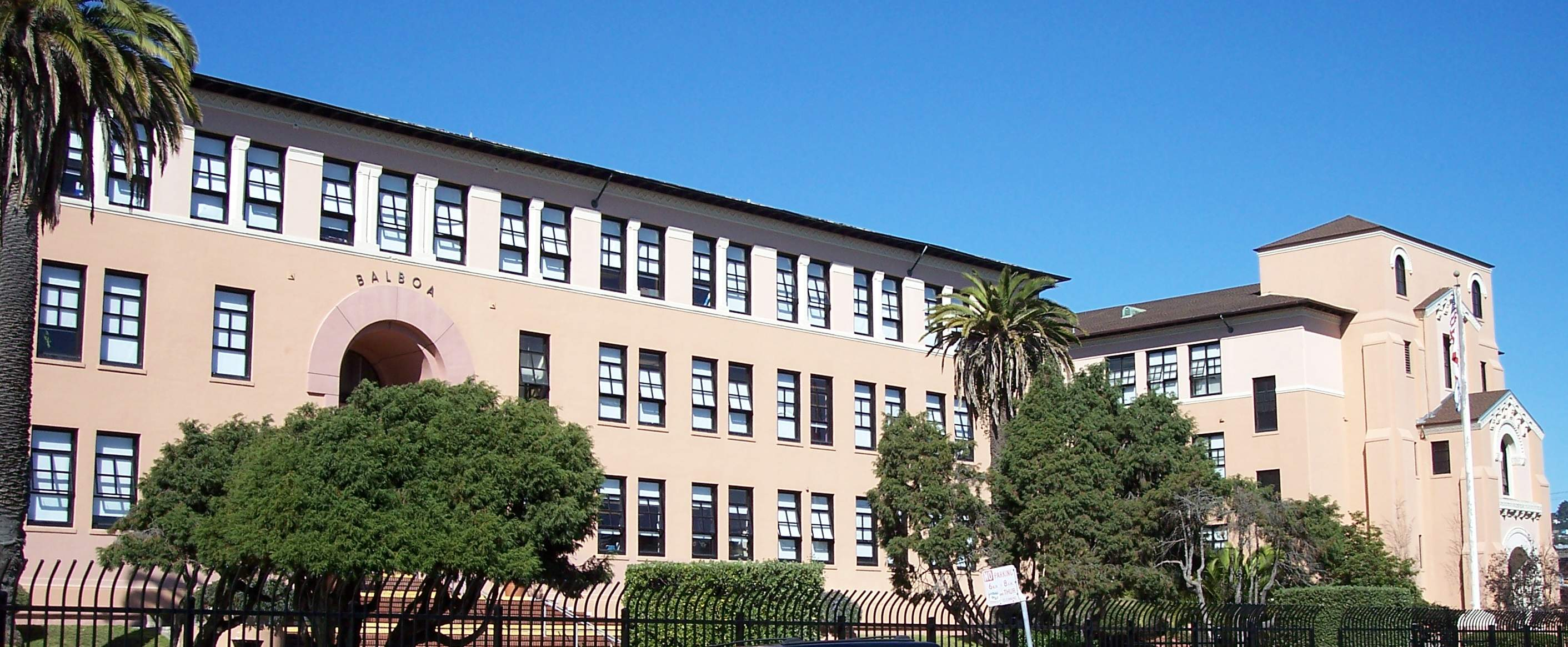
Balboa High School

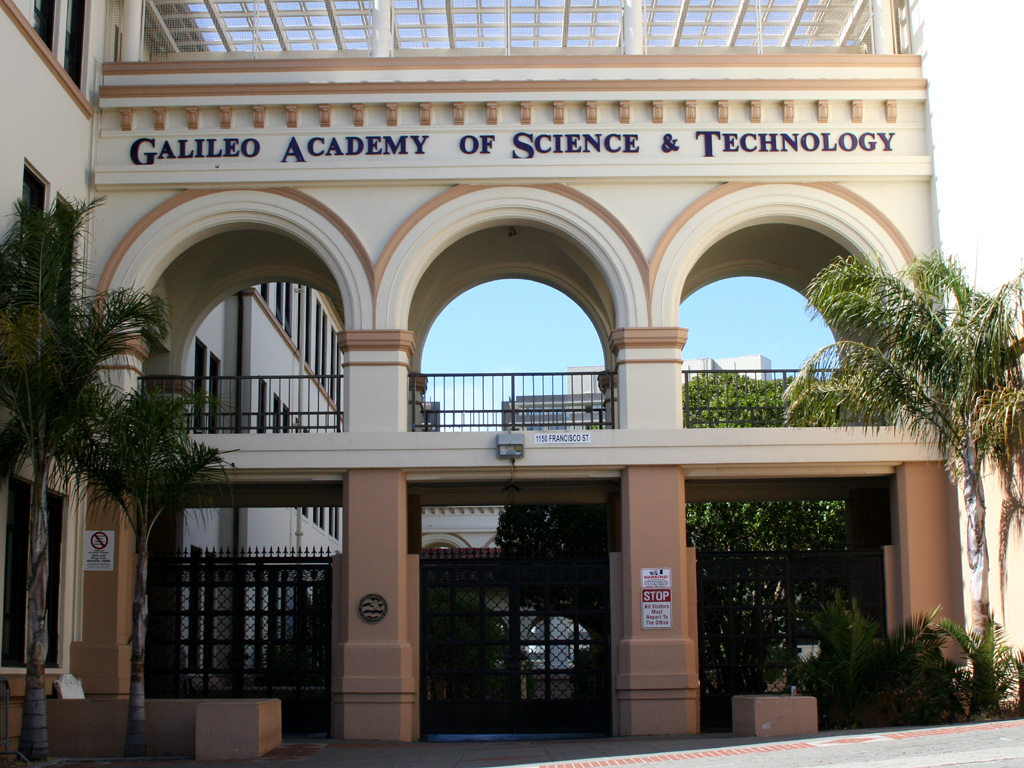
Galileo Academy of Science and Technology

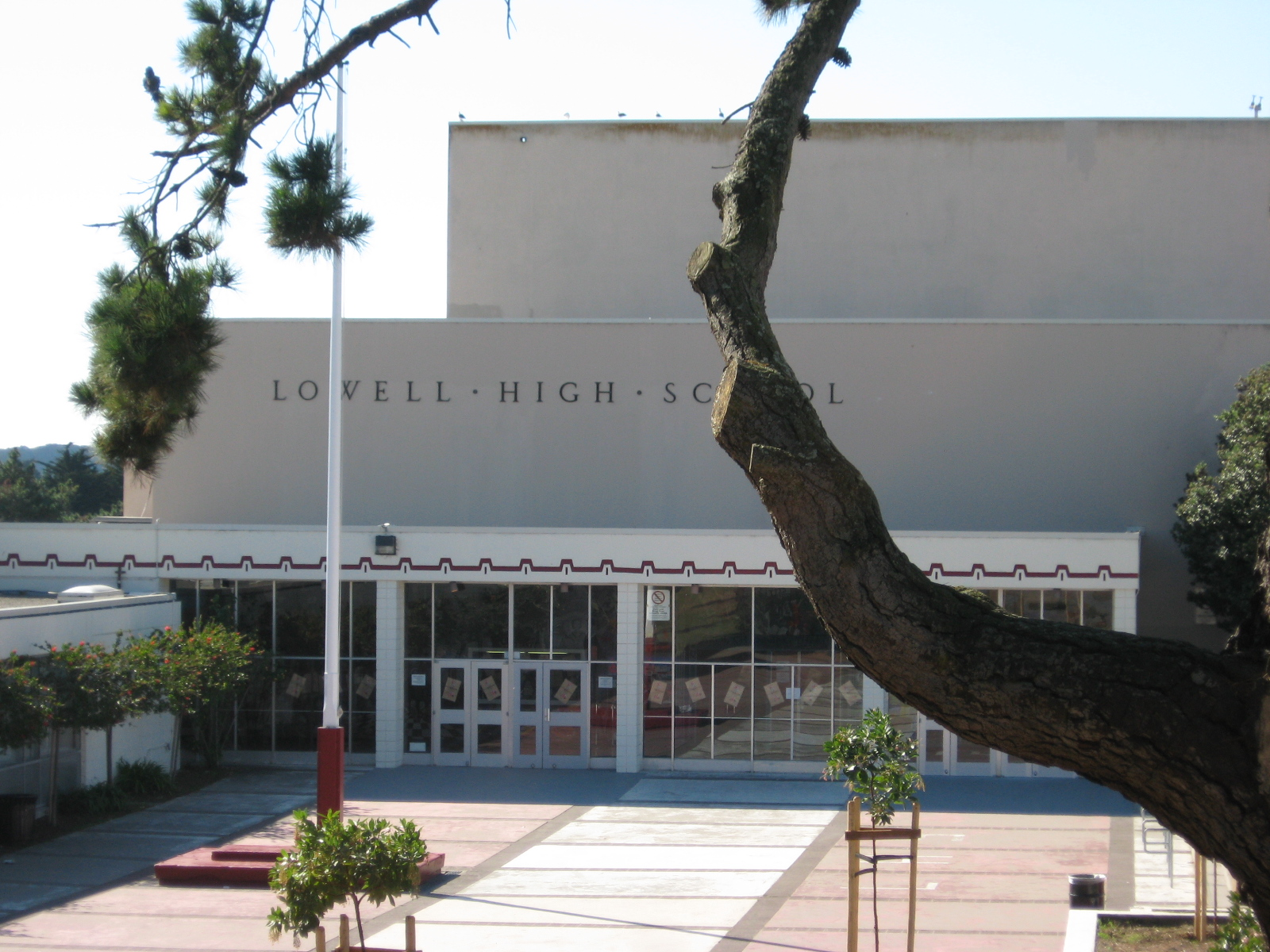
Lowell High School

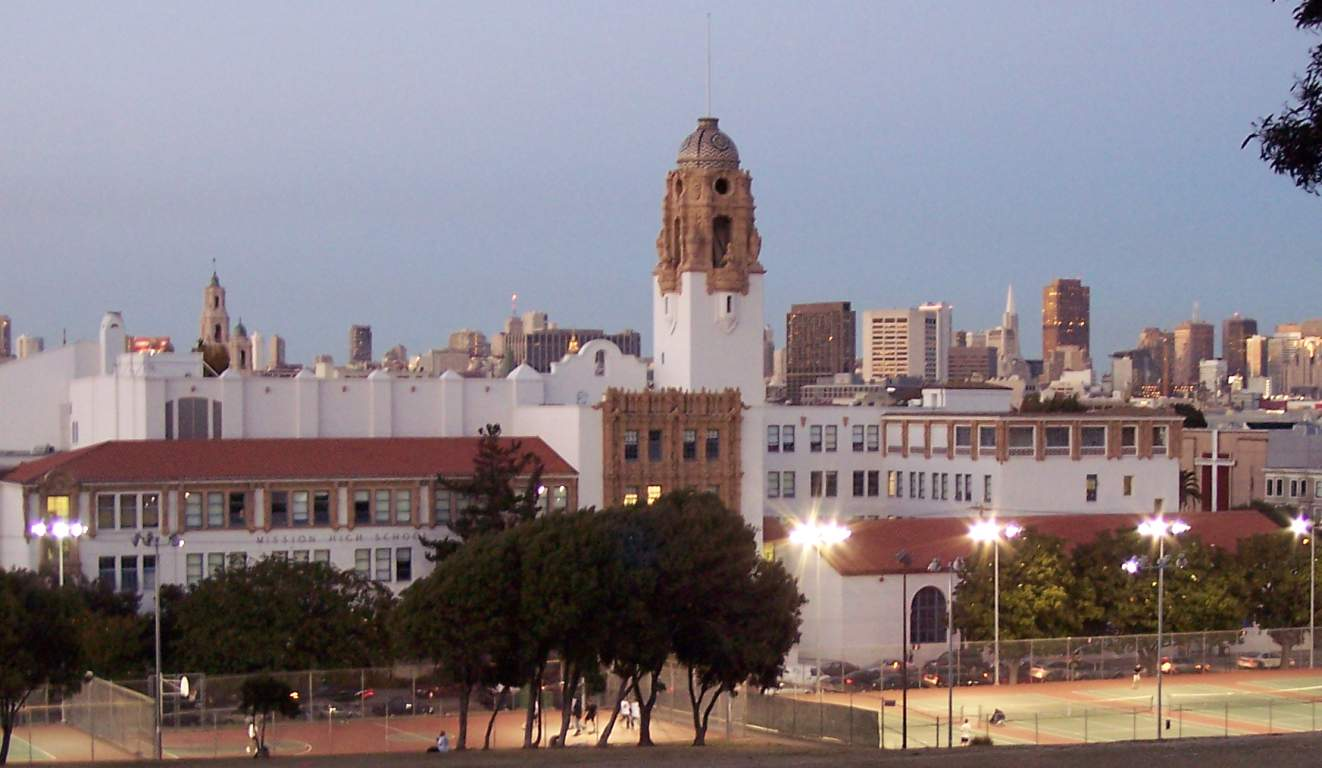
Mission High School

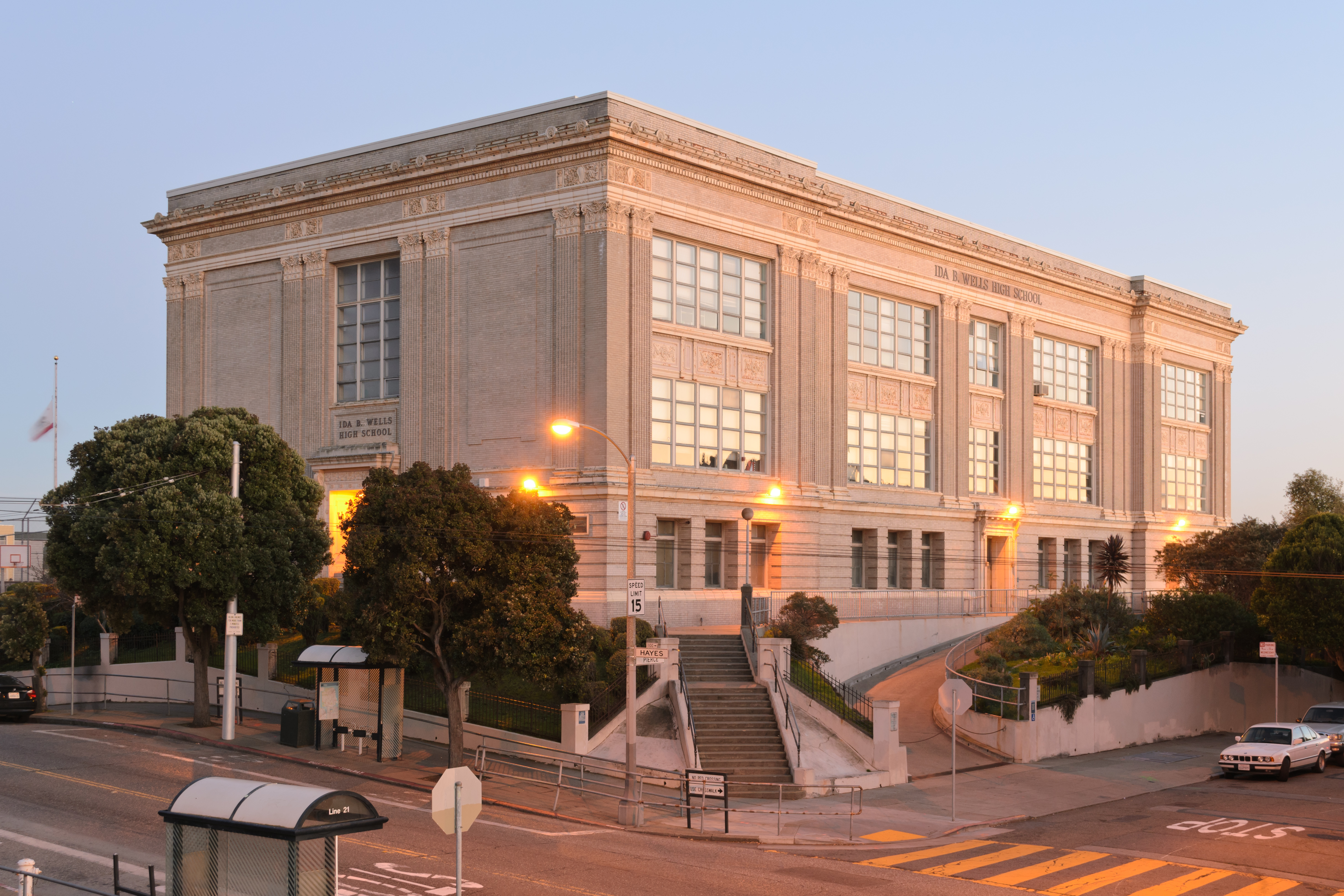
Ida B. Wells High School

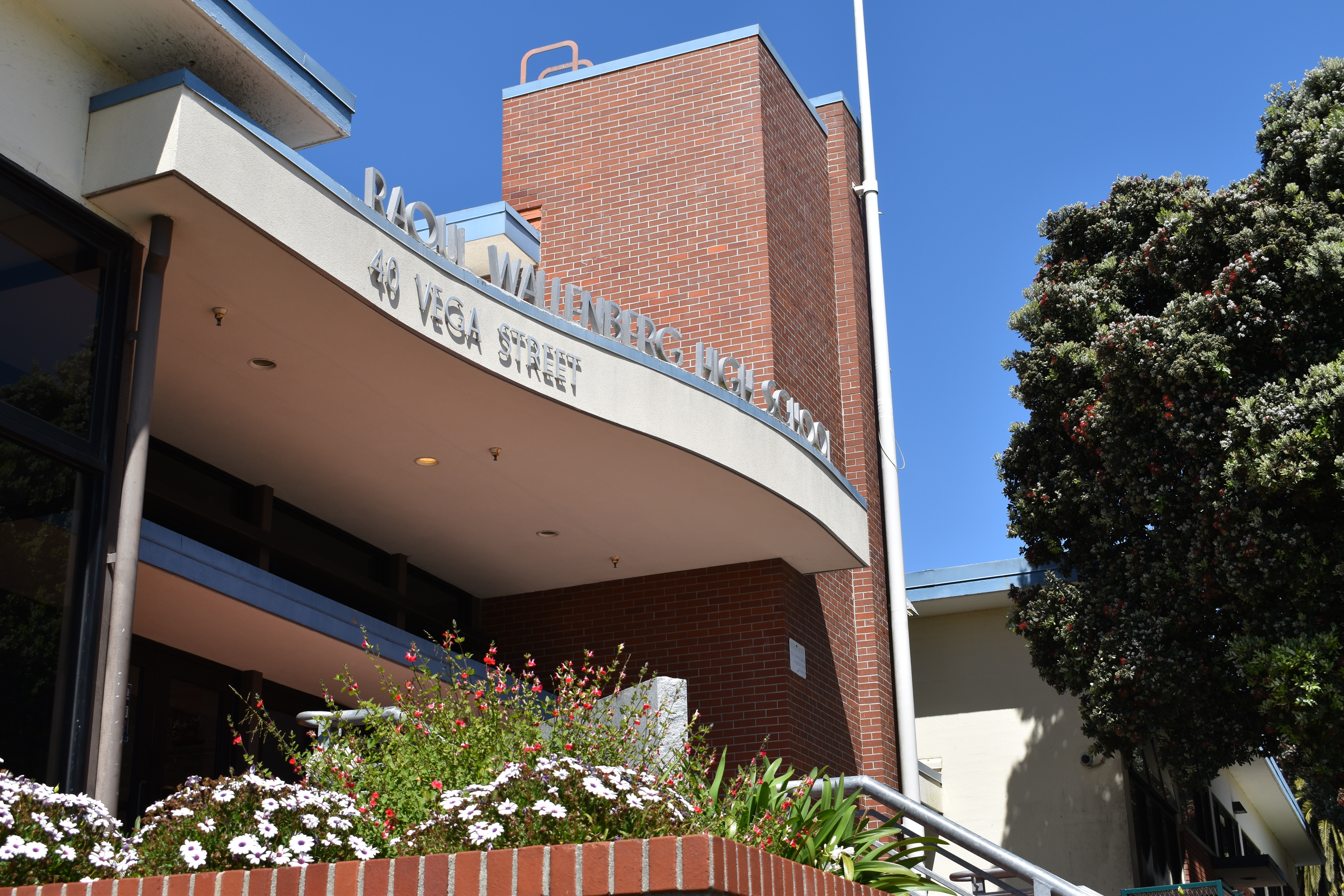
Raoul Wallenberg High School

=== Comprehensive high schools (9–12) ===
- Abraham Lincoln High School
- Balboa High School
- Galileo Academy of Science and Technology
- George Washington High School
- Lowell High School
- Mission High School
- Phillip & Sala Burton High School
- Raoul Wallenberg Traditional High School
- Thurgood Marshall Academic High School

=== Alternative high schools ===
- Civic Center Secondary School (7–12)
- Downtown High School (11–12)
- Hilltop High School (7–12)
- Ida B. Wells Continuation High School
- Independence High School
- John O'Connell High School of Technology
- June Jordan School for Equity
- Ruth Asawa School of the Arts
- San Francisco International High School

=== Middle schools (6–8) ===
- Aptos Middle School
- Denman Middle School
- Everett Middle School
- Francisco Middle School
- Giannini Middle School
- Herbert Hoover Middle School
- James Lick Middle School
- Marina Middle School
- Martin Luther King Jr. Academic Middle School
- Presidio Middle School
- Roosevelt Middle School
- Visitacion Valley Middle School
- Willie L. Brown Jr. Middle School

=== Combined elementary/middle schools (K–8) ===
- Alice Fong Yu Alternative School
- Bessie Carmichael Elementary/Middle School
- Buena Vista/Horace Mann Community School
- Claire Lilienthal Alternative School
- Lawton Alternative School
- Paul Revere Elementary School
- Rooftop School (Divided into 2 campuses, One for elementary and one for middle school)
- San Francisco Community School

=== Elementary (K–5) schools ===
- Alamo
- Alvarado
- Argonne
- Bret Harte
- Bryant
- Charles R. Drew
- Chinese Immersion School at De Avila 中文沈浸學校
- Clarendon
- Cleveland
- César Chávez
- Commodore Sloat
- Dianne Feinstein
- Doloroes Huerta
- El Dorado
- E. R. Taylor
- Francis Scott Key
- Frank McCoppin
- Garfield
- George Peabody
- George Washington Carver
- Glen Park
- Gordon J. Lau
- Grattan
- Guadalupe
- Harvey Milk
- Hillcrest
- Jean Parker
- Jefferson
- Jose Ortega
- John Muir
- John Yehall Chin
- Junipero Serra
- Lafayette
- Lakeshore
- Leonard R. Flynn
- Longfellow
- Malcolm X
- McKinley
- Miraloma
- Mission Bay
- Monroe
- Moscone
- New Traditions
- Redding
- Robert Louis Stevenson
- Rosa Parks
- Sanchez
- San Francisco Public Montessori
- Sheridian
- Sherman
- Spring Valley
- Starr King
- Sunnyside
- Sunset
- Sutro
- Tenderloin
- Ulloa
- Visitacion Valley
- Webster
- West Portal
- William L. Cobb
- Yick Wo

== Closed or merged schools ==
=== High schools ===
- High School of Commerce (closed 1952)
- Newton J. Tharp Commercial School (closed 1952)
- Polytechnic High School (closed 1972)
- J. Eugene McAteer High School (closed 2002)
- Urban Pioneer Experiential Academy (closed 2004)
- Woodrow Wilson High School (closed and merged into Burton for the 1994-95 year)
- Metropolitan Arts and Tech High School (closed 2013)
- International Studies Academy (closed 2016)
- The Academy - San Francisco @ McAteer (closed and merged into Wallenberg 2026)

=== Middle schools ===
- Benjamin Franklin Middle School (closed 2005)
- Aim High Academy (closed 2006)
- Luther Burbank Middle School (closed 2006)
- Enola Maxwell Middle School (closed 2006)
- Gloria R. Davis College Preparatory Academy (closed 2007)
- Horace Mann Middle School (closed 2011 and merged into Buena Vista Elementary to create Buena Vista Horace Mann K-8)

=== K-8 schools ===
- Treasure Island School (closed 2005)
- Twenty First Century College Preparatory Academy (renamed 2005 to Willie L. Brown Jr. Academy College Preparatory School)
- Willie L. Brown Jr. Academy College Preparatory School (closed 2011 and replaced with Willie L. Brown Jr. Middle School)

=== Elementary schools ===
- Anza Elementary School (closed 1981)
- William R. De Avila Elementary (closed 2005)
- Golden Gate Elementary (closed 2005)
- Cabrillo Elementary School (closed 2006)
- JBBP West (closed 2006)
- John Swett Alternative Elementary (closed 2006)
- Buena Vista Elementary (closed 2011 and merged into Horace Mann Middle School to create Buena Vista Horace Mann K-8)

== Superintendents ==
The following is a list of SFUSD Superintendents: (additional information is needed to complete the list between 1851 and 1934)

- 1850–1852: Thomas J. Nevins
- 1902–1905: William Langdon
- 1905–1922: Alfred Roncovieri
- 1934–1935: Edwin A. Lee
- 1936–1942: Joseph P. Nourse
- 1943–1946: Curtis E. Warren
- 1947–1954: Herbert Clish
- 1955–1966: Harold Spears
- 1967–1970: Robert Jenkins
- 1970–1972: Thomas Shaheen
- 1972–1975: Steven Morena
- 1975–1985: Robert F. Alioto
- 1985–1986: Carlos V. Cornejo (interim)
- 1986–1992: Ramon C. Cortines
- 1992–1999: Waldemar "Bill" Rojas
- 1999–2000: Linda F. Davis (interim)
- 2000–2006: Arlene Ackerman
- 2006–2007: Gwen Chan (interim)
- 2007–2012: Carlos A. Garcia
- 2012–2016: Richard A. Carranza
- 2016–2017: Myong Leigh (interim)
- 2017 – 2022: Vincent Matthews
- 2022 – 2024: Matt Wayne
- 2024 – present: Karling Aguilera-Fort (acting)
- 2024 – nominee: Maria Su (nominee)

== Demographics ==
SFUSD is 36% Latino, 32% Asian, 13.3% White, 8% Black, 7.4% Multiracial, 0.7% Pacific Islander, and 0.2% Native American. 4% are unreported. The district's Latino student body is disproportionate in comparison to the city of San Francisco's Latino population (36% vs. 16%), whereas the Asian student body percentage is almost roughly the same (32% vs. 37%), and the White student body is very low compared to the city as a whole (40%); the Black student body is slightly higher (8% vs. 6%).

== See also ==
- San Francisco County high schools
- San Francisco Board of Education
- Reading Partners
