= Academy of Arts & Sciences (San Francisco) =

Public high school

The Academy- San Francisco @ McAteer

Location
- 555 Portola Drive; San Francisco, California, United States of America; 37.745044°N 122.449582°W

Information
- School type: Public
- School district: San Francisco Unified School District
- Principal: Hollie Mack
- Grades: 9-12
- Enrollment: 360
- Colours: Black and Gold
- Mascot: Wolves
- Accreditation: Western Association of Schools and Colleges
- Website: AAS Website

The Academy San Francisco @ McAteer, formally known as Academy of Arts & Sciences was a public high school located in San Francisco, California. The school was a member of the San Francisco Unified School District. The school occupied the site of the former J. Eugene McAteer High School, which was operating from 1973 to 2002. It also shared the site of Ruth Asawa San Francisco School of the Arts.

== History ==
Reid & Tarics designed, from 1967, Diamond Heights High School, Thomas J. Mellon, Chief Administrative Officer of San Francisco, suggested it be renamed for Martin Luther King, it was renamed for California State Senator J. Eugene McAteer (February 28, 1916 – May 26, 1967) in April 1972, which operated from 1973 to 2002.

== Statistics ==
=== Demographics ===
2016-17

White	African American	Latino	Asian	American Indian	Two or More Races	Not Reported
14.9%	14.9%	34.3%	19.6%	1.1%	3.9%	4.4%

=== Standardized testing ===
SAT Scores for 2015-16
	Writing Average	Math Average	Reading Average
The academy	46 2	469	484
District	467		474
Statewide	477	494	484

== Student activities ==
=== Athletics ===
Fall

- Cheerleading
- Cross Country
- Girls Volleyball

Winter

- Boys Basketball
- Girls Basketball
- Boys Soccer
- Girls Soccer

Spring

- Badminton
- Baseball
- Fencing
- Girls Softball
- Track & Field
- Boys Volleyball
