= Mayoralty of Dianne Feinstein =

38th Mayor of San Francisco (1978–1988)

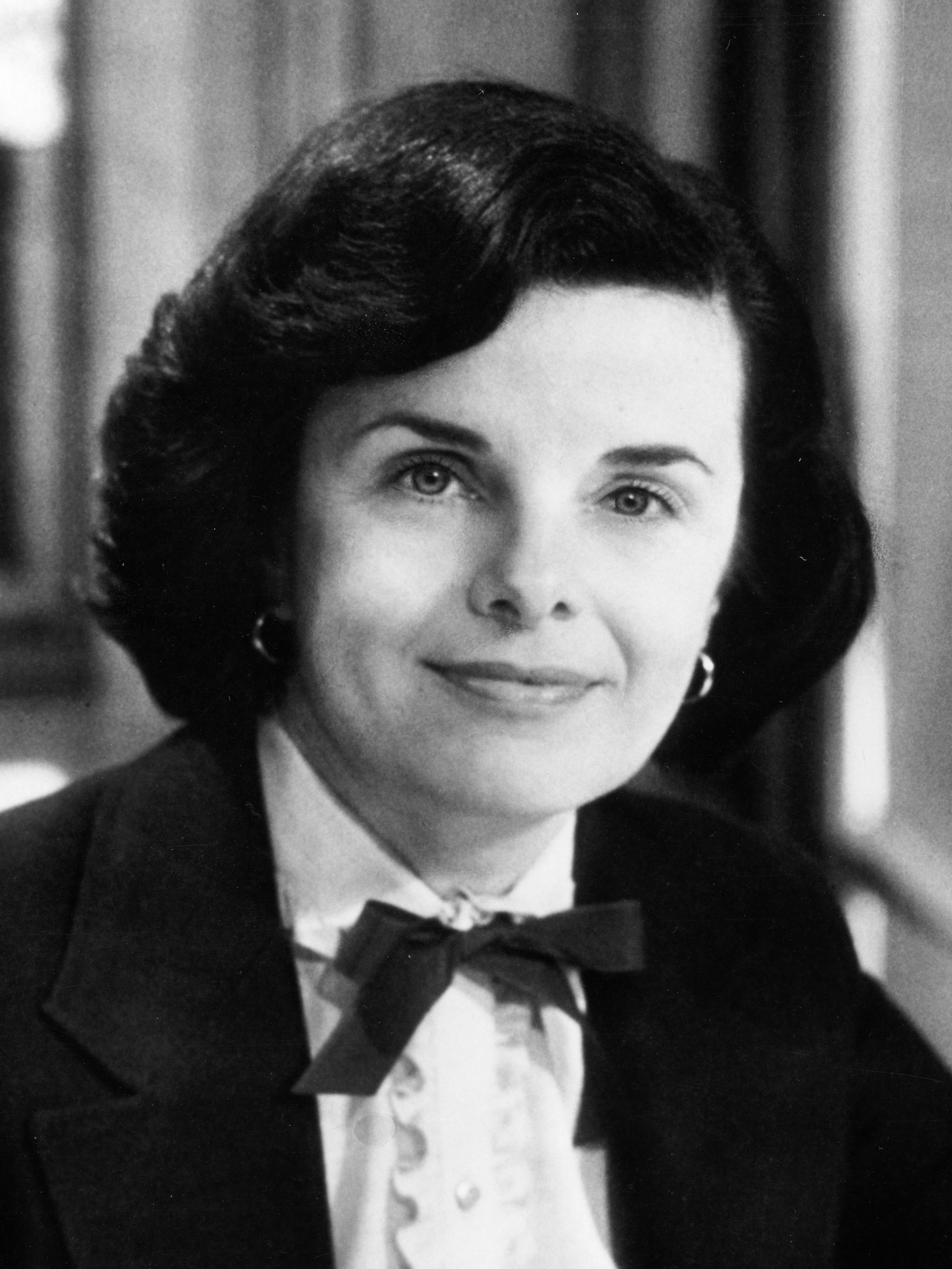
- Feinstein's portrait in 1981
- Mayoralty of Dianne Feinstein; November 27, 1978 – January 8, 1988
- Mayor: Dianne Feinstein
- Party: Democratic
- Election: 1979; 1983 recall; 1983
- Seal of San Francisco, California

The mayoralty of Dianne Feinstein lasted from November 27, 1978, to January 8, 1988, while she served as the 38th Mayor of San Francisco. Feinstein gained the position following the Moscone–Milk assassinations, in which her predecessor, Mayor George Moscone, was killed by Dan White, a former member of the San Francisco Board of Supervisors. She was formally appointed to the position by the Board of Supervisors by a vote of six to two and inaugurated on December 4, 1978.

Feinstein appointed three of the eleven member San Francisco Board of Supervisors within a month of her appointment as mayor. She won a term in her own right in 1979, survived a recall election, and won reelection in 1983. During her tenure she oversaw the first city budget to exceed $1 billion, saw large budget surpluses, traveled to multiple eastern Asian countries, enacted gun control legislation, enacted the first rent control legislation, oversaw the city's reaction to HIV/AIDS, and instituted other economic and social policies in San Francisco.

During her tenure as mayor Feinstein had a high approval rating and was listed as the most effective mayor in the United States by City & State in 1987.

== Tenure ==
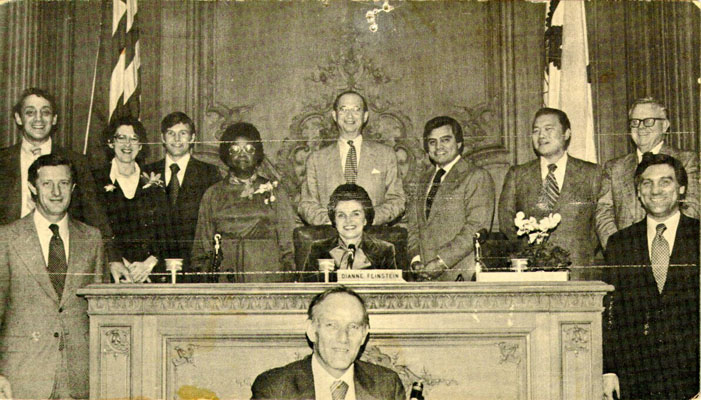
Dianne Feinstein (center) while serving as president of the San Francisco Board of Supervisors

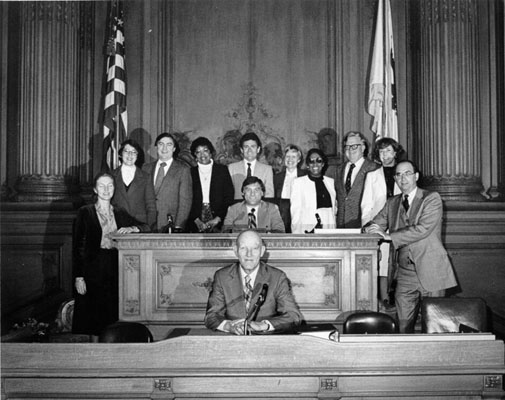
The San Francisco Board of Supervisors in 1981, which includes Dianne Feinstein's appointees Harry Britt and Louise Renne

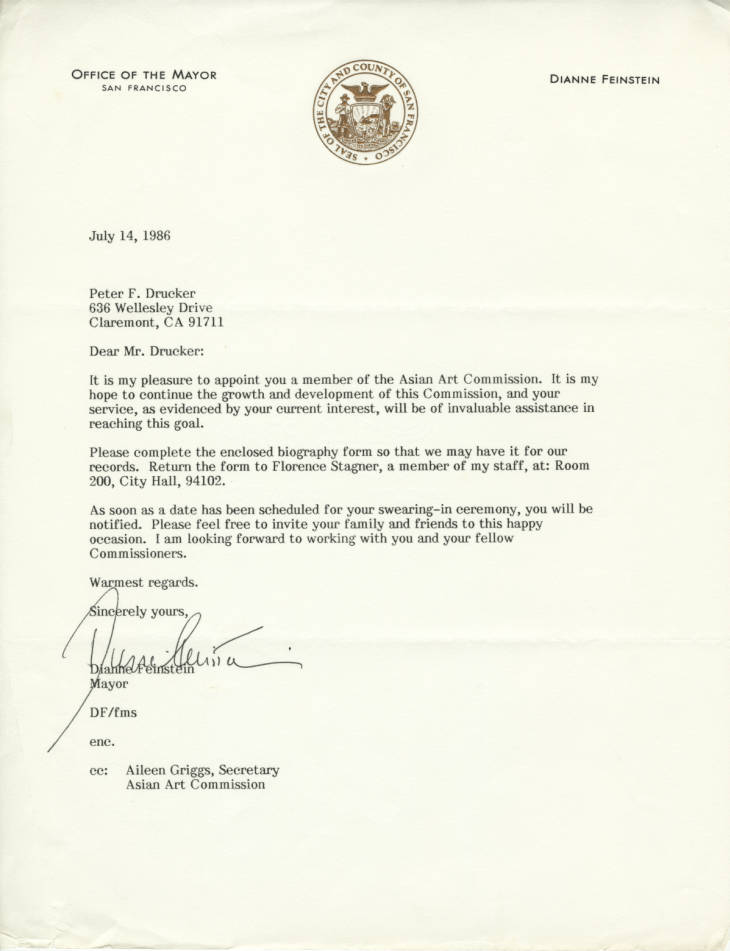
A letter written by Mayor Dianne Feinstein

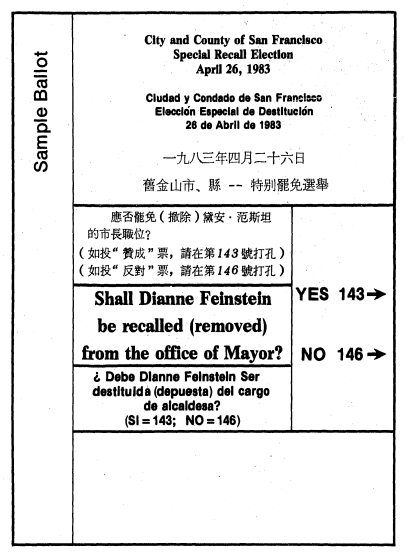
A sample multilingual ballot (in English, Spanish, and Chinese) for the 1983 San Francisco mayoral recall election

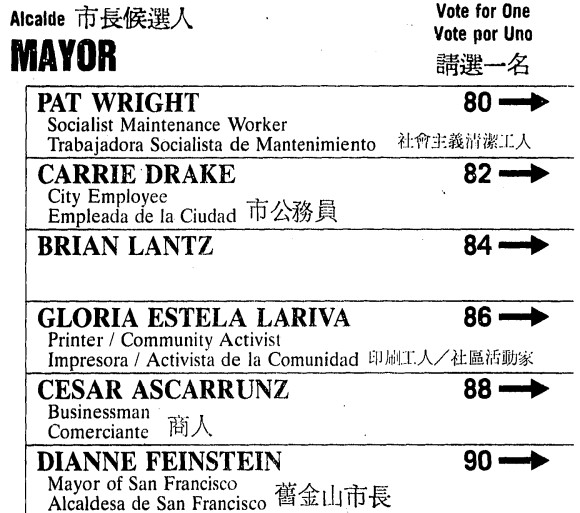
A sample ballot for the 1983 San Francisco mayoral election

=== Appointment ===
Dianne Feinstein was elected to the San Francisco Board of Supervisors in the 1969 elections, and unsuccessfully sought election to the mayoral office in 1971 and 1975.

On November 27, 1978, Mayor George Moscone and Supervisor Harvey Milk were assassinated by former Supervisor Dan White. Feinstein became acting mayor as she was President of the Board of Supervisors. Supervisors John Molinari, Ella Hill Hutch, Ron Pelosi, Robert Gonzales, and Gordon Lau endorsed Feinstein for an appointment as mayor by the Board of Supervisors. Gonzales initially ran to be appointed by the Board of Supervisors as mayor, but dropped out. The Board of Supervisors voted six to two in favor of appointing Feinstein as mayor. Feinstein was inaugurated by Chief Justice Rose Bird of the Supreme Court of California on December 4, 1978, becoming the first female and Jewish Mayor of San Francisco. Molinari was selected to replace Feinstein as president of the Board of Supervisors by a vote of eight to two. Feinstein served until January 8, 1988, when she was succeeded by Art Agnos.

=== Appointments ===
Feinstein stated that another homosexual person should be appointed to replace Harvey Milk on the Board of Supervisors following his assassination. On January 8, 1979, she appointed Harry Britt, a homosexual, to fill the vacancy created by Milk's assassination. Feinstein pledged to appoint Don Horanzy to replace Dan White on the Board of Supervisors, but postponed his appointment due to a possible conflict of interest. She appointed Horanzy to the Board of Supervisors on December 7, 1978. Feinstein also appointed Louise Renne, an environmental law expert and former deputy attorney general, to serve out the remaining three years of her own term on the Board of Supervisors. Feinstein appointed Willie Kennedy to the Board of Supervisors in 1981, following the death of Ella Hill Hutch.

She appointed Richard Sklar as general manager of the San Francisco Public Utilities Commission on February 14, 1979. She appointed Joe Perry to serve on the Recreation and Parks Commission. Feinstein was criticized by members of the gay community and Britt for naming a heterosexual person to a seat traditionally held by homosexual people on the Board of Permit Appeals.

Moscone appointed Bernard Teitelbaum and Rudy Nothenberg as his deputy mayors, but Teitelbaum left Feinstein's administration in 1979. Hadley Roff, a former reporter who had political connections to Joseph Alioto, Ted Kennedy, Edmund Muskie, and John V. Tunney, was selected by Feinstein to replace Teitelbaum and served until his resignation during Agnos' administration in 1989. James Lazarus was appointed to replace Nothenberg as deputy mayor in 1983.

Feinstein stated in a letter that she would not fire Police Chief Charles Gain, with her stating that she would "support the chief". However, she later asked for the police commission to replace Gain after he had been criticized for being too lenient during the White Night riots, which caused a no-confidence vote by the San Francisco Police Officers Association that Gain lost by a vote of 1,081 to 22. She appointed Cornelius P. Murphy II to replace Gain. Murphy served until 1986, when he resigned and Feinstein appointed Frank Jordan to replace him.

The Feinstein City Government
Office	Name	Term
Mayor	Dianne Feinstein	1978-1988
Deputy Mayor	Bernard Teitelbaum	1979–1979
Rudy Nothenberg	1979–1983
Hadley Roff	1979–1988
James Lazarus	1983–1988
City Attorney	George Agnost	1977-1986
Philip Ward	1986-1986
Louise Renne	1986-1988
District Attorney	Arlo Smith	1980-1988
Sheriff	Gene Brown	1979-1980
Michael Hennessey	1980-1988

=== Approval ===
A poll conducted in 1979, with 385 respondents reported that 7% viewed Feinstein as having done an excellent job, 36% viewed her tenure as good, 43% viewed her tenure as fair, and 9% viewed her tenure as poor. A poll conducted in 1986, showed Feinstein with an excellent or good approval rating of 68%, a fair approval rating of 22%, and a poor approval rating of 8%. Feinstein was named as the most effective mayor by City & State in 1987.

=== Civil rights ===
Feinstein persuaded the owners of the Alhambra Theater to stop showing Boulevard Nights causing Tony Bill, the producer of the movie, to accuse her of ignoring the problem of gang violence in San Francisco and the American Civil Liberties Union to accuse her of violating the First and Fifth Amendments. In 1980, she had the screening of Cruising moved to a different theater stating that it "is not in censorship, but in preserving the public peace. We don't want another gay riot up here." She asked United Artists to pay the city for more than $130,000 in police security operations that were made after the company refused to delay the opening of Cruising. The ACLU stated that the demand was unconstitutional and a violation of the First Amendment.

Feinstein signed legislation that banned official San Francisco city travel to states that had not ratified the Equal Rights Amendment. The first use of the legislation was in 1981, when Feinstein cancelled a trip planned by two airport officials to a convention in Reno, Nevada, due to Nevada having not passed the Equal Rights Amendment. Feinstein violated the law when she attended the United States Conference of Mayors convention in Chicago, Illinois, a state which had not passed the Equal Rights Amendment. Two members of the Board of Supervisors objected to the trip, but Renne stated that Feinstein's presence at the convention would highlight the political accomplishments of women.

She increased police presence in gay neighborhoods in San Francisco to prevent gay bashing and stated about gay people that "we're going to protect you". The Board of Supervisors approved legislation in 1982, that would provide health benefits for city employees' live-in lovers, including homosexuals, but the legislation was vetoed by Feinstein. Feinstein claimed she vetoed the legislation because it was vaguely written, and said that the veto was not intended as "a comment on any lifestyle." Around 300 gay protestors came to city hall where they criticized Feinstein and accused her of capitulating to the Catholic Church. The eleven member Task Force on Equal Benefits, a task force formed by Feinstein, recommended in 1984, that live-in lovers of gay city workers should receive the same health benefits given to live-in lovers of heterosexual city workers, but she rejected it.

In 1983, Feinstein signed legislation which granted up to $5,000 to each victim of the United States' internment of Japanese Americans during World War II becoming one of the first cities to do so. California had already enacted statewide legislation granting $5,000 to Japanese Americans who were forced to leave state government jobs.

=== Crime and police ===
In 1979, a delegation of women rallied outside of the mayoral reception room in city hall accusing her of trying to settle a police discrimination lawsuit. Earl Sanders, a black Homicide Inspector, stated that "Mayor Feinstein is selling out the right of minorities and women. We feel Feinstein has the obligation to negotiate a fair resolution, not one that merely placates the Police Officers Association." Henry Der, the head of the Chinese for Affirmation Action organization, stated that "Dianne Feinstein pledged to heal the city's wounds and bring the people together. How can she bring us together when she blatantly ignores us? This is hypocrisy. She is making a mockery of her pledge. She is a master mental contortionist and we cannot be a party to the perpetuation of racism and sexism."

Feinstein and thirty-eight members of the United States Congress called for President Jimmy Carter to enact stronger gun control in 1979. Feinstein proposed a ban on the private possession of handguns in 1982, with the punishment for violating the proposed law being thirty days in jail. Her proposed handgun ban received opposition from the San Francisco Police Officers Association while being supported by the Bar Association of San Francisco. The Public Protection Committee of the Board of Supervisors voted two to one in favor of Feinstein's handgun ban and was later approved by the Board of Supervisors by a vote of six to five. San Francisco was the largest city to institute a ban on handguns. California Attorney General George Deukmejian stated in a non-binding opinion that a "California city does not have the legislative authority to prohibit the possession of operative handguns within the city even if law enforcement officers are excluded from the prohibition". The first district of the California Courts of Appeal ruled unanimously that San Francisco could regulate guns, but could not supersede California state law which already existed regarding handgun licensing and registration. The Supreme Court of California refused to review the ruling of the Court of Appeals. Only thirty guns were handed over to the government during the ban.

=== Economic policy ===
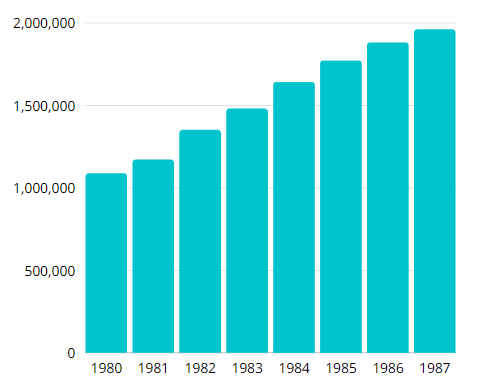
The city budget of San Francisco from 1980 to 1987

The first rent control legislation in San Francisco's history was enacted during Feinstein's tenure in 1979. The Board of Supervisors passed a resolution calling for a sixty day freeze on prices in response to the passage of Proposition 13 and the resolution was signed by Feinstein on April 24, 1979. She later signed into law a 7% ceiling on rent increases in 1980. However, she vetoed legislation that would have stopped landlords from increasing the price of rent for vacated apartments. Feinstein proposed a plan to sell up to $100 million in revenue bonds and procuring federal grants to subsidize home purchases which would create 500 to 1,000 new housing units.

In 1980, Feinstein proposed a $1.087 billion city budget, a $125 million increase from the 1979 budget of $962 million and the first budget in the city's history to be higher than $1 billion, which called for the firing of 62 city employees, the elimination of 515 vacant positions, and a decreased budget for the San Francisco Fire Department. The Board of Supervisors voted six to one to approve a $1.081 billion budget, which was around $8.5 million less than the budget proposed by Feinstein. She proposed a city budget of $1.17 billion in 1981. In 1982, she proposed a $1.35 billion budget which increase police funding, decreased employees in other city departments, and which had an estimated surplus of $62 million. At the start of January 1983, San Francisco had a $150 million budget surplus with plans for $80 million to be saved, around $70 million to be spent on capital improvements, and $20 million to be spent on street repairs, park renovations, and library renovations. She proposed a $1.48 billion budget, which would increase police, fire, health, and mass transit funding, for the fiscal year of 1983 to 1984. She proposed a $1.64 billion budget in 1984, with a budget surplus of $122.6 million. She proposed a $1.77 billion budget in 1985, which had an estimated budget surplus of $59.4 million. Feinstein proposed a $1.88 billion budget in 1986. In 1987, Feinstein proposed a $1.96 billion budget.

Feinstein criticized the 1981 $24.5 billion California state budget proposed by Governor Jerry Brown due to it decreasing money allocated for cities and counties by more than $900 million.

On July 17, 1980, 6,000 workers, who were members of the Hotel Employees and Restaurant Employees Union and the Hotel Employers Association, went on strike against the thirty-six largest hotels in San Francisco, which accounted for half of the city's 30,000 hotel rooms. Feinstein intervened to help negotiate an end to the strike due to its effect on tourism and conventions, with over $23 million worth of tourism revenue being lost. During the strike eight members of the Communist Workers' Party entered Feinstein's outer office and shouted threats and obscenities in which they accused her of being behind the hotel strike and demanded that she send a message to President Carter at the Democratic National Convention. The strike ended on August 15, with a 67 page contract being written between the union leaders, hotels, and Feinstein. The international union, not the employers, had to cover the $250,000 worth of retroactive payments to employees who went on strike.

Feinstein and twenty-five other mayors called for an end to the 1981 Major League Baseball strike through telegrams to Bowie Kuhn and Marvin Miller and asked for President Ronald Reagan to also do so. She vetoed a union contract in 1985, that would have given women and minorities that worked for the city $8.8 million in pay raises, but her veto was overridden by the Board of Supervisors by a vote of nine to two.

=== Foreign policy ===
Feinstein led a fifteen-person delegation to China in 1979, to aid in the establishment of San Francisco as a major port for Chinese trade. She signed a Friendship City agreement on January 28, 1980, with Zhao Xingzhi, the vice mayor of Shanghai, China, who was part of an eight member delegation from China to San Francisco. It was the first agreement between an American and Chinese city. She led an eleven member delegation in 1981, meant to gain trade and investment deals, to Japan, China, British Hong Kong, and the Philippines. Feinstein underwent a two-week tour of Italy in 1982, and during her trip she presented gifts to Pope Pope John Paul II. She led a fifteen member delegation to China, British Hong Kong, and Korea in 1984. During her 1984 visit to China she signed a pact with Mayor Wang Daohan of Shanghai in which San Francisco would be the principal trading port for Shanghai. Feinstein led a nineteen member delegation in 1985, on a trip to Caracas, Venezuela, a sister city of San Francisco. She went to Israel in 1986, and signed a contract with the Israeli company Zim to make San Francisco the company's port of call instead of Oakland, California, and was also impressed while touring illegal Israeli settlements in the West Bank.

In 1987, Feinstein met then-Shanghai mayor Jiang Zemin. The two danced, and he sang When We Were Young to her in English.

Feinstein gave the key to the city to Kenneth D. Taylor, the Canadian ambassador to Iran, for helping Americans escape during the Iran hostage crisis. She also gave the key to the city to Italian President Sandro Pertini in 1982. She met with Pakistani dictator Muhammad Zia-ul-Haq in 1982, despite protests of his violation of human rights and a statement by the Movement for the Restoration of Democracy stating that Zia was responsible for "a reign of terror in which thousands of people have been flogged or put in jail". In 1983, she presented the key to the city to Leonardo Mathis, the Portuguese ambassador to the United States, aboard the Sagres. She gave the key to the city to Chinese Premier Zhao Ziyang in 1984. Feinstein met with Prime Minister Margaret Thatcher at 10 Downing Street on March 20, 1985. She welcomed Algerian President Chadli Bendjedid to San Francisco during his 1985 goodwill tour in the United States.

Feinstein called for President Jimmy Carter to investigate the Salvadoran Civil War and consider banning military aid to the country's military government. Feinstein cancelled San Francisco's sister city relationship with Manila, Philippines, for six months following the assassination of Benigno Aquino Jr., a former senator and opposition leader. In 1984, she proposed forming a sister city relationship with Cork, Ireland.

Feinstein signed legislation which called on the San Francisco Retirement Board to divest the city's $335 million employee pension fund which was invested in American companies doing business with South Africa. She initially opposed legislation in 1986, which would prohibit the city from contracting companies with financial ties to South Africa due to its apartheid system, but later signed it.

=== Health policy ===
Feinstein announced a plan to spend $293,000 on researching HIV/AIDS in 1982. Funding for AIDS research and helping victims was later proposed to be increased to $1.5 million and then $2.1 million. Feinstein supported closing gay bathhouses to prevent the spread of AIDS, but health officials initially wanted to leave them open with restrictions. However, the city's health director, Mervyn Silverman, announced that closing down of all gay bathhouses. The closure of the gay bathhouses was later overturned by Superior Court Judge Roy Wonder who ruled that the bathhouses could reopen if they took action to prevent the spread of AIDS. She signed legislation which prohibited discrimination against AIDS victims in housing, employment, medical services, and business. In 1984, Feinstein declared the first AIDS Awareness Week. During her tenure 2,200 people in San Francisco died from AIDS while 15,000 were diagnosed with it out of a population of 700,000 people.

== Elections ==
=== 1979 ===
On May 30, 1979, Feinstein announced that she would seek election as mayor in the 1979 election. She selected Don Bradley to serve as her campaign manager. In the initial election she came first out of ten candidates and was forced into a runoff against Quentin L. Kopp. Feinstein defeated Kopp in the runoff election with 102,233 votes against Kopp's 87,266 votes. During the campaign she spent $830,966.

=== 1983 recall ===
The White Panther Party, a group of thirty communists, opposed Feinstein's gun control efforts and stated that it was a "tyrannical attack" on their constitutional right to bear arms so the organization started collecting signatures for a recall election. Feinstein was critical of a possible recall election as it would cost San Francisco $350,000 to $400,000 to conduct the election. The White Panthers collected over 35,000 signatures for the recall election, more than the 19,357 signatures required.

An attempt was made in the Board of Supervisors to prohibit recall elections when it failed to receive unanimous support due to Supervisor Kopp, who had run against Feinstein in the 1979 mayoral election, being the only vote against it stating that "Democracy has costs as well as benefits, and I have never considered the exercise of democracy a waste of the taxpayer's money". The Republican County Central Committee of San Francisco voted twenty-three to two, with two abstaining, to oppose the recall against Feinstein and to support her campaign although some Republicans, including former Supervisor John Barbagelata, supported the recall.

The recall effort failed and Feinstein remained as mayor. During the campaign Feinstein had raised over $400,000 while the White Panthers only raised $2,500 and the Citizens for a New Mayor raised $2,670.

=== 1983 ===
Feinstein did not face any significant opposition during the 1983 San Francisco mayoral election and won with 117,489 votes for 80.10% of the popular vote against five other candidates. This was her last election as mayor due to her being term-limited by the 1987 election.

== Assessments ==
A 1993 survey of historians, political scientists and urban experts conducted by Melvin G. Holli of the University of Illinois at Chicago saw Feinstein tied with several others as the 31st-best American big-city mayor to serve between the years 1820 and 1993. The survey also saw Feinstein ranked the fourth-best big-city mayor to serve in office post-1960.
