= 1977 San Francisco Board of Supervisors election =

The 1977 San Francisco general elections occurred on November 8, 1977, for all 11 newly created electoral districts to be represented on the Board of Supervisors for the 1978 fiscal year, as well as the position of City Attorney, the position of City Treasurer and a roster of 22 propositions (an extra proposition had been withdrawn from the ballot). It was the first time in San Francisco's history that Board elections were held on a districted basis rather than on a citywide at-large basis; in the November 1976 general election, voters in San Francisco decided to reorganize supervisor elections to choose supervisors from neighborhoods instead of voting for them in citywide ballots when they voted for Proposition T, which included the definition of the district boundaries.

== Synopsis ==
The election was a watershed moment in the history of the city, as extremely fierce electoral campaigns immediately sprung into action. 113 candidates in total were registered in the total of all 11 districts.

=== Harvey Milk's campaign ===
One of the most memorable campaigns was that of Harvey Milk, a photographer, camera salesman, U.S. Navy veteran and prior candidate for the California State Assembly in 1976, who cut his teeth with campaigning in the Castro District and appealing to the LGBTQ voters of the area. He campaigned against sixteen other candidates for the District 5 post which covered the Castro, Haight-Ashbury and other nearby neighborhoods; the most successful candidate was the local lawyer Rick Stokes, who was backed by the Alice B. Toklas Memorial Democratic Club. However, Milk's campaign utilized a populist fervor and highly artistic displays in order to advertise the cause, leading even the San Francisco Chronicle to endorse his candidacy. Milk won the election with 30% of the vote against the other candidates.

=== Other campaigns ===
Other successful candidates included Carol Ruth Silver (described by The New York Times as the first un-wed mother to win a seat on the Board), Gordon Lau (the first Asian American member) and Ella Hill Hutch (the first African American female member). Dan White, a police officer and former firefighter, also won election for the first time.

== Board of Supervisors ==
Former supervisorial districts of San Francisco, 1977–1980

=== District 1 ===
- Gordon Lau
- Ronald W. Anderson
- Thomas H. Bomar
- Bernard Finn Brady
- Bill Eisen
- Roger Grimes
- Don Hill
- Edward Lawson
- John Maloney
- Athanasius (Lou) Maunupau

=== District 2 ===
- Dianne Feinstein

=== District 3 ===
- John L. Molinari

=== District 4 ===
- Ella Hill Hutch

=== District 5 ===
- Harvey Milk
- Terence Hallinan
- Rick Stokes

=== District 6 ===
- Carol Ruth Silver
- Gary Borvice

=== District 7 ===
- Robert E. Gonzales

=== District 8 ===
- Dan White
- Leonard Heinz

=== District 9 ===
- Lee S. Dolson

=== District 10 ===
- Quentin L. Kopp

=== District 11 ===
- Ron Pelosi

== City Attorney ==
- George Agnost
- Gil Graham
- Jim Reilly

== City Treasurer ==
- Kay Pachtner
- Thomas C. Scanlon (inc.)

== Propositions ==
- (A) - Park Irrigation Bonds
- (B) - Fire Department Bonds
- (C) - Airport Revenue Bonds
- (D) - Airport Revenue Bond Procedure
- (E) - Duties of the Mayor
- (F) - Term of Chief Administrative Officer
- (G) - Budget Reductions
- (H) - Dental Plan
- (I) - Pension Increase
- (J) - Disability Hearing Officers
- (K) - Supervisors' Administrative Assistant
- (L) - C.A.O.'s Executive Assistant
- (M) - Fire Department Promotional Exams
- (N) - Public Works Contract
- (O) - Progressive Payments
- (P) - Official Advertising
- (Q) - Electricians Salary Demands
- (R) - Plumbers Salary Demands
- (S) - Sheetmetal Workers Salary Demands
- ~~T (Proposition T was officially withdrawn)~~
- (U) - Declaration of Policy: International Hotel
- (V) - Declaration of Policy: Fleishhacker Pool
- (W) - Declaration of Policy: Billboard Removal

== Post-assassination ==
After both Harvey Milk and then-mayor George Moscone were assassinated by Dan White in 1978, the future of electoral districts was in doubt. Feinstein, who was serving as president of the Board at the time of the assassinations, became interim mayor immediately; a week later the Board elected her mayor in Moscone's stead to serve out his term (with Louise Renne replacing her in the Board seat), becoming the first female mayor in San Francisco's municipal history. She was elected to full terms in 1979 and 1983. Harry Britt was selected by Mayor Feinstein to succeed Milk, and would hold a seat on the Board until 1993.

In 1980, districts were abolished and replaced by the original city-at-large slate for future elections; electoral districts were only revived beginning with the 2000 election.
