= 2011 San Francisco mayoral election =

- November 8, 2011
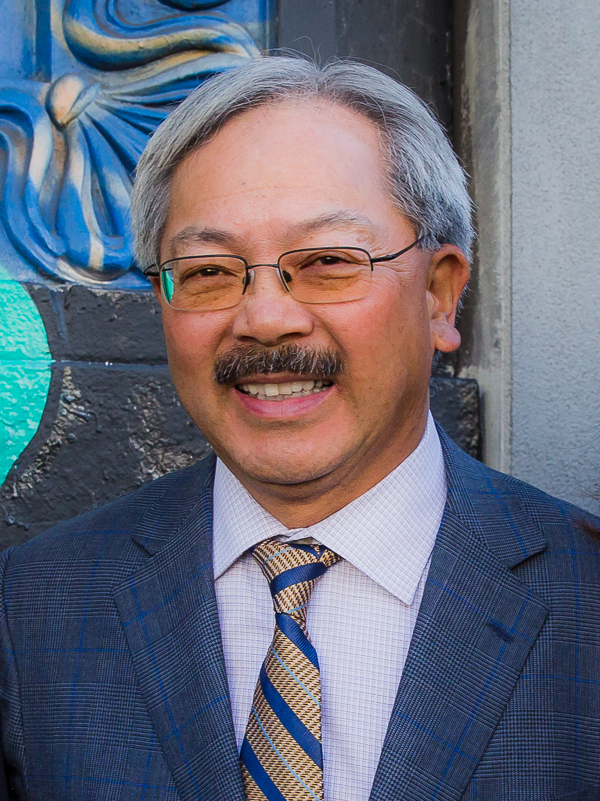

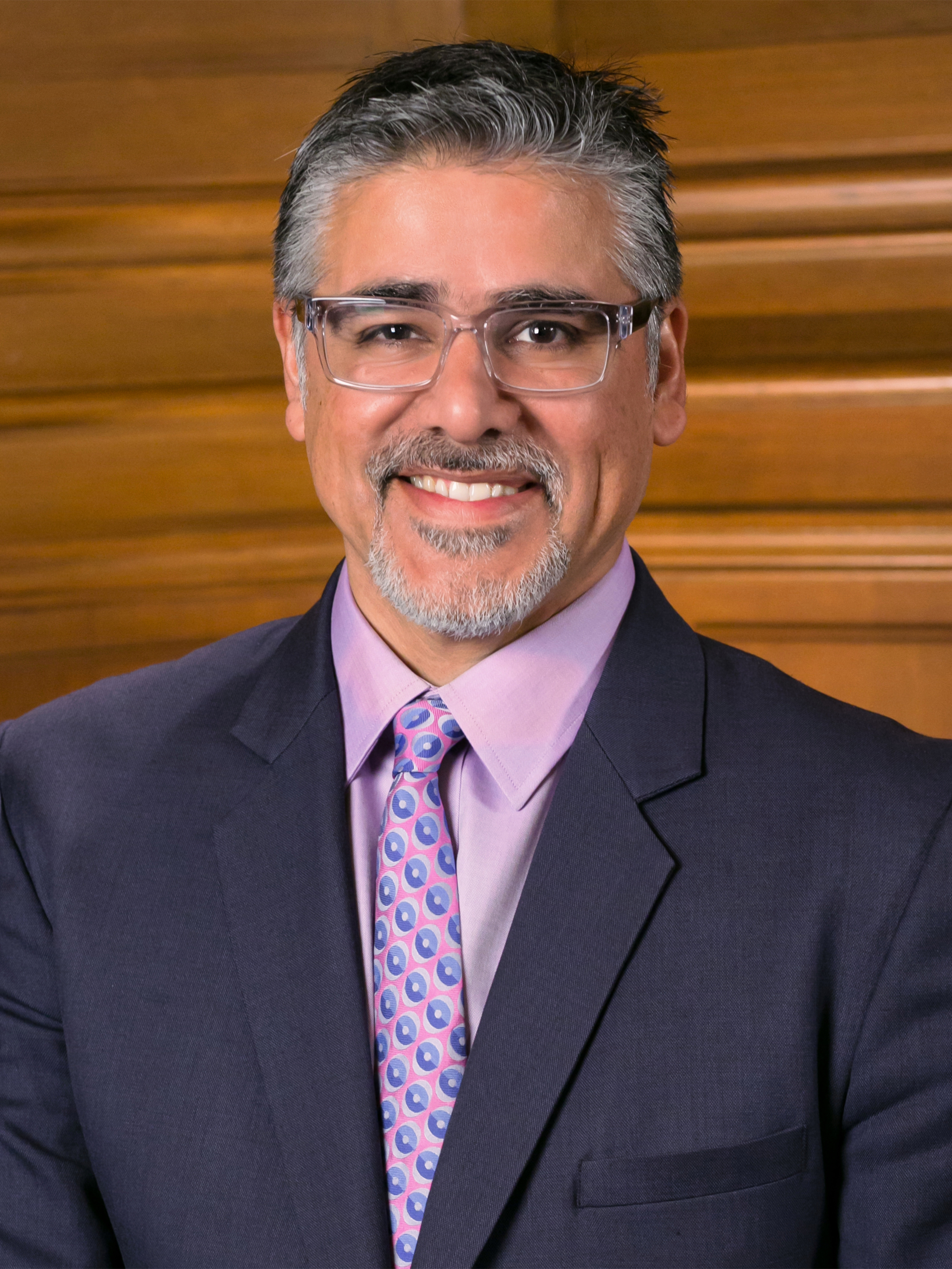

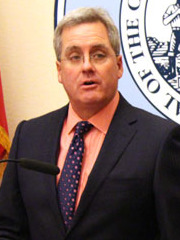

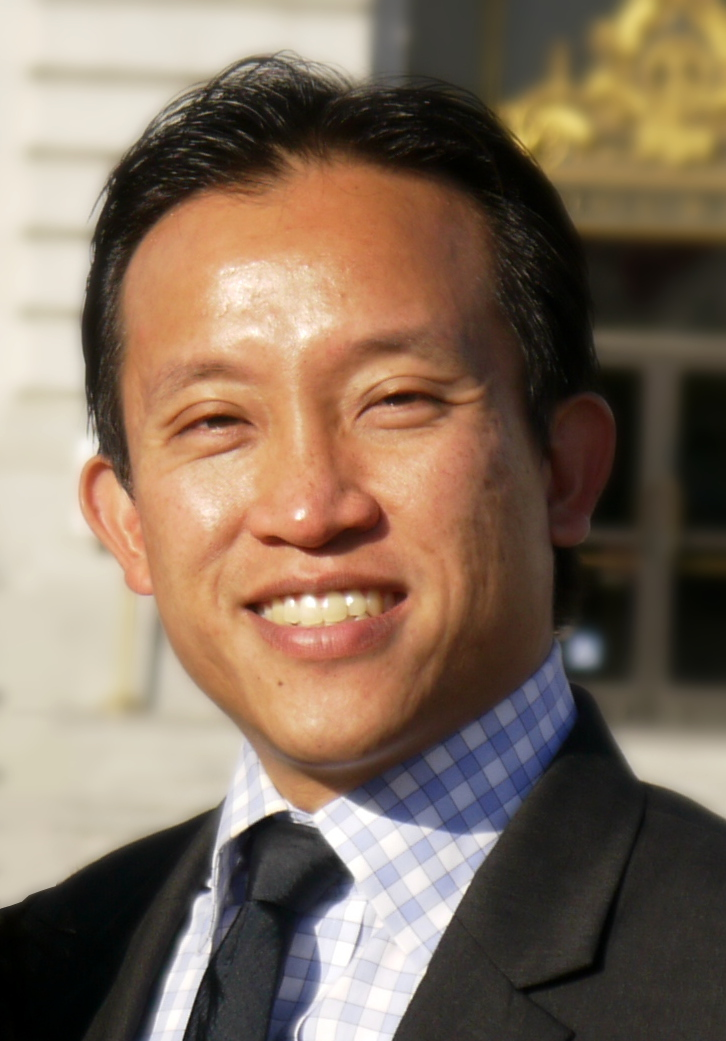

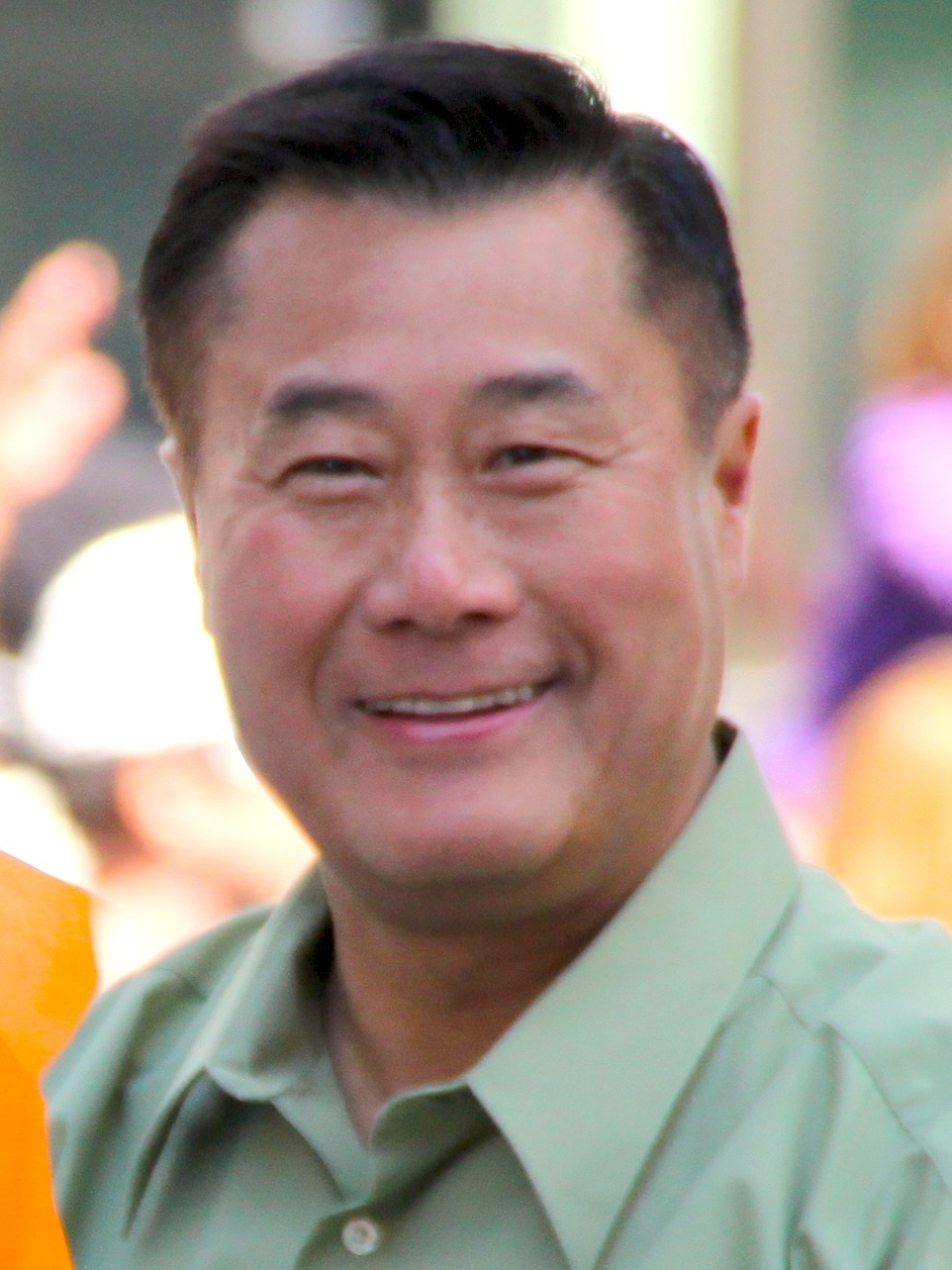

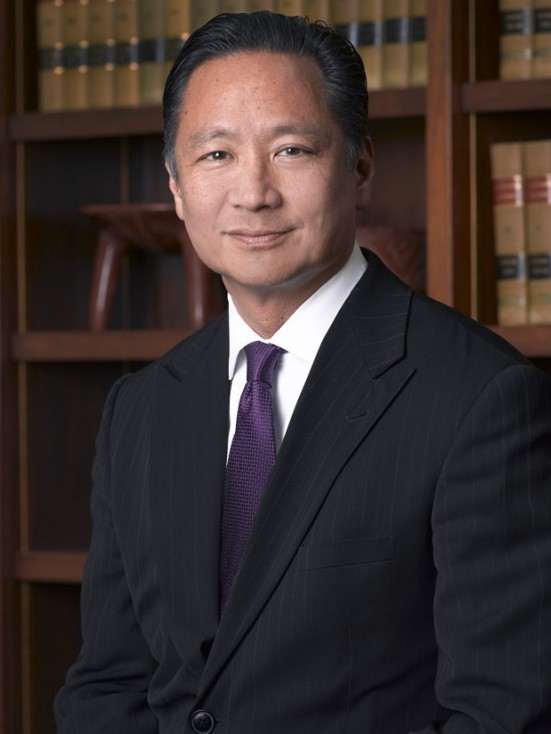
Candidate	Ed Lee	John Avalos	Dennis Herrera
First round	59,775; 30.75%	37,445; 19.26%	21,914; 11.11%
Runoff	84,457; 59.64%	57,160; 40.36%	Eliminated
Candidate	David Chiu	Leland Yee	Jeff Adachi
First round	17,921; 9.09%	14,609; 7.41%	12,534; 6.36%
Runoff	Eliminated	Eliminated	Eliminated
- First choice results by county supervisorial district Lee: 20–30% 30–40% 40–50% Avalos: 20–30% 40–50%
Mayor before election
Ed Lee
Elected mayor
Ed Lee

The 2011 San Francisco mayoral election was held on Tuesday, November 8, 2011, to elect the mayor of San Francisco. The incumbent Ed Lee, appointed to fill the vacant mayoral seat, succeeded in his bid to become the first elected Asian-American mayor of a major American city.

== Background ==
Gavin Newsom, first elected in 2003 and reelected in 2007, was elected Lieutenant Governor of California in 2010 and sworn in on January 10, 2011. Ed Lee was appointed by the San Francisco Board of Supervisors to finish the balance of Newsom's mayoral term and was sworn in on January 11, 2011. Lee initially pledged not to seek election, although an active movement arose to draft him into the race. By the end of July observers were expecting that Lee would agree to run. On August 8, 2011, Lee announced he was running for Mayor of San Francisco.

The mayoral election was run using instant runoff voting, which was adopted by a referendum in 2002. This voting method was first in effect for the 2007 mayoral election, but no transfers of votes were needed in 2007 since incumbent mayor Gavin Newsom received a majority of the first round votes.

== Candidates ==
There were sixteen candidates running:

- Jeff Adachi, Public Defender of San Francisco
- Michela Alioto-Pier, former member of the San Francisco Board of Supervisors from District 2
- Cesar Ascarrunz, nightclub owner and community service entrepreneur, mayoral candidate in 1979, 1983, 1987, 1991, and 1999
- John Avalos, member of the San Francisco Board of Supervisors from District 11
- Terry Baum, playwright and actress
- David Chiu, President of the San Francisco Board of Supervisors, member of the San Francisco Board of Supervisors from District 3
- Paul Currier
- Bevan Dufty, former member of the San Francisco Board of Supervisors from District 8
- Tony Hall, former member of the San Francisco Board of Supervisors from District 7
- Dennis Herrera, City Attorney of San Francisco
- Emil Lawrence
- Ed Lee, incumbent Mayor of San Francisco
- Wilma Pang, City College of San Francisco professor
- Joanna Rees, venture capitalist
- Phil Ting, Assessor-Recorder of San Francisco
- Leland Yee, California State Senator from California's 8th State Senate district

== Debates ==
- May 5, 2011: The Leo T. McCarthy Center for Public Service and the Common Good at the University of San Francisco partnering with a national non-profit, buildOn, hosted 'San Francisco Mayoral Candidate Forum on Service' featuring selected mayoral candidates. In attendance were Michela Alioto-Pier, John Avalos, David Chiu, Bevan Dufty, Tony Hall, Dennis Herrera, Joanna Rees, Phil Ting, and Leland Yee.
- June 16, 2011: Automattic, the developer of WordPress, hosted 'SFOpen 2011', a town-hall forum focused specifically on open government, citizen engagement and leveraging technology to build better government, moderated by tech entrepreneur Mitch Kapor. The candidates in attendance were Michela Alioto-Pier, John Avalos, David Chiu, Bevan Dufty, Tony Hall, Dennis Herrera, Joanna Rees, Phil Ting and Leland Yee.
- July 11, 2011: Valencia Corridor Merchants Association and the Hispanic Chamber of Commerce hosted a mayoral candidate debate at Public Works at 161 Erie St. In attendance were John Avalos, David Chiu, Bevan Dufty, Dennis Herrera and Leland Yee.
- August 24, 2011: The Raoul Wallenberg Jewish Democratic Club hosted a mayoral candidate debate at the JCC at 3200 California Street. In attendance were Jeff Adachi, Michela Alioto-Pier, John Avalos, David Chiu, Bevan Dufty, Dennis Herrera, Ed Lee, Phil Ting and Leland Yee.
- October 5, 2011: The League of Women Voters of San Francisco, in partnership with UCSF, hosted a mayoral candidate debate at the Robertson Auditorium, UCSF Mission Bay at 1675 Owens Street. Cheryl Jennings of ABC-7 was the moderator. In attendance were Jeff Adachi, Michela Alioto-Pier, John Avalos, Terry Joan Baum, David Chiu, Bevan Dufty, Tony Hall, Dennis Herrera, Ed Lee, Joanna Rees, Phil Ting, Leland Yee.

== Polling ==
- Note: Results are for first choice only

Poll source	Date(s) administered	Sample size	Margin of error	Adachi	Alioto-Pier	Ascarrunz	Avalos	Baum	Chiu	Currier	Dufty	Hall	Herrera	Lawrence	Lee	Pang	Rees	Ting	Yee	Other/ undecided
Survey USA	March 10–15, 2011	544	±4.3%	—	12%	—	10%	—	—	—	8%	—	9%	—	17%	—	—	1%	11%	32%
Survey USA	July 30–31, 2011	528	±4.4%	—	7%	—	10%	—	4%	—	10%	—	10%	—	35%	—	1%	1%	8%	14%
Public Opinion Strategies	August 14–16, 2011	500		5%	4%	—	6%	—	3%	—	5%	1%	7%	—	29%	—	3%	0%	7%	28%
Bay Citizen/USF	October 7–13, 2011	551	±4.4%	5.1%	4%	—	7.4%	—	3.1%	—	5.2%	3.2%	8.1%	—	31.2%	—	2.5%	0.5%	6.5%	21.1%

== Results ==
=== Results summary ===
The following table shows a summary of the instant runoff for the election. The table shows the round in which the candidate was defeated or elected the winner, the votes for the candidate in that round, and what share those votes were of all votes counting for any candidate in that round. There is also a bar graph showing those votes for each candidate and categorized as either first-round votes or votes that were transferred from another candidate.

Municipal elections in California are officially non-partisan, though most candidates in San Francisco do receive funding and support from various political parties.

San Francisco mayoral election, 2011
Candidate	Maximum round	Maximum votes	Share in maximum round	Maximum votes First round votesTransfer votes
Ed Lee (incumbent)	12	84,457	59.64%	
John Avalos	12	57,160	40.36%	
Dennis Herrera	11	37,142	22.59%	
David Chiu	10	25,267	14.51%	
Leland Yee	9	18,016	9.98%	
Jeff Adachi	8	15,670	8.43%	
Bevan Dufty	7	10,455	5.56%	
Tony Hall	6	7,896	4.14%	
Michela Alioto-Pier	5	7,378	3.82%	
Joanna Rees	4	3,185	1.64%	
Terry Joan Baum	4	1,738	0.89%	
Phil Ting	4	1,049	0.54%	
Cesar Ascarrunz	4	583	0.30%	
Wilma Pang	3	469	0.24%	
Emil Lawrence	2	397	0.20%	
Paul Currier	1	248	0.13%	
Write-in	1	38	0.02%	

San Francisco mayoral election, 2011 First Round Ballot Summary
	Count	Share of Contest Ballots
Continuing Votes	194,418	98.57%
Over Votes	820	0.42%
Under Votes	2,004	1.02%
Contest Ballots	197,242	100.00%
Registered Voters	464,380	
Contest Turnout	42.47%	

=== Vote counts by round ===
The following table shows how votes were counted in a series of rounds of instant runoffs. Each voter could mark which candidates were the voter's first, second, and third choice. Each voter had one vote, but could mark three choices for how that vote can be counted. In each round, the vote is counted for the most preferred candidate that has not yet been eliminated. Then one or more candidates with the fewest votes are eliminated. Votes that counted for an eliminated candidate are transferred to the voter's next most preferred candidate that has not yet been eliminated.

Candidate	Round 1	Round 2	Round 3	Round 4	Round 5	Round 6	Round 7	Round 8	Round 9	Round 10	Round 11	Round 12
Ed Lee	59,775	59,796	59,822	59,899	60,610	61,747	63,495	65,142	67,542	71,133	78,615	84,457
John Avalos	37,445	37,472	37,481	37,497	38,871	39,320	39,524	41,035	42,877	45,505	48,638	57,160
Dennis Herrera	21,914	21,937	21,958	21,977	22,606	23,531	24,257	27,081	29,673	32,276	37,142	
David Chiu	17,921	17,929	17,946	17,994	18,495	18,957	19,326	20,327	22,461	25,267		
Leland Yee	14,609	14,621	14,634	14,666	15,030	15,631	16,021	16,691	18,016			
Jeff Adachi	12,534	12,557	12,586	12,624	13,156	13,728	15,048	15,670				
Bevan Dufty	9,208	9,220	9,230	9,244	9,583	10,133	10,455					
Tony Hall	6,930	6,958	7,001	7,025	7,397	7,896						
Michela Alioto-Pier	6,648	6,660	6,694	6,720	7,378							
Joanna Rees	3,104	3,111	3,143	3,185								
Terry Joan Baum	1,665	1,676	1,698	1,738								
Phil Ting	1,016	1,022	1,030	1,049								
Cesar Ascarrunz	537	551	578	583								
Wilma Pang	444	456	469									
Emil Lawrence	382	397										
Paul Currier	248											
Write-in	38											
Continuing votes	194,418	194,363	194,270	194,201	193,126	190,943	188,126	185,946	180,569	174,181	164,395	141,617
Exhausted ballots	0	55	144	212	1,272	3,429	6,232	8,401	13,735	20,070	29,828	52,524
Over Votes	820	820	824	825	840	866	880	891	934	987	1,015	1,097
Under Votes	2,004	2,004	2,004	2,004	2,004	2,004	2,004	2,004	2,004	2,004	2,004	2,004
Total	197,242	197,242	197,242	197,242	197,242	197,242	197,242	197,242	197,242	197,242	197,242	197,242

Continuing votes are votes that counted for a candidate in that round. Exhausted ballots represent votes that could not be transferred because a less preferred candidate was not marked on the ballot. Voters were allowed to mark only three choices because of voting system limitations. Over votes are votes that could not be counted for a candidate because more than one candidate was marked for a choice that was ready to be counted. Under votes are ballots were left blank or that only marked a choice for a write-in candidate that had not qualified as a write-in candidate.
