= Endorsements in the 1924 Republican Party presidential primaries =

This is a list of endorsements for declared candidates in the Republican primaries for the 1924 United States presidential election.

== Calvin Coolidge ==
List of Calvin Coolidge endorsements (as of January 18, 1924)

U.S. executive branch officials

Current

- John Bartlett, Assistant Postmaster General (1922-1929)
- James Davis, Secretary of Labor (1921-1930)
- Andrew Mellon, Secretary of the Treasury (1921-1932)
- Henry Wallace, Secretary of Agriculture (1921-1924)

Former

- George Harvey, Ambassador to the United Kingdom (1921-1923)
- Carmi Thompson, Secretary of the Treasury (1912-1913)

U.S. senators

Current

- William Borah, U.S. Senator from Idaho (1907-1940)
- Edwin F. Ladd, U.S. Senator from North Dakota (1921-1925)
- Henry Cabot Lodge, U.S. Senator from Massachusetts (1921-1936) (Senate Majority Leader)
- George Moses, U.S. Senator from New Hampshire (1918-1933)
- Selden Spencer, U.S. Senator from Missouri (1918-1925)
- Thomas Sterling, U.S. Senator from North Dakota (1913-1925)
- James Watson, U.S. Senator from Indiana (1916-1933)
- Ovington Weller, U.S. Senator from Maryland (1921-1927)
- Frank Willis, U.S. Senator from Ohio (1921-1928)

Former

U.S. representatives

Current

- William Vare, Congressman from PA-1 (1923-1927)

Former

- George Bowers, Congressman from WV-2 (1916-1923)
- Thomas Chandler, Congressman from OK-1 (1921-1923)
- James Good, Congressman from IA-5 (1909-1921) (Campaign Manager - Western)
- Frank Millspaugh, Congressman from MO-1 (1921-1922)
- Bascom Slemp, Congressman from VA-9 (1907-1923) (Campaign Manager - Southern)

Governors

Current

- Percival Baxter, Governor of Maine (1921-1925)
- Alex Groesbeck, Governor of Michigan (1921-1927)

Former

- Samuel Elrod, Governor of South Dakota (1905-1907)
- James Goodrich, Governor of Indiana (1917-1921)
- Edwin Stuart, Governor of Pennsylvania (1907-1911)

Statewide officials

- Alvan Fuller, Lieutenant Governor of Massachusetts (1921-1925)
- Charles Johnson, California State Treasurer (1923-1956)
- Frank C. Jordan, California Secretary of State (1911-1940)
- William D. Sutton, Utah State Treasurer (1921-1925)

State legislators

- Frank Merriam, Speaker of the California State Assembly (1923-1926)

Local officials

- Percy Long, City Attorney of San Francisco (CA) (1908-1916)

Party officials

- William Butler, Republican National Committeeman (MA) (Campaign Manager - National)
- William Crocker, Republican National Committeeman (CA)
- Fred Upham, Republican National Committeeman (IL)

Individuals

- John Barrett, Director General of the Pan American Union (1907-1921)
- Nicholas Murray Butler, President of Columbia University (1902-1945)
- Hoke Donithan, Attorney (Campaign Manager - Ohio)
- Henry Ford, Businessman
- Wallace McCamant, Justice of the Oregon Supreme Court (1917-1918)
- T. Coleman du Pont, Businessman
- William Procter, Businessman
- Mark Requa, Mining Engineer and Petroleum Conservationist
- Frank Stearns, Businessman

Organizations

Newspapers

== Hiram Johnson ==
List of Hiram Johnson endorsements

U.S. executive branch officials

Current
Former

- Frank Hitchcock, U.S. Postmaster General (1909-1913) (Campaign Manager - National)

U.S. senators

Current

- Medill McCormick, U.S. Senator from Illinois (1919-1925)
- Peter Norbeck, U.S. Senator from South Dakota (1921-1936)

Former

- Frank Flint, U.S. Senator from California (1905-1911)
- Irwin France, U.S. Senator from Maryland (1917-1923)

U.S. representatives

Current

- Charles Christopherson, U.S. Representative from SD-1 (1919-1933)
- Royal Johnson, U.S. Representative from SD-2 (1915-1933)
- William Williamson, Congressman from SD-3 (1921-1933)

Former

Governors

Current

- William McMaster, Governor of South Dakota (1921-1925)

Former

- Ragnvald Nestos, Governor of North Dakota (1921-1925)

Statewide officials

Current

- Ray L. Riley, California State Controller
- C. C. Young, Lieutenant Governor of California
- Will C. Wood, California State Superintendent of Public Instruction

Former

- Frank R. Devlin, California State Railroad Commissioner
- Alexander McCabe, California State Insurance Commissioner

State legislators

Current

- George Bender, Ohio State Senator (1921-1931) (Campaign Manager - Ohio)

Former

- Arthur Hewitt, Speaker of the California State Assembly (1911-1912)

Local officials

- William Langdon, Judge on the California Courts of Appeal (1918-1927)

Party officials

- Albert E. Boynton, Chairman of the Republican State Central Committee (CA)

Individuals

- Seth Brown, President of the California Federation of Labor
- Katherine Philips Edson, Reformer and Social Activist
- Harold L. Ickes, Lawyer (Campaign Manager - Illinois)
- Phillip Katz, WW1 Veteran and Medal of Honor recipient
- Albert Lasker, Advertising executive
- Clarence R. Martin, Lawyer (Campaign Manager - Indiana)
- George Norbeck, Brother of Senator Peter Norbeck (Campaign Manager - South Dakota)
- George Henry Payne, Advertising executive (Campaign Manager - East)
- Harry A. Timken, Owner of the Timken Roller Bearing Axle Company
- ~~William Wrigley Jr., Industrialist~~ (Endorsement Withdrawn: March 29, 1924)

Organizations

Newspapers

== Robert M. La Follette (draft effort) ==
List of Robert M. La Follette endorsements

U.S. executive branch officials

Current

U.S. senators

Current
Former

U.S. representatives

Current

- Henry Cooper, Congressman for WI-1 (1921-1931)
- Edward Voigt, Congressman for WI-2 (1917-1927)

Former

Governors

Current

- John Blaine, Governor of Wisconsin (1921-1927)

Former

Statewide officials

- Herman Ekern, Attorney General of Wisconsin (1923-1927)
- Solomon Levitan, State Treasurer of Wisconsin (1923-1927)
- Fred Zimmerman, Secretary of State of Wisconsin (1923-1927)

State legislators

- John Cashman, State Senator (WI) (1923-1939)
- Henry Huber, State Senator (WI) (1913-1925)
- Clinton Price, State Assemblyman (WI) (1923-1925)
- John Salter, State Assemblyman (WI) (1923-1924)

Local officials

Party officials

Individuals

- Julius Engebretson, Businessman
- Henry Gunderson, Attorney
- John Reynolds Sr., District Attorney for Brown County, Wisconsin (1907-1911)
- Harry Sauthoff, District Attorney for Dane County, Wisconsin (1915-1919)

Organizations

Newspapers

== William Kenyon (draft effort) ==
List of William S. Kenyon endorsements
- Smith Brookhart, U.S. Senator from Iowa (1922-1926)

== George Pepper (draft effort) ==
List of George W. Pepper endorsements

U.S. executive branch officials

Current

U.S. senators

Current
Former

U.S. representatives

Current

- Guy Campbell, U.S. Representative from PA-36 (1917-1933)

Former

Governors

Current
Former

Statewide officials

State legislators

Local officials

Party officials

Individuals

Organizations

Newspapers
