= 1980 San Francisco hotel strike =

- Part of Labor Unions
- Date: July 17, 1980 – August 15, 1980 (46 years ago)

Parties
Hotel Employees and Restaurant Employees Union Local 2	San Francisco Hotel Employers Association

Units involved
6,000 workers	

The 1980 San Francisco hotel strike was labor dispute between 6,000 members of Local 2 the Hotel Employees and Restaurant Employees Union and the Hotel Employers Association in the San Francisco Bay Area. The strike occurred began on July 17, 1980 and was characterized by massive picket lines at luxury hotels during the peak of the tourist season. Local 2 was the largest union of the city and the strike was widely supported by the Bay Area AFL-CIO council, the International Brotherhood of Teamsters, and the International Longshore and Warehouse Union. San Francisco mayor Dianne Feinstein was also involved in ending the strike.

Local 2 was widely known as a militant union. Strikers were overwhelmingly African-American, Asian-American, and Hispanic women and they were supported by women's labor groups such as Union W.A.G.E.. In late July, the president of HERE became involved in negotiations in an attempt to end the strike. During the strike eight members of the Communist Workers' Party entered Feinstein's outer office and shouted threats and obscenities in which they accused her of being behind the hotel strike and demanded that she send a message to President Carter at the Democratic National Convention. The strike ended on August 15, with a 67 page contract being written between the union leaders, hotels, and Feinstein. The international union, not the employers, had to cover the $250,000 worth of retroactive payments to employees who went on strike.

In 2004, a similar strike recalled memories of the 1980 dispute.
