= Joanna Rees =

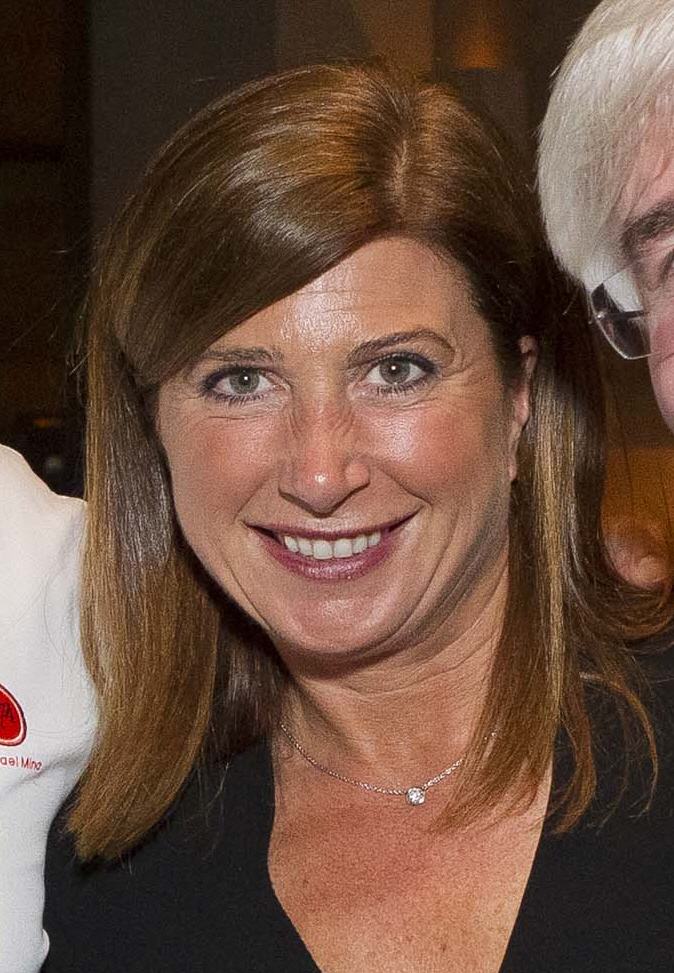
- Joanna Rees at the Moët Hennessy Financial Times Club Dinner, San Francisco, in September 2011
- Born: November 14, 1961 (age 64); Montclair, New Jersey
- Occupation: Venture Capitalist
- Employer: West Global
- Spouse: John Hamm
- Website: joannarees.net

Joanna Rees (born November 14, 1961, in Montclair, New Jersey) is a venture capitalist who founded Venture Strategy Partners and VSP Capital in San Francisco, California. She is Chairman of West Global, a venture studio in San Francisco. She also ran for Mayor of San Francisco in the November 2011 election.

== Early life ==
Rees was born in Montclair, New Jersey, in 1961, the second of four children of Joan Rees (née Pernetti) and John Rees. Rees graduated from Montclair High School where she participated in competitive gymnastics. She then attended Duke University where she also competed as a gymnast. She graduated with a bachelor's in Psychology. She earned her MBA at the Columbia Business School.

== Career ==
After moving to New York, Rees began working for the Paris, France-based food company Groupe Danone, leaving in 1989 to attend business school at Columbia University. After graduating from Columbia, she took over a family-owned hotel business which brought her back to her hometown of Montclair. After rehabilitating and selling that business, she moved to San Francisco, California, and opened Eric Restaurant in San Francisco with her now former husband, Eric Gallanter.

Rees spent more than two years in investment banking with Vrolyk & Co and BA Securities. In 1996, Rees formed Venture Strategy Partners (VSP). The firm received an injection of $25 million in March 1999, followed by $190 million in March 2000. The San Francisco-based venture capital firm also assists technology start-ups in establishing their brand marketing strategy. As of 2000, the firm was funding companies like AllBusiness.com, eStyle, and Flooz.com. VSP also backed Danger Inc., the company that developed the Sidekick. It was Rees that gave the phone to celebrities as a marketing strategy.

Rees is Chairman of the USA Advisory Board for Fon and also serves on the boards of NewSchools Venture Fund, the National Foundation for Teaching Entrepreneurship's Bay Area Board, and Duke University's Annual Fund board. She previously held a 4-year term with the National Venture Capital Association. Rees is also a Lecturer of Management at the Leavey School of Business at Santa Clara University.

Rees, along with Facebook COO Sheryl Sandberg and fellow Silicon Valley venture capitalists John Doerr and Bill Gurley recently hosted screenings of the new educational documentary "Waiting for Superman".

Rees currently serves on the Board of Directors of Endeavor, an international non-profit development organization that finds and supports high-impact entrepreneurs in emerging markets.

In March 2010, Rees began making plans to run for Mayor of San Francisco in the November 2011 elections. She filed campaign papers announcing her intent on September 1, 2010. Her candidacy was endorsed by Jennifer Siebel-Newsom, the wife of Gavin Newsom, the former mayor and current Lieutenant Governor of California. Rees refused to use her own money in the campaign and ran as an independent. She was previously registered as “decline to state”. Her campaign was led by SCN Strategies, the same firm running Newsom’s bid for Lieutenant Governor. Rees lost the election which ended with the election of Ed Lee as mayor from a field of sixteen candidates.

In 2016, Rees was named managing partner of West, a venture studio which works with purpose-driven companies to find and reach their ideal markets. Rees has served as Chairman of West since 2023.
