= Dennis Herrera =

American attorney (born 1962)

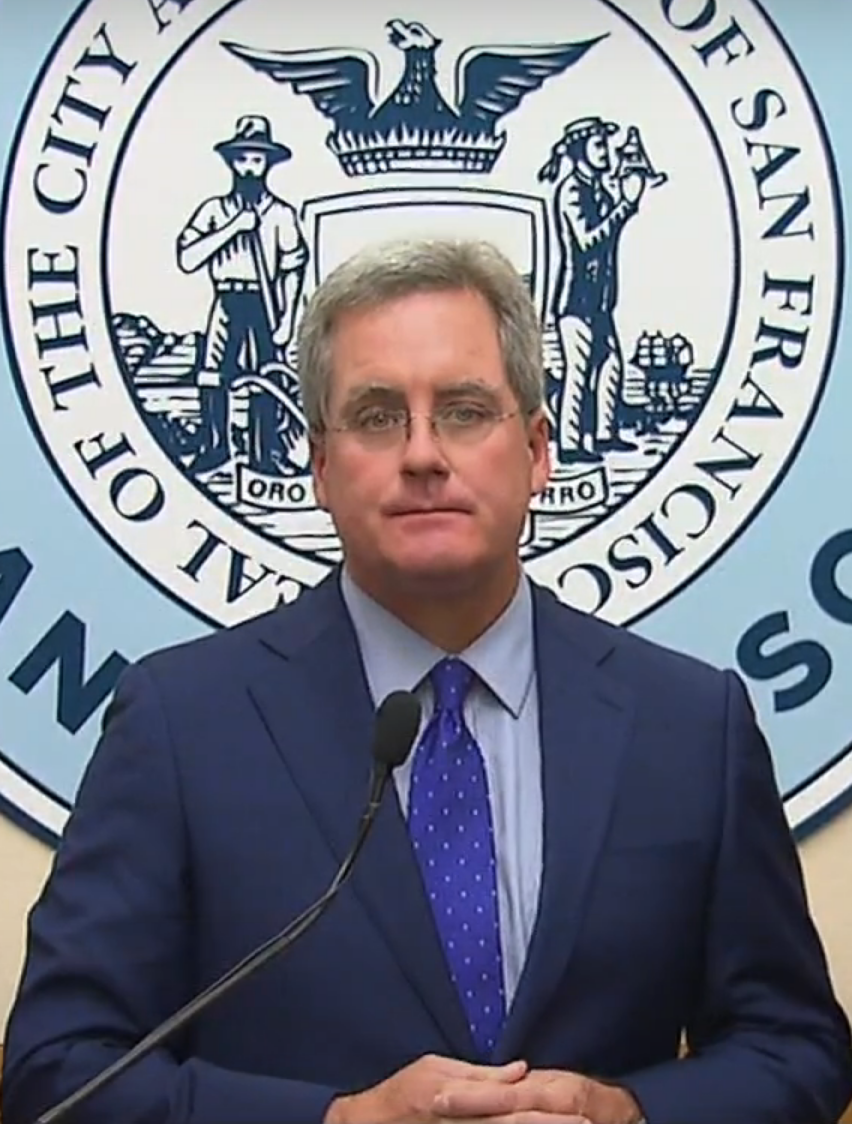

General Manager of the San Francisco Public Utilities Commission
- Incumbent
- Assumed office November 1, 2021
- Preceded by: Michael Carlin (acting, following Harlan Kelly's resignation)

City Attorney of San Francisco
- In office January 8, 2002 – November 1, 2021
- Preceded by: Louise Renne
- Succeeded by: David Chiu

Personal details
- Party: Democratic
- Spouse: Anne Herrera (m. 1998)
- Children: 1
- Education: Villanova University (BA); George Washington University (JD)

Dennis J. Herrera is an American attorney. He previously served as City Attorney of San Francisco from 2002 until 2021. During his tenure, he was known to advocate for same-sex marriage in California, including the In re Marriage Cases, 43 Cal.4th 757 (2008), and Hollingsworth v. Perry, 570. U.S. (2013), as well as the legal fight against Proposition 8. Afterward, he served as the general manager for the San Francisco Public Utilities Commission.

He ran unsuccessfully for Mayor of San Francisco in the 2011 election, finishing third in the City's ranked-choice voting system.

== Early life and education ==
Born November 6, 1962 in Bay Shore, Long Island, New York, Herrera grew up in the nearby middle class community of Glen Cove. His father was a psychiatrist who immigrated from Colombia after serving as part of a UN Peacekeeping force during the Suez War of 1956. His mother is the child of Italian immigrants and worked as a nurse in Glen Cove.

Herrera earned his bachelor's degree from Villanova University in Pennsylvania, and his Juris Doctor from the George Washington University Law School in Washington, D.C. Herrera worked various jobs to support himself during his education, from his newspaper route as a young boy, to restocking shelves at the local grocery store, to serving as a short order cook in a local diner. Upon graduating from law school in 1987, Herrera was offered an associate position at a maritime law firm in San Francisco and moved to the city.

== Political career ==
After his move to San Francisco, Herrera joined his local Democratic club and helped to get Democratic candidates elected in the city. In 1990, he was appointed to the Waterfront Plan Advisory Board, and later served on the Finance Committee for the California Democratic Party.

In 1993 Herrera was appointed to the U.S. Maritime Administration in Washington, D.C. during President Clinton's Administration. He returned to private practice in San Francisco as a partner in the maritime law firm of Kelly, Gill, Sherburne & Herrera.

Then-Mayor Willie Brown appointed Herrera to the SF Transportation Commission, and later to the San Francisco Police Commission. Herrera was voted the President of the Police Commission after just one year of service.

== San Francisco City Attorney ==
In December 2001, Herrera was elected San Francisco City Attorney, becoming the first Latino to hold the office. He was re-elected in 2005, 2009, 2013, 2015 and 2019.

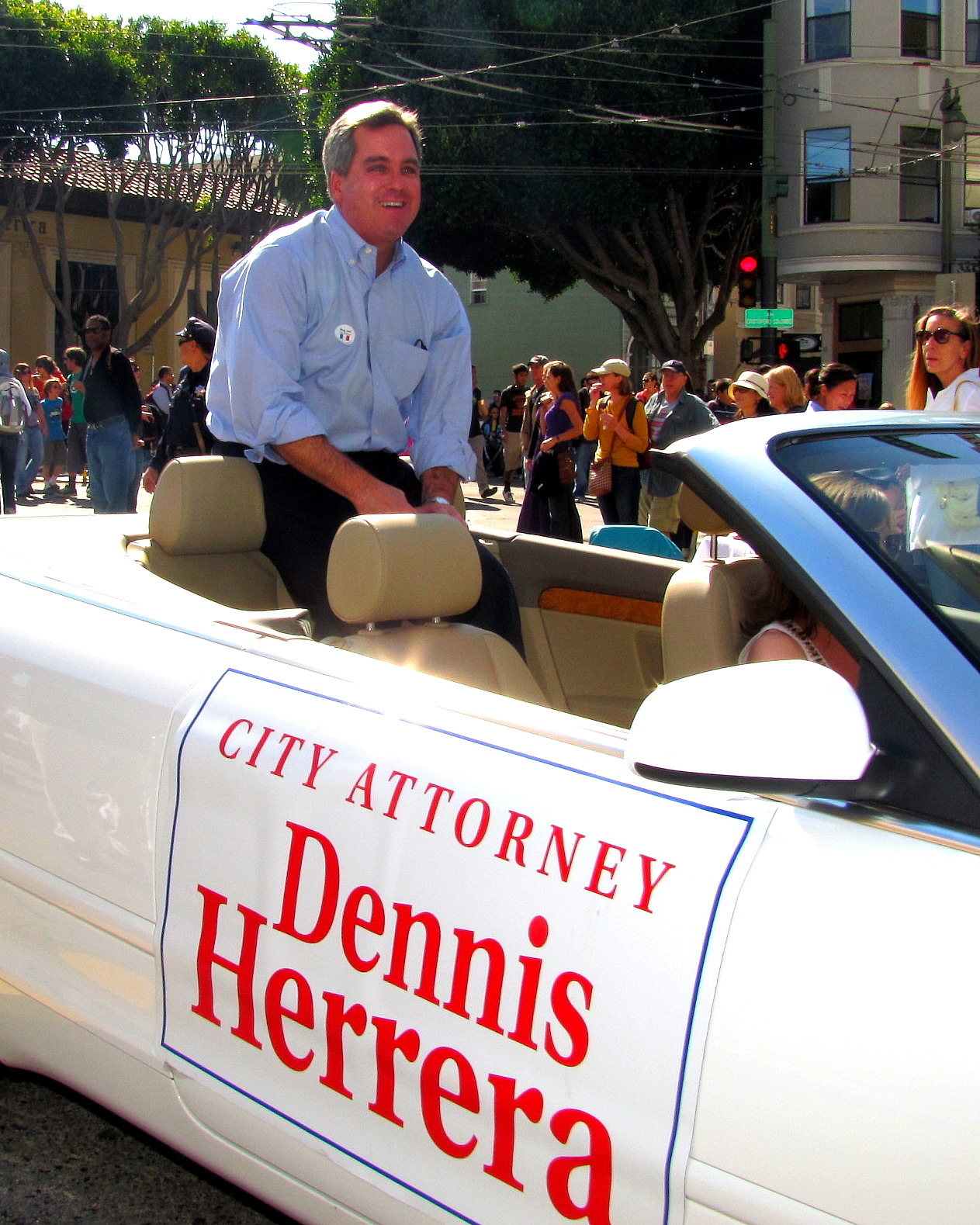
Herrera at the 2011 Columbus Day Italian Heritage Parade

=== Sanctuary cities ===
On January 31, 2017 Herrera brought the first lawsuit in the nation against President Donald Trump over his executive order threatening to withhold billions of dollars in federal funding from sanctuary cities and other local and state governments.

Herrera's federal lawsuit alleges that the executive order is unconstitutional and exceeds the president's power. The trial court ruled in San Francisco's favor, finding Trump's executive order unconstitutional and ordering a nationwide halt to enforcement of it. The federal government appealed that ruling. The Ninth Circuit Court of Appeals on August 1, 2018 upheld the district court's ruling on the merits in favor of San Francisco, finding that the executive order violates the Constitution's separation-of-powers guarantee, which reserves legislative and spending authority to Congress, not the president.

Herrera on August 11, 2017 filed a second lawsuit against the Trump administration, this one seeking to invalidate new grant conditions that U.S. Attorney General Jefferson B. Sessions III sought to place on a group of U.S. Department of Justice grants for local law enforcement. Those grant conditions were issued after the district court had issued a preliminary injunction in April 2017 that halted enforcement of the sanctuary executive order as the case proceeded.

=== Climate change ===
Herrera on September 19, 2017 sued the top five investor-owned fossil fuel companies seeking billions of dollars for infrastructure needed to protect San Francisco against sea-level rise caused by global warming from their products. At a March 2018 climate change tutorial requested by the judge, the fossil fuel companies were compelled to acknowledge that the science of global warming is no longer in dispute.

=== Uber and Lyft ===
In 2017 and 2018, Herrera launched investigations into Uber and Lyft over driver pay and benefits, accessibility, discrimination, public safety issues and potential violations of other state and local laws.

=== Equifax ===
On September 26, 2017, San Francisco became the first city in the country to sue Equifax for failing to protect the personal data of more than 15 million Californians, part of a data breach that compromised the personal information of 143 million U.S. consumers.

=== Hertz ===
Herrera sued the rental car company and its affiliate on March 2, 2017 for charging drivers hidden fees when they cross the Golden Gate Bridge.

=== Housing ===
Herrera successfully defended San Francisco's short-term rental regulations from legal challenge by Airbnb and HomeAway and secured a settlement in May 2017 that requires the companies to ensure that listings on their site comply with San Francisco law, protecting rent-controlled apartments from being used as de facto hotels.

In May 2017, Herrera secured a court victory that got tenant evictions voided and $5.4 million in court awards against abusive landlord Anne Kihagi, had worked to force tenants from their rent-controlled homes so she could charge more money.

On August 16, 2006, Herrera sued CitiApartments for unlawful business and tenant harassment practices, which forced out rent-controlled tenants to allow higher rents to be charged for the same units. The subsequent settlement, with penalties up to $10 million, put the company out of business.

In 2021, Herrera sued a developer who had built 29 apartments in a lot that San Francisco's zoning regulations specified could only have 10 apartments. Herrera's lawsuit happened amid a severe housing shortage and homelessness crisis in San Francisco.

=== Bail reform ===
Herrera declared in November 2016 that the state's current cash bail system is unconstitutional and refused to defend it in a federal class-action lawsuit brought by a national civil rights group against San Francisco's sheriff. This led to a legislative drive to reform the state's system where the only factor in deciding whether an inmate is freed prior to appearing before a judge is if they can pay the amount on the bail schedule.

=== Academy of Art University ===
In December 2016, Herrera reached a settlement with Academy of Art University valued at more than $60 million in cash and property to house low-income seniors. The for-profit academy for years had violated state and local laws in its aggressive acquisition and use of vast real estate holdings in San Francisco.

=== Gun control litigation ===
Herrera has been involved in a number of high-profile cases against the National Rifle Association and other gun rights advocates, both to defend San Francisco's gun control measures and to challenge gun industry practices. He also filed lawsuits in 2013 and 2017 against several companies for flouting state and local law by selling complete but disassembled large-capacity gun magazines as "repair kits." He secured settlements ending sales to customers in California of these devices.

=== City College of San Francisco ===
Herrera sued the accrediting agency that was trying to close City College of San Francisco on August 22, 2013. He won preliminary injunction motion that halted the termination action and secured injunctions to protect City College's rights in the evaluation process.

=== Art Institute of California ===
Herrera investigated the Art Institute of California's marketing practices that underestimated student costs and inflated job placement figures, resulting in a settlement in 2014 that included a $1.95 million payment to San Francisco, endowing a $1.6 million scholarship fund for students who wished to return to finish their studies and offering $850,000 in general scholarships to new students.

=== Health care ===
Herrera sued Blue Cross and Health Net in 2011, alleging that these insurance companies systematically underpaid San Francisco General Hospital and other public hospitals for emergency services provided to their policy-holders. He reached a $6.25 million settlement for past claims and an agreement to reimburse at a higher rate for at least three years going forward.

When the Healthy San Francisco Initiative became law in 2006, establishing universal health care in the City, Herrera successfully defended the law's constitutionality against legal challenge. When some of the fees earmarked for the initiative were misappropriated by San Francisco restaurants, he convinced some of the restaurants to participate in a voluntary settlement program that recovered $844,000 for their employees.

=== Nevada "patient dumping" ===
After The Sacramento Bee discovered that mental patients in Nevada were being bused to various California cities without any supervision or plan for what they would do upon arrival, Herrera opened an investigation that found that dozens of these patients had been shipped to San Francisco. Herrera brought a class-action lawsuit against Nevada in 2013 that was settled in 2015 with Nevada agreeing to provide travel assistance to California only for patients who meet appropriate criteria, ensuring that the patients are returning to a home address or to a medical facility or program, and that they will be received or accompanied by a responsible individual. Nevada also agreed to provide San Francisco with semi-annual reports about these patients with information that includes the date of discharge, destination city, and name of individuals at any medical facility that has agreed to receive the patient. Nevada also agreed to pay San Francisco $400,000.

=== Marriage equality for same-sex couples ===
Herrera has been involved in every phase of the legal fight for marriage equality for same-sex couples in California.

In 2009, he joined the City of San Francisco as a plaintiff in the case of Perry v. Schwarzenegger, seeking to overturn the state's ban on same-sex marriage, the first time any government entity had sued to challenge marriage laws discriminating against gay and lesbian couples. Los Angeles City Attorney Rocky Delgadillo and Santa Clara County Counsel Ann M. Ravel would also join their jurisdictions as plaintiffs in the suit.

In San Francisco's petition to the California Supreme Court, Herrera said: "The issue before the court today is of far greater consequence than marriage equality alone ... Equal protection of the laws is not merely the cornerstone of the California Constitution, it is what separates constitutional democracy from mob rule tyranny. If allowed to stand, Prop 8 so devastates the principle of equal protection that it endangers the fundamental rights of any potential electoral minority—even for protected classes based on race, religion, national origin and gender. The proponents of Prop 8 waged a ruthless campaign of falsehood and fear, funded by millions of dollars from out-of-state interest groups. Make no mistake that their success in California has dramatically raised the stakes. What began as a struggle for marriage equality is today a fight for equality itself. I am confident that our high court will again demonstrate its principled independence in recognizing this danger, and in reasserting our constitution's promise of equality under the law."

Proposition 8 was eventually held to violate the United States Constitution by federal district court judge Vaughn R. Walker on August 4, 2010, a decision that was left intact by the United States Supreme Court on June 26, 2013. Same-sex marriages began again in California two days later.

=== Payday lenders ===
After filing litigation against predatory payday lenders Money Mart and Check 'n Go on April 26, 2007, Herrera forced them to repay 10,000 California consumers $7.7 million and forgive another $8 million in debt.

=== Arbitration providers ===
On March 24, 2008, Herrera filed a lawsuit against the National Arbitration Forum and two other arbitration providers, alleging that the defendants were not neutral as they claimed in arbitration disputes between credit card companies and their customers, but were instead heavily biased in favor of lenders, calling NAF "little more than a collection agent masquerading as a neutral party." He alleged that NAF's records showed that consumers prevailed in just 0.2% of arbitration cases that went to a hearing.

=== Wrongful termination lawsuit ===
While City Attorney, he lost the wrongful termination lawsuit brought by Joanne Hoeper, costing the taxpayers of the City and County of San Francisco millions of dollars. Hoeper, a 20-year veteran in the SF City Attorney's Office, claimed that her termination was retaliation for identifying improper approval of payments to plumbing contractors for unnecessary sewer repair work.

=== SFUSD's failure to focus on reopening ===
On February 3, 2021 during the COVID-19 pandemic, Herrera sued the San Francisco Unified School District and Superintendent Vincent Matthews for violating state law by not having a plan to "offer classroom-based instruction whenever possible." At the time, public health rules had allowed schools to be open for months, and private schools in San Francisco had safely returned students to the classroom months earlier with no major outbreaks. Public schools, however, had remained closed, with no clear timeline to re-open. The school district is independent from the jurisdiction of the city. The lawsuit was the first of its kind, wherein a civil action is filed by a city against its school district over COVID-19 school closures within the state of California. The suit was supported by Mayor London Breed, who has criticized the Board for focusing on renaming 44 empty SFUSD schools during the pandemic rather than focusing on reopening. Both the Board and Matthews criticized the suit, calling it wasteful and inaccurate.

== San Francisco Public Utilities Commission ==
In late 2020, Harlan Kelly, general manager of the San Francisco Public Utilities Commission (SFPUC), was charged with wire fraud, forced to surrender his passport and undergo drug testing. In April 2021, Mayor London Breed nominated Herrera to be the next General Manager. At the time of the nomination, Herrera stated that this move was "putting the city's top watchdog at the head of the PUC."

In September 2021, Herrera, in a unanimous vote, was appointed general manager of the SFPUC. State Assemblyman David Chiu was subsequently appointed as City Attorney by Breed to replace Herrera.

== Sources ==
- Whiting, Sam (February 12, 2009). "Catching Up With ... Dennis Herrera". San Francisco Chronicle.
- Buchanan, Wyatt; Marisa Lagos (June 18, 2007). "City Attorney moves to remove Ed Jew from office -- seeks permission to sue from AG". San Francisco Chronicle. Archived from the original on June 20, 2007.
- "The Rachel Maddow Show". NBC News. March 5, 2009.
- Whiting, Sam (April 18, 2004). "Dennis Herrera uses his power of attorney". San Francisco Chronicle.
- Nevius, C.W. (November 22, 2008). "City attorney Herrera has a new mayoral look". San Francisco Chronicle.
- Kostal, Susan (March 4, 2008). "The other man". San Francisco Magazine.
- Keeling, Brock (November 5, 2008). "SF City Attorney Dennis Herrera Sues to Invalidate Prop. 8". SFist. Archived from the original on November 14, 2009.
