= Terry Baum =

American playwright

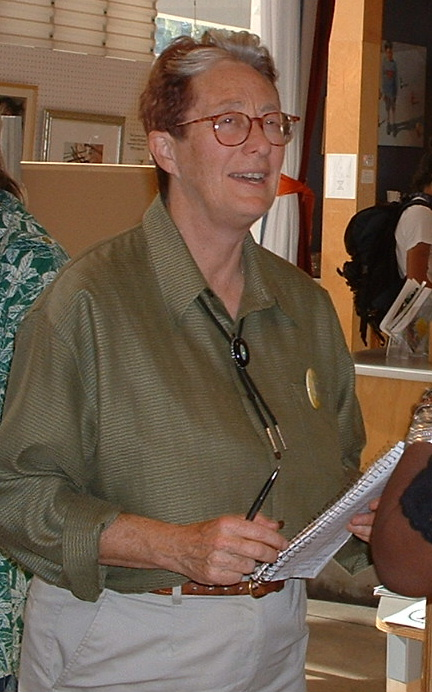
Terry Baum during her 2004 congressional campaign.

Terry Joan Baum (born 1946) is an American feminist playwright, known for her treatment of lesbian experience.

== Biography ==
In 1970, Baum worked as a personal aide to Bella Abzug in her Congressional campaign. In 1972, at the University of California, Santa Barbara graduate school, Baum founded the Isla Vista Community Theater. She founded Lilith, a San Francisco women's theater collective, in 1974.

Her comedy revue Dos Lesbos, written with Carolyn Myers, opened in Ollie's bar in Oakland, California in 1981. It ran for two years in the San Francisco Bay Area and Santa Cruz, California, and was anthologised in the Places, Please (1985), the pioneering anthology of lesbian plays, edited by Kate McDermott.

From 1985 to 1994, she lived some of the time in Amsterdam. In 2004 Baum ran for Congress against Nancy Pelosi as a write-in candidate, after losing a legal battle to be listed on the ballot. She subsequently wrote a play about the experience, Baum for Peace. In 2011 she stood for the Green Party in the San Francisco mayoral election, coming 11th with under 1% of the vote.

In July, 2014 in San Francisco, Baum opened a solo show, HICK: A Love Story, The Romance of Lorena Hickok and Eleanor Roosevelt. Co-written by Baum and Pat Bond, HICK was about the love affair between first lady Eleanor Roosevelt and the journalist Lorena Hickok. It was based on the 2336 letters Roosevelt had written to Hickok, her friend and confidante. After a much-lauded San Francisco run, HICK played in the New York International Fringe Festival where it earned "Fringe Fave" and was selected by the Fringe Encore Series to have a run in an off-Broadway theatre.

== Works ==
- Dos Lesbos, a Play By, For and About Perverts, was first staged in 1981. Published in Places, Please, 1985
- Immediate Family, first staged at the First Women's Theater Festival in Santa Cruz, 1983
- One Fool or How I Learned to Stop Worrying and Love the Dutch, published in Tough Acts to Follow, 1990.
- Two Fools, published in Intimate Acts, 1997.
- This is My Peace Sign, 2003. (Self-published book of photos from San Francisco anti-war demonstrations.)
- HICK: A Love Story, The Romance of Lorena Hickok and Eleanor Roosevelt
