= Night Cabbie =

Newspaper column

Logo used for the column Night Cabbie.

The Night Cabbie is a newspaper column that ran in the San Francisco Examiner and later the San Francisco Chronicle on and off from August 19, 1996, through December 27, 2004, under a trademark logo of a man peering into a car rear view mirror that highlighted the author's anonymity. The term is also the pen name of the anonymous columnist.

The Night Cabbie portrays the firsthand experiences of a cab driver who worked late night in San Francisco, California until his retirement at the end of 2004. Each column typically comprised several vignettes of his "fares" (customers), who ranged from sex workers and homeless people to politicians and socialites. He frequently described his experiences with local police, restaurants, and hotel concierges. Throughout his columns he maintained a gritty, film noir-style attitude, describing murders, graft, and corruption without elaboration or editorial commentary.

Not much was publicly known about the Night Cabbie's past or identity. In his columns he hinted that he had been a successful businessman and was familiar with finance, something that gave him a cynical perspective on passengers who considered themselves smarter or more sophisticated than he was. He once revealed he had earned a master's degree in economics from San Francisco State University. In an interview with his former editor Phil Bronstein, the Night Cabbie hinted that he may be willing to reveal his identity at some point in the future.

He retired, according to his last column, out of disenchantment over his low pay and local politics as it affected taxi drivers.

Emil Lawrence, candidate for mayor of San Francisco in the election of 2011, identified himself as the Night Cabbie. Lawrence came in 15th of 16 candidates, receiving 0.20% of the vote. Emil Lawrence was not born in Shanghai, China, and is not related to Zharoff as Wilipedia has claimed. A rabbi named Cyril L., who claims to be related to him put this false narrative here. Cyril L. is an attorney one would never hire...
