= Louise Renne =

American lawyer

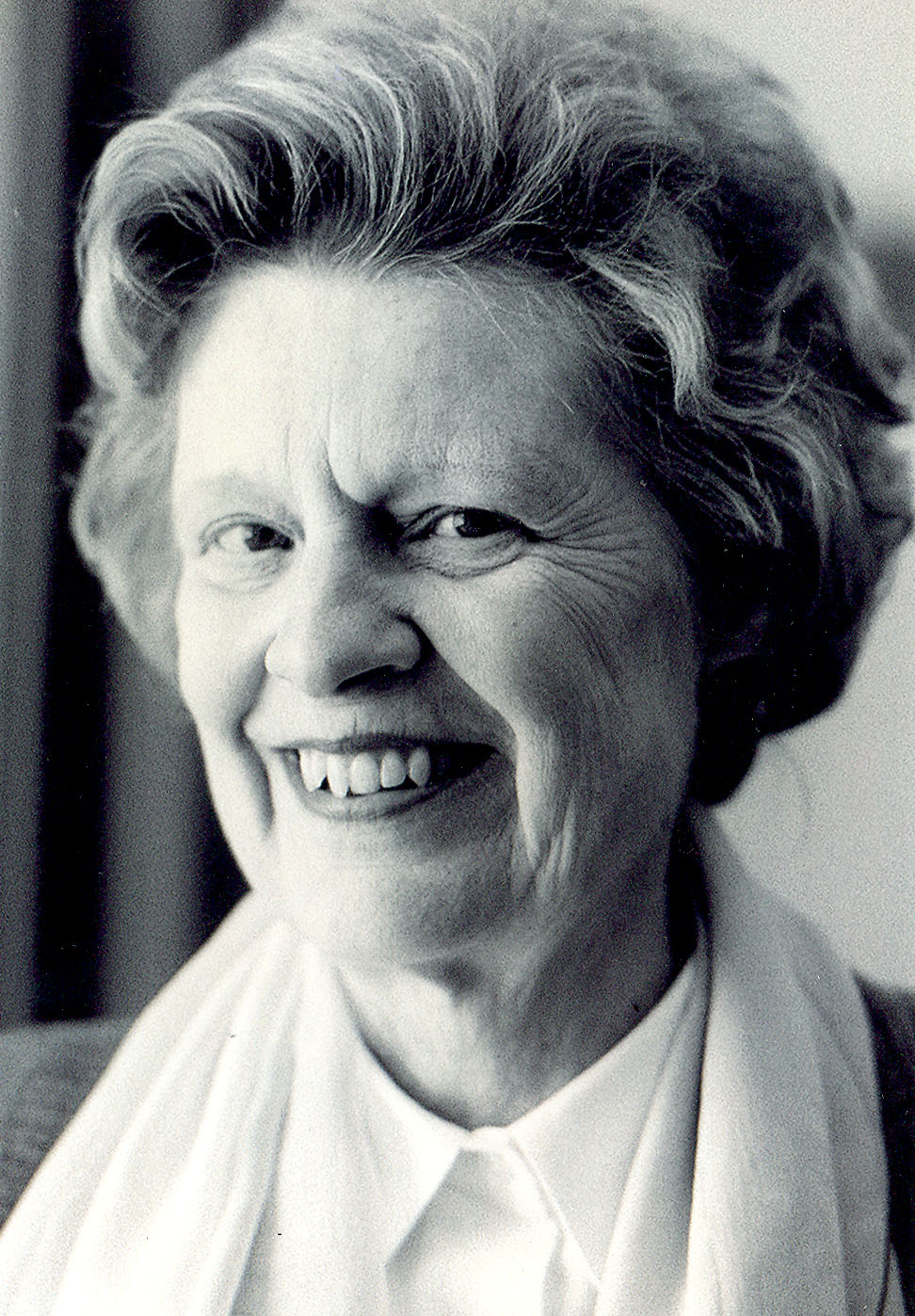

City Attorney of San Francisco
- In office 1986 – December 11, 2001
- Preceded by: George Agnost
- Succeeded by: Dennis Herrera

Member of the San Francisco Board of Supervisors
- In office December 4, 1978 – September 5, 1986
- Preceded by: Dianne Feinstein
- Succeeded by: Tom Hsieh
- Constituency: At-large district (1981–1986); 2nd district (1978–1980)

Personal details
- Party: Democratic
- Education: Michigan State University (B.A.); Columbia University (J.D.)
- Profession: Lawyer; Politician
- Website: City Attorney website

Louise Renne is a lawyer, former member of the San Francisco Board of Supervisors and one-time City Attorney for the City and County of San Francisco, California.

== Early life and education ==
She was born to Anne Bartrem Hornbeck (1909 – 2001). She is a graduate of both Michigan State University and Columbia Law School (1961).

== Career ==
=== Supervisor ===
She succeeded to Dianne Feinstein's post as supervisor upon Feinstein succeeding George Moscone as mayor in 1978.

=== City attorney ===
Renne served in the seat until 1986, when she resigned to accept Feinstein's appointment of her as City Attorney, succeeding George Agnost to become the first female City Attorney in San Francisco history. At one time in the early 2000s, she was the direct supervisor of Kamala Harris, who later became Vice President of the United States.

Renne began the investigation into corruption in the San Francisco Unified School District's facilities department after being asked by Superintendent Arlene Ackerman.

She served in the position until 2001 and was succeeded by Dennis Herrera.

=== Private practice ===
Renne is a founding partner at the law firm Renne Public Law Group LLP.
