= Percy V. Long =

American lawyer (1870–1953)

Long c. 1904

Percy V. Long (March 26, 1870 – October 28, 1953) was the City Attorney of San Francisco for two periods, first from 1902 to 1906, and then from 1908 to 1916.

== Early life, education, and career ==
Born in Sonora, California into a pioneer California family, Long graduated from the Haywards public school in 1885, and from Oakland High School in 1890. Immediately after completing high school, he began reading law. In the 1890s, he served as an officer of the Native Sons of the Golden West, and served as the Deputy Clerk of the Supreme Court of California. Long also became a member and officer of the bicycling organization, the League of American Wheelmen, and in 1897, was sent to Sacramento to lobby the state legislature to pass a bill classifying bicycles as luggage so that they could be transported on trains at no extra charge.

== Political and legal career ==
In September 1900, Long won the Republican nomination for Justice of the Peace, taking his bid to the convention floor to overcome a last-minute effort by party bosses to place a different name in nomination as part of a larger political deal. He won the general election handily in November 1900. Long was scheduled to take office in January 1901, but in December 1900, Governor Henry Gage asserted that he had the right to appoint the position, and appointed Long to his seat early.

Long became prominent as an attorney in San Francisco, where he served as city attorney and in the legal department of the National Board of Fire Underwriters. During his service as city attorney, Long hired George Lull as an assistant in his office in 1908. Lull would go on to succeed Long in that office. Towards the end of his service as city attorney, Long was "mentioned as a possible mayoralty aspirant", but did not become a candidate.

A Progressive Republican, Long was one of the directors of the 1924 United States presidential election campaign of Calvin Coolidge for President of the United States, denouncing efforts by the third-party candidacy of Robert M. La Follette to invoke Theodore Roosevelt as a model, which Long characterized as intended to cover up "the radical character of the La Follette campaign". In 1936, Long published a book, The Story of the Constitution.

== Personal life and death ==
Long married Emma B. Sexton of San Jose, California on May 30, 1900.

Long died in San Francisco, at the home of his daughter, at the age of 83.

Political offices
Preceded by Franklin Knight Lane; William J. Burke	City Attorney of San Francisco; 1902–1906; 1908–1916	Succeeded by William J. Burke; George Lull
