= 1983 San Francisco mayoral recall election =

- April 26, 1983
- Shall Dianne Feinstein be recalled from the office of Mayor?

Results
Choice	Votes	%
Yes	30,166	18.31%
No	134,591	81.69%
Valid votes	164,757	100.00%
Invalid or blank votes	0	0.00%
Total votes	164,757	100.00%
Registered voters/turnout	354,104	46.53%
Mayor before election
Dianne Feinstein
Democratic
Mayor after election
Dianne Feinstein
Democratic

The 1983 San Francisco mayoral recall election was held on April 26, 1983, to determine whether mayor Dianne Feinstein should be removed from office. The recall measure was overwhelmingly defeated, and Feinstein remained in office.

== Background ==
In 1983, Feinstein passed a handgun ban (later overturned by the state court of appeals). This angered the far-left White Panther Party, who then organized a successful effort to force a recall election against Feinstein. The White Panther Party's efforts to collect signatures were aided by recent anger (particularly in the city's gay community) over Feinstein's veto of legislation which would have extended city-employee benefits to domestic partners.

== Campaign ==
Feinstein was considered to be a popular mayor. By the time of election day, Feinstein's victory was seen as a foregone conclusion.

Feinstein's campaign had organized a very successful effort to encourage voters to use absentee ballots, and distributed absentee ballots to voters ahead of the election.

Despite some disapproval of Feinstein among the gay community, they did not heavily support recalling Feinstein.

== Results ==
Feinstein only lost a single precinct out of the city's 710 voting precincts. The precinct she failed to win (which was the home district of the White Panther Party which had organized the effort to recall Feinstein) saw her lose by only a single vote.

San Francisco mayoral recall election, 1983
Candidate	Votes	%
No	134,591	81.69%
Yes	30,166	18.31%
Total votes	164,757	100
