= Thomas Martin O'Connor =

American lawyer

Thomas Martin O'Connor (1913 – July 26, 1998) was an American lawyer who served as City Attorney of San Francisco from 1961 until he retired in 1977.
