= George Agnost =

American lawyer

City Attorney of San Francisco
- In office 1976 – August 3, 1986
- Preceded by: Thomas Martin O'Connor
- Succeeded by: Philip Ward

Personal details
- Born: October 21, 1922 Omaha, Nebraska, U.S.
- Died: August 3, 1986 (aged 63)
- Education: Stanford Law School

Military service
- Allegiance: United States
- Branch/service: United States Air Force
- Rank: Captain
- Commands: Fifteenth Air Force

George Agnost (October 21, 1922 – August 3, 1986) was the city attorney of San Francisco from 1977 until his death in 1986.

== Early life ==
Agnost was born in Omaha, Nebraska, to Greek parents. He had a brother named Frank, and sisters named Engenia and Joan. In 1929, the family moved to San Francisco and his father owned a restaurant on Mason Street.

Agnost studied at San Francisco's Hawthorne Elementary School, Horace Mann Junior High School, and Commerce High School. He later spent two years at University of California, Berkeley.

== Military career ==
During World War II, Agnost served as a captain with the Fifteenth Air Force. He flew 35 missions in Italy as a nose gunner on a Consolidated B-24 Liberator.

Following the war, he studied at Stanford Law School and graduated in 1950.

== Legal career ==
In 1953, Agnost joined the San Francisco District Attorney's Office as a deputy attorney. He became chief deputy trial attorney in 1976.

In 1977, Agnost campaigned to become City Attorney of San Francisco, promising to modernize the role and "make it the best in the state". Agnost won with 51.1% (82,431 votes), while his opponents Jim Reilly and Gil Graham received 24.7% (39,846) and 24.1% (39,015) respectively. He was elected in 1981.

In November 1985, he was re-elected into the position after running unopposed.

== Personal life ==
Agnost separated from his wife Carol before November 1977. They had a daughter named Victoria. He later married a woman named Rosa.

He was a member of the Commonwealth Club of California and the Olympic Club.

In October 1985, Agnost underwent an open-heart surgery.

On August 3, 1986, Agnost died at the UCSF Medical Center after a cardiac arrest. Upon his death, Deputy City Attorney Phil Ward was named acting city attorney.

Legal offices
Preceded by Thomas Martin O'Connor	City Attorney of San Francisco; 1977	Succeeded by Philip Ward
