= Quentin L. Kopp =

American politician

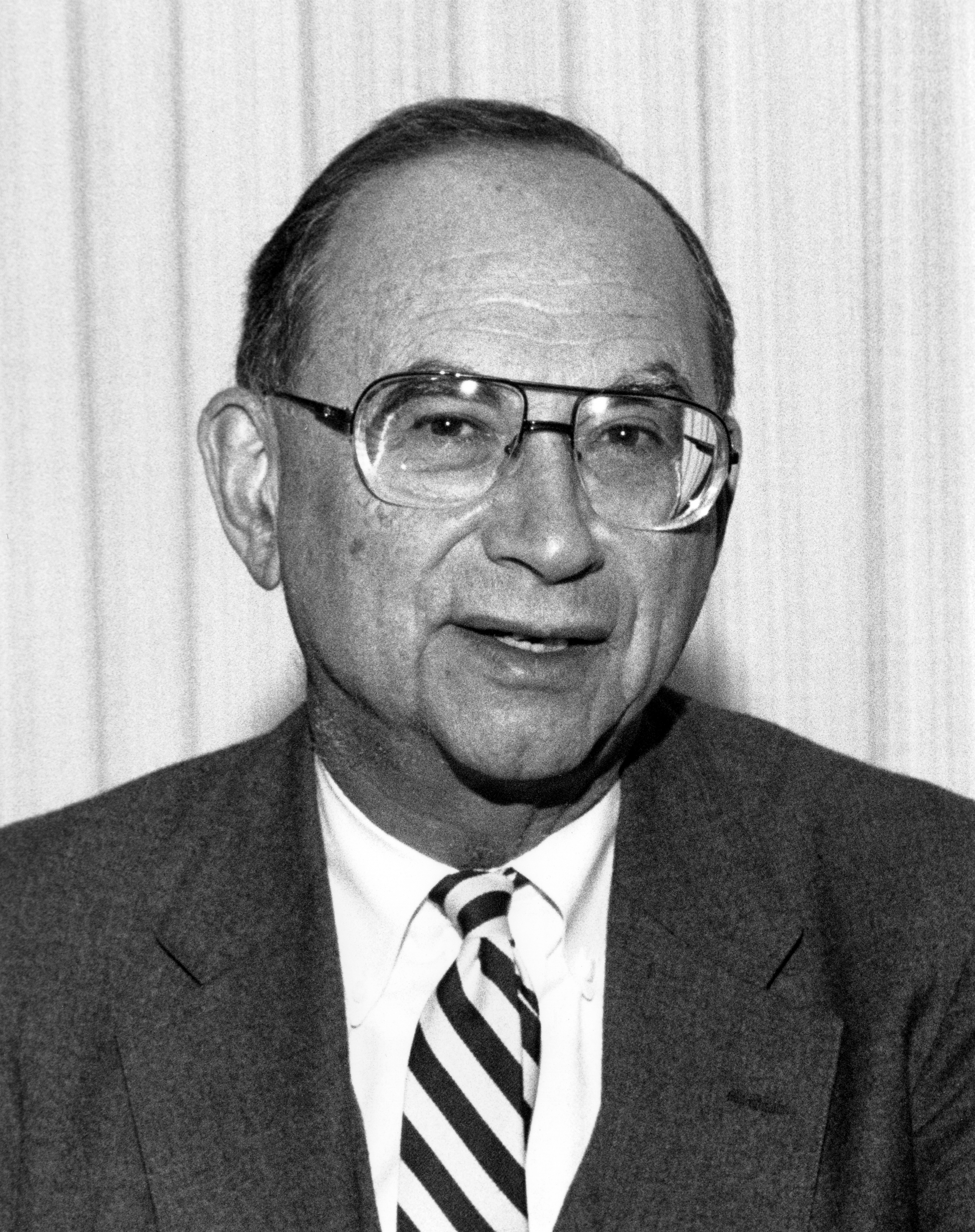
- Official portrait, 1994

Member of the California Senate from the 8th district
- In office December 1, 1986 – November 30, 1998
- Preceded by: John Francis Foran
- Succeeded by: Jackie Speier

Member of the San Francisco Board of Supervisors
- In office January 8, 1972 – November 30, 1986
- Preceded by: James Mailliard
- Succeeded by: Jim Gonzalez
- Constituency: At-large district (1972–1978); 10th district (1978–1981); At-large district (1981–1986)

Personal details
- Born: August 11, 1928 (age 97) Syracuse, New York, U.S.
- Party: Independent
- Spouse: Mara Sikaters
- Children: 3
- Education: Dartmouth College (BA); Harvard University (JD)

Military service
- Branch/service: United States Air Force
- Years of service: 1952–1954
- Battles/wars: Korean War

Quentin Lewis Kopp (born August 11, 1928) is an American attorney and politician. He served as a member of the San Francisco Board of Supervisors and in the California State Senate. Kopp ran unsuccessfully for mayor of San Francisco in 1979 against Dianne Feinstein. Kopp advocated for the extension of BART to SFO which was completed in 2003.

== Early life and education ==
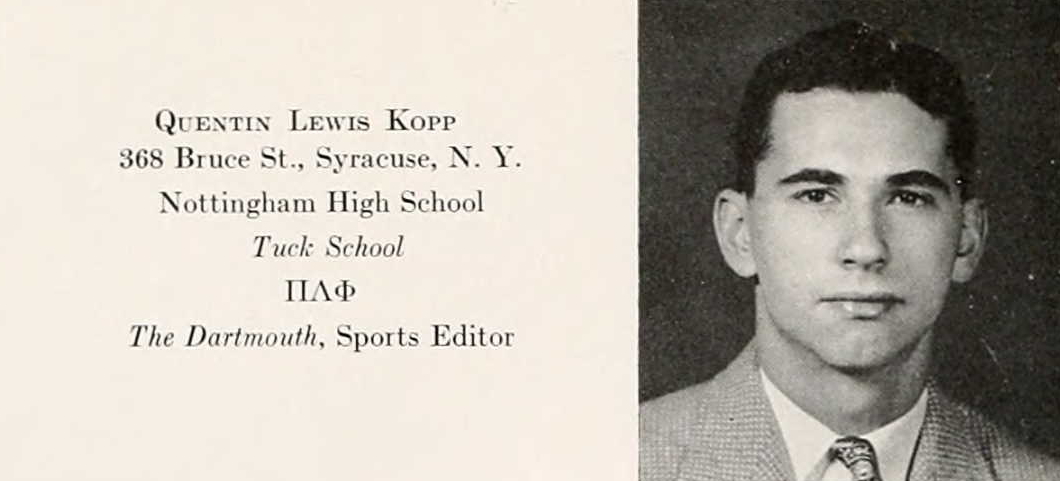
Kopp in the Dartmouth College yearbook, 1949

Kopp was born in 1928 in Syracuse, New York. He earned a Bachelor of Arts degree from Dartmouth College in 1949 and a Juris Doctor from Harvard Law School in 1952.

== Career ==
After graduating from law school, Kopp joined the United States Air Force and was stationed at the McClellan Air Force Base during the Korean War. During his military service, Kopp was assigned to the United States Air Force Office of Special Investigations and United States Air Force Judge Advocate General's Corps. After his discharge from the Air Force in 1954, he worked as an attorney for the Waterfront Commission of New York Harbor. He joined Pillsbury, Madison & Sutro in 1955 and established his own practice in 1958.

=== San Francisco politics ===
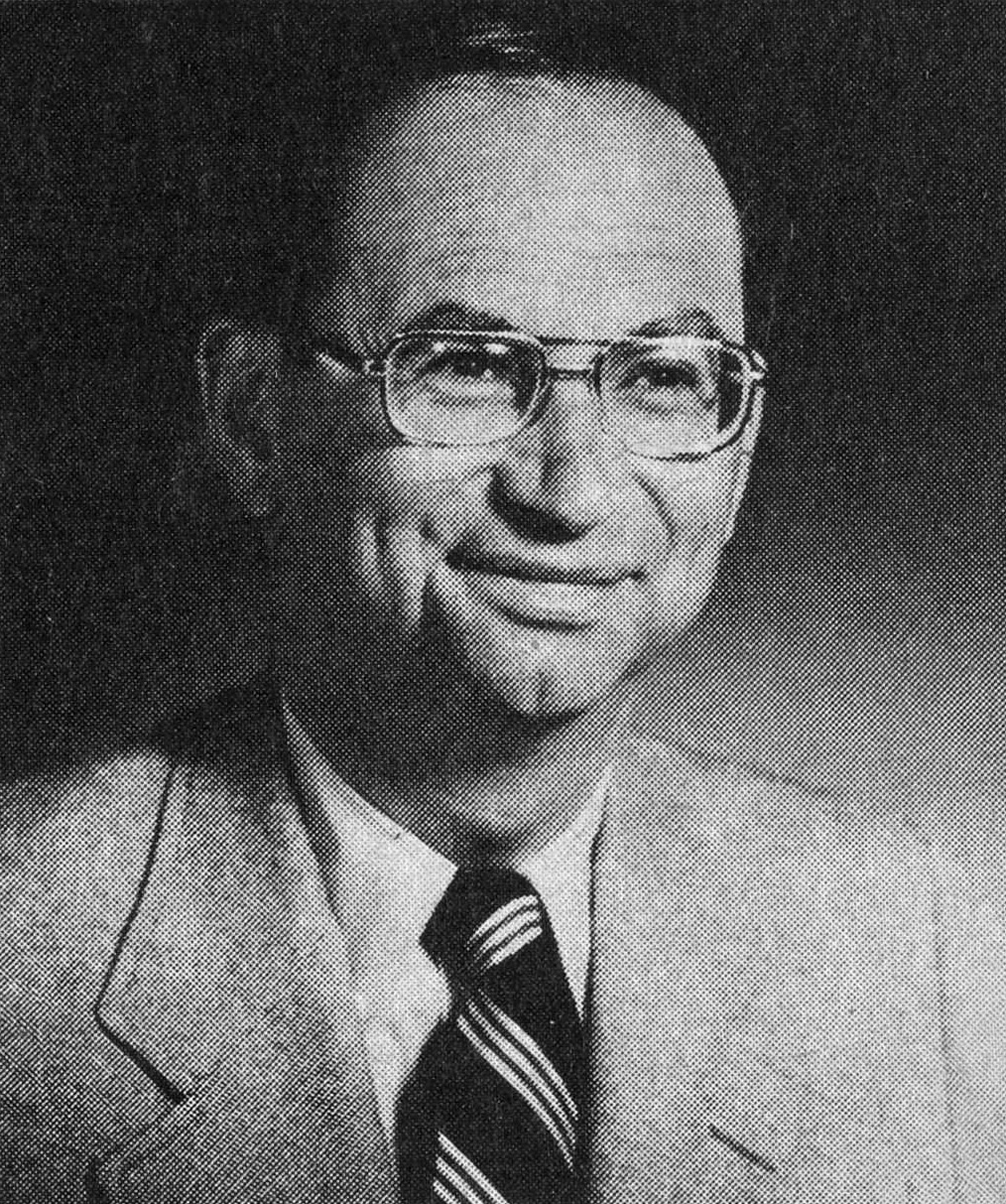
Kopp in 1982, while serving as a member of the San Francisco Board of Supervisors.

Kopp was elected to the San Francisco Board of Supervisors in 1971 and served until 1986, representing the West Portal neighborhood. In 1979, Kopp ran for mayor against Dianne Feinstein, but lost in a runoff election. This election also featured Jello Biafra (singer for the punk band Dead Kennedys). In 1986, Kopp ran for California State Senate as an independent in a heavily Democratic district straddling southern San Francisco and northern San Mateo counties. Republican distaste for the Democratic nominee (then Assemblyman Lou Papan) led them to financially support Kopp, who went on to win by one percentage point. He won reelection in 1990 and 1994. Term limits prevented Kopp from seeking reelection in 1998. In 1998, Republican then-Governor Pete Wilson appointed Kopp to a judgeship in San Mateo County. He served in that capacity until his retirement in 2004.

=== California State Senate ===
During his time in the California State Senate and afterward, Kopp, together with Mike Nevin, helped push through the BART extension to San Francisco International Airport with an airport station. In 1994, Kopp qualified an advisory ballot measure in San Francisco, Measure I, which advocated for a station inside the International Terminal. (Opponents qualified Proposition H, which advocated for "select a site for the airport BART station that would be most cost-effective, convenient, and safe. In the public discussion of the measure it was recognized that this was intended to favor a multimodal transit hub on the west side of Highway 101 about a half-mile from the airport.) The passage of Measure I and subsequent decisions of the BART board resulted in the BART extension being built as a triangle, with the vertices being the San Bruno station at Tanforan Shopping Center, and not on the Caltrain Right-of-Way, Millbrae (Caltrain terminal) and SFO International Terminal. To get to all the stations on the extension, the BART train has to reverse at least once. The alternative rejected by Kopp was single station at San Bruno, California where the SFO People mover, BART and Caltrain would share a common station. The extension of the SFO People Mover across to the station was to be paid for as part of the traffic mitigation for the new international terminal.

=== California High Speed Rail Authority ===
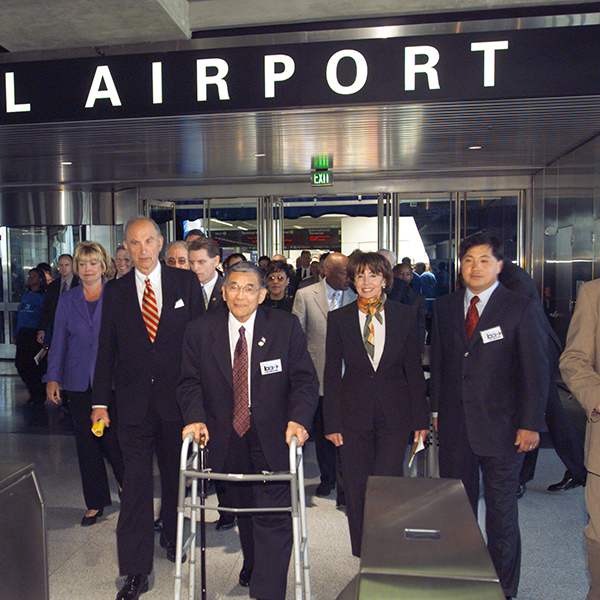
Dignitaries at the opening of the San Francisco International Airport BART station in June 2003. Left to right: Representative Ellen Tauscher, Judge Quentin L. Kopp, Secretary of Transportation Norman Mineta, U.S. Congresswoman Nancy Pelosi, and BART Board Member James Fang

Kopp served as a member of the California High-Speed Rail Authority (CHSRA). As chairman, he worked to lead statewide efforts to develop an 800-mile high speed train network linking northern and southern California with fast, reliable, and environmentally friendly trains capable of traveling at up to 220 mph (350 km/h). To help fund the project, Kopp led efforts to pass Proposition 1A in November 2008, a $9.95 billion bond that has created the momentum that has led to the project receiving billions in federal funds.

On January 28, 2009, without informing the CHSRA board, and without any vote, Kopp sent a list on Rail Authority letterhead to U.S. Senator Dianne Feinstein of "projects that CHSRA has identified...which can currently be commenced." The list omitted any requests for funds for two shovel ready projects: The Anaheim Station and Transbay Terminal extension in San Francisco, which would also serve as a key connection for transit riders arriving from the East Bay, following the decision to align the rail line through the South Bay and Pacheco Pass rather than the East Bay and Altamont Pass. Both the Anaheim Station and Transbay terminal projects had environmental review work completed based on input from the Authority.

At the March 5, 2009 board meeting of the Rail Authority in Sacramento, when it became clear that another rail authority board member had obtained a copy of Kopp's letter, Kopp tried to hastily cure the record. He departed from the Board's meeting agenda and attempted to conduct an ad hoc vote of those board members in attendance regarding a project list which was never provided to the public and without any advance notice, a maneuver that the Train Riders Association of California (TRAC) considers a clear and egregious violation of the Brown Act.

=== Later life ===
Interstate 380 in San Mateo County, a short, urban freeway connector, was renamed the Quentin L. Kopp Freeway in 1998. The road was previously named the Portola Freeway by California's State Legislature, indirectly after Gaspar de Portolà.

In February 2016, Kopp sent a letter to NPR correspondent Tamara Keith, in which he described greetings exchanged between herself and fellow NPR host Audie Cornish as reminiscent of a "moronic schoolgirl". Keith posted two photos of the letter on her Twitter on March 8, 2016. Kopp continues to regularly mail angry letters to journalists at the San Francisco Chronicle.
