= City Attorney of San Francisco =

San Francisco City Attorney's Office
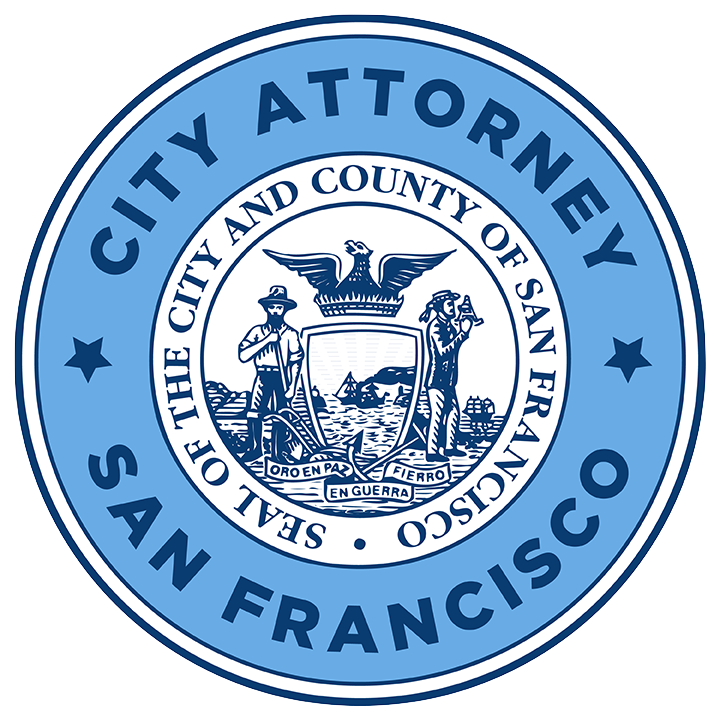

Office overview
- Formed: 1899
- Preceding office: Court of Sessions
- Jurisdiction: Government of San Francisco
- Headquarters: San Francisco, California; 37.77919°N 122.41914°W
- Office executive: David Chiu, City Attorney
- Website: City Attorney website

The city attorney of San Francisco is an elected position in the City and County of San Francisco, California. While city-county consolidation resulted in the unified government having both a city attorney and a district attorney, the two positions are separate and serve different purposes.

Whereas the district attorney's office is, as is the case throughout the United States, charged with prosecuting crimes (i.e. has the equivalent function of a Prosecutor's Office in other countries), the city attorney provides legal services to the mayor, the Board of Supervisors, and the rest of the city and county administration; examines surety bonds, contracts and ordinances; and represents the city and county administration in civil claims, formally as a representative of the people of the State of California.

The city attorney is assisted by a number of assistant city attorneys. In the 1996 city charter, the office is currently governed by section 6.102, last amended in 2002.

== History ==
Prior to 1856, the City of San Francisco had a city attorney but no district attorney, while the County of San Francisco (encompassing the territory of the city and more) had a district attorney but no county attorney. After the city-county consolidation in July 1856, the incumbent city and district attorneys continued as "attorney and counsellor" and "district attorney" respectively, each of the new "City and County of San Francisco". The 1854 city attorney election had been marred by allegations of ballot stuffing, and in 1857 Frederick Palmer Tracy was appointed by the Board of Supervisors. An 1862 act of the California State Legislature made the position of city attorney subject to popular election every two years.

The first woman to hold the position was Louise Renne in 1986, appointed by then-mayor Dianne Feinstein following the death of previous city attorney George Agnost.

== List of City Attorneys ==
Ayuntamiento attorney during interim government of California

- Archibald Carey Peachy (1849–50)

City attorney

- Thomas H. Holt (1850–51)
- Frank M. Pixley (1851–52)
- Charles McC. Delany (Jan–Nov 1852)
- John K. Hackett (1852–53)
- Solomon A. Sharp (1853–54)
- Lorenzo Sawyer (1854–55)
- Balie Peyton (1855–56)

City and county attorney

- Balie Peyton (1856–57)
- Frederick Palmer Tracy (1857–1860)
- Samuel Wirt Holladay (1860–1861)
- John H. Saunders (1861–66)
- Horace M. Hastings (1866–69)
- Joseph M. Nougues (1869–71)
- Wellington Cleveland Burnett (1871–80)
- John Luttrell Murphy (1880–82)
- Jabez F. Cowdery (1882–83)
- William Craig (1883–85)
- John Lord Love (1885–87)
- George Flournoy, Jr. (1887–91)
- John H. Durst (1891–93)
- Harry T. Creswell (1893–1898)
- James L. Gallagher (1898–1899)
- Franklin Knight Lane (1899–1902)
- Percy V. Long (1902–1906)
- William G. Burke (1906–1908)
- Percy V. Long (1908–1916)
- George Lull (1916–1926)
- John J. O'Toole (1926–1949)
- Dion R. Holm (1949–1961)
- Thomas Martin O'Connor (1961–1977)
- George Agnost (1977–1986)
- Philip Ward (1986)
- Louise Renne (1986–2001)
- Dennis Herrera (2002–2021)
- David Chiu (2021–present)

== Sources ==
- San Francisco Board of Supervisors (1911). "Appendix; List of Public Officers of the City and County". San Francisco Municipal Reports for the Fiscal Year 1909–10, Ended June 30, 1910. San Francisco: Neal. pp. 1282–1435.
- Shuck, Oscar Tully (1889). Bench and Bar in California: History, Anecdotes, Reminiscences. Occident.
- Shuck, Oscar Tully (1901). History of the Bench and Bar of California. Los Angeles: Commercial.
