= 1979 San Francisco mayoral election =

- November 6, 1979 (first round); December 11, 1979 (runoff)
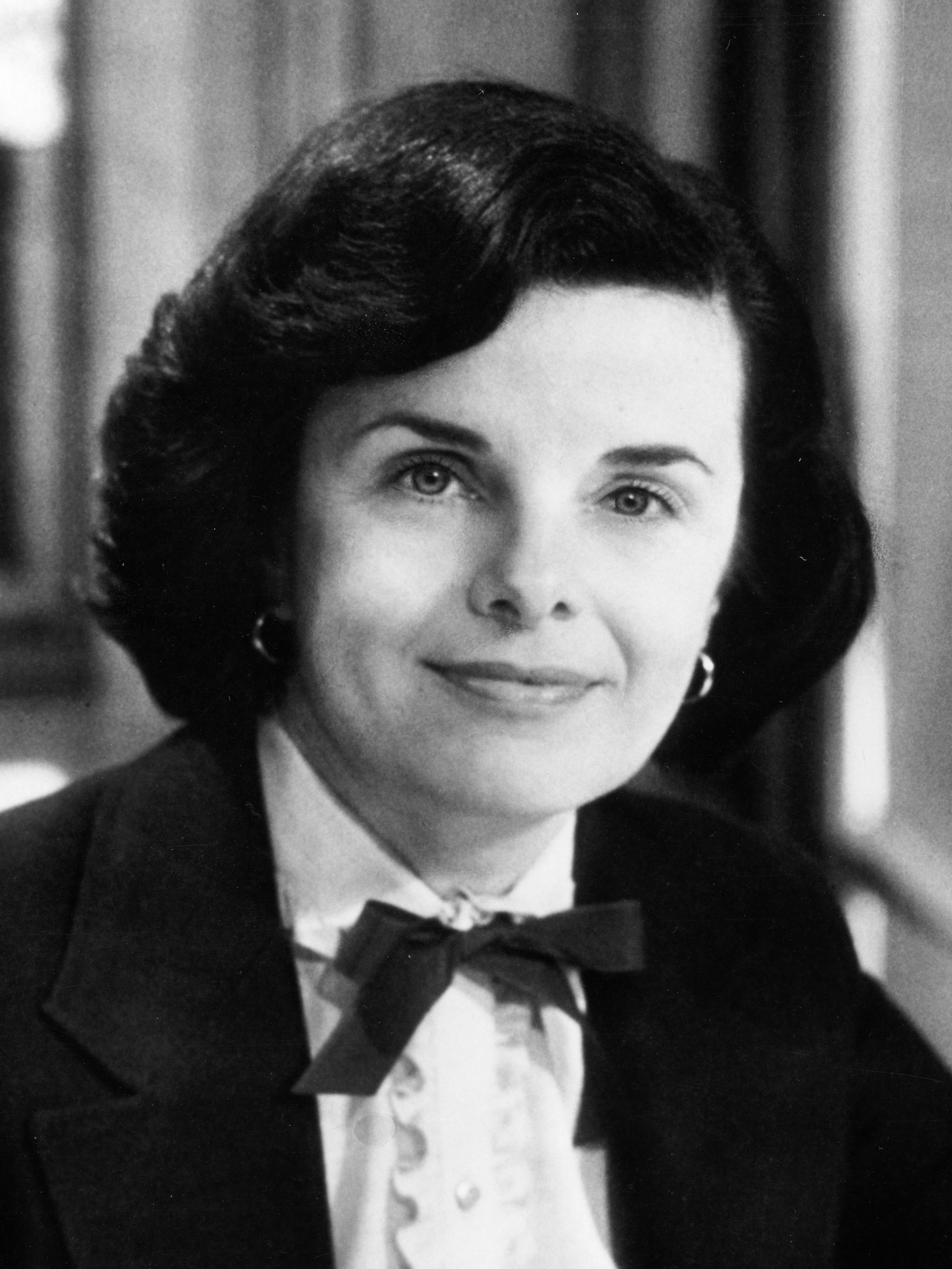

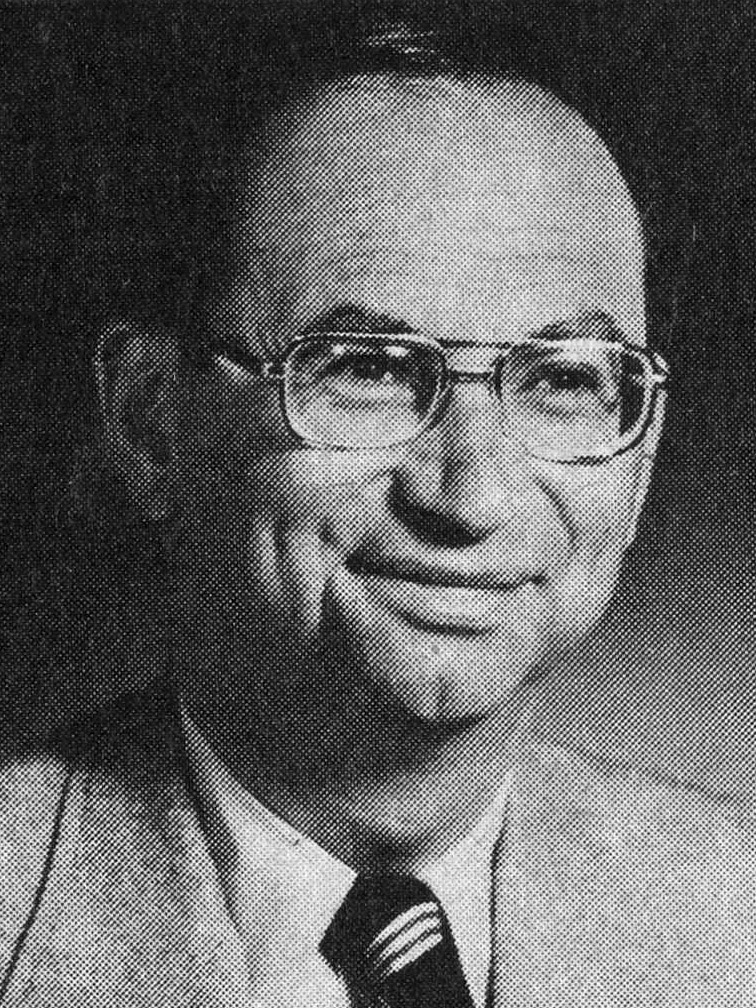

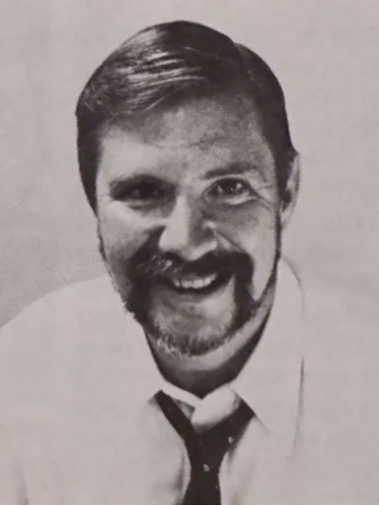
| Candidate | Dianne Feinstein | Quentin L. Kopp | David Scott |
| First round | 81,115; 46.63% | 77,784; 44.72% | 18,506; 9.6% |
| Runoff | 102,233; 53.96% | 87,226; 46.04% | Eliminated |
Mayor before election
Dianne Feinstein
Elected mayor
Dianne Feinstein

The 1979 mayoral election was held to elect the mayor of San Francisco. Incumbent mayor Dianne Feinstein, who had succeeded George Moscone after his assassination the prior year, was elected to her first full term as mayor of the City and County, the first woman to be elected to the position in the city's history. Feinstein, with 46.63%, and Quentin L. Kopp, with 44.72%, were the top two finishers in the first-round, and advanced to a runoff. In the first round the two of them had beat out former Board of Permit Appeals president David Scott, musician Jello Biafra, and six other candidates.

Feinstein and Kopp participated in the December 11 runoff, in which Feinstein won with 53.96% over Kopp's 46.04%. Feinstein was sworn into office on January 1, 1980.

== Campaign ==
Feinstein was seen as having more liberal support than Kopp, including support among the black and homosexual electorate. In turn, Kopp was seen as having more conservative support than Feinstein.

David Scott, the former president of the Board of Permit Appeals, placed third in the first round. His performance, as an openly-gay candidate, was seen as another sign of the growing political influence of the city's LGBT community. The city that had two years earlier seen the election of the late Harvey Milk (who had since been assassinated alongside mayor George Moscone) to the San Francisco Board of Supervisors, and had the previous year seen the passage by the Board of Supervisors of an ordinance banning discrimination on sexuality in housing, jobs, and public accommodations. Additionally that year the White Night riots had occurred, energizing the gay community's activism. For the runoff, Scott gave his endorsement, which had been strongly sought by both remaining candidates, to Feinstein.

A major issue of the campaign was addressing a projected budget deficit of $117 million. Kopp positioned himself as a fiscal watchdog. As solutions to the deficit, he proposed leasing the city-owned zoo and golf course to private entities, making civil service reforms, and cutting costs. Feinstein proposed doubling parking fines, hiking transit fares, and extending the amortization schedule for city pensions from nineteen to twenty years.

Feinstein placed a focus on her ties to the administration of United States President Jimmy Carter, strategically timing her announcements of federal grants being made to the city. Amid the campaign, she also announced that the United States Department of Defense had reversed its earlier decision to decrease operations at the Presidio.

A rainstorm on the day of the election was faulted for what was considered a low turnout of 55%. It had been believed that the lighter turnout was to Kopp's advantage, as Feinstein's more liberal supporters were viewed as less likely to vote than Kopp's more conservative supporters. However, Feinstein still won.

== Results ==
=== First round ===
San Francisco mayoral election, 1979 (first round) November 6, 1979
| Party | Candidate | Votes | % |
|---|---|---|---|
| Democratic | Dianne Feinstein (incumbent) | 81,115 | 42.15 |
| Independent | Quentin L. Kopp | 77,784 | 40.42 |
| Nonpartisan | David Scott | 18,506 | 9.60 |
| Nonpartisan | Eric "Jello Biafra" Boucher | 6,591 | 3.79 |
| Nonpartisan | Sylvia Weinstein | 3,529 | 2.03 |
| Nonpartisan | Cesar Ascarrunz | 1,739 | 1.00 |
| Nonpartisan | Steve L. Calitri | 1,285 | 0.74 |
| Nonpartisan | Tibor Uskert | 739 | 0.43 |
| Nonpartisan | Joe Hughes | 601 | 0.35 |
| Nonpartisan | Patricia Dolbeare | 573 | 0.33 |

=== Runoff ===
Turnout was approximately 55%

San Francisco mayoral election, 1979 (second round) December 11, 1979
| Party | Candidate | Votes | % |
|---|---|---|---|
| Democratic | Dianne Feinstein (incumbent) | 102,233 | 53.96 |
| Independent | Quentin L. Kopp | 87,226 | 46.04 |
