= 1983 San Francisco mayoral election =

- November 8, 1983
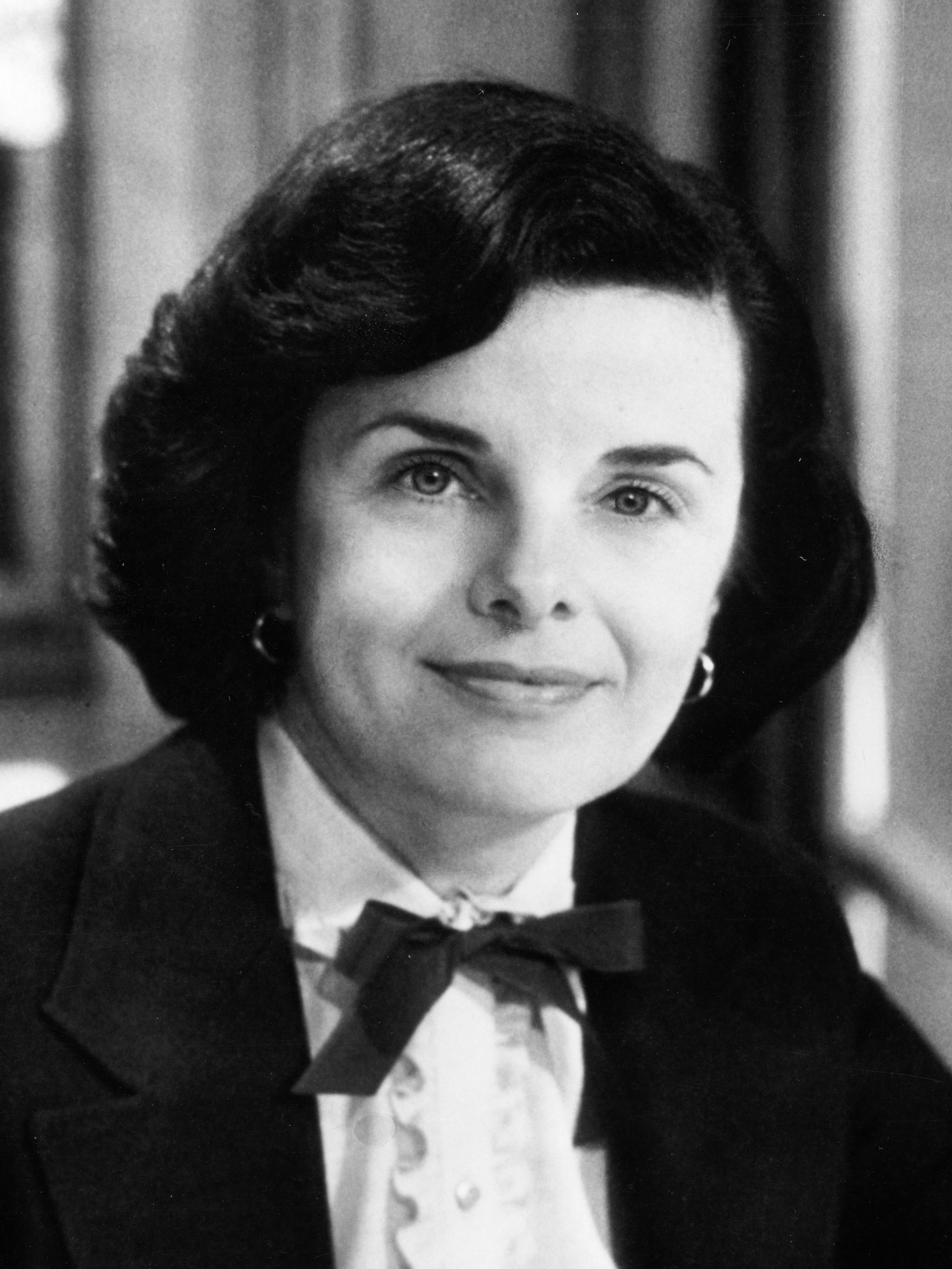

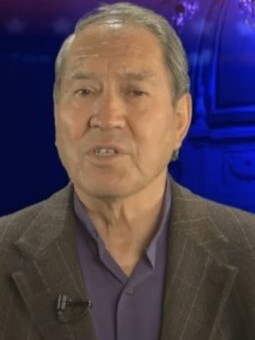

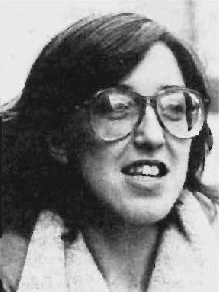
Candidate	Dianne Feinstein	Cesar Ascarrunz	Gloria La Riva
Popular vote	117,489	10,713	7,644
Percentage	80.10%	7.30%	5.21%
Mayor before election
Dianne Feinstein
Elected mayor
Dianne Feinstein

The 1983 mayoral election was held on Tuesday November 8, to elect the mayor of San Francisco. Democratic candidate incumbent mayor Dianne Feinstein, who had previously been subjected to a failed recall election on April 26 (winning with an 83-percent-favorable vote), was re-elected to her second and final term as mayor. Feinstein, winning with 80.10%, defeated Cesar Ascarrunz, Gloria E. La Riva, Pat Wright, Brian Lantz, and Carrie Drake.

Feinstein's strong victory in the recall election months earlier was seen as helping to ward off strong challengers to her reelection in November.

== Results ==
San Francisco mayoral election, 1983 November 8, 1983
Party	Candidate	Votes	%
Democratic	Dianne Feinstein (incumbent)	117,489	80.10
Nonpartisan	Cesar Ascarrunz	10,713	7.30
Workers World	Gloria La Riva	7,644	5.21
Nonpartisan	Patricia Wright	4,566	3.11
Nonpartisan	Brian Lantz	3,537	2.41
Nonpartisan	Carrie Drake	2,700	1.84
Nonpartisan	James Bond Zero (write-in)	12	0.01
Nonpartisan	Ellis Keyes (write-in)	9	0.01
Nonpartisan	Bobby Venegas (write-in)	9	0.01
