= Electoral history of Dianne Feinstein =

Elections featuring American politician

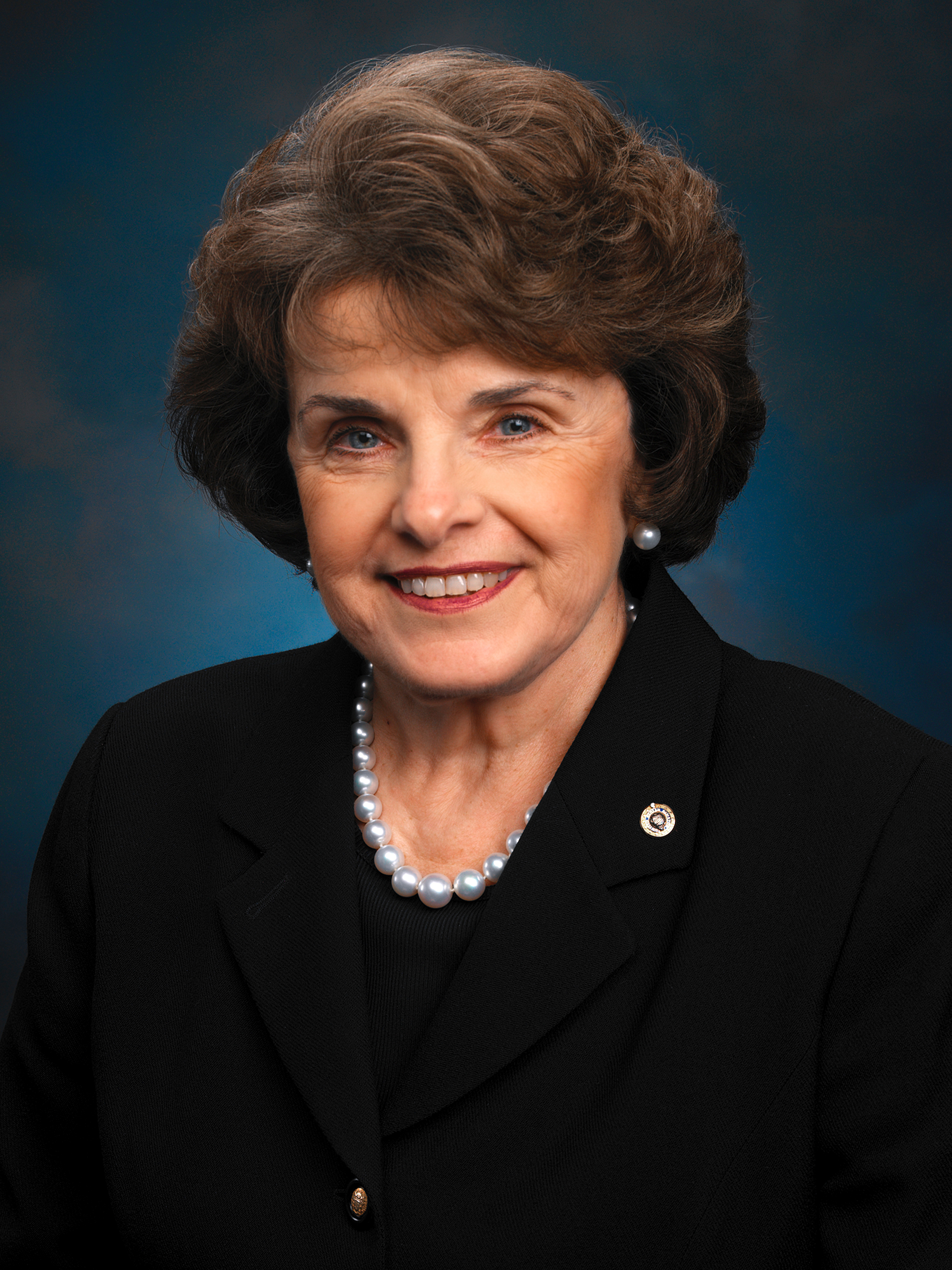
Senator Dianne Feinstein

The electoral history of Dianne Feinstein. Feinstein previously served as a member of the San Francisco Board of Supervisors, Mayor of San Francisco, and was a United States Senator.

== San Francisco mayoral elections ==
=== 1971 ===
San Francisco mayoral election, 1971
Party	Candidate	Votes	%
Nonpartisan	Joseph Alioto	95,744	38.6
Nonpartisan	Harold Dobbs	68,637	27.7
Nonpartisan	Dianne Feinstein	53,911	21.8
Nonpartisan	Fred Selinger	13,902	5.6
Nonpartisan	Scott Newhall	8,534	3.4
Nonpartisan	Tony Serra	2,724	1.1
Nonpartisan	Nathan Weinstein	1,541	0.6
Nonpartisan	John C. Diamante	1,477	0.6
Nonpartisan	Stanley Lee Cotton	670	0.3
Nonpartisan	John Gardner Brent	661	0.3
Nonpartisan	Jeffrey R. Chaskin	304	0.1
Total votes		248,105	100.0

=== 1975 ===
San Francisco mayoral election, 1975
Party	Candidate	Votes	%
Nonpartisan	George Moscone	66,195	31.5
Nonpartisan	John Barbagelata	40,540	19.3
Nonpartisan	Dianne Feinstein	39,344	18.7
Nonpartisan	John A. Ertola	30,360	14.5
Nonpartisan	Milton Marks	27,910	13.3
Nonpartisan	John C. Diamante	2,218	1.1
Nonpartisan	Roland Sheppard	1,080	0.5
Nonpartisan	Ray Cunningham	1,061	0.5
Nonpartisan	Josie-Lee Kuhlman	477	0.2
Nonpartisan	Donald Donaldson	433	0.2
Nonpartisan	Nicholas F. Benton	362	0.2
Total votes		209,980	100.0

=== 1979 ===
San Francisco mayoral election, 1979
Party	Candidate	Votes	%
Nonpartisan	Dianne Feinstein (incumbent)	81,115	42.2
Nonpartisan	Quentin Kopp	77,784	40.4
Nonpartisan	David Scott	18,506	9.6
Nonpartisan	Jello Biafra	6,591	3.8
Nonpartisan	Sylvia Weinstein	3,529	2.0
Nonpartisan	Cesar Ascarrunz	1,739	1.0
Nonpartisan	Steve L. Calitri	1,285	0.7
Nonpartisan	Tibor Uskert	739	0.4
Nonpartisan	Joe Hughes	601	0.4
Nonpartisan	Patricia Dolbeare	573	0.3
Total votes		192,462	100.0

San Francisco mayoral runoff election, 1979
Party	Candidate	Votes	%
Nonpartisan	Dianne Feinstein (incumbent)	102,233	54.0
Nonpartisan	Quentin Kopp	87,226	46.0
Total votes		189,459	100.0

=== 1983 ===
San Francisco mayoral election, 1983
Party	Candidate	Votes	%
Nonpartisan	Dianne Feinstein (incumbent)	117,489	80.1
Nonpartisan	Cesar Ascarrunz	10,713	7.3
Nonpartisan	Gloria La Riva	7,644	5.2
Nonpartisan	Patricia Wright	4,566	3.1
Nonpartisan	Brian Lantz	3,537	2.4
Nonpartisan	Carrie Drake	2,700	1.8
Nonpartisan	James Bond Zero (write-in)	12	0.0
Nonpartisan	Ellis Keyes (write-in)	9	0.0
Nonpartisan	Bobby Venegas (write-in)	9	0.0
Total votes		146,679	100.0

== California gubernatorial elections ==
=== 1990 ===
California gubernatorial primary election, 1990
Party	Candidate	Votes	%
Democratic	Dianne Feinstein	1,361,360	56.3
Democratic	John Van de Kamp	1,067,899	41.0
Democratic	Frank L. Thomas	35,900	1.4
Democratic	Charles Pineda Jr.	25,396	1.0
Democratic	Franklin R. Geraty	24,251	0.9
Democratic	John Hancock Abbott	19,697	0.8
Democratic	Charles A. Mahon III	17,987	0.7
Democratic	F. Frank Wong	16,280	0.6
Democratic	Eileen Anderson	16,116	0.6
Democratic	Lydon Byrne	11,975	0.5
Democratic	Mark Calney	7,923	0.3
Democratic	Sue Lockard Digre (write-in)	68	0.0
Total votes		2,604,852	100.0

California gubernatorial general election, 1990
Party	Candidate	Votes	%
Republican	Pete Wilson	3,791,904	49.3
Democratic	Dianne Feinstein	3,525,197	45.8
Libertarian	Dennis Thompson	145,628	1.9
American Independent	Jerome McCready	139,661	1.8
Peace and Freedom	Maria Elizabeth Muñoz	96,842	1.3
Total votes		7,699,232	100.0
Republican hold			

== United States Senate elections ==
=== 1992 ===
United States Senate special primary election in California, 1992
Party	Candidate	Votes	%
Democratic	Dianne Feinstein	1,775,124	57.7
Democratic	Gray Davis	1,009,751	32.8
Democratic	Davis Kearms	149,918	4.9
Democratic	Joseph Alioto	139,410	4.5
Total votes		3,074,203	100.0

United States Senate special general election in California, 1992
Party	Candidate	Votes	%
Democratic	Dianne Feinstein	5,853,651	54.3
Republican	John F. Seymour (incumbent)	4,093,501	38.0
Peace and Freedom	Gerald Horne	305,697	2.8
American Independent	Paul Meeuwenberg	281,973	2.6
Libertarian	Richard Benjamin Boddie	247,799	2.3
Total votes		10,782,621	100.0
Democratic gain from Republican			

=== 1994 ===
United States Senate primary election in California, 1994
Party	Candidate	Votes	%
Democratic	Dianne Feinstein (incumbent)	1,635,837	74.2
Democratic	Ted J. Andromedas	297,128	13.5
Democratic	Daniel O'Dowd	271,615	12.3
Total votes		2,204,580	100.0

United States Senate general election in California, 1994
Party	Candidate	Votes	%
Democratic	Dianne Feinstein (incumbent)	3,979,152	46.7
Republican	Michael Huffington	3,817,025	44.8
Peace and Freedom	Elizabeth Cervantes Barron	255,301	3.0
Libertarian	Richard Benjamin Boddie	179,100	2.1
American Independent	Paul Meeuwenberg	142,771	1.7
Green	Barbara Blong	140,567	1.7
Total votes		8,513,916	100.0
Democratic hold			

=== 2000 ===
United States Senate primary election in California, 2000
Party	Candidate	Votes	%
Democratic	Dianne Feinstein (incumbent)	3,759,560	95.5
Democratic	Michael Schmier	181,104	4.5
Total votes		3,940,664	100.0

United States Senate general election in California, 2000
Party	Candidate	Votes	%
Democratic	Dianne Feinstein (Incumbent)	5,932,522	55.8
Republican	Tom Campbell	3,886,853	36.6
Green	Medea Susan Benjamin	326,828	3.1
Libertarian	Gail Lightfoot	187,718	1.8
American Independent	Diane Beall Templin	134,598	1.3
Reform	Jose Luis Olivares Camahort	96,552	0.9
Natural Law	Brian M. Rees	58,537	0.6
Independent	John Emery Jones (write-in)	6	0.0
Total votes		10,623,614	100.0
Democratic hold			

=== 2006 ===
United States Senate primary election in California, 2006
Party	Candidate	Votes	%
Democratic	Dianne Feinstein (incumbent)	2,176,888	87.0
Democratic	Colleen Fernald	199,180	8.0
Democratic	Martin Luther Church	127,301	5.0
Total votes		2,503,369	100.0

United States Senate general election in California, 2006
Party	Candidate	Votes	%
Democratic	Dianne Feinstein (incumbent)	5,076,289	59.4
Republican	Dick Mountjoy	2,990,822	35.0
Green	Todd Chretien	147,074	1.7
Libertarian	Michael S. Metti	133,851	1.6
Peace and Freedom	Marsha Feinland	117,764	1.4
American Independent	Don Grundmann	75,350	0.9
Green	Kent Mesplay (write-in)	160	0.0
Independent	Jeffrey Mackler (write-in)	108	0.0
Independent	Lea Sherman (write-in)	47	0.0
Independent	Connor Vlakancic (write-in)	11	0.0
Total votes		8,541,472	100.0
Democratic hold			

=== 2012 ===
United States Senate primary election in California, 2012
Party	Candidate	Votes	%
Democratic	Dianne Feinstein (incumbent)	2,392,822	49.3
Republican	Elizabeth Emken	613,613	12.6
Republican	Dan Hughes	323,840	6.7
Republican	Rick Williams	157,946	3.3
Republican	Orly Taitz	154,781	3.2
Republican	Dennis Jackson	137,120	2.8
Republican	Greg Conlon	135,421	2.8
Republican	Al Ramirez	109,399	2.3
Libertarian	Gail Lightfoot	101,648	2.1
Democratic	Diane Stewart	97,782	2.0
Democratic	Mike Strimling	97,024	2.0
Democratic	David Levitt	76,482	1.6
Republican	Oscar Braun	75,842	1.6
Republican	Robert Lauten	57,720	1.2
Peace and Freedom	Marsha Feinland	54,129	1.2
Democratic	Colleen Shea Fernald	51,623	1.1
Republican	Donald Krampe	39,035	0.8
American Independent	Don J. Grundmann	33,037	0.7
Republican	Dirk Allen Konopik	29,997	0.6
Republican	John Boruff	29,357	0.6
Democratic	Nak Shah	27,203	0.6
Republican	Rogelio T. Gloria	22,529	0.5
Republican	Nachum Shifren	21,762	0.4
Peace and Freedom	Kabiruddin Karim Ali	12,269	0.3
Republican	Linda R. Price (write-in)	25	0.0
Total votes		4,852,406	100.0

United States Senate general election in California, 2012
Party	Candidate	Votes	%
Democratic	Dianne Feinstein (incumbent)	7,864,624	62.5
Republican	Elizabeth Emken	4,713,887	37.5
Total votes		12,578,511	100.0
Democratic hold			

=== 2018 ===
United States Senate primary election in California, 2018
Party	Candidate	Votes	%
Democratic	Dianne Feinstein (incumbent)	2,947,035	44.2%
Democratic	Kevin de León	805,446	12.1%
Republican	James P. Bradley	556,252	8.3%
Republican	Arun K. Bhumitra	350,815	5.3%
Republican	Paul A. Taylor	323,533	4.9%
Republican	Erin Cruz	267,494	4.0%
Republican	Tom Palzer	205,183	3.1%
Democratic	Alison Hartson	147,061	2.2%
Republican	Rocky De La Fuente	135,278	2.0%
Democratic	Pat Harris	126,947	1.9%
Republican	John "Jack" Crew	93,806	1.4%
Republican	Patrick Little	89,867	1.3%
Republican	Kevin Mottus	87,646	1.3%
Republican	Jerry Joseph Laws	67,140	1.0%
Libertarian	Derrick Michael Reid	59,999	0.9%
Democratic	Adrienne Nicole Edwards	56,172	0.8%
Democratic	Douglas Howard Pierce	42,671	0.6%
Republican	Mario Nabliba	39,209	0.6%
Democratic	David Hildebrand	30,305	0.5%
Democratic	Donnie O. Turner	30,101	0.5%
Democratic	Herbert G. Peters	27,468	0.4%
No party preference	David Moore	24,614	0.4%
No party preference	Ling Ling Shi	23,506	0.4%
Peace and Freedom	John Thompson Parker	22,825	0.3%
No party preference	Lee Olson	20,393	0.3%
Democratic	Gerald Plummer	18,234	0.3%
No party preference	Jason M. Hanania	18,171	0.3%
No party preference	Don J. Grundmann	15,125	0.2%
No party preference	Colleen Shea Fernald	13,536	0.2%
No party preference	Rash Bihari Ghosh	12,557	0.2%
No party preference	Tim Gildersleeve	8,482	0.1%
No party preference	Michael Fahmy Girgis	2,986	0.0%
Green	Michael V. Ziesing (write-in)	842	0.0%
No party preference	Ursula M. Schilling (write-in)	17	0.0%
Democratic	Seelam Prabhakar Reddy (write-in)	4	0.0%
Total votes		6,670,720	100.0%

United States Senate election in California, 2018
Party	Candidate	Votes	%	±%
Democratic	Dianne Feinstein (incumbent)	5,976,440	54.2%	−8.12%
Democratic	Kevin de León	5,047,268	45.8%	N/A
Total votes		11,023,708	100.0%	N/A
Democratic hold				
