= Benjamin Saltman =

American poet and educator

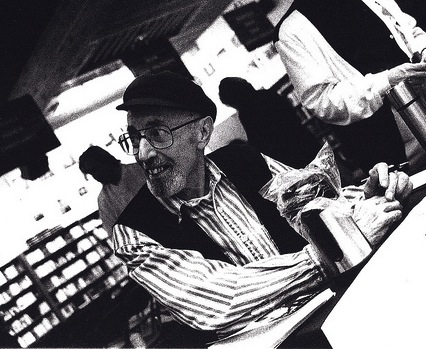
- Benjamin Saltman
- Born: 7 September 1927; Pittsburgh, Pennsylvania
- Died: 9 January 1999 (aged 71); Kensington, California
- Occupations: Poet, professor

Benjamin Saltman (September 7, 1927 – January 9, 1999) was an American poet and Professor of verse writing and contemporary American literature at California State University, Northridge. The Benjamin Saltman Poetry Award is given annually by Red Hen Press in his honor.

== Biography ==
Saltman was born in Pittsburgh, Pennsylvania, the youngest son of Russian-Jewish (Ukrainian) immigrants. He earned a B.A. from the University of Pittsburgh in 1952 and an M.A. in creative writing from San Francisco State University in 1959. After graduation he took a job at Sierra College near Auburn, California where he, along with around seven students, started a literary magazine named Viewpoint. He taught for one year at Sierra College before joining his friend Alvin Duskin as a teacher at the experimental college, Emerson, in Pacific Grove, Ca. From 1965 to 1967 he was an instructor of humanities at Harvey Mudd College. In 1967 he received a Ph.D. from Claremont Graduate School where he wrote his doctoral thesis "The Descent to God: Religious Language in Several Contemporary American Poets". At Claremont Ben Saltman became good friends with poet Bert Meyers, whose friendship and encouragement inspired him to start writing poetry seriously.

Benjamin Saltman married Helen Saltman in 1968, they have three children and six grandchildren.

== Career ==
Saltman was the recipient of two literature fellowships from the National Endowment for the Arts in 1969 and 1987. In 1992, after retiring, he volunteered to teach at California State University Northridge for free after state budget cuts caused the school to cancel 1,000 courses previously scheduled for the fall semester.

== Association with Vedanta ==
After reading the Swami Prabhavananda's translation and commentary on the Bhagavad Gita, Saltman started frequenting lectures at the Vedanta Society of Southern California along with disciples Aldous Huxley and Christopher Isherwood. In addition to being cited as providing editorial assistance for the Swami Prabhavananda in "The Sermon on the Mount according to Vedanta", he wrote an article for "Vedanta and the West" called What Vedanta Means to Me.

== Bibliography ==
=== Books and Chapbooks ===
- Blue with Blue (1968)
- The Leaves, The People (1974)
- Elegies of Place (1976)
- Deck (1979)
- Five Poems (1989)
- The Book of Moss (1992)
- The Sun Takes Us Away (1996)
- Sleep and Death, the Dream (1999)
- The Book of Moss (extended edition – 2016)
- Alone With Everyone: the Uncollected Poems of Benjamin Saltman (2017)
- California Beige and Other Writings (2018)
- A Termite Memoir (2018)

=== Poetry in Magazines ===
- “I Mumble, Mr. Auden,” Shenandoah, 18 (Autumn, 1968), p. 65.
- “As I Dined Out,” Poetry Northwest, 7, 4 (Winter, 1966–67), p. 19.
- “My Father Came to Collins Avenue,” “Trotting Around,” Kayak, 10 (1967) p. 31-33.
- “Bike Ride,” “Blue with Blue,” Lillabulero, 2 (Winter, 1968), p. 3-4.
- “Sunny Engines,” Poetry Northwest, 9 (Spring, 1968), p. 29-30.
- “On Hearing the Vietnamese Poet Nhat Hanh,” Kayak, 15 (1968), p. 36-37.
- “The Sacrifice of Great Lovers,” Westside Poetry Center 2, Los Angeles, (1969) p. 27-28.
- “Looking for Chairs,” “Big Sur River,” Lillabulero, 8 (Winter, 1970).
- “The Whiteness I’ve Been Looking For,” “Many of Us,” Tennessee Poetry Journal, 4 (Fall, 1970), p. 17-18.
- “Drinking Milk,” Shenandoah, 22 (Winter, 1971), p. 65.
- “The Leaves the People,” Lillabulero, 10 & 11 (1971), p. 48.
- “The War Continues on My Daughter’s First Birthday,” Kayak, 27 (1971), p. 15.
- “The Ground” North American Review, 256, 3 (Fall, 1971), p. 50.
- “There’s a Wire,” Seneca Review, 2 (December, 1971), 1p. 3.
- “Fog in the Neighborhood,” Madrona, 2 (Fall, 1971), p. 13.
- “The Journey with Hands and Arms,” Artifax, 1 (October,1971), p. 14-15.
- “I Think of My Daughter’s Birth,” The Iowa Review, 3(1) (Winter, 1972), p. 18.
- “Spaces,” Artifax, 2 (March, 1972), p. 3-5.
- “The Fathers,” North American Review, 257, 2 (Summer, 1972), p. 30.
- “To the Animals: Goat,” Bachy, 1 (Summer, 1972), p. 12.
- “I’ll Be There,” Artifax, 2 (October, 1972), p. 24-25.
- “The Death of Rubin Salazar,” Café Solo, (Spring, 1972), p. 30.
- “Germany,” “Privilege,” “Berryman,” Psychological Perspectives, 4 (Spring, 1973), p. 80-81.
- “Venice Beach Prose,” St. Andrews Review, 2 (Spring, 1974), p. 243.
- “Assembly for the Death of Rooming Houses,” Ohio Review, 15 (Spring, 1974), p. 65.
- “Homescape,” Massachusetts Review, 15 (Autumn, 1974), p. 65.
- “Winters and Winters,” Perspective, 17 (Spring, 1975), p. 256-257.
- “In the Country,” “The Art of Kurt Gerron,” Invisible City, 18-20 (October, 1976), p. 8.
- “Snowpath,” Ironwood, 4 (1976), p. 94.
- “Deck: King of Clubs,” Poetry Northwest, 19 (Spring, 1976), p. 23.
- “Fourteen Poems from Deck,” Bachy, 11 (1978), p. 56-62.
- “Deck: Five of Diamonds,” Ironwood, 6 (1978), p. 76.
- “The Moth,” “Ponies During the Tujunga Fire,” “Only the Dark Green Tree,” “The Miscarriage,” Beyond Baroque, 10 (Summer, 1979), p. 22-23.
- “A Good Brick House in Wood County,” “Taking the Body Back,” Gramercy Review, 3 (Winter, 1979), p. 48-49.
- “Like Peaches,” “A Cool Place,” “Grass Where the Dead Walk Quietly,” “Cauliflower,” “Forgiveness During a Walk on Prospect Street,” “Killing a Bird on the Way to Toledo,” Bachy, 17 (1980), p. 92-94.
- “The Sun Takes Us Away,” Southern Poetry Review, 22 (Spring, 1982), p. 2.
- “Neutral Zone,” “Always Toward Evening,” Epoch, 33 (Spring, 1983) p. 244-245.
- “Shadows,” “The Frail Old Men from California,” Chiaroscuro, 3 (1983), p. 96-99.
- “The Purchase,” Poetry Northwest, 24 (Winter, 1984), p. 34.
- “The Old Jewish Cemetery in Boyle Heights,” Shirim, 3 (Spring, 1984), p. 34.
- “My People,” “Documentary,” Cumberland Poetry Review, 3 (Spring, 1984), p. 34.
- “The Russian Movie,” Hudson Review, 37 (Summer, 1984), p. 261.
- “Bert Meyers,” Shirim, (Spring, 1985), p. 30.
- “Cloudy and Isaac,” (six sections), Poetry/LA, 13 (Fall/Winter 1986–87), p. 67-71.
- “Moving Day,” Shirim, (Fall, 1986), p. 25.
- “Going Away,” Event, 17 (Spring, 1988), p. 39.
- "Taxis at Jaffa Gate,” Shirim.
- “The Summer Drowning,” Pembroke Magazine, 20 (1988), p. 247.
- “Cloudy and Isaac,” Poet Lore, 84 (Spring, 1989), p. 5-22.
- “Always the Falls,” Pikestaff Forum. “Trashcans on Tunney,” “Plans for Departure,” “Goodbye Sorrow,” Poetry/LA 20 (Spring/Summer 1990), p. 13-15.
- “Living at the Mall,” “Yogurt,” “Homage to My City,” Bakunin, 1 (Fall,1990), p. 7-9.
- “Contributor’s Note, 1988,” Slant, 4 (1990), p. 109.
- “The Way to San Onofre,” Southern Poetry Review, 30, no.2 (Fall, 1990) p. 54-55.
- “A Few Days in Ward B,” “The Greenhouse Effect Reaches the Environmental Agency,” Poetry Northwest, 31, no. 4 (Winter, 1990–91), p. 13-15.
- “The Laundry,” Mississippi Review, 19, no. 3 (Spring, 1991), p. 145-146.
- “Downtown Time,” Asylum, 7, 3-4 (Fall, 1991), p. 172.
- “Mandelstam,” “My Mother’s Dutch Fireplace in Pennsylvania,” “Jewish,” “He Wins a Prize,” “Jerusalem Captured,” “Offering of Chickens,” “Indian Silver,” “Cleaning the Alley,” “Two Bird Poems,” Shirim, 10, 2 (December, 1991), p. 17.
- “The Bungee Jumpers,” Aethlon: The Journal of Sport Literature, 8, 2 (Spring, 1992), p. 21-22.
- “Bodhisattva in Anger,” Poet Lore, 87, 2 (Summer, 1992), p. 21-22.
- “Myself as a House,” Negative Capability, 11, 1&2 (1992), p. 194-95.
- “Cleaning the Alley at Last,” “Mirror for My Daughters,” Café Solo, 10, 1, 2, &3 (Fall, 1992), p. 10-11.
- “The Sentence: ‘I Am Dead Without You’,” Santa Monica Review, 5, 1 (Fall, 1992), p. 142-144.
