= J. Eugene McAteer =

American politician (1916–1967)

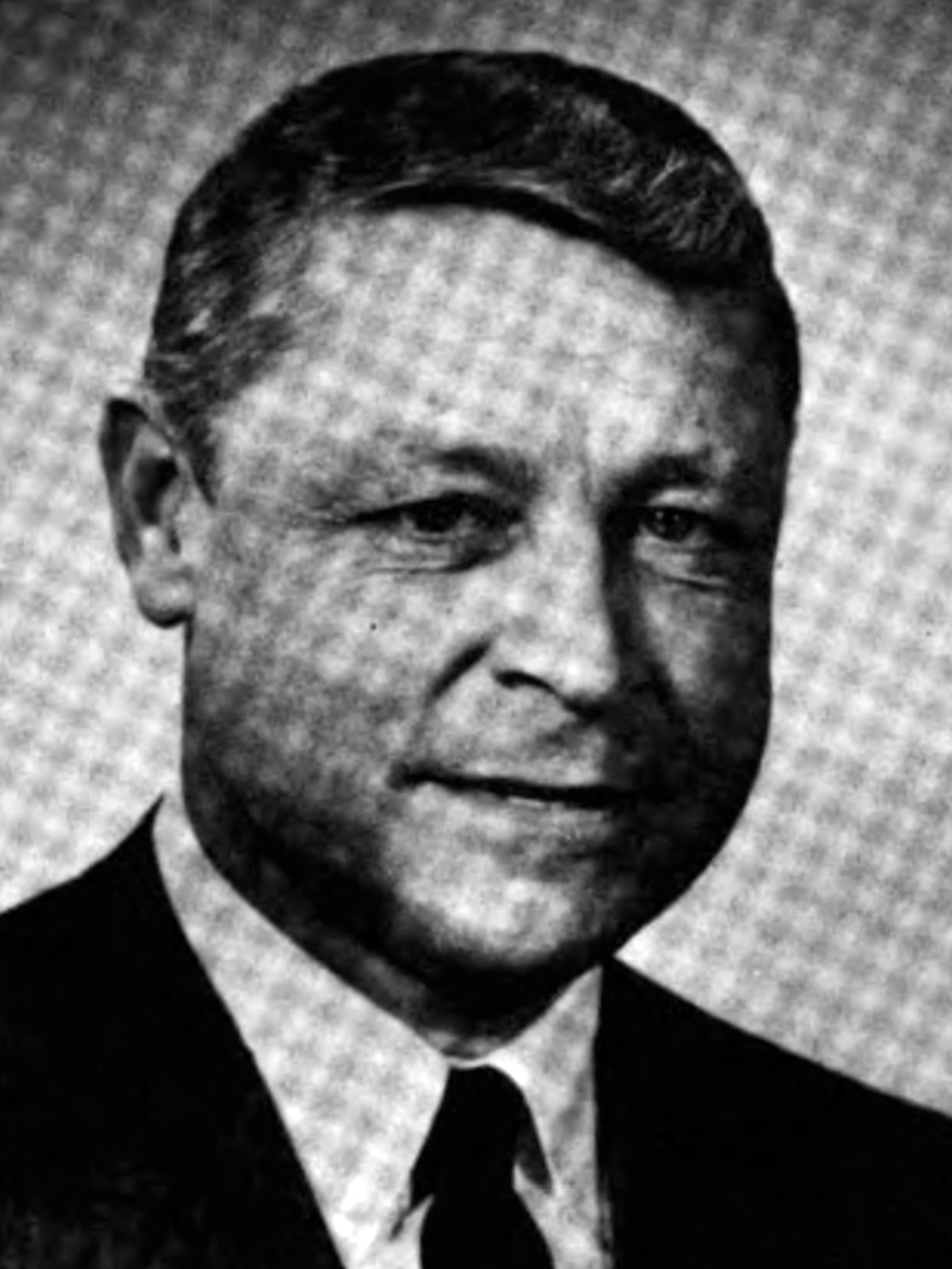
- Official portrait, 1967

Member of the California Senate
- In office January 5, 1959 – May 26, 1967
- Preceded by: Robert I. McCarthy
- Succeeded by: Milton Marks
- Constituency: 14th district (1959–1967); 9th district (1967)

Personal details
- Born: Eugene McAteer; February 28, 1916 San Francisco, California, US
- Died: May 26, 1967 (aged 51) San Francisco, California, US
- Party: Democratic
- Spouse: Frances
- Children: 3

Military service
- Branch/service: United States Navy
- Battles/wars: World War II

J. Eugene McAteer (February 28, 1916 – May 26, 1967) was an American politician who served on the San Francisco, California Board of Supervisors from 1953 to 1958 and in the California State Senate from 1959 to 1967.

== Early life ==
Eugene McAteer was born in San Francisco on 28 February 1916 to Julia Frances (née Harness) McAteer (1890–1955) and Sam Houston McAteer (1886–1958).

== Career ==
McAteer and Daniel J. Sweeney, Jr. operated Tarantino's, a restaurant on Fisherman's Wharf, at the Crab Fisherman's Protective Association building site.

The Spinnaker restaurant, on Shell Beach in nearby Sausalito, was owned by McAteer, William E. McDonnell and John Lynam, designed by supervising architect Walter Zell and architects Hertzka and Knowles, and built in 1960 by Barrett Construction.

McAteer coauthored legislation to create the San Francisco Bay Conservation and Development Commission. The commission's first director, Joseph Bodovitz, said, "What people tend to forget now is how unusual it was to have anybody of McAteer's stature interested in an environmental issue in the sixties."

In 1967, McAteer, a Democrat, announced his intent to run for mayor of San Francisco in the November election, opposing Democratic incumbent John F. Shelley as well as perennial Republican candidate Harold Dobbs. The campaign was cut short by McAteer's death at age 51 in May of that year, while playing handball at the Olympic Club's downtown facility. Shortly thereafter, attorney Joseph L. Alioto, then working on the McAteer campaign, entered the race and subsequently won that fall's election, eventually serving two terms as mayor.

== Personal life ==
Eugene McAteer married Frances May Twohig (1917-2006), a graduate of Mission High School and San Francisco State University.

== Legacy ==
Reid & Tarics designed from 1967, Diamond Heights High School in San Francisco. Thomas J. Mellon, the city's chief administrative officer, suggested it be renamed for Martin Luther King Jr.; it was renamed for McAteer in April 1972, and operated from 1973 to 2002. It is now the site of the Academy of Arts & Sciences (San Francisco) and the Ruth Asawa San Francisco School of the Arts.
