= 1967 San Francisco mayoral election =

- November 7, 1967
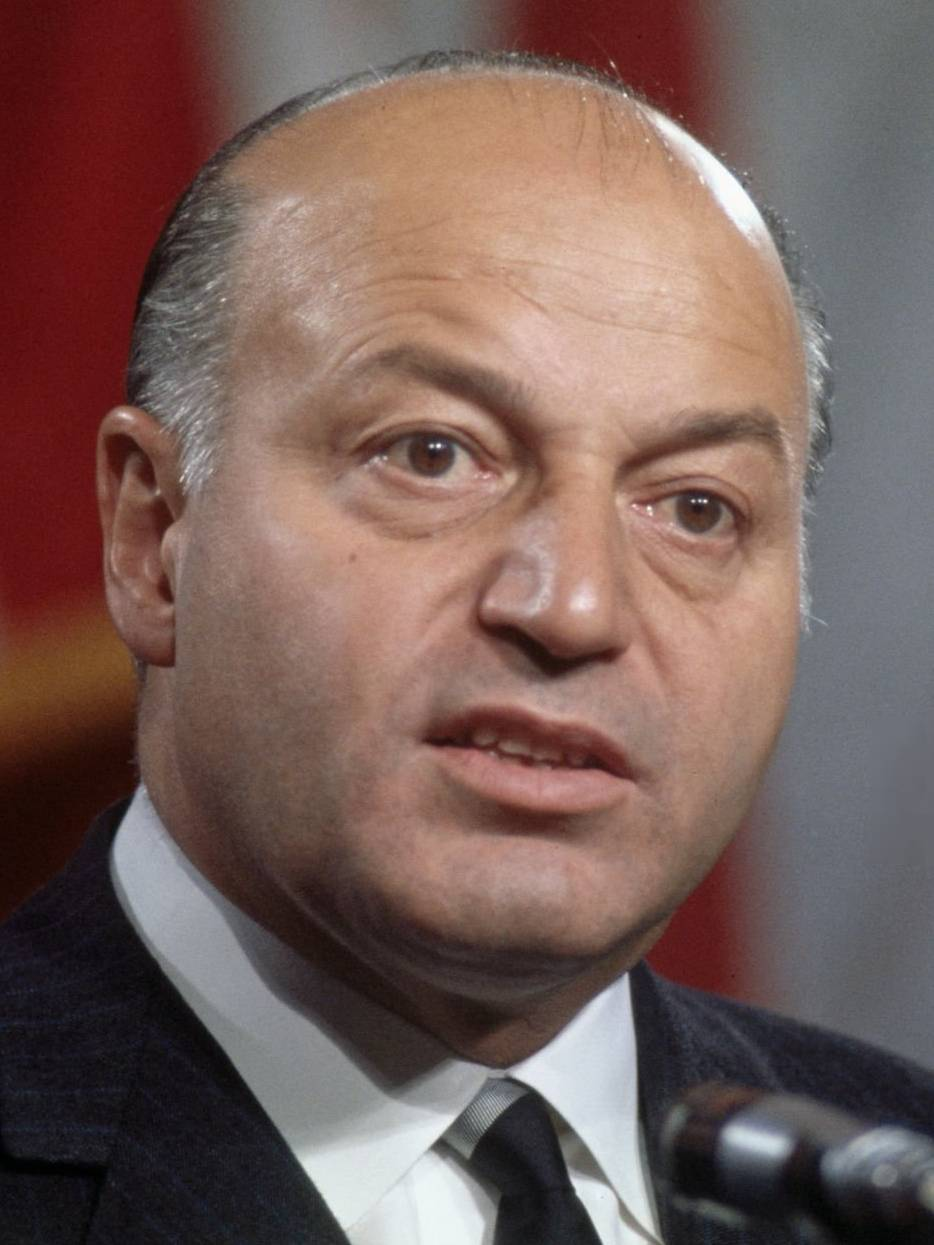

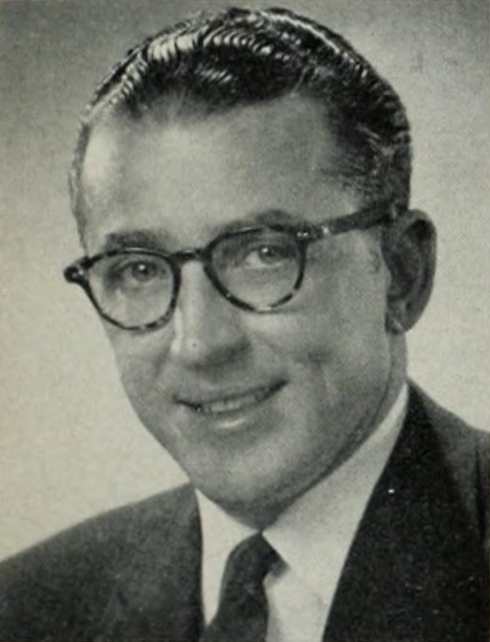

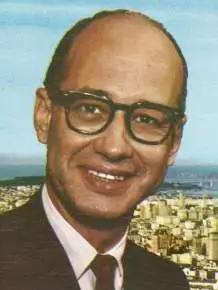
Candidate	Joseph Alioto	Harold Dobbs	Jack Morrison
Party	Democratic	Republican	Nonpartisan
Popular vote	110,405	94,504	56,583
Percentage	44.20%	37.83%	16.19%
Mayor before election
John F. Shelley
Democratic
Elected mayor
Joseph Alioto
Democratic

The 1967 San Francisco mayoral election was held on November 7, 1967.

== Results ==
1967 San Francisco mayoral election
Candidate	Votes	%
Joseph Alioto	110,405	44.20%
Harold Dobbs	94,504	37.83%
Jack Morrison	40,438	16.19%
Robert Charles Le Bugle	553	0.22%
Lloyd Downton	412	0.17%
Claude W. Mitchell	408	0.16%
Charles D. Walker	349	0.14%
Robert Wayne Davis	346	0.14%
William W. Billings	339	0.14%
Earl David Brown	282	0.11%
Herbert Steiner	279	0.11%
George M. Del Secco	278	0.11%
Jerry Patrick Miller	253	0.10%
George W. Looby	252	0.10%
Harold B. Hoogasian	244	0.10%
Wilhelm Joerres	172	0.07%
Ben Maxwell	169	0.07%
Samuel Kline	112	0.05%
Total votes:	249,795	-
