= Joe Bodovitz =

American conservationist (1930–2024)

- Born: Joseph E. Bodovitz; October 29, 1930; Oklahoma City, Oklahoma, U.S.
- Died: March 9, 2024 (aged 93); San Francisco, California, U.S.
- Education: Northwestern University
- Occupations: Journalist, environmentalist
- Spouse: Shirley Leon (m. 1957; died 1997)
- Children: 3

Joseph E. Bodovitz (October 29, 1930 – March 9, 2024) was an American journalist and conservationist. He advocated for the preservation of the San Francisco Bay, and later, the preservation of the coast of California, in order to preserve the nature of the Californian coastline. He served in the United States Navy during the Korean War, before going on to become a journalist and later a conservationist.

== Life ==
Joseph E. Bodovitz was born on October 29, 1930, in Oklahoma City, Oklahoma, during the Great Depression. He earned his bachelor's degree in English literature at the Northwestern University in Evanston, Illinois. After graduating from Northwestern University, he enlisted in the United States Navy, where he served as a navigator aboard the aircraft carrier USS Boxer (CV-21) during the Korean War. When the war ended, Bodovitz left the Navy, and earned a graduate degree in journalism at Columbia University. In 1956, he accepted a job as a reporter for the San Francisco Examiner. The following year, in 1957, he married Shirley Leon, an elementary teacher from San Leandro, with whom he had three children. They moved to Mill Valley shortly after getting married, and the two would remain married until her death 40 years later in 1997. Bodovitz left his job as a journalist in the early 1960s, and subsequently took up a position on the San Francisco Planning and Urban Research Association. The reputation that he earned from his work at SPUR ended up catching the attention of J. Eugene McAteer, a member of the California State Senate, who then approached Bodovitz. McAteer wished to create a government study on regulating the development and filling of the San Francisco Bay, in order to stop business people and some politicians from filling in much of the bay to make room for urban areas. Bodovitz joined the project, eventually taking the lead in creating what would be known as the Bay Plan. He also agreed to serve as the founding executive director of the regulatory agency created, the San Francisco Bay Conservation and Development Commission (BCDC).

In 1972, Proposition 20 was approved by the people of California in a state-wide vote, creating the California Costal Commission, with Bodovitz becoming a founding member. He was made executive director of the CCC by his associate, Melvin B. Lane, who was the chair commission for the BCDC, and had been made the director of the CCC by Ronald Reagan, who was the governor of California at the time. Bodovitz and Lane worked to apply the rules and regulations created for the Bay Area by the BCDC, to the California coastline, and was able to have all beaches in California be made public, ensuring that they would be preserved. The Californian coastline is Federal Land, and is managed of the Bureau of Land Management.

In 1979, Bodovitz was made executive director of the California Public Utilities Commission (CPUC), a position he held until 1986. After leaving the CPUC, he became the president of the California Environmental Trust. He eventually retired, but kept an eye on the environmental affairs of California, and he would also star in a short documentary in 2018 about the environment of Sea Ranch, a town in Sonoma County, California. Bodovitz died in San Francisco on March 9th, 2024, at the age of 93. He is survived by his three children and seven grandchildren.
