= Scott Newhall =

American newspaper editor (1914-1992)

- Born: January 21, 1914; San Francisco, California, US
- Died: October 26, 1992 (aged 78); Valencia, California, US
- Resting place: San Mateo, California
- Spouse: Ruth Waldo

Scott Newhall (January 21, 1914 – October 26, 1992) was a newspaper editor known for his stewardship of the San Francisco Chronicle.

== Early life ==
Scott Newhall was born on January 21, 1914, into the family that owned the Newhall Land and Farming Company. He grew up in San Rafael, San Francisco, and Berkeley, attending Tamalpais School for Boys, Tamalpais High School, San Rafael Military Academy, and the Webb School of California for boys. In 1933, in the midst of his sophomore year at U.C. Berkeley, he married Ruth Waldo.

== Newspaper career ==
In 1934, Newhall joined the San Francisco Chronicle as a photographer. By 1952—when the Chronicle's circulation was 155,000, languishing behind those of the San Francisco Examiner and the San Francisco Call-Bulletin—he was promoted from Sunday editor to executive editor, with the goal of increasing circulation, a goal he achieved by enhancing serious news coverage leavened with zany features and a stable of columnists that included "Dear Abby", Arthur Hoppe, Stanton Delaplane, Charles McCabe, "Count Marco", and Herb Caen. By 1965, the Chronicle had surpassed the competition, with a daily circulation of over 363,000. He left the paper in 1971.

In 1963, he purchased The Newhall Signal, which he sold in 1978, but continued to edit until 1988.

In 2012, he was inducted into the California Newspaper Hall of Fame.

== Anguilla Liberty Dollars ==
Following the July 1967 secession of the Caribbean Island of Anguilla, Newhall, who had covered the event, used the hydraulic presses in the basement of the San Francisco Chronicle to create 11,600 silver dollar-size counterstamped coins bearing the legend "ANGUILLA LIBERTY DOLLAR" encircling the center legend "JULY 11 1967". He offered the new government of Anguilla the opportunity to use his coins for currency. However, the offer was rejected.

== Paddlewheel tug Eppleton Hall ==
In 1970, Newhall purchased, refurbished, and sailed from England to San Francisco the 1914 River Tyne paddlewheel tug Eppleton Hall, which was donated to the San Francisco Maritime National Historical Park.

== 1971 San Francisco mayoral campaign ==
In 1971, Newhall campaigned to become mayor of San Francisco. He came in 5th place, getting 8,704 votes, or 3.44% of total votes cast.

== Personal life and death ==
Newhall's wife Ruth also worked at the Chronicle and later became editor of The Newhall Signal. Their sons, Anthony (Tony) and Jon Newhall assumed responsibility for the newspaper as publisher and editor respectively. Jon continued as a journalist after leaving the Signal, working at Earth magazine, and finally founding Zodiac News Service in San Francisco.

On October 26, 1992, Newhall died at Henry Mayo Newhall Memorial Hospital, which was named after his great-grandfather. He had been suffering from acute pancreatitis. He was 78 years of age.

== See also ==
- Earl Hines, musician, received a piano from Newhall
- Lucius Beebe, writer. Newhall edited one of his books.
- Piru Mansion, restored by Newhall

== Works cited ==
- Bean, Walton (1973). California: An Interpretive History (Second ed.). McGraw-Hill, Inc. p. 454. ISBN 0-07-004224-1. "The San Francisco Chronicle passed from J. H. de Young to his son-in-law George T. Cameron in 1925, and to de Young's grandson Charles de Young Thieriot 30 years later. Under Cameron and his general manager Paul S. Smith the Chronicle made a valiant though generally thankless effort to be a West Coast New York Times. But under Thieriot and his executive editor Scott Newhall the Chronicle launched a much more successful drive to out-Hearst the Examiner in entertainment."
- Caen, Herb (October 18, 1972). "Herb Caen". San Francisco Chronicle. "Scott Newhall, guiding spirit of the S.F. Maritime Museum ever since he helped found it in 1948, has submitted his resignation as a trustee, reportedly because 'the cost accountants have taken over.' One good reason for his pique: the ancient tug, Eppleton Hall, which he sailed here from England in a daring exploit and then presented to the Museum, still lies unused along the waterfront because 'the cost accountants' won't lay out the piddling $8600 it would take to turn her into a public museum. Newhall put a quarter of a million dollars and several buckets of blood, sweat and tears into that old ship and at the moment it all seems down the drain."
- Caen, Herb (November 1, 1994). "Herb Caen". San Francisco Chronicle. "Mick Jagger loves what's left of our historic waterfront. Last Tues., he took his son to the Maritime Museum, and on Thurs. he showed up at the Hyde St. Pier with his wife, Jerry Hall. The apple of his eye: the paddlewheel tug Eppleton Hall, which Scott Newhall, then exec editor of The Chronicle, sailed here from England in an epic 1970 voyage."
- CNPA (March 10, 2021). "Jonathan Newhall, 79". News. California News Publishers Association.
- Carroll, Jon (October 30, 1992). "Memories Of Scott Newhall". San Francisco Chronicle. "Newhall liked sensation, controversy, scandal, violence, the fire and music of life. His particular passions and attitudes became dated, as all ours will, but his spirit is still with us. 'New Hairy Potato Oozes Goo,' said a headline in The Chronicle last Tuesday—pure Newhall."
- Gorney, Cynthia (January–February 1999). "The State of The American Newspaper: The Battle Of the Bay". American Journalism Review.
- Leary, Kevin (October 27, 1992). "Former Chronicle Editor Scott Newhall Dies". San Francisco Chronicle. p. D6.
- Newhall, Ruth Waldo (January 1996). "The Life And Times Of Scott Newhall". Old Town Newhall Gazette.
- Newhall, Scott (1971). The Eppleton Hall. Berkeley: Howell-North Books. ISBN 0-8310-7085-4. LCCN 73-175451.
- Nolte, Carl (October 29, 1996). "Obituary – Count Marco – Outrageous S.F. Advice Columnist". San Francisco Chronicle.
- Nolte, Carl (January 25, 2014). "Eppleton Hall ("Eppie") remembrance". San Francisco Chronicle.
- Riess, Suzanne B. (1989–90). "Liberation of Anguilla Dollar Coin, 1967: A Scott Newhall Escapade". People. Santa Clarita Valley History.
- "San Francisco Mayor: 1971". Our Campaigns.
- Saxon, Wolfgang (October 28, 1992). "Scott Newhall, 78, Newspaper Editor In San Francisco". The New York Times.
- SCVNews (December 4, 2012). "Scott Newhall to Enter Calif. Newspaper Hall of Fame" (Press release) – via SCVTV.
- Stassel, Stephanie (October 28, 1992). "Flamboyant Newspaper Editor Scott Newhall, 78". Los Angeles Times.
- Turner, Jay (April 9, 2020). "A Referendum, a Newspaper Editor & a Coin – The Story of the 'Anguilla Liberty Dollar'". PCGS.
