= The Santa Clarita Valley Signal =

Newspaper published in Santa Clarita, California

- Type: Daily newspaper
- Format: Broadsheet
- Owner(s): Richard and Chris Budman
- Founder: Edward H. Brown
- Publisher: Richard Budman
- Editor: Tim Whyte
- Managing editor: Perry R. Smith
- Founded: 1919
- Language: English
- Headquarters: 25060 Avenue Stanford; Santa Clarita, California 91355; United States
- Circulation: 8,000 (as of 2018)
- Website: signalscv.com

The Santa Clarita Valley Signal is a newspaper in Santa Clarita, California, originally founded in 1919. It is owned by Richard and Chris Budman.

== History ==
On February 7, 1919, Edward H. Brown published the first edition of the Newhall Signal in Newhall, California. Brown died a year later. The Signal was then publisher by his widow, Blanche B. Brown. In 1924, Thornton Doelle founded the Saugus Enterprise. The Signal and Enterprise soon merged with Doelle as lessee and editor. In 1925, Mrs. Brown sold the paper to A.B. Thatcher and William T. Stonecypher. A few months later Stonecypher exited the business.

In 1938, Thatcher sold the Signal to brothers Mark S. Trueblood and Fred W. Trueblood Sr. In 1960, F.W. Trueblood Sr. died. In 1963, Ray W. Brooks, publisher of the Sunland Record Ledger, bought the Signal from the Trueblood family. Later that year, Scott Newhall, long-time editor of the San Francisco Chronicle whose great-grandfather founded the town of Newhall during the California gold rush, bought the Signal from Brooks.

In 1978, Morris Multimedia, led by chairman Charles H. Morris, bought a controlling interest in the Signal. In 1986, a $3 million headquarters was completed and named the "Scott Newhall Building." In 1988, Newhall, his wife and son resigned from the paper. In 1992, Newhall died. In 2016, Morris sold the Signal to Paladin Multimedia Group, owned by Russell Briley, Charles F. Champion, Joseph Barletta.

In 2018, Richard Budman, who had been the Signal's publisher under Morris from 2004 to 2007, and his wife Chris Budman, purchased the Signal. At that time, the paper had a circulation of 8,000 and a newsroom with 24 reporters and editors. Tim Whyte, who had worked with Budman as the Signal's general manager until 2007, returned as editor-in-chief. Whyte writes all the editorials for the daily. Following the sale, the Signal began to publish a new Sunday magazine with free distribution to 75,000 households, featuring a "bylined column" entitled "Black and Whyte" by Whyte.

== Controversy ==
According to an October 9, 2018 article in the Columbia Journalism Review (CJR), the new management led to a conservative shift in the paper's editorial stance, which prompted a group of progressives in the Santa Clarita Valley to start their own news outlet, the Proclaimer. According to a July 24, 2018 article in The Daily Beast, the Budmans have espoused conspiracy theories and promoted the Republican Party in the valley. Richard Budman defended himself against allegations that the couple's politics could influence the newspaper's editorial stance, stating that the newspaper ran positive stories on Katie Hill, then a Democratic congressional candidate.
