= 1971 San Francisco mayoral election =

- November 2, 1971
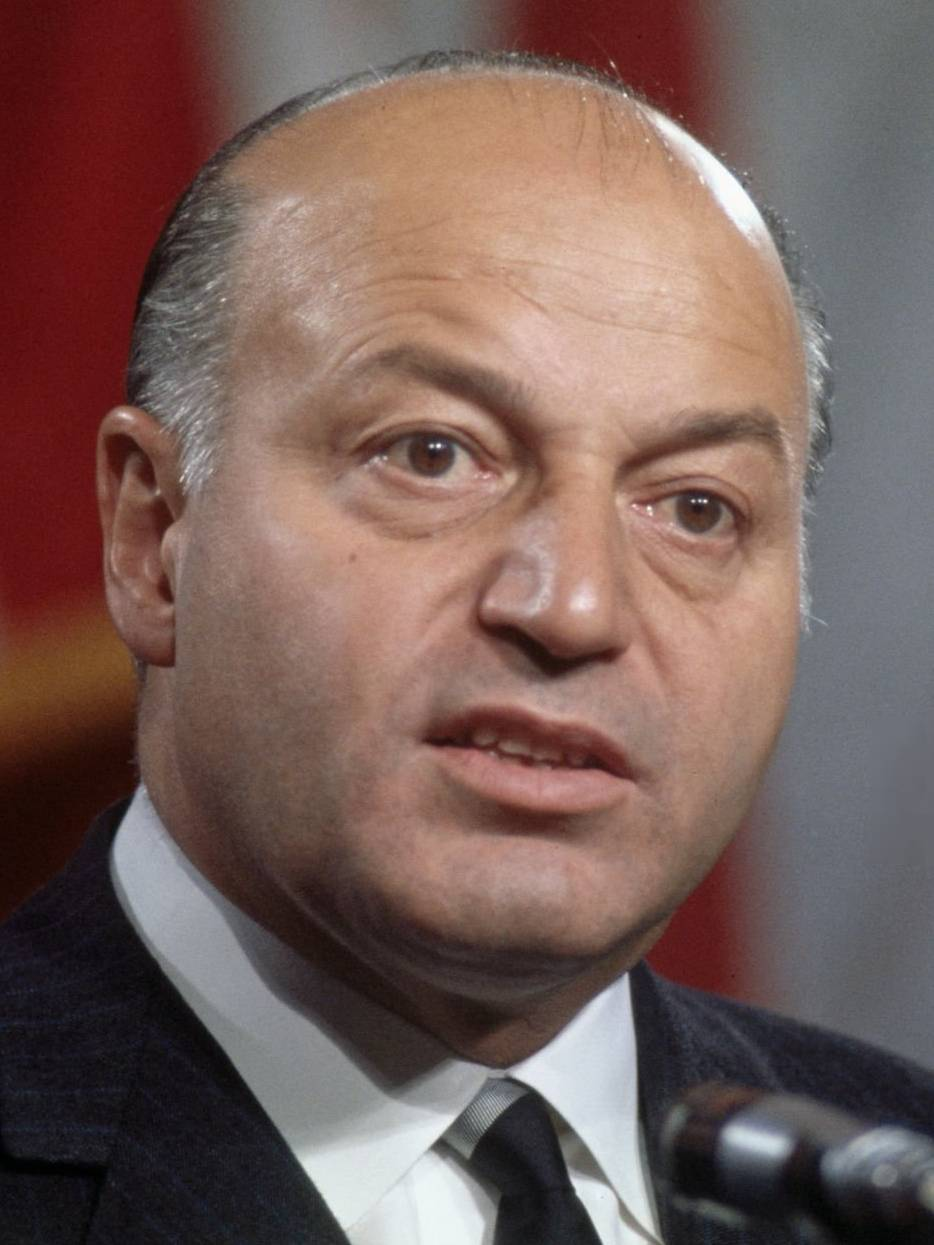

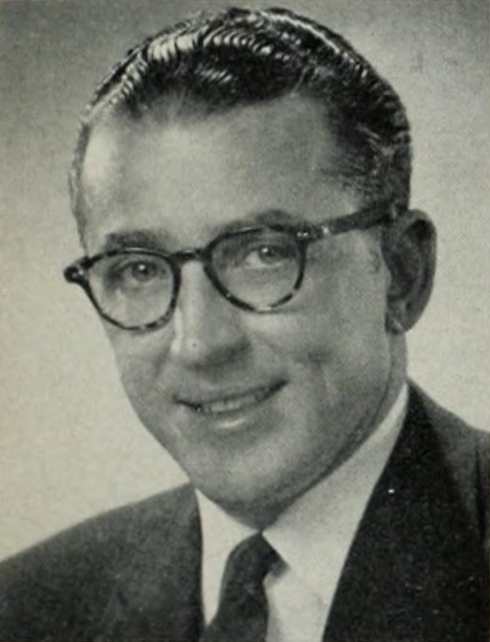

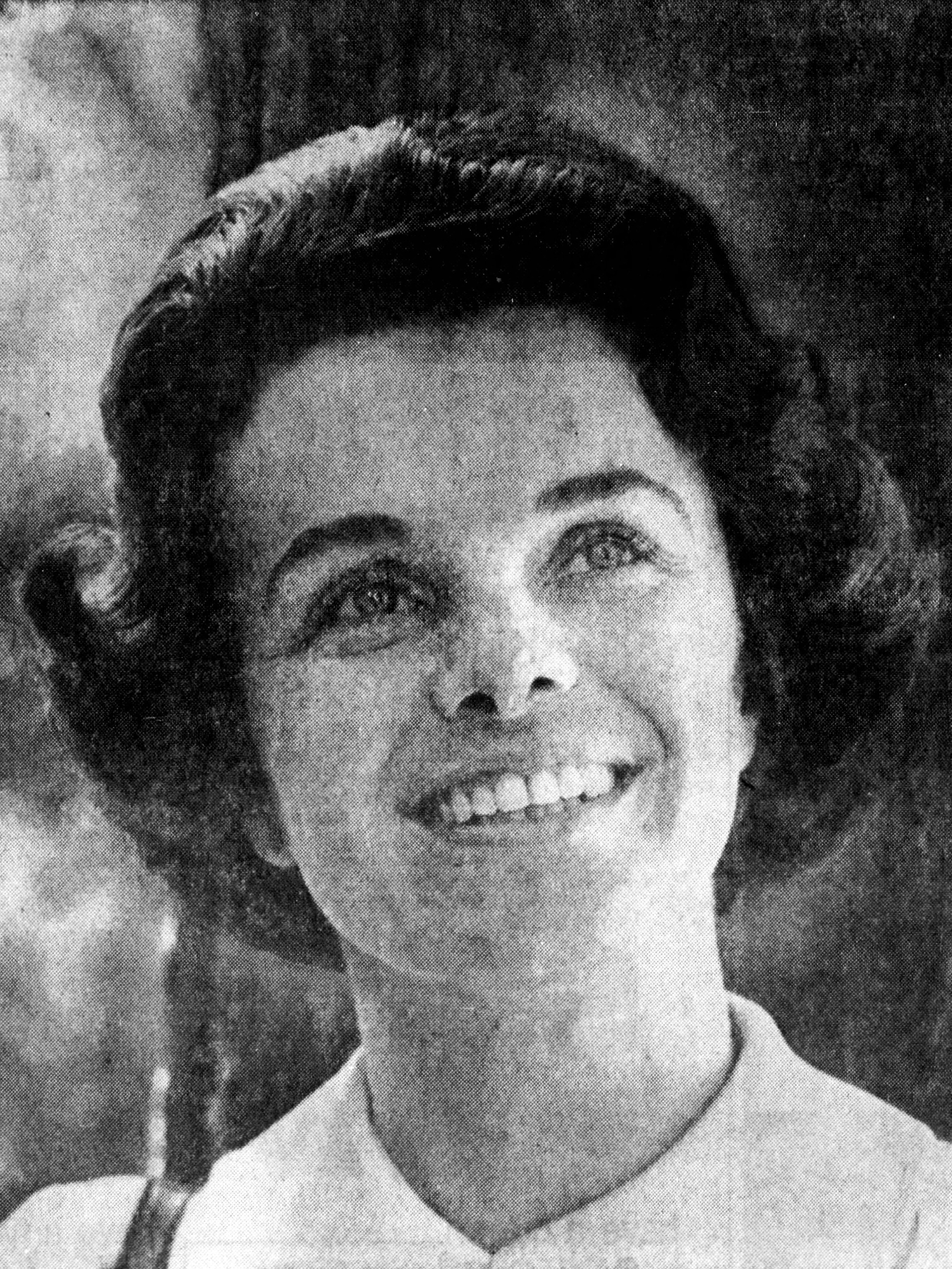

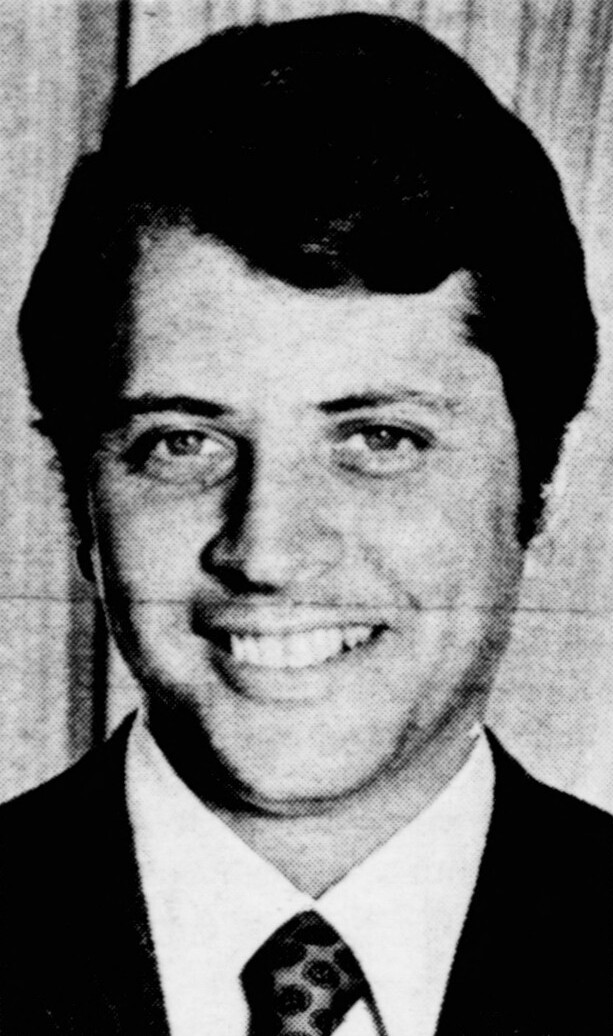
Candidate	Joseph Alioto	Harold Dobbs
Party	Democratic	Republican
Popular vote	95,744	68,637
Percentage	38.6%	27.66%
Candidate	Dianne Feinstein	Fred Selinger
Party	Democratic	Nonpartisan
Popular vote	53,911	13,902
Percentage	21.8%	5.6%
Mayor before election
Joseph Alioto
Democratic
Elected mayor
Joseph Alioto
Democratic

The San Francisco mayoral election of 1971 was held on November 2, 1971, with incumbent Joseph Alioto being re-elected with 38.6 percent of the vote, from among 11 candidates, there being no provision for a runoff.

== Campaign ==
The three major contenders—Mayor Joe Alioto; Harold Dobbs, former member of the Board of Supervisors; and Dianne Feinstein, president of the Board of Supervisors—tried to outdo one another as advocates for law and order. Alioto challenged Dobbs to commit to keeping Police Chief Donald Scott and accused Feinstein of wanting to create a civilian review board to investigate police conduct. Dobbs would not commit to a particular police chief but did plan to appoint a new police commission. Feinstein planned to "serve notice on the pusher, the mugger and the thief" and "break the back of crime", while denying advocating a civilian review board but wanting a "strong and independent police commission."

Feinstein, the only woman in the race, charged her opponents with distorting her positions, especially her position on school busing, which the two other main contenders, Alioto and Dobbs, opposed. The issue was raised as the result of an unpopular court order forcing the S.F. school district to begin busing to achieve ethnic balance in elementary schools.

Former newspaper editor Scott Newhall proposed staging a world ecology fair and replacing California's water plan by importing icebergs, and imputed little difference between the top three contenders, whom he lumped together as "Joe Dobbstein".

Alioto was a slight favorite to win in spite of being scheduled to go on trial the following January on federal charges of conspiracy, mail fraud, and using the mail to promote bribery of a public official. As of November, Dobbs, the only Republican in the race, had passed Feinstein in polls and was gaining on Alioto.

== Results ==
The result of the November 2 election was the re-election of Alioto by a 3–2 margin over his nearest challenger. Alioto quoted Jackie Gleason—"How sweet it is!"—at a victory celebration and referred to his federal indictment as an attempt by the "national administration" to "knock out a mayor".

Among other races on the ballot was Richard Hongisto's surprise victory for sheriff over incumbent Matthew Carberry.

On the ballot was a referendum limiting new-building heights to six stories, which was defeated.

A referendum to make the school board an elective one, it being the only appointive such board in the state, passed. The school-board measure was regarded as a reaction to busing initiated by the school board under court order.

Another measure approved was to keep cable car service at no less than current levels.

San Francisco mayoral election, 1971
Party	Candidate	Votes	%
Democratic	Joseph Alioto (incumbent)	95,744	38.6
Republican	Harold Dobbs	68,637	27.7
Democratic	Dianne Feinstein	53,911	21.8
Nonpartisan	Fred Selinger	13,902	5.6
Nonpartisan	Scott Newhall	8,534	3.4
Nonpartisan	Tony Serra	2,724	1.1
Nonpartisan	Nathan Weinstein	1,541	0.6
Nonpartisan	John C. Diamante	1,477	0.6
Nonpartisan	Stanley Lee Cotton	670	0.3
Nonpartisan	John Gardner Brent	661	0.3
Nonpartisan	Jeffrey R. Chaskin	304	0.1

== See also ==
- Alvin Duskin
