= Charles McCabe =

American journalist

Charles McCabe, 1962

Charles McCabe (1915–1983) was a columnist for the San Francisco Chronicle from the mid-1950s until his death May 1, 1983 at the age of 68.

== Writing ==
McCabe started as a police reporter for the New York American in 1936 and later worked for the Puerto Rico World-Journal, United Press and The San Francisco Examiner before joining the Chronicle in the mid-1950s.

McCabe wrote a book called Tall Girls are Grateful which humorously reflected upon his love/hate relationship with women, and another called The Good Man's Weakness recording his wry thoughts on drinking, the other love/hate relationship in his life. There is also a compilation of his essays put together in the book The Fearless Spectator by Chronicle Books (1970)

Another book was a biography of his grandfather-in-law, the newspaper man, E. W. Scripps, who was also principal founder and supporter of the Scripps Institution of Oceanography, the Scripps Howard Foundation, and United Press International (UPI).

=== Chronicle column ===
McCabe was renowned in San Francisco for his satirical newspaper column in the Chronicle under the byline "The Fearless Spectator", and for his robust social life centered on the many "watering holes" he frequented.

While at the Chronicle, his boss Scott Newhall assigned him to do a column for the sports section of the newspaper. McCabe knew little about sports and had virtually no interest in the subject. Newhall dubbed him the "fearless spectator" and took publicity photographs of McCabe perched on a shooting stick, wearing a derby and looking bored. Initially the column was placed in the sports section but having little if anything to do with sports it was eventually moved to the features section. A black and white icon of McCabe in the bowler hat always sat next to the title of his column "The Fearless Spectator".

McCabe would arrive at the Chronicle offices at 5th and Mission at what his colleagues called the "ungodly hour" of 8AM. He would feverishly type up his column and then leave before 9AM to get his breakfast of five or six "Green Deaths" at Gino and Carlo, a bar in San Francisco's North Beach neighborhood.

=== His replies to letters from his readers ===
McCabe professed little interest in what his readers wrote to him. His editorial assistant, Mike Brown, would write touching or apologetic replies to most if not all of the letters. It is interesting that many people still remember the beautiful letters and indicate that the letters formed their opinion about McCabe yet he never read nor wrote any of them.

=== Political views ===
McCabe as previously noted was a satirical journalist. While there were sometimes underlying political implications in his columns, it was not common. In the late 1950s, US Steel proposed to build a huge building (the US Steel Tower) near the Embarcadero and towering 80 feet higher than the West Tower of the nearby Bay Bridge. Both McCabe and Herb Caen, another SF Chronicle columnist, took strong stances against its construction. The project was eventually abandoned.

== Watering holes ==
McCabe was a frequent imbiber at his favorite bar Gino and Carlo, in North Beach, where he enjoyed his Rainier ale (AKA "Green Death"); at Mooney's Irish Pub for the Irish whiskey and conversation; and sometimes at Deno and Carlo's bar, also in North Beach, for the dark beer, music, and a monthly get together with his friend Ron Small.

=== Green Death ===
Green Death was the nickname for Rainier Ale. This was McCabe's favorite beer and he often wrote about his fondness for the brew in his column.

After his death, his friend Denis Prescott poured a bottle of the brew over the side of the passenger liner the S.S. Santa Maria in memory of McCabe. McCabe traveled on the Santa Maria frequently and was well known and liked by the ship's crew. They stopped the ship and announced the event just prior to the ceremonial pouring

== Personal life ==
He was born and raised in New York's "Hells Kitchen" and was educated by the Jesuits. After moving to San Francisco as an adult, he was a resident in one of the City's oldest neighborhoods above the North Beach district. With a panoramic Bay view (from 22 Alta Street on Telegraph Hill), he lived where homes line narrow alleys and steep staircases replace hillside streets.

Charles R. McCabe and Peggy Scripps McCabe were married at her family's 26-acre Lake Tahoe estate in Glenbrook, Nevada. The bride was a graduate of Scripps College, which was founded by her great-aunt Ellen Browning Scripps. They had four children: Margaret "Nini" McCabe, Charles K. McCabe, Peter McCabe, and Mary Pierce.

== Death ==
Charles McCabe was found dead on May 1, 1983, in his San Francisco apartment by his daughter. He had apparently tripped and hit his head while falling. He died of a severe concussion

=== Obituary ===
More than 400 friends, colleagues and faithful readers gathered at St. Francis of Assisi Church in North Beach on May 4 for a final farewell to Charles McCabe, the stylish essayist who wrote a popular column for the Chronicle for nearly 25 years. The Mass of Resurrection was celebrated by his friend John M. Ring, pastor of Our Lady of Carmel Church in Mill Valley, who praised the writer for having "a restless heart and mind and spirit, which were his greatest gifts." "Charles couldn't stand anything phony, whether it be presidents, governors, oily-tongued clergymen or razor blades," the priest told a group that included socialites, journalists and many blue-collar drinking buddies. The Mass was planned in accordance with McCabe's will, in which he asked that the music at his funeral include Bach's "Sheep May Safely Graze" and that three Shakespeare sonnets be read by his friend and attorney, Carlos Bea.

== Notable quotes ==
McCabe was also known for his satirical sayings. One of his more notable quotes was "it may truly be said that if you are tired of San Francisco, you are tired of life.", and "Any clod can have the facts, but having opinions is an art."
Another was "McCabe's Law: Nobody has to do anything."
