= Eppleton Hall (1914) =

Paddlewheel tugboat built in 1914

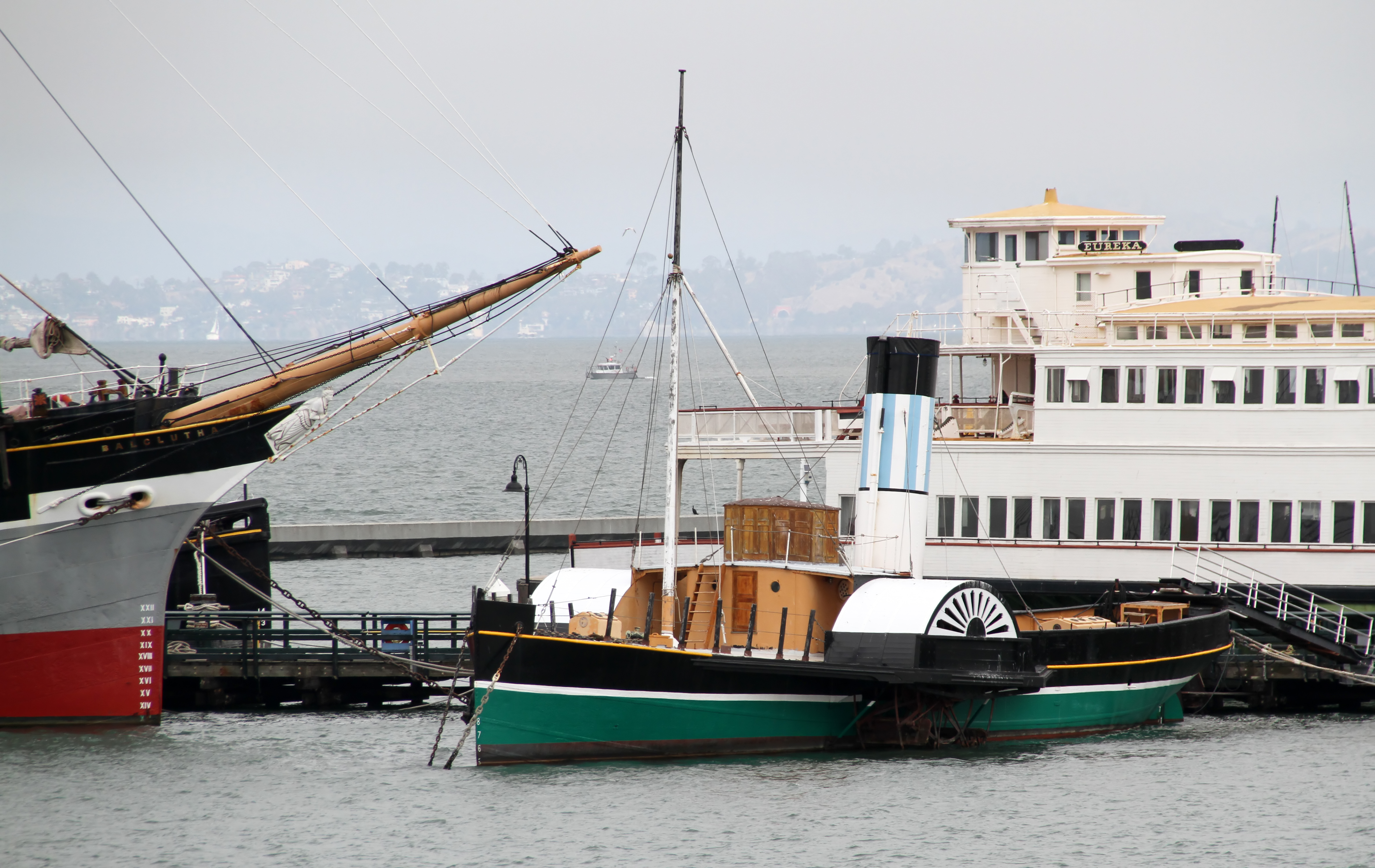
- Eppleton Hall in San Francisco

History
- Owner: 1914-1924 Lambton and Hetton Collieries Ltd; 1924-1945 Lambton, Hetton & Joicey Collieries Ltd; 1945-1964 France, Fenwick Tyne & Wear Co Ltd; 1964-1967 Seaham Harbour Dock Co; 1967-1979 Scott Newhall/Karl Kortum; 1979 National Park Service
- Port of registry: 1914-1967 Newcastle upon Tyne; 1969 San Francisco, California
- Builder: Hepple and Company, South Shields
- Yard number: 632
- Completed: 1914
- In service: 1914-1967
- Status: Museum ship at San Francisco, California

General characteristics
- Type: Tugboat
- Tonnage: 166 gross register tons (GRT)
- Length: 100.5 ft (30.6 m)
- Beam: 21.1 ft (6.4 m)
- Depth of hold: 10.8 ft (3.3 m)
- Installed power: 500 ihp (370 kW)
- Propulsion: Steam side-lever engines
- Speed: 10 knots (19 km/h; 12 mph)
- Eppleton Hall
- U.S. Historic district – Contributing property
- Location within California Location within the United States
- Location: Fort Mason, Bld. 201, San Francisco, California
- Coordinates: 37°48′34″N 122°25′19″W
- Part of: San Francisco Maritime National Historic Site (ID01000281)
- Added to NRHP: June 27, 1988

Eppleton Hall is a paddlewheel tugboat built in England in 1914. The only remaining intact example of a Tyne-built paddle tug, and one of only two surviving British-built paddle tugs (the other being the former Tees Conservancy Commissioners' vessel, PS John H Amos), she is preserved at the San Francisco Maritime National Historical Park in San Francisco, California.

== History ==
Eppleton Hall was built in 1914 by Hepple and Company of South Shields, for the Lambton and Hetton Collieries Ltd, and named after the house near Penshaw owned by the Hetton Coal Company. She was designed to tow seagoing colliers from sea to wharf side and back, primarily in the River Wear and to and from the River Tyne. For sailing ships this saved time, while for larger steam and motor vessels it saved navigation and pilotage costs. She was also used to tow newly built ships out to the North Sea.

She is one of two survivors of a once-numerous type of steam powered paddle tug that began with the 1814 "Tyne Steam Boat", later named Perseverance. One of the last of her type built, Eppleton Hall was equipped with twin surface condensing side-lever engines of the "grasshopper" or "half-lever" type, totalling 500 indicated horsepower (370 kW), also built by Hepple & Company. Her speed was 10 knots (19 km/h; 12 mph), and her engines could function independently of each other to aid manoeuvrability, enabling her to turn inside her own length.

The tug was operated from 1914 by the Lambton & Hetton Collieries Ltd which, merged with the Joicey Collieries in 1924 to form the Lambton, Hetton & Joicey Collieries Ltd. In November 1945, a little before the collieries themselves were nationalised and vested in the National Coal Board, the towage business was sold to France, Fenwick Tyne and Wear Ltd which, after refurbishment, operated her at Sunderland on the River Wear until 1964. In 1952, the tug was modified slightly to obtain a passenger certificate, so that she could transport officials from newly built ships after they had completed their sea trials.

In November 1964 France, Fenwick Tyne & Wear disposed of their last paddle tugs, Houghton (built in 1904, also by Hepple, for the Lambton Collieries, and which was scrapped) and Eppleton Hall. The latter was sold to the Seaham Harbour Dock Company, where she worked alongside Reliant.

Sold to shipbreakers Clayton and Davie Ltd for scrap in 1967, she was left sitting on a mud bank in Dunston. As part of the scrapping process her wooden afterdeck and interior were destroyed by fire prior to being broken up. The tug remained there for two years, deck frames warped, wood burned or rotted, hull part flooded and engines rusty but intact.

=== Preservation ===
News of the sale of the last steam paddle tug still in service anywhere in the world, the Reliant, reached Karl Kortum, then director of the San Francisco Maritime Museum. Kortum informed museum trustee Scott Newhall, who proceeded to Newcastle to purchase the ship.

The plan met with opposition, as the British National Maritime Museum had prior claim to the 1907 built Reliant, as they planned to scrap the hull and preserve one or both of the Side Lever ( or Grasshopper ) engines and perhaps a paddle wheel. It was suggested that a deal could be done, if the SMM were to buy the Eppleton Hall and pay for the cost of fitting out the display for the NMM in exchange for the operable Reliant.

Despite the fact that Eppleton Hall was already in a partially scrapped condition and would have been equally suitable to provide either or both of her two engines, attempts to negotiate with the then NMM Curators Mr. Basil Greenhill and the Viscount Runciman of Doxford collapsed following six months of deliberations on the part of the NMM. The final communication between the two museums was described by Newhall in his book as being "fatuous, uncooperative or downright insulting", as it seemed to suggest that adapting the identical non-running engines from the scrap tug for display in Greenwich would require "massive re-planning", that Reliant could not possibly steam intact from Newcastle to San Francisco, and, by implication, that the San Francisco Maritime Museum could not afford to pay for either venture.

Newhall then attempted to acquire Reliant by subterfuge, leading a team to Seaham to collect the tug pretending to be representatives of the NMM. This attempt apparently failed when the police were called.

The day after this Newhall acquired the remains of the derelict Eppleton Hall from Mr. HW Clayton of Clayton and Davey with the intention of restoring her for return to San Francisco.

Rebuilt at Bill Quay, near Hebburn on the river Tyne, during 1969, the tug was modified to enable her to cross the Atlantic Ocean under her own steam, requiring the fitting of modern navigational aids, radio, an enclosed wheelhouse and conversion from coal to diesel oil firing. Thus Eppleton Hall was made to serve as Kortum's "private yacht" and was re-registered as such. at 1:00 pm On 18 September 1969 the tug sailed on the first leg of the journey to San Francisco (via the Panama Canal) to pass under the Golden Gate Bridge by late March 1970, six months and nine days after setting sail.

Newhall subsequently wrote the book The Eppleton Hall which tells the story of the discovery and restoration of the ship, the events surrounding Reliant, and the eleven thousand mile journey from the Tyne to San Francisco. The route chosen was determined by the tug's conversion to diesel firing with the resultant limited fuel capacity and her low overall power output. Sailing via Dover, Lisbon, Cape Verde, Georgetown, via Panama and San Diego to name but a few of her scheduled stops; not counting running out of fuel in the Bay of Biscay, vacuum pump failure in mid Atlantic, rescuing a fishing vessel off the coast of Mexico, and nearly foundering in a storm out of San Diego on the final leg to San Francisco.

Donated by Kortum to the National Park Service in 1979, she is now berthed at Hyde Street Pier, San Francisco. She has been restored to resemble her condition post-War 1946, when refurbished for France Fenwick, Tyne and Wear Ltd.

=== Present day ===
Not eligible for grants reserved for US built vessels, the ship is visible from and moored to Hyde Street Pier but is not open to the public for boarding. Despite this it is in a superior condition to John H Amos, a similar paddle tug built in Scotland in 1931, currently lying at Chatham awaiting funds for restoration, having been sunk in 1994 and then salvaged some years later.

Reliant was dismantled by the National Maritime Museum and sectioned for display in pride of place in the museum's Neptune Hall, where it remained on display until 2005. The tug was then controversially removed and scrapped as a cost reduction exercise, with only a single engine and a sectioned representation of one paddle wheel remaining on display (as had been originally intended back in 1969). Further controversy followed as members of the public complained to have been told that the tug, having been visited by many during its nearly 25 years on display, had been put into 'storage' when this was not the case.
