= PS John H Amos =

Paddlewheel tugboat

Coordinates: 51.405242°N 0.549926°E

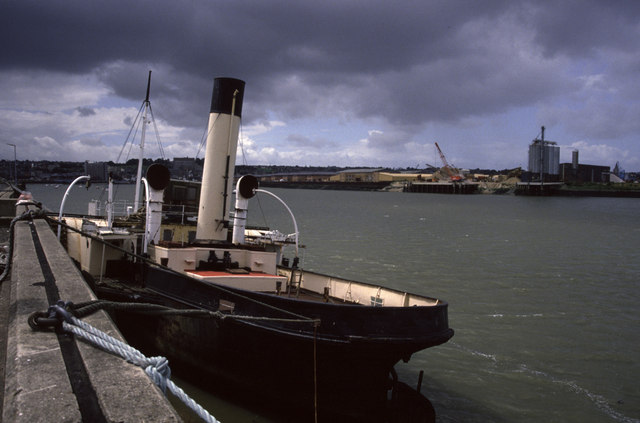
- John H Amos in 1988

History

United Kingdom
- Name: John H Amos
- Owner: Tees Conservancy Commissioners
- Port of registry: Middlesbrough; London
- Ordered: 1931
- Builder: Bow, McLachlan & Co, Paisley, Scotland
- Cost: £18,500
- Yard number: 497
- Launched: 26 December 1930
- In service: 1931
- Home port: Chatham, Kent
- Status: Non-operational, on barge

General characteristics
- Type: Tugboat
- Tonnage: 202 tons
- Length: 110 ft (34 m)
- Beam: 22.5 ft (6.9 m); (paddle to paddle) 43 ft (13 m)
- Installed power: Nominal Horsepower: 126hp; Indicated Horsepower: 500hp
- Propulsion: 2 diagonal compound engines with Bremme valve gear
- Speed: 13 knots (24 km/h)
- Crew: 6

John H Amos is a paddlewheel tugboat built in Scotland in 1931. The last paddlewheel tug built for private owners, now owned by the Medway Maritime Trust, she is one of only two surviving British-built paddle tugs, the other being Eppleton Hall preserved at the San Francisco Maritime National Historical Park in San Francisco, California.

== Construction ==
John H Amos was commissioned for the River Tees Conservancy Commissioners and built by Bow, McLachlan and Company Ltd. of Paisley, Scotland. She was named to honour of the Secretary to the Commissioners, John Hetherington Amos who died in 1934. Before completion Bow, McLachlan & Co. went into liquidation and its yard was taken over by National Shipbuilders Securities (NSS). NSS finished the work by using materials that were already available in the yard, which resulted in a variation to design specification: some parts were therefore better, while others were worse.

On first steaming, it was discovered that the boilers used could not supply enough steam for the diagonal compound engines, meaning she could only reach 11 knots instead of the intended 13 knots. She was completed in 1931 but the Tees Conservancy Commissioners did not accept her for another two years before remedial work was completed to bring her up to design specification.

== Operations ==
Between 1940 and 1967, the period covered by the Daily Towage Records at Teesside Archives, she took barges to dredgers and the dumping grounds, towed dredgers which had no propulsion of their own, and transferred the crews. She had a crew of six: master, mate, two engineers (one for each engine), a stoker and a deck hand.

Said to have been an inefficient boat as a tug, she was given a certificate for 144 passengers to make her more useful. In the mouth of the River Tees was pier known as the Fifth Buoy Light: when approaching the river, ships had the two lights in line they knew they were on the right course. In the middle of the structure was a building described as a dance hall, which belonged to the Tees Commissioners, which the John H Amos was used to transport passengers to.

There were regular incidents of alcohol smuggling on the Tees, and in 1959 the boat was arrested for smuggling, having towed some off-shore barges into the river. The master was changed for a period, and the boat taken to court, although no individual was eventually charged.

Like all paddle steamers she had a shallow draught. When towing barges, they were always lashed alongside, and she would normally use only one paddle. Although wide, the configuration allowed efficient operation in shallow draught water, and hence why she worked for so long.

=== First period of preservation ===
Withdrawn from service in 1967, two years later she was presented by the Tees and Hartlepool Ports Authority to the County Borough of Teesside for "The People of Cleveland." In December 1971 she was moved from Middlesbrough to Stockton Corporation Quay, with a plan using trainees to convert the tug into a floating museum.

=== 1976–99 ===
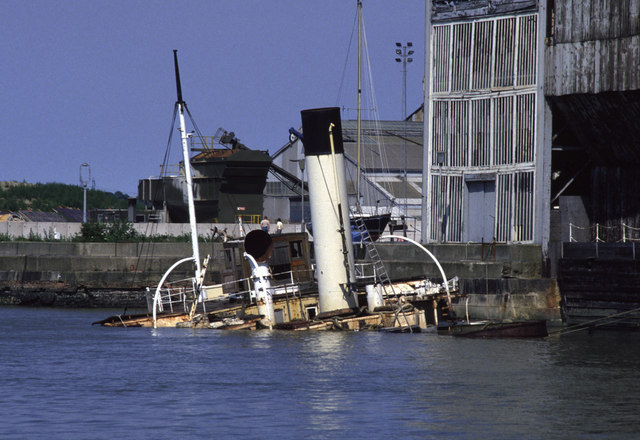
John H Amos in 1994

As a result of UK Government reorganisation of funding, the youth project based restoration was withdrawn and the boat put up for sale. Two River Thames based businessmen, who operated the UK's only steam powered tug fleet, purchased the boat for £3,500. After a dispute within the council at the sale, she left Stockton watched by a crowd of 400 to the accompaniment of Rule Britannia played by a local brass band on 4 March 1976.

Renamed Hero she became part of the fleet of International Towing Ltd (ITL), based at Gun Wharf, Chatham Dockyard. By the end of 1976, the partners split the ITL fleet, and John H Amos moved from Gun Wharf to Milton Creek, and then Faversham Creek.

When HMS Endurance returned from the Falklands War, the Royal Navy offered the newly formed Medway Maritime Trust two buoys on which to moor their two boats.

=== Second period of preservation ===
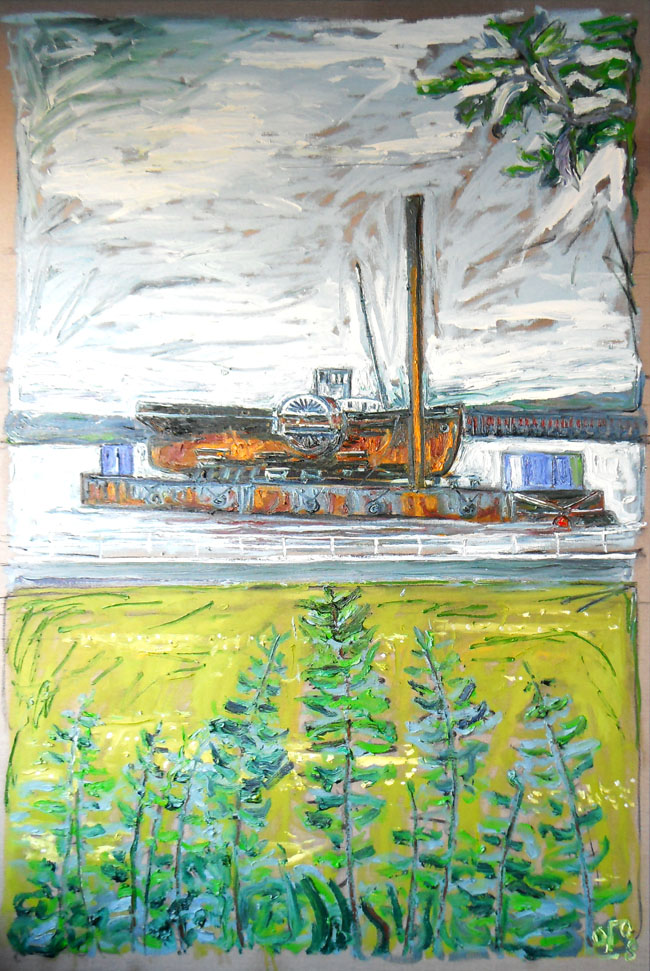
John H Amos by Billy Childish, a painting of the paddle tug off Rochester in 2008.

John H Amos hence moved to Anchor Wharf, Historic Dockyard. When the Dockyard Trust acquired the submarine HMS Ocelot, John H Amos was moved to a new berth at which she sat on a submerged lump of concrete. Resultantly holed, she sank at her mooring. Happily, the dockyard trust then agreed she could be moored on a free slipway.

In November 1999, John H Amos was listed as part of the National Historic Fleet as a vessel of "Pre-eminent National Significance" and among the most worthy vessels for preservation.

In 2001 the ownership was transferred to the Medway Maritime Trust, with funding from the Science Museum. Restoration grant aid was given from the Heritage Lottery Fund, National Historic Ships and Rochester Bridge Trust.

Due to be slipped in 2004, timing and contractual delays meant she stayed on the slipway. In 2006, the trust acquired Portal Narvik, the remains of the former Tank Landing Ship HMS Narvik. After earning monies to pay for the lift of John H Amos, in May 2009 one of the largest sea cranes in Europe, the GPS Atlas, lifted John H Amos onto Portal Narvik.

The pair are now moored alongside, in Chatham Docks, where the vessel is to be cleaned and comprehensively recorded, awaiting restoration funds. In 2008, Chatham-born artist Billy Childish made several paintings of the John H Amos, one of which shows the tug safely aboard the Portal Narvik pontoon, moored mid-river.
