= Greg Dobbs (journalist) =

American journalist

Greg Dobbs (born October 9, 1946) is a retired ABC News television correspondent and Denver newspaper columnist.

== Early life and education ==
Dobbs was born October 9, 1946 in San Francisco, the third of five children born to Annette (née Lehrer) and Harold Dobbs. He earned degrees from the University of California at Berkeley and Northwestern University.

== Career ==
Dobbs began working as a correspondent for ABC News in 1969. Over his time with ABC, he worked as a foreign correspondent based in London, then Paris, and later was assigned to ABC's Denver bureau. His reporting appeared on World News, Nightline, 20/20, and Good Morning America, he won two national Emmys and was nominated for more.

Beginning in 2004, Dobbs was a correspondent for HDNet television's documentary-style HDNet World Report. He also provided live reports, along with Dan Rather, on primary and general election nights in 2008, and also covered the U.S. space program for HDNet, anchoring live from Florida for every space shuttle launch after the Columbia disaster. Between ABC and HDNet, Dobbs has reported from more than 80 countries around the world.

He has covered presidencies, politics, and the U.S. space program at home, and wars, natural disasters, and other crises around the globe, from Afghanistan to South Africa, from Iran to Egypt, from the Soviet Union to Saudi Arabia, from Nicaragua to Namibia, from Vietnam to Venezuela, from Libya to Liberia, from Panama to Poland.

Many of his adventures and experiences, seeing the world at its best but also at its worst, are recounted in his book "Life in the Wrong Lane."

In addition to his time with television networks, Dobbs hosted a radio talk show on Denver station KOA from 1993 to 1997 and was the morning-drive host on the short-lived KNRC.

He has been a columnist for The Denver Post, the defunct Rocky Mountain News (2001-2002), and syndicated for the Scripps Howard News Service. From 2003 to 2009, he hosted the television program Colorado State of Mind on Rocky Mountain PBS, for which he won another Emmy.

He also has been a consultant for the Counterterrorism Education Learning Lab.

He has been publishing on the online platform Substack since 2021.

== Publications ==
- Better Broadcast Writing, Better Broadcast News. Milton Park: Routledge (2005). ISBN 9780205359943.
- Life in the Wrong Lane. Bloomington: iUniverse (2009). ISBN 9781440152764.
- “1969: Are You Still Listening?”

== Awards ==
Dobbs has won two national Emmy Awards for "Best Spot News Coverage on a Network" and "Best Network Documentary". He was awarded his first Emmy for his reporting on southern Italy's 1980 Irpinia earthquake. He won a second Emmy in 1989 for Burning Questions: The Poisoning of America, an ABC News special that aired in September 1988.

He is the recipient of the Distinguished Service Award from the Society of Professional Journalists and was inducted into the Denver Press Club Hall of Fame in 2017.

== Personal life ==
Dobbs has a daughter and two sons. He and his wife Carol live in Colorado. He is active on community non-profit boards. He also has worked in Vail, Colorado for the past ten years with a unit that patrols the slopes and helps injured skiers as an arm of ski patrol.
