= Alvin Duskin =

American educator, entrepreneur, and activist (1931–2021)

- Born: 1931; San Francisco
- Died: 25 July 2021 (aged 90)
- Education: Stanford University; San Francisco State
- Occupations: Founder of Alvin Duskin Company; Co-founder of Corigin Solutions
- Spouse(s): Constance Slater (1951); Sara Urquhart (1970)
- Children: 6

Alvin Duskin (1931 – July 25, 2021) was a San Francisco Bay Area educator, entrepreneur, and activist known for leading a series of campaigns in the 1970s. These initiatives included anti-highrise ads, a battle to stop the sale of Alcatraz Island to a Texas oilman, and an initiative that prevented the development of nuclear power plants in California. Duskin collaborated with journalists, activists, and ad-men in these efforts.

He was the founder of the Alvin Duskin Company, a women's fashion label established in the 1960s. The brand achieved national distribution and funded many of Duskin's anti-war and environmental campaigns. In the later stages of his career, he founded or co-founded start-ups, and was CEO in wind, hydro, conservation, and food companies. Father of David Duskin, Ceres Rutan, Zoe Duskin, and grandfather of Lakan Duskin, Adlaw Duskin, Mojave Rutan, Lucia Rutan, Max Abrams, Henry Abrams, and Bruce Abrams (descendants shared with his wife, Sara), and children Marcus Duskin, Laura Duskin, Sarah Floyd, and grandfather of Matthew Wilson, Bryce Wilson, Luke Wilson, Lena Wilson, and Daniel Floyd (descendants shared with his first wife, Connie).

== Early life and education ==
Duskin was born in San Francisco in 1931, went to public school, and worked in his family's sweater factory as a teenager. He enrolled at Stanford University in 1948. He was born in San Francisco's Portola district, the son of parents who operated a local apparel factory. He was a yell leader at Balboa High School and remained connected to the school community throughout his life.

As an undergraduate, he was an English major. After two years, he transferred to San Francisco State, where he met his first wife, Constance Slater. They were married in 1951. He returned to Stanford as a graduate student, studying for a PhD in philosophy.

After his first year of graduate school, Duskin's funding under the G.I. Bill ran out. He became a part-time graduate student and took a job selling his family's sweaters to stores in Northern California. Duskin and Slater's first child, Marcus, was born in 1953, and his second child, Laura, was born in 1956.

By 1958, Duskin realized there were no job opportunities for philosophy teachers at four-year colleges and universities, so he decided to earn a teaching credential as a graduate student at San Francisco State. After a semester of classes and student teaching, he was offered a faculty position at SF State teaching freshman English.

Early in 1960, Duskin was one of the founders of Emerson College formed in Pacific Grove on the Monterey Peninsula located in a Victorian Mansion. Emerson would be part of a group of "free schools" on a plateau above Point Lobos that would be called Walden West. He called another founder, Mark Goldes; met with him; and, at 29 years of age, accepted a position as Dean of Emerson College and philosophy teach. After the first year, as the school began receiving public recognition, he became president of the college and chairman of its Board of Fellows.

The college then moved to San Francisco and the name was changed to San Francisco New School, to avoid confusion with Emerson College of Boston. In its new, urban environment, the college attracted many more students; and faculty volunteered to teach on a part-time basis.

== The Alvin Duskin Company ==
In 1961, his third child, Sarah, was born. With three children, Duskin needed a better income and was offered a position as head of the Summerhill School, which was to be formed in New York. He accepted the job, but the start date was delayed until 1965. To cover a year's loss of income he started a small store to sell women's sweaters with the intention of returning to teaching in a year.

Early in the life of his store, a woman came in and said she had seen knit dresses at a downtown San Francisco store that looked like his sweaters. She suggested Alvin might want to lengthen his sweaters and market them as dresses. He took her advice. The dresses began regularly selling out. He founded The Alvin Duskin Company to make and sell dresses and the company quickly became a success.

Duskin decided to build his brand into a women's clothing company with national distribution. Over the next seven years he expanded his factory and staff. His dresses were a hit with young, hip women. One, the Peace Dress, which had peace symbols knit into the fabric, was called in the New York Times, "the fastest-selling dress in history." Stores such as Bloomingdale's and Macy's created Alvin Duskin departments.

== Political activism ==
Duskin was managing two disparate careers: one, as a capitalist dress manufacturer, and another, that of a left-leaning social activist. He became well known in the Bay Area through his environmental campaigns and anti-war activities. His allies in these battles ranged from San Francisco ad executives to organizations like the War Resisters League.

Among the campaigns he led were the stopping the sale of Alcatraz Island to a Texas oilman, blocking the construction of the Peripheral Canal to take Northern California water and deliver it to Southern California, supporting GI coffee houses, and organizing anti-war rallies in Golden Gate Park and the Marin County Civic Center. He also was involved in delaying the construction of the Yerba Buena Center—until housing was provided for displaced residents of the South-of-Market neighborhood—and organizing the anti high-rise campaigns in San Francisco, to maintain the livability of the city.

As part of his new success, Duskin moved his family into a large house in the Haight-Ashbury neighborhood. He also bought a weekend house in the Carmel Highlands where, by a critical coincidence, his next-door neighbor was the legendary political organizer, Saul Alinsky.

== The end of the Alvin Duskin Company ==
By 1971, Duskin was ready to leave the garment business and focus on political and environmental work. The Alvin Duskin Company was sold—under terms that proved to be unfavorable.

Duskin accepted a position as the organizer of The California Project for Saul Alinsky's Industrial Areas Foundation, a part-time job that included establishing a school in Berkeley for community organizers. He also joined Public Interest Communication, a non-profit advertising agency with clients like Planned Parenthood and Greenpeace and became its managing director.

After a second year, he left the agency and organized a statewide initiative to limit the development of nuclear power plants in California. The initiative failed at the polls, but Duskin included its key provisions in the Nuclear Safeguards Act, which the California legislature passed. Planned nuclear plants were cancelled and existing plants eventually shut down. The success of the campaign led to Alvin's appointment as a director of the Union of Concerned Scientists.

== Stopping the sale of Alcatraz ==
At the end of the 1960s, Texas billionaire Lamar Hunt presented a proposal, to the Surplus Property Commission, to completely redevelop Alcatraz and install a monument to the Apollo missions and a Victorian theme park. The commission accepted Hunt's proposal and approved the sale.

Hearing about the idea, Duskin took out full-page ads in local newspapers, starting a campaign that proclaimed the deal "As Big a Steal as Manhattan Island". His campaign was successful and the commission rescinded the sale, and a group of Native Americans moved onto the island. In May 1971, the General Services Administration announced that it planned to transfer Alcatraz to the Department of the Interior; and, in 1972, the Golden Gate National Recreation Area was created. Alcatraz was opened by the National Park Service for public tours, beginning in October 1973.

== Second marriage ==
In 1970, Duskin married Sara Urquhart, a Scottish woman who had worked with him as the head of the design department at the dress company, after several years managing the chain of high-fashion stores, Paraphernalia. They had three children: Ceres, David, and Zoe.

== Skyscraper campaign ==
In 1971, Duskin started a ballot measure called Proposition T, which would have limited the height of buildings in San Francisco to 72 feet. Duskin compared high rises to "tombstones", and said that "the city was being controlled by developers". He took out full-page newspaper ads publicly denouncing turning San Francisco into "a skyline of tombstones"^{]} and predicting "The Manhattanization of San Francisco", with dramatic photos comparing the low San Francisco skyline to New York City's mighty towers. It prompted broader public debate over the role of residents in urban planning decisions.

The mayor at the time, Joseph Alioto, called him an "irresponsible extremist". Duskin's measure ultimately failed, with only 37.8% of voters supporting the proposal. Duskin launched another referendum in June 1972, which would have imposed limits 60 feet. That initiative garnered 43.2% approval of voters.

Duskin announced that he would launch a third initiative that specified a limit of 40 feet, and that voters were clearly moving to a majority anti-high rise position. In 1973, the San Francisco board of supervisors voted to limit building heights in the residential neighborhoods, permitting skyscrapers only in the downtown financial districts.

== Time in Washington ==
In 1977, Duskin became a senior aide for energy legislation in the US Senate, working in the office of Senator James Abourezk of South Dakota. In that position he wrote the amendments to the Windfall Profits Tax Act that established a 15% tax credit on the price of wind and solar equipment. As there was already a 10% tax credit on the purchase of any business equipment, the combined 25% credit was crucial to the launch of the wind and solar industries.

== Moving into private industry ==
In 1979, Duskin left the Senate and co-founded US Windpower. He moved back to California and uncovered, before any of his competitors, a government study identifying Altamont Pass as the ideal location in California for wind farms. Duskin leased land in the Altamont Pass where US Windpower built one of the first wind farms in the United States.

In 1983, Duskin accepted a position as CEO of Northern Power, a specialist in remote power for telecommunications and defense. Northern built projects in Antarctica, Pakistan, and Norway. In 1986, he decided to leave the wind business and work on the lessening of Cold War tensions by developing joint ventures with industrial firms in the Soviet Union.

With John Eastwood, an expert in hydropower, he formed the Bering Company and partnered with Electrosila and Leningrad Metal Works in a joint venture that built hydropower stations on the Hudson River and for the city of Tacoma, Washington. Operations were put on a hold when the Soviet Union was dissolved and the future of the joint venture became uncertain.

To maintain a presence in Eastern Europe, Alvin formed the Copernican Group and raised funds to buy PPZ—a cereals-and-potato processing company located in Toruń, Poland—from the Polish federal government in Warsaw. He led the company, renamed Torun Pacific, for three years and then sold the potato side to Phanni of Germany and the cereal side to Nestle of Switzerland and General Mills of Minneapolis.

The joint venture in Russia could not be revived. He stopped his monthly commutes to Europe and spent the next years full-time with his wife Sara and their children in San Francisco. He organized a cooperative research-and-development agreement to develop flywheel energy technology with the Lawrence Livermore National Laboratory and, when that was not successful, a joint-development project with the combustion-engineering department at Stanford University.

With James Boettcher and Michael Woelk, he co-founded Corigin Solutions, a California company, to produce and market biochar, a soil-additive that holds water and carbon in farm soil, reducing the amount of water needed for farm irrigation, and sequestering atmospheric carbon dioxide.

Duskin resided in the tiny town of Tomales on the Northern California coast, completing a biography that chronicles his many adventures. In his later years, he continued to pursue new projects, both socialist and capitalist. He died on July 25, 2021.

== See also ==
- Midpeninsula Free University
