= Joseph Alioto =

36th Mayor of San Francisco from 1968 to 1976

Joseph L. Alioto
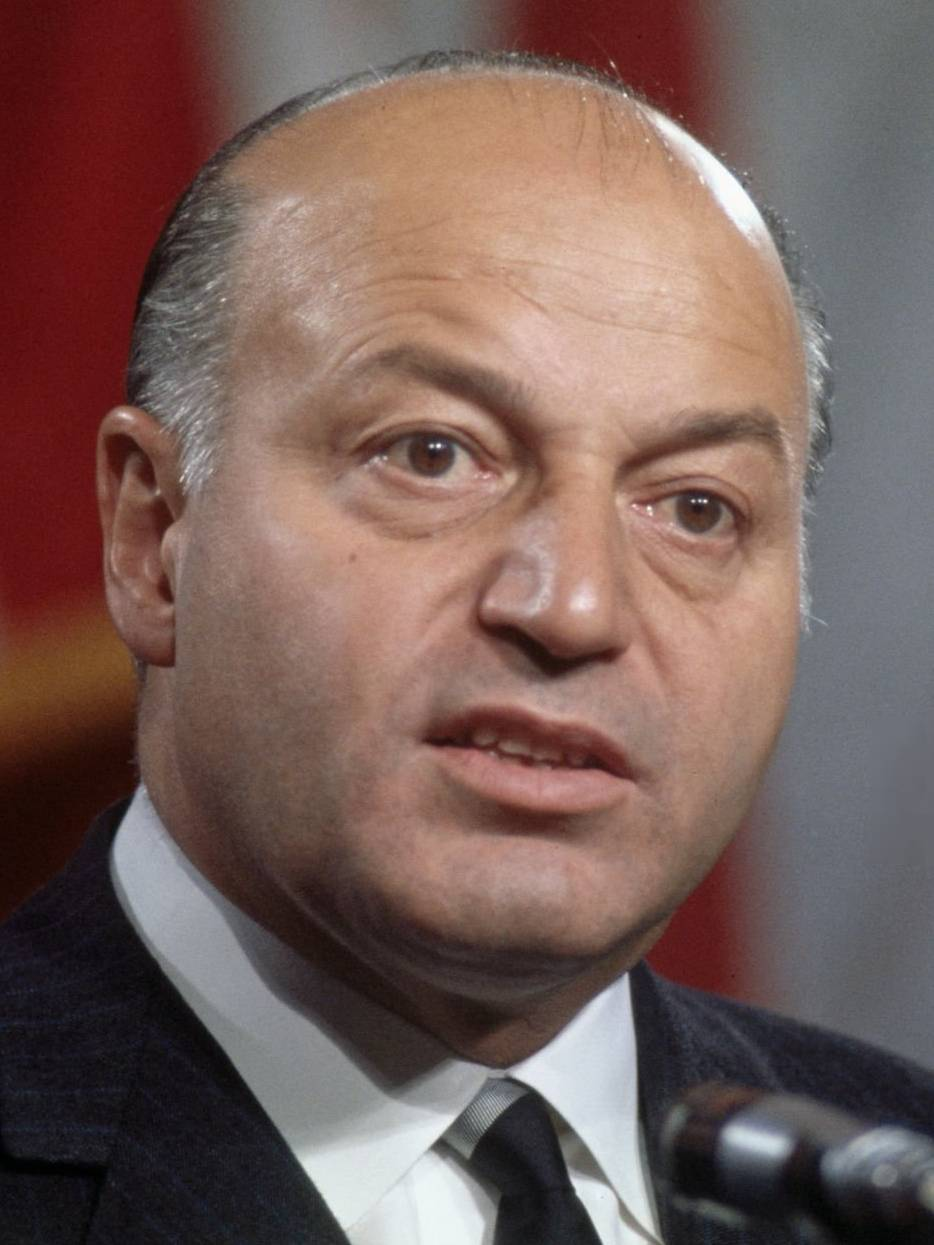
- Alioto in 1968

36th Mayor of San Francisco
- In office January 8, 1968 – January 8, 1976
- Preceded by: John F. Shelley
- Succeeded by: George Moscone

32nd President of the United States Conference of Mayors
- In office 1974–1975
- Preceded by: Roy Martin
- Succeeded by: Moon Landrieu

Personal details
- Born: Joseph Lawrence Alioto; February 12, 1916 San Francisco, California, U.S.
- Died: January 29, 1998 (aged 81) San Francisco, California, U.S.
- Party: Democratic
- Spouses: Angelina Genaro (m. 1941; div. 1977) Kathleen Sullivan (m. 1978)
- Children: 8 (including Angela Alioto)

Joseph Lawrence Alioto (February 12, 1916 – January 29, 1998) was an American politician who served as the 36th mayor of San Francisco, California, from 1968 to 1976.

== Biography ==
Alioto was born in San Francisco in 1916. His father, Giuseppe Alioto, was a Sicilian immigrant who owned and operated several fish processing companies. His mother, Domenica Mae Lazio, was born in San Francisco. His parents met on a fishing boat while escaping the 1906 San Francisco earthquake.

=== Education ===
He attended Sacred Heart High School (presently Sacred Heart Cathedral Preparatory). He graduated with honors from St. Mary's College, Moraga, California, in 1937 and from law school at The Catholic University of America with honors in 1940.

=== Law practice ===
Alioto worked for the Antitrust Division of the Justice Department and then for the Board of Economic Warfare. He returned to San Francisco after World War II and started an antitrust practice, representing Walt Disney and Samuel Goldwyn, among others, eventually becoming a millionaire. He was on the briefs in Radovich v. National Football League and argued Continental Ore Co. v. Union Carbide & Carbon Corp., 370 U.S. 690 (1962), an antitrust landmark, and Utah Pie Co. v. Continental Baking Co., 386 U.S. 685 (1967), all three Supreme Court of the United States cases. In Radovich, the Supreme Court held that professional football, unlike baseball, was subject to antitrust laws. Continental Ore is one of the most comprehensive and important antitrust cases ever decided by the Supreme Court.

In 1980, he represented Al Davis and the Oakland Raiders in a landmark antitrust case entitled Los Angeles Coliseum Commission v. The NFL. The case established the right of football franchises to move to football markets throughout the United States without the approval of other franchise owners. In 1993, he represented his father-in-law Billy Sullivan in his lawsuit against the NFL. The court ruled that Sullivan was forced by the league to sell his team at below market value and awarded him $114 million.

=== Early government career ===
Alioto served on the San Francisco Board of Education from 1948 to 1954; and in 1955, he served as the first Chairman of the San Francisco Redevelopment Agency.

== Mayoralty ==
Alioto signed on as campaign finance chairman for the mayoral candidacy of California State Senator J. Eugene McAteer in the 1967 San Francisco mayoral election. When McAteer collapsed and died while playing a game of handball, Alioto entered the race. John Shelley, the incumbent, bowed out, allegedly because of poor health but possibly because Alioto was more pro-development than Shelley; additionally, Shelley was expected to lose a re-match against his 1963 opponent, Republican Harold Dobbs. Alioto defeated Dobbs, 44.2%-37.8%, in an 18-candidate field. He was reelected in 1971.

Alioto delivered the speech nominating Hubert Humphrey at the 1968 Democratic National Convention. There were rumors that Humphrey would select Alioto as his running mate, but Humphrey selected Edmund Muskie.

An article in the September 23, 1969, issue of Look magazine claimed that Alioto had business and personal ties to six leaders of "La Cosa Nostra", including Jimmy "The Weasel" Fratianno and Frank Bompensiero, both of whom were FBI informants. Alioto sued Look for over $12 million, claiming that he did not know any of the men named in the article and had never had dealings with them.

The case was fraught with complications and took nearly eight years to resolve; the FBI was unwilling to corroborate facts they knew to be true because they were fearful of giving away their informants, and the courts were struggling to apply the standard of "actual malice" on statements that appeared to be false. After the first three rounds all resulted in a hung jury, Alioto was ultimately awarded a $350,000 judgment. This judgment was based on just one claim, a story about a series of meetings at the Nut Tree Restaurant in Vacaville, California that appeared to have been fabricated by the magazine's source. The magazine knew they could not verify this part of the story but published it anyway, leading the court to determine that claims were made "with reckless disregard for their truth".

Alioto maintained that he did not know the mafia figures listed and that the article was planted by political opponents looking to injure his career. FBI documents later acquired by the San Diego Union demonstrated that Alioto was indeed connected to the underworld and had lied repeatedly under oath, but Alioto won his appeals in court and was never charged with perjury.

In January 1970, the State of Washington, three cities, a port authority, and eight public utilities brought a civil suit against Alioto because he split a $2.3 million fee in an antitrust case with Washington State Attorney General John J. O'Connell and an O’Connell deputy, George Faler. Attorney General O’Connell had maintained Public Utility Districts as private clients during his time as AG. The Public Utility Districts were suing electrical manufacturers that were fixing prices at an improperly high level. The case began in 1962 and O’Connell retained Alioto, a very successful anti-trust attorney, to work on the case. Originally, Alioto agreed to receive 15% of what was awarded with a $1 million cap. Later, O’Connell, apparently without telling his clients, abolished the fee ceiling. Alioto ended up receiving approximately $2.3 million and gave $802,815 of it to O’Connell and Faler. The state and other groups sued to have the entire $2.3 million returned; Alioto successfully sought a change of venue from Washington to San Francisco. The trial took six months and jury unanimously found the three were entitled to the $2.3 million.

Alioto was also indicted by a federal grand jury in March 1971 on bribery charges because of the means by which the fees were awarded. When the case went to court, Alioto was cleared of the federal charges by a judge who ordered acquittal because he was convinced a jury would not convict when it considered the evidence.

Under California law it was illegal for public employees to strike. Nevertheless, city employees called a strike in March 1974, picketing City Hall and shutting down municipal services. After a week Mayor Alioto and the San Francisco Board of Supervisors agreed to the strikers' demands. The city controller, however, refused to pay out what he believed were illegal salaries. In April 1975 the California Supreme Court ordered the city controller to pay the salaries, with Justice Mathew Tobriner finding that contracts secured through illegal strikes are still legally enforceable.

Major crime became a problem with the Zodiac Killer, the Symbionese Liberation Army attacks and the Black Power Zebra Murders all occurring during Alioto's mayoralty.

During the Zebra Murders in 1974, Alioto's wife, Angelina Alioto, vanished, reappearing after 18 days to claim that she had taken off to "punish" her husband for neglect. During the time Angelina was missing, she toured the missions of California as part of a religious pilgrimage. Angelina filed divorce proceedings against him in 1975. He remarried in 1978.

Alioto ran in the 1974 Democratic primary for governor, finishing second behind Jerry Brown.

In July 1975 the LAPD unexpectedly announced a pay raise. For years the San Francisco Police Department had been the top paid in the state, with the San Francisco Fire Department guaranteed the same pay. The SF police promptly demanded they be paid more than the LAPD. The Board of Supervisors, however, determined that the pay raise would drive the city into deficit, and unanimously approved a raise only half of what the police requested.

California law still prohibited public employees from striking. The police and firefighters elected to strike anyway, with 90% illegally abandoning their posts.

The city then obtained a court order declaring the strike illegal and enjoining the officers to return to work. The court messenger delivering the order was met with violence and the police continued to strike.

Only managers and African-American officers remained, with 45 officers and 3 fire trucks responsible for the whole city. Supervisor Dianne Feinstein pleaded for Mayor Alioto to ask Governor Jerry Brown to call out the National Guard to patrol the streets but Alioto refused.

When enraged citizens confronted police at the picket lines the police arrested them. Federal authorities were forced to intervene after striking firefighters attempted to seize San Francisco International Airport. Heavy drinking on the picket line became common and after striking police officers started shooting out streetlights the ACLU obtained a court order prohibiting strikers from carrying their service revolvers. Again, the police ignored the court order.

On August 20 a bomb detonated at the Mayor's home with a sign reading "Don’t Threaten Us" left on his lawn. On August 21 Mayor Alioto advised the Supervisors that they should concede to the strikers' demands. The Supervisors unanimously refused. Mayor Alioto then immediately declared a state of emergency, assumed "legislative powers", and granted the strikers’ demands.

The Supervisors and taxpayers sued but the court reaffirmed that contracts obtained through illegal strikes are still legally enforceable. Nevertheless, the Supervisors placed on the November ballot charter initiatives revoking the mayor's emergency powers, requiring police to be automatically fired if they strike, preventing firemen from holding second jobs, and requiring future pay raises to be averaged with California's other large cities. All the ballot initiatives passed by extremely large margins.

In 1974 and 1975, Alioto served as president of the United States Conference of Mayors.

== Later life ==
After he left office, Alioto went back into private practice. He and his son Joseph Jr. lost a major malpractice case against a cattle rancher in 1980. He received millions in legal fees after counseling the Oakland Raiders win against the City of Oakland. In 1991, he and his son went to battle in court against each other over legal fees in the Raiders case.

=== Death ===
Alioto died of prostate cancer in San Francisco on January 29, 1998, and was interred at Cypress Lawn Cemetery in Colma, California. A cenotaph is located at Holy Cross Cemetery (Section D).

== Legacy ==
Alioto presided over a time of turmoil and change in San Francisco. Events that occurred during his mayoralty included strife in the Haight-Ashbury with the drug culture, anti-Vietnam War demonstrations, the start of the gay Castro District, Black Panther marches, the racially motivated Zebra murders and Zodiac killings. He ran on a platform of reducing taxes and fighting crime.

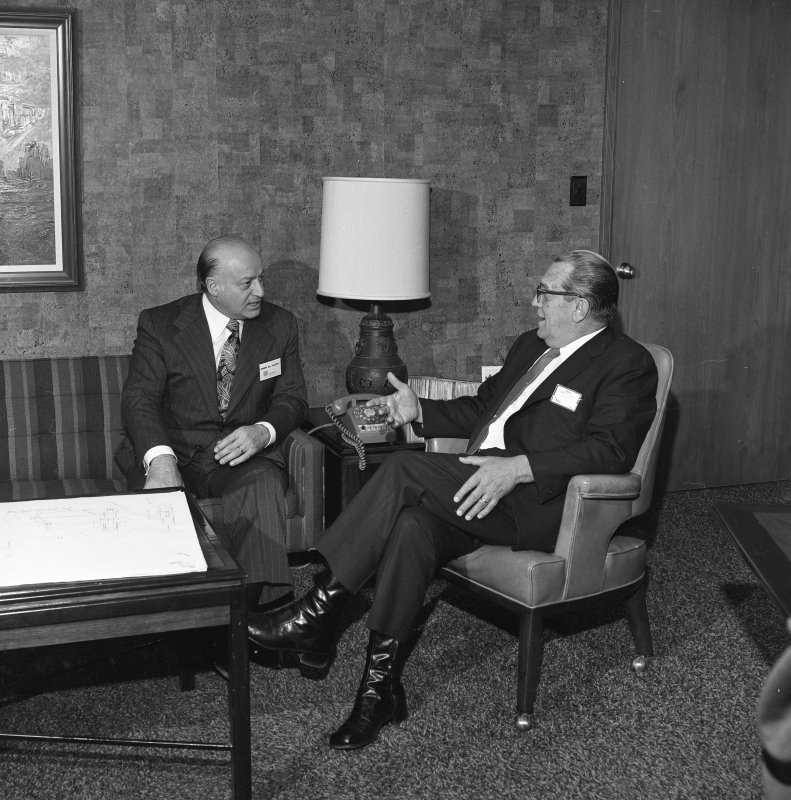
Alioto visiting Rohr, Inc., who built Bay Area Rapid Transit original rolling stock, 23 March 1973

Alioto promoted the development of three major building projects: the Bay Area Rapid Transit (BART) system; the Transamerica Pyramid; and the Embarcadero Center. These efforts engendered opposition in the development stage but were eventually built, transforming the infrastructure and skyline of San Francisco.

Alioto helped to bring more minorities into city politics, launched a reform of the city charter, and mediated protracted police and fire department strikes in 1975. Alioto's mayoralty began, 8 January 1968, with a 52-day citywide newspaper strike of the San Francisco Chronicle and the San Francisco Examiner that ended in February 1968. The first faculty strike at a college or university in the United States was at San Francisco State College, now San Francisco State University, during 1968–1969; Alioto gave the law enforcement resources of the City and County of San Francisco to the university president, S.I. Hayakawa.

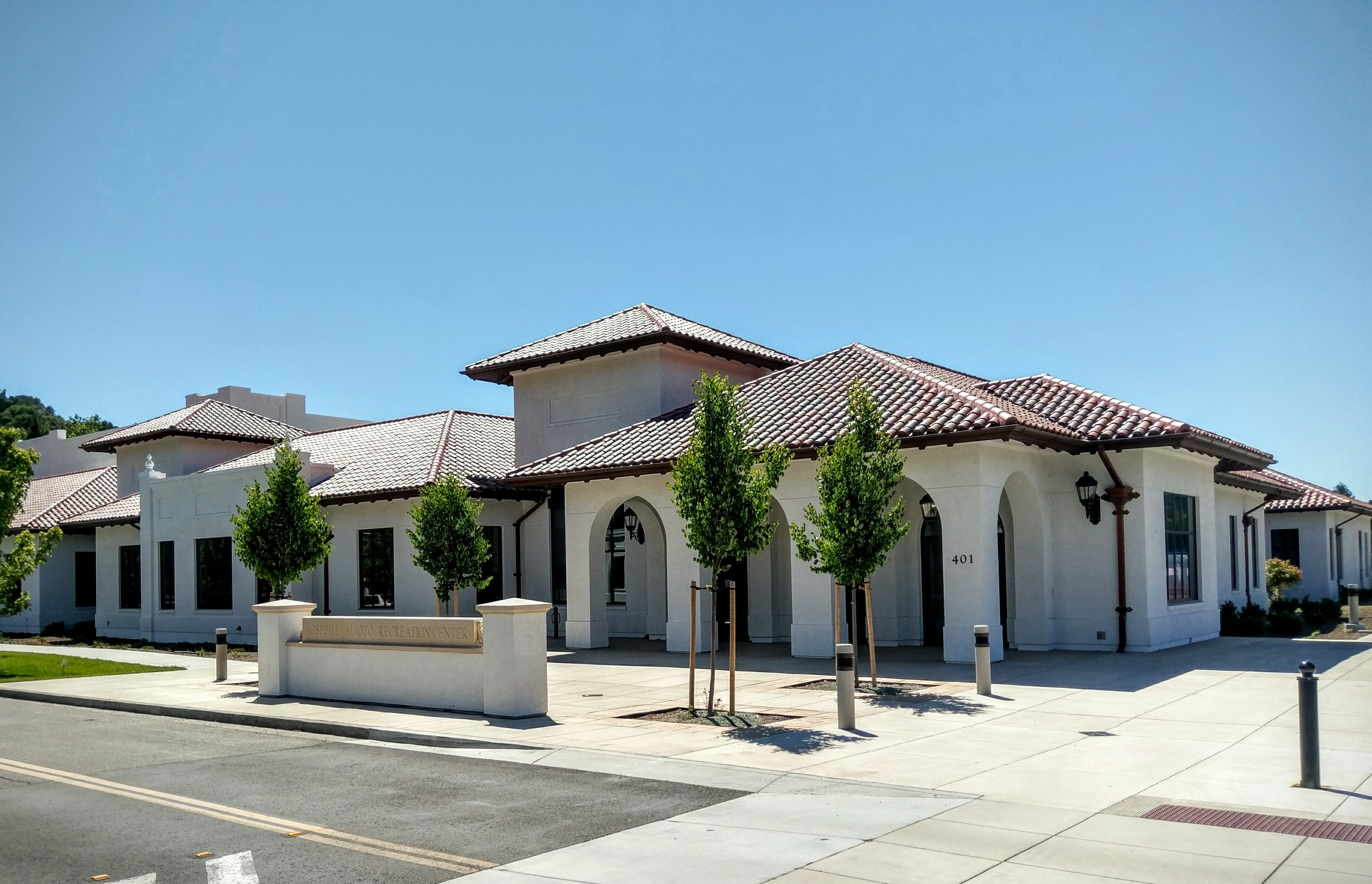
Joseph L. Alioto Recreation Center

The Joseph L. Alioto Recreation Center at his alma mater, Saint Mary's College in Moraga, California, opened in 2015 and is named after him. The privately funded facility cost $23.5 million, and includes an outdoor aquatics center, indoor exercise equipment, a rock climbing wall, and a cafe. The center serves the general student body, while varsity athletes use separate dedicated training facilities. After his death, the Civic Center Plaza in San Francisco was dedicated as the "Joseph L. Alioto Performing Arts Piazza" on October 28, 1998.

Alioto Park is a mini park and community garden named for him at 490 Capp Street in the Mission District, owned by the San Francisco Recreation and Parks Department.

== Alioto family ==
Alioto had five sons and a daughter with his first wife Angelina Genaro, and a son and daughter with his second wife Kathleen Sullivan.

Members of Alioto's family are still involved in San Francisco politics. His second wife, Kathleen Sullivan Alioto, was a member of the Boston School committee and a candidate for a United States Senate seat in Massachusetts in the 1978 primary. Sullivan and Alioto married in 1978 and remained together until his death in 1998. Because they were both divorced, the wedding was performed by excommunicated Catholic priest and activist Joseph O'Rourke.

Angela Alioto, the daughter from his first marriage, served eight years as a member of the San Francisco Board of Supervisors, two as its president. One of Angela's three sons, Joe Alioto Veronese, campaigned for a California State Senate seat in 2008. One of his granddaughters, Michela Alioto-Pier, was appointed to the Board of Supervisors in 2003 by San Francisco mayor Gavin Newsom and won election to the Board in 2004. His grandson Joseph Alioto Jr. ran an unsuccessful bid for a seat on the San Francisco Board of Supervisors in District 3. Several of his sons, as well as many of his grandchildren, are successful attorneys and businesspersons in the San Francisco Bay Area.

Political offices
Preceded by John F. Shelley	Mayor of San Francisco; 1968–1976	Succeeded by George Moscone
