= Harold Dobbs =

American businessman (1918–1994)

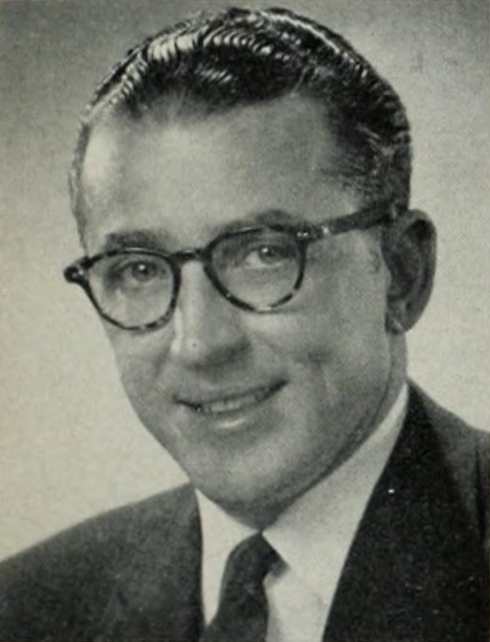
- Dobbs c. 1957

Member of the San Francisco Board of Supervisors from the at-large district
- In office January 8, 1952 – January 8, 1964
- Preceded by: J. Joseph Sullivan
- Succeeded by: Leo T. McCarthy

Personal details
- Born: December 8, 1918 Roselle, New Jersey
- Died: August 14, 1994 (aged 75) San Francisco, California
- Party: Republican
- Spouse: Annette Dobbs (m. 1941)

Harold Stanley Dobbs (December 8, 1918 – August 14, 1994) was an influential civic leader in San Francisco, California. He was a lawyer, businessman, politician, and leader in the Jewish community, founding Mel's Drive-In and serving as president of San Francisco's Board of Supervisors.

== Early life and education ==
Dobbs was born in 1918 in Roselle, New Jersey, to George Dobbs and Mary Dobbs (née Wolin), both Russian Jews who had emigrated to the United States in the early twentieth century. He attended Roselle's Jefferson High School for one year before his family moved to San Diego in 1934, in search of work for Dobbs' father George, who was a carpenter. Dobbs finished high school at San Diego High School and then attended San Diego State College for two years, becoming the first member of his family to attend college.

In 1939, the Dobbs family moved once more to San Francisco, where George Dobbs hoped to find work at the Golden Gate International Exposition on Treasure Island. Despite not having graduated from college, Harold Dobbs enrolled at Hastings College of the Law in San Francisco, which at the time did not require its students to have college degrees. Dobbs graduated from Hastings and passed the California Bar Examination in 1942.

Asthma kept Dobbs out of the military during World War II, but he worked as a clerk at his local Selective Service office during the war.

== Career ==
Dobbs had a long and distinguished career that included multiple professions. Time Magazine recognized his potential early when they recognized Dobbs as one of the "100 Young Leaders of Tomorrow" in 1952.

=== Law ===
After graduating law school in 1942, Dobbs was hired by the law firm Lillick, Geary, Olson, Adams, & Charles, becoming the firm's first Jewish lawyer and first Hastings graduate. He remained there until 1956, when he left to establish his own firm with William Ferdon, called Dobbs & Ferdon. After the death of Ferdon, the firm became Dobbs & Doty, then Dobbs & Nielsen, and eventually Dobbs, Berger, Molinari, Vannelli, Nadel & Links. Dobbs specialized in business law.

=== Business ===
Throughout his five decades practicing law, Dobbs was also an entrepreneur and businessman.

In 1947, Dobbs and Mel Weiss co-founded Mel's Drive-In –– the first drive-in restaurant in San Francisco –– at 140 South Van Ness Avenue. After their initial success, Dobbs and Weiss built Mel's into a successful chain with locations across Northern California. Mel's became an icon of mid-century American culture when it was memorialized in George Lucas's 1973 film American Graffiti, which highlighted the cruising and rock and roll cultures of the early 1960s.

Dobbs also owned several bowling alleys throughout the Bay Area and a chain of movie theaters in Hong Kong, and he was the founder of two additional restaurant chains called "King's" and "The Red Roof."

=== Politics ===
Dobbs served for 12 years on the San Francisco Board of Supervisors, first winning election in 1951 at age 32. He was re-elected to two additional four-year terms in 1955 and 1959, serving as President of the Board during his third term.

A close political ally of Mayor George Christopher, Dobbs served as Acting Mayor on several occasions during Christopher's absences from the city.

Dobbs ran for mayor himself three times, in 1963, 1967, and 1971. Each time, he placed second in a three-way contest:

- In 1963, Dobbs won 92,627 votes (38.47%) against Congressman Jack Shelley's 120,560 (50.07%) and Public Defender Edward Mancuso's 27,581 (11.46%). Shelley was elected mayor.
- In 1967, Dobbs won 90,482 votes (37.37%) against Joe Alioto's 106,814 (44.11%) and Jack Morrison's 40,206 (16.61%). Alioto was elected mayor.
- In 1971, Dobbs won 68,637 votes (27.66%) against Mayor Alioto's 95,744 (38.59%) and Dianne Feinstein's 53,911 (21.73%). Alioto was re-elected to a second term.

In an editorial endorsing Dobbs in 1963, the San Francisco Chronicle said he "knows how to use the gifts of persistence and quiet persuasion (and) has the vigor of mind and body San Francisco needs in the years ahead."

=== Community leadership ===
At various times throughout his long career, Dobbs served as president of the Concordia-Argonaut Club, Hastings College of the Law, the Jewish Home for the Aged, the Junior Chamber of Commerce, the Lake Merced Golf & Country Club, Lighthouse for the Blind, the Nob Hill Association, the S.F. Zoological Society, Saints and Sinners, Sinai Memorial Chapel, and the YMCA. He also served on the boards of the Florence Crittendon Home for Unwed Mothers, the Jewish Community Federation, Mount Zion Hospital, the Northern California Jewish Bulletin, the San Francisco Boy's Club, and St. Elizabeth's Infant Shelter.

He was particularly devoted to Hastings, serving on its board of directors for more than 20 years and as its president for a half dozen. His leadership helped to preserve Hastings' autonomy when it was threatened. Dobbs was named the Hastings College of the Law Alumnus of the Year in 1983, and the atrium in the college's main building is named in his honor.

== Personal life ==
Dobbs married Annette Dobbs (née Lehrer) in 1941. Annette was an important civic leader in her own right, serving on the boards of numerous San Francisco organizations, including as president of San Francisco's Jewish Community Federation. They remained married for 54 years, until Harold's death.

Harold and Annette had five children together: Stephen, Marilyn, Gregory, Rusty, and Cathy.

Dobbs was diagnosed with leukemia in 1985 and died in 1994, at the age of 75.
