= Dianne Feinstein =

American politician (1933–2023)

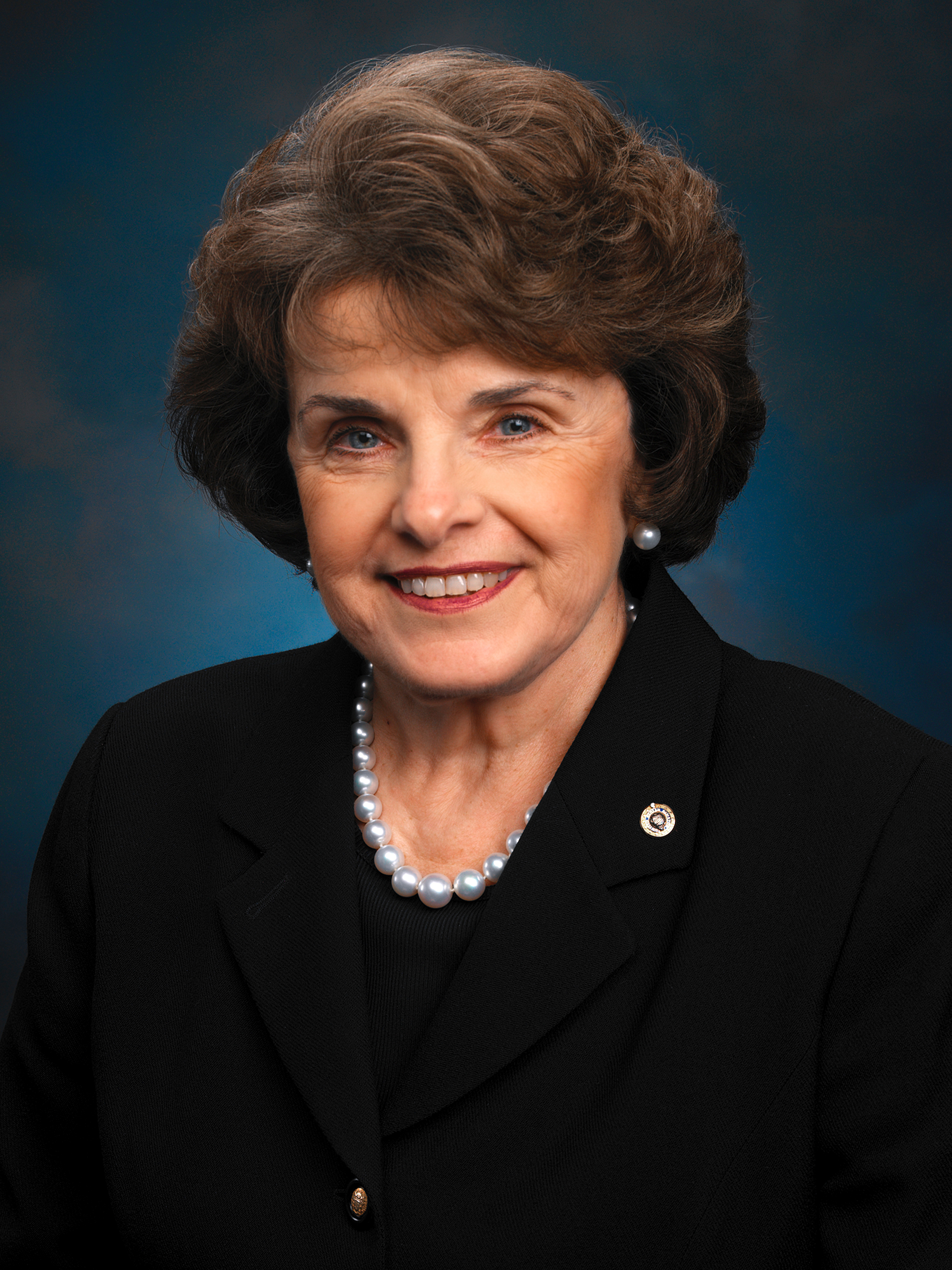
- Official portrait, 2004

United States Senator from California
- In office November 4, 1992 – September 29, 2023
- Preceded by: John Seymour
- Succeeded by: Laphonza Butler
Committees
Chair of the Senate Intelligence Committee
In office January 3, 2009 – January 3, 2015
Preceded by	Jay Rockefeller
Succeeded by	Richard Burr
Chair of the Senate Narcotics Caucus
In office January 3, 2009 – January 3, 2015
Preceded by	Joe Biden
Succeeded by	Chuck Grassley
Chair of the Senate Rules Committee
In office January 3, 2007 – January 3, 2009
Preceded by	Trent Lott
Succeeded by	Chuck Schumer

38th Mayor of San Francisco
- In office November 27, 1978 – January 8, 1988 (Note: Acting: November 27, 1978 – December 4, 1978)
- Preceded by: George Moscone
- Succeeded by: Art Agnos

President of the San Francisco Board of Supervisors
- In office January 9, 1978 – December 4, 1978
- Preceded by: Quentin L. Kopp
- Succeeded by: John Molinari
- In office January 8, 1974 – January 8, 1975
- Preceded by: Ron Pelosi
- Succeeded by: Quentin L. Kopp
- In office January 8, 1970 – January 8, 1971
- Preceded by: John A. Ertola
- Succeeded by: Ron Pelosi

Member of the San Francisco Board of Supervisors
- In office January 8, 1970 – December 4, 1978
- Preceded by: William Blake
- Succeeded by: Louise Renne
- Constituency: At-large district (1970–1978); 2nd district (1978)

Personal details
- Born: Dianne Emiel Goldman; June 22, 1933 San Francisco, California, U.S.
- Died: September 29, 2023 (aged 90) Washington, D.C., U.S.
- Resting place: Hills of Eternity Memorial Park, Colma, California
- Party: Democratic
- Spouses: Jack Berman (m. 1956; div. 1959); Bertram Feinstein (m. 1962; died 1978); Richard C. Blum (m. 1980; died 2022)
- Children: Katherine
- Parent: Leon Goldman (father)
- Education: Stanford University (BA)
- Feinstein's voice Feinstein gives opening remarks during a joint HPSCI–SSCI hearing on intelligence reform since the September 11 attacks Recorded September 13, 2011

Dianne Emiel Feinstein (Note: Pronounced /ˈfaɪnstaɪn/) (née Goldman; June 22, 1933 – September 29, 2023) was an American politician who served as a United States senator from California from 1992 until her death in 2023. A member of the Democratic Party, she previously served as the 38th mayor of San Francisco from 1978 to 1988.

A San Francisco native, Feinstein graduated from Stanford University in 1955. She was elected to the San Francisco Board of Supervisors in 1969 and immediately became the board's first female president upon her appointment in 1970. In 1978, during a third stint as the board's president, the assassinations of Mayor George Moscone and City Supervisor Harvey Milk drew national attention. Feinstein succeeded Moscone as mayor and became the first woman to serve in that position. During her tenure, she led the renovation of the city's cable car system and oversaw the 1984 Democratic National Convention. Despite a recall attempt in 1983, Feinstein was a popular mayor and was named the most effective mayor in the country by City & State in 1987.

After losing a race for governor in 1990, Feinstein was elected to the U.S. Senate in a 1992 special election. In November 1992, she became California's first female U.S. senator; shortly afterward, she became the state's senior senator when Alan Cranston retired in January 1993. Feinstein was reelected five times. In the 2012 election, she received 7.86 million votes, which was, until 2024, the most popular votes received by any U.S. Senate candidate in history.

As a senator, Feinstein authored the 1994 Federal Assault Weapons Ban, was the first woman to chair the Senate Rules Committee and the Senate Intelligence Committee, and was the first woman to preside over a U.S. presidential inauguration. She chaired the Senate Intelligence Committee from 2009 to 2015 and was the ranking member of the Senate Judiciary Committee from 2017 to 2021.

Feinstein's last years in office were marred by poor health and concerns about her mental acuity. In February 2023, Feinstein announced she would not seek reelection in 2024. Seven months later, she died in office at the age of 90. By the time of her death, Feinstein was the oldest sitting U.S. senator and member of Congress (now held by Chuck Grassley) as well as the oldest serving female U.S. senator (now held by Jeanne Shaheen) and the oldest Democratic U.S. senator (now held by Dick Durbin). She was also the longest-serving U.S. senator from California and the longest-tenured female senator in history.

== Early life and education ==
Feinstein was born Dianne Emiel Goldman on June 22, 1933, in San Francisco to Leon Goldman, a prominent surgeon, and his wife, Betty (née Rosenburg), a former model. Her paternal grandparents were Jewish immigrants from Poland. Her maternal grandparents, the Rosenburgs, were from Saint Petersburg, Russia. Although they were of German-Jewish ancestry, they practiced the Russian Orthodox (Christian) faith, as was required of Jews in Saint Petersburg. Christianity was passed down to Feinstein's mother, who insisted on her transfer from a Jewish day school to a prestigious local Catholic school, but Feinstein listed her religion as Judaism.

She graduated from Convent of the Sacred Heart High School in 1951 and from Stanford University in 1955 with a Bachelor of Arts in history. Feinstein's mother was abusive, prone to alcohol-fueled outbursts and, according to Feinstein's sister Yvonne Banks, emotionally unpredictable. Later, Feinstein's mother received a brain scan that found that the part of her brain responsible for judgment had atrophied, "possibly because of complications from a severe illness as a child".

Feinstein reportedly identified as half-Russian.

== Early political career ==
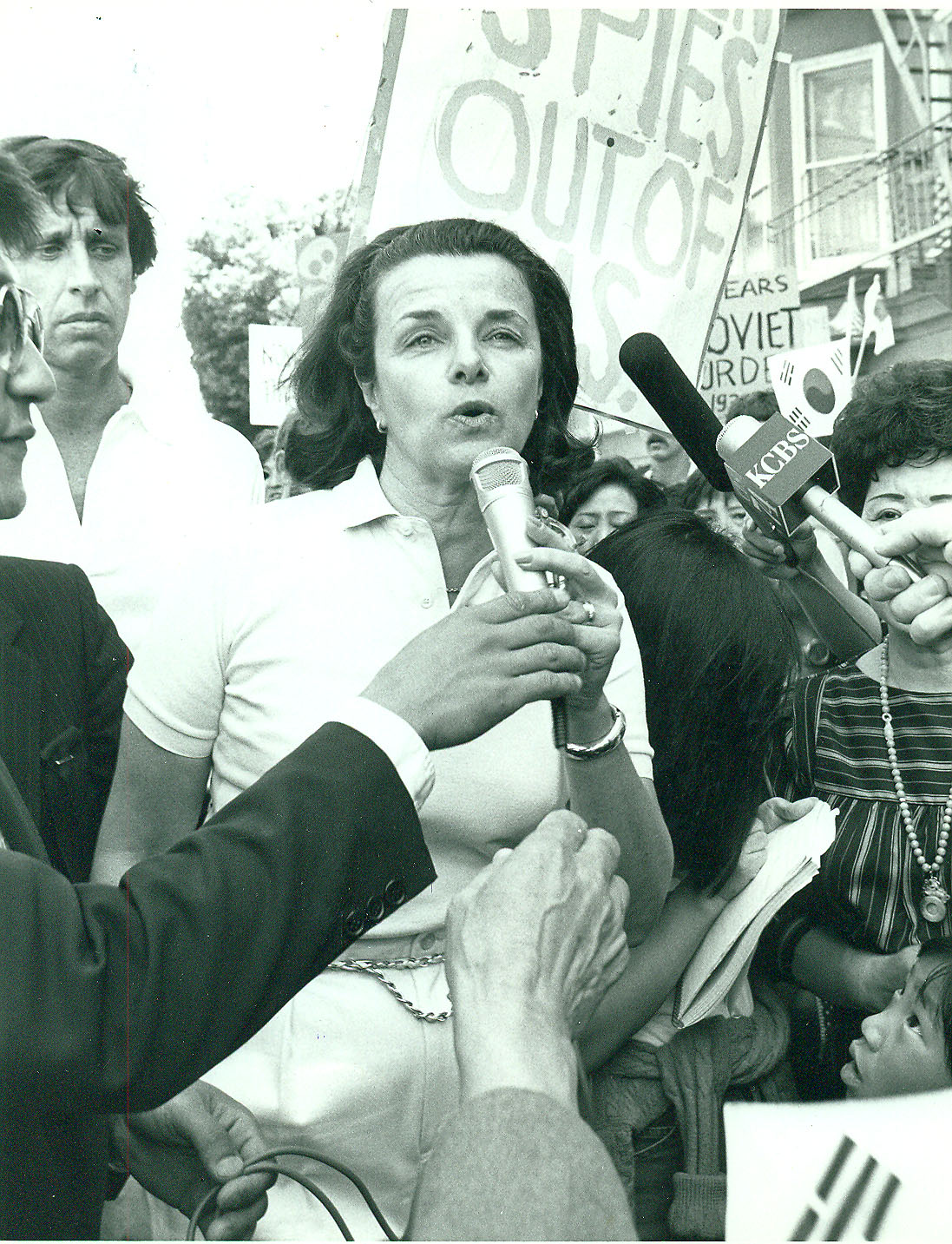
Feinstein in the late 1970s. (Future husband Richard C. Blum is standing behind her.)

From 1955 to 1956, Feinstein was a fellow at the Coro Foundation in San Francisco, an organization that provides young people with political experience. Governor Pat Brown appointed her to the California Women's Parole Board in 1960. She served on the board until 1966.

=== San Francisco Board of Supervisors and assassination attempt ===
Feinstein was elected to the San Francisco Board of Supervisors in 1969. She remained on the board for nine years, serving as its first female president from 1970 to 1971, with additional tenures from 1974 to 1975 and January to December 1978.

During her tenure on the Board of Supervisors, she unsuccessfully ran for mayor of San Francisco twice, in 1971 against Mayor Joseph Alioto, and in 1975, when she lost the contest for a runoff slot (against George Moscone) to Supervisor John Barbagelata.

Because of her position, Feinstein became a target of the New World Liberation Front, an anti-capitalist terrorist group that carried out bombings in California in the 1970s. In 1976, the NWLF placed a bomb on the windowsill of her home that failed to explode. The group later shot out the windows of a beach house she owned.

=== Mayor of San Francisco ===
After San Francisco Mayor George Moscone and Supervisor Harvey Milk were assassinated by former Supervisor Dan White on November 27, 1978, Feinstein became acting mayor, as she was president of the Board of Supervisors. Supervisors John Molinari, Ella Hill Hutch, Ron Pelosi, Robert Gonzales, and Gordon Lau endorsed her for an appointment as mayor by the Board of Supervisors. Gonzales initially ran to be appointed by the Board of Supervisors as mayor, but dropped out. The Board of Supervisors voted six to two to appoint Feinstein as mayor. She was inaugurated by Chief Justice Rose Bird of the Supreme Court of California on December 4, 1978, becoming San Francisco's first female mayor. Molinari was selected to replace Feinstein as president of the Board of Supervisors by a vote of eight to two.

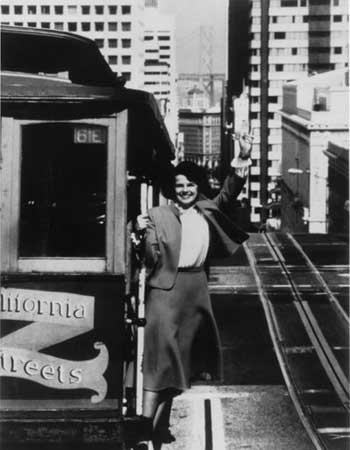
Feinstein riding a cable car in San Francisco during her tenure as mayor, c.1978–1988

One of Feinstein's first challenges as mayor was the state of the San Francisco cable car system, which was shut down for emergency repairs in 1979; an engineering study concluded that it needed comprehensive rebuilding at a cost of $60 million. Feinstein helped win federal funding for the bulk of the work. The system closed for rebuilding in 1982 and was completed in time for the 1984 Democratic National Convention. Feinstein also oversaw policies to increase the number of San Francisco's high-rise buildings.

Feinstein was seen as a relatively moderate Democrat in one of the country's most liberal cities. As a supervisor, she was considered part of the centrist bloc that included White and generally opposed Moscone. As mayor, Feinstein angered the city's large gay community in 1982 by vetoing legislation which would have extended city-employee benefits to domestic partners. In the 1980 presidential election, while a majority of Bay Area Democrats continued to support Senator Ted Kennedy's primary challenge to President Jimmy Carter even after it was clear Kennedy could not win, Feinstein strongly supported the Carter–Mondale ticket. She was given a high-profile speaking role on the opening night of the August Democratic National Convention, urging delegates to reject the Kennedy delegates' proposal to "open" the convention, thereby allowing delegates to ignore their states' popular vote, a proposal that was soundly defeated.

In the run-up to the 1984 Democratic National Convention, there was considerable media and public speculation that Mondale might pick Feinstein as his running mate. He chose Geraldine Ferraro instead. In 1982, Feinstein proposed banning handguns in San Francisco, and became subject to a recall attempt organized by the White Panther Party. She won the recall election and finished her second term as mayor on January 8, 1988.

Feinstein revealed sensitive details about the hunt for serial killer Richard Ramirez at a 1985 press conference, antagonizing detectives by publicizing details of his crimes known only to law enforcement, and thus jeopardizing their investigation.

City & State magazine named Feinstein the nation's "Most Effective Mayor" in 1987. She was a member of the Trilateral Commission in 1988.

=== Gubernatorial election ===
Feinstein made an unsuccessful bid for governor of California in 1990. She won the Democratic nomination, but lost the general election to U.S. Senator Pete Wilson, who resigned from the Senate to assume the governorship. In 1992, Feinstein was fined $190,000 for failure to properly report campaign contributions and expenditures in that campaign.

== U.S. Senate ==
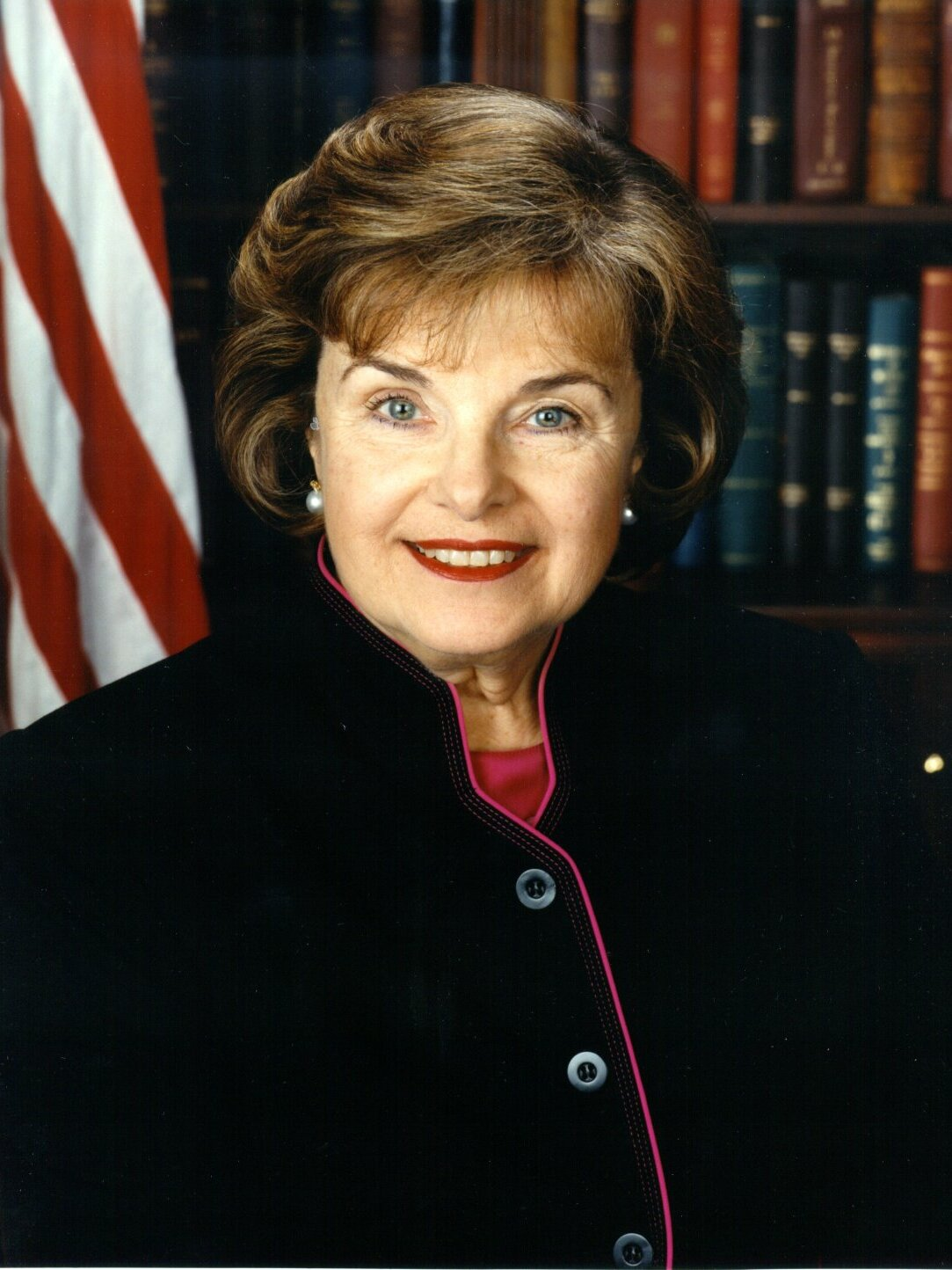
Official portrait, 2000s

=== Elections ===
In 1991, Wilson resigned from the Senate to take office as governor of California. Feinstein ran for U.S. Senate in a 1992 special election to complete Wilson's term. In the Democratic primary, she defeated Joseph Alioto and California State Controller Gray Davis. In November, she faced Republican John Seymour, whom Wilson had appointed to the Senate the previous year. Feinstein won the November 3 special election, 54.3%–38%.

Like Feinstein, Barbara Boxer was first elected to the Senate on November 3, 1992. Because Feinstein was elected to complete an unexpired term, she was sworn in as a senator in November 1992, while Boxer did not take office until January 1993. Therefore, when Boxer was sworn in, Feinstein became California's senior senator. She also became the first female Jewish U.S. senator. Feinstein and Boxer were the first female pair of U.S. senators to represent any state at the same time.

Feinstein was reelected in 1994, 2000, 2006, 2012, and 2018.

In October 2017, Feinstein declared her intention to run for reelection in 2018. She lost the endorsement of the California Democratic Party's executive board, which opted to support State Senator Kevin de León. Nevertheless, Feinstein finished first in the state's "jungle primary" and was reelected in the November 6 general election, defeating de Leon, 54.2–45.8%.

=== Tenure ===
Feinstein has been described as "a titan of US political history who notched countless legislative achievements" in her Senate career. She was known for her work on gun control issues. In 1994, she spearheaded the passage of a federal assault weapons ban. In the 2000s and 2010s, she investigated "the Central Intelligence Agency's program of detention and interrogation after the Sept. 11 attacks".

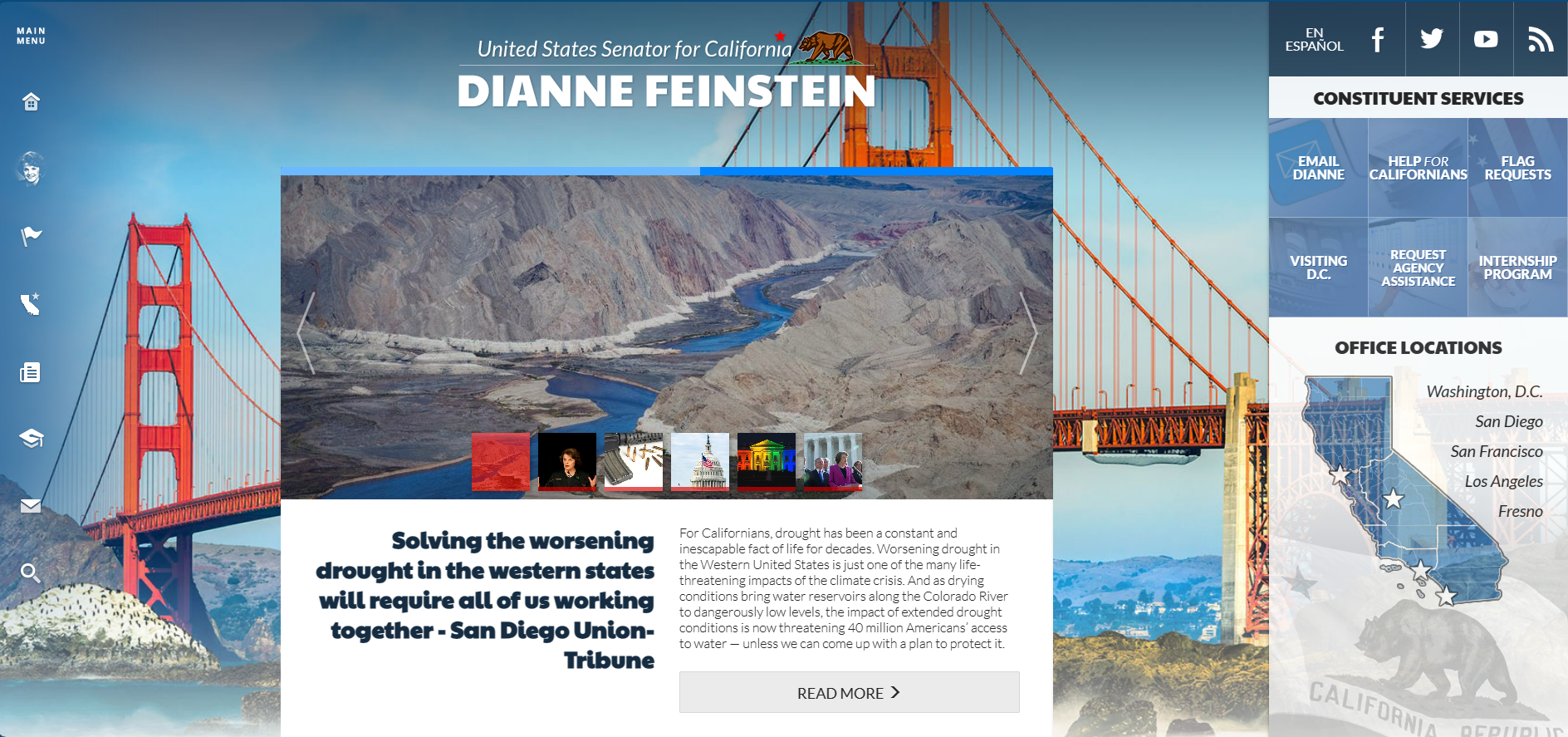
The main page of Sen. Feinstein's website, September 29, 2023

In 2009, Feinstein chaired the first inaugural ceremony of President Barack Obama. She was the first woman to chair the Senate Rules Committee (2007–2009) and the first to chair the Select Committee on Intelligence (2009–2015). Feinstein became the top Democrat on the Senate Judiciary Committee in 2017, and was the first woman to hold that position. On March 28, 2021, she became the longest-serving U.S. senator from California ever, surpassing Hiram Johnson. On November 5, 2022, Feinstein became the longest-serving female senator in U.S. history.

In the fall of 2020, media reports indicated that Feinstein was experiencing cognitive decline and short-term memory loss. She responded that there was no cause for concern and that she had no plans to leave the Senate. After her performance at Amy Coney Barrett's October 2020 Supreme Court nomination hearings was criticized, Feinstein did not seek to chair the Senate Judiciary Committee or serve as its ranking member in 2021. Articles in The New Yorker and The New York Times cited unnamed Democratic senators and aides expressing concern over her age and ability to lead the committee. In mid-2022, NPR and other outlets ran stories questioning Feinstein's cognition. On October 22, 2022, Feinstein said that due to family matters, she was not interested in serving as president pro tempore in 2023; the position is traditionally held by the senior member of the Senate's majority party.

In February 2023, Feinstein said she would not seek reelection in 2024 and that she intended to retire upon the completion of her term.

Feinstein's two-month hospitalization for shingles in early 2023 effectively stalled many of the Biden administration's judicial and executive nominees. Feinstein served on the Judiciary Committee, which was evenly split between Democrats and Republicans without her. Representatives Ro Khanna, Dean Phillips, and Alexandria Ocasio-Cortez, along with a group of California progressive organizations and the New York Times editorial board, publicly urged Feinstein to resign. She resisted calls to resign. However, she requested temporary removal from the Judiciary Committee; Senate Republicans declined this request.

Feinstein returned to the Senate on May 10, 2023, amid continuing concern about her capacity to serve.

=== Committee assignments ===
Feinstein was the first woman to chair the Senate Rules Committee (2007–2009) and the first to chair the Select Committee on Intelligence (2009–2015). She became the top Democrat on the Senate Judiciary Committee in 2017, and was the first woman to hold that position. Her committee assignments for the 118th Congress were as follows:

- Committee on Appropriations
  - Subcommittee on Agriculture, Rural Development, Food and Drug Administration, and Related Agencies
  - Subcommittee on Commerce, Justice, Science, and Related Agencies
  - Subcommittee on Defense
  - Subcommittee on Energy and Water Development (Chair) (Note: Former Ranking Member, 116th Congress)
  - Subcommittee on Interior, Environment, and Related Agencies
  - Subcommittee on Transportation, Housing and Urban Development, and Related Agencies
- Committee on the Judiciary (Note: Former Ranking Member, 115th and 116th Congresses)
  - Subcommittee on the Constitution (Chair)
  - Subcommittee on Criminal Justice and Counterterrorism
  - Subcommittee on Federal Courts, Oversight, Agency Action and Federal Rights
  - Subcommittee on Human Rights and the Law (Note: Former Chair, 117th Congress)
- Committee on Rules and Administration (Note: Former Chair, 110th Congress)
- Select Committee on Intelligence (Note: Former Chair, 111th, 112th, 113th Congresses)

She previously sat on the Foreign Relations Committee (104th Congress) and Energy and Natural Resources Committee (107th–109th Congress)

=== Caucus memberships ===
- Afterschool Caucuses
- Congressional NextGen 9-1-1 Caucus
- Senate New Democrat Coalition (defunct)

== Political positions ==
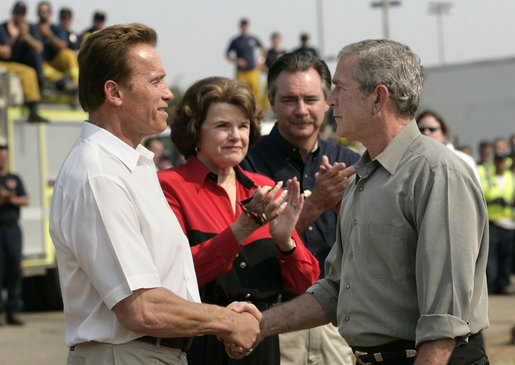
Feinstein with President George W. Bush and California Governor Arnold Schwarzenegger, October 25, 2007

In 2018, the Los Angeles Times wrote that Feinstein had emphasized her centrism when she first ran for statewide offices in the 1990s (when California was more conservative than it became during Feinstein's later career). Over time, she moved leftward as California became one of the most Democratic states in the nation. In 2013, The New York Times called her a "liberal lioness". Feinstein was known for her advocacy of gun control, abortion access, environmental protection, and a strong national defense.

=== Abortion ===
Feinstein supported abortion rights during her Senate career. In 2003, she voted against the Partial-Birth Abortion Ban Act, a proposal to ban intact dilation and extraction, although the proposal eventually became law. After the Supreme Court overturned Roe v. Wade in 2022, Feinstein called for congressional action to protect abortion rights and stated her support for lifting the Senate filibuster rule to allow such legislation to pass with a simple majority.

=== Animal welfare ===
In 2008, Feinstein was the first major statewide elected official in California to endorse Proposition 2, which prohibited the intensive confinement of certain farm animals. In 2022, she led a letter to the Solicitor General of the United States, Elizabeth Prelogar, which asked Prelogar to defend California's Proposition 12, extending Proposition 2's protections to all animals raised for pork, veal, and egg products sold in California, before the Supreme Court. After the Supreme Court dismissed a challenge to Proposition 12 in 2023, Feinstein led a letter opposing the inclusion of language in the 2023 farm bill that would have overturned Proposition 12 and other state farm animal welfare laws.

Following Feinstein's death in 2023, American animal welfare activist and president of Animal Wellness Action Wayne Pacelle stated that Feinstein "was a giant on the national stage on animal welfare public policy."

=== Capital punishment ===
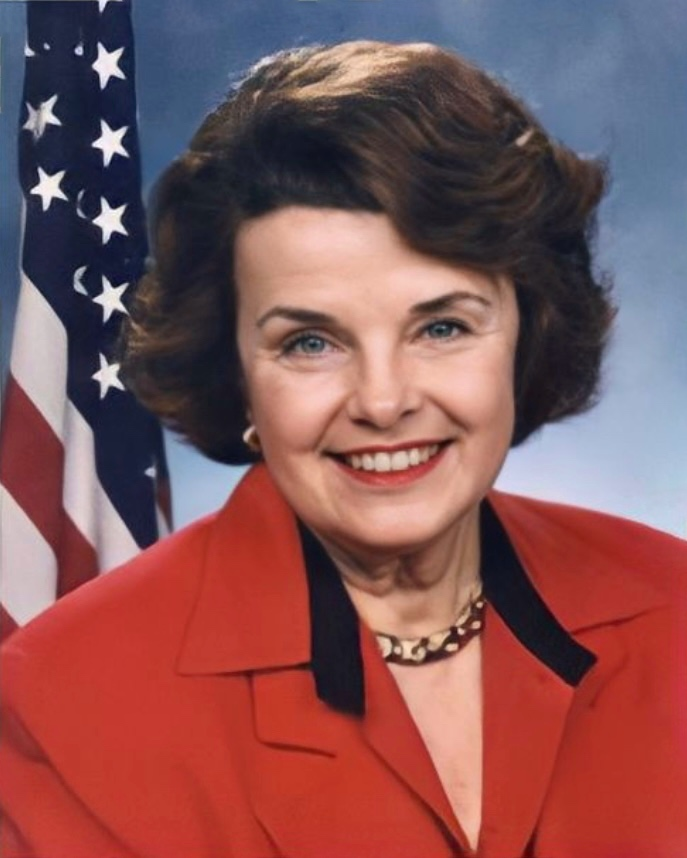
Feinstein during the 108th Congress

When Feinstein first ran for statewide office in 1990, she supported capital punishment. In 2004, she called for the death penalty in the case of San Francisco police officer Isaac Espinoza, who was killed while on duty. By 2018, she opposed capital punishment.

=== Energy and environment ===
==== Climate change mitigation ====
In 2007, Feinstein led a bipartisan effort as part of the wider Energy Independence and Security Act to significantly reduce automotive greenhouse gas emissions, which accounted for 26 percent of total U.S. emissions at the time. Her legislation, the Ten-in-Ten Fuel Economy Act, raised corporate average fuel economy standards for America's fleet of vehicles by at least 10 miles per gallon between 2010 and 2020 - the largest increase in fuel efficiency in almost three decades. Thereafter, said CAFE standards became subject to periodic adjustments by the National Highway Traffic Safety Administration under the Administrative Procedure Act. (Note: Refer to subtitle A of EISA.) As a result of Feinstein's legislation, average fleet fuel economy for new automobiles will climb to approximately 60 miles per gallon by 2032, cutting greenhouse gas emissions from passenger and commercial vehicles in half without impeding automotive performance or degrading traffic safety.

During the 110th Congress, Feinstein authored an amendment to the Consolidated Appropriations Act, 2008, mandating all major sources of greenhouse gasses to annually report their emissions to the Environmental Protection Agency. (Note: Refer to Title II of the bill summary for the Consolidated Appropriations Act, 2008.) These emissions disclosures in turn inform EPA's nationwide, multi-sector inventory of greenhouse gas emissions and sinks, which is submitted to the United Nations in accordance with the Framework Convention on Climate Change.

Feinstein co-sponsored (with Oklahoma Republican Tom Coburn) an amendment through the Senate to the Economic Development Revitalization Act of 2011 that eliminated the Volumetric Ethanol Excise Tax Credit. The Senate passed the amendment on June 16, 2011. Introduced in 2004, the subsidy provided a 45-cent-per-gallon credit on pure ethanol, and a 54-cent-per-gallon tariff on imported ethanol. These subsidies had resulted in an annual expenditure of $6 billion.

In February 2019, when youth associated with the Sunrise Movement confronted Feinstein about why she did not support the Green New Deal, she told them, "there's no way to pay for it", and that it could not pass a Republican-controlled Senate. In a tweet after the confrontation, she said that she remained committed "to enact real, meaningful climate change legislation". Conversely, the Sunrise Movement tweeted that Feinstein had reacted with "smugness and disrespect", and that "her reaction is why young people desperately want new leadership in Congress."

Later in the 116th and 117th Congresses, Feinstein authored the Addressing Climate Financial Risk Act, to prepare U.S. financial institutions for risks posed by climate change. While Feinstein's bill ultimately died in the Senate, President Biden issued an executive order containing several of its provisions, including directing the Treasury Department to study climate-related financial risks. In addition, Feinstein co-sponsored with Senator Coons the Climate Action Rebate Act of 2019 - legislation that would create a nationwide carbon fee and dividend program to decarbonize the American economy and transition it to net-zero. As with the Addressing Climate Financial Risk Act, the Climate Action Rebate Act also failed to make it out of committee. However, a separate battery storage tax credit bill co-sponsored by Feinstein was ultimately incorporated into the Inflation Reduction Act, legislation she also supported.

==== Lake Tahoe ====
Feinstein, who spent her childhood visiting the lake, regarded Lake Tahoe as "a national treasure" and "the Jewel of the High Sierra". She founded the Lake Tahoe Summit in 1997 and successfully authored the landmark Lake Tahoe Restoration Act of 2000. This act of Congress formally created the Lake Tahoe Basin Management Unit within the National Forest System and authorized $900 million in federal spending over ten years for invasive species control, stormwater management, environmental protection, and fire risk mitigation projects throughout the Lake Tahoe watershed. Later in 2016, Feinstein co-sponsored with senators Barbara Boxer, Harry Reid, and Dean Heller a bipartisan seven-year extension of the Lake Tahoe Restoration Act, authorizing another $415 million to combat invasive species, improve water quality and forest health, restore habitat for fish and wildlife, and reduce the threat of catastrophic wildfires. She co-sponsored a second bipartisan, bicameral reauthorization of the Lake Tahoe Restoration Act's activities with senators Catherine Cortez Masto, Jacky Rosen, and Alex Padilla on March 1, 2023 – six months before her death.

==== Public lands ====
Feinstein co-sponsored legislation in 2006 with Barbara Boxer that permanently protected approximately 300,000 acres of wilderness in Northern California, namely the King Range, Yolla-Bolly Middle Eel, and Trinity Alps wilderness areas, along with 21 miles of the Black Butte River in Mendocino County. The King Range Wilderness, part of the King Range National Conservation Area, has the longest stretch of undeveloped coastline anywhere in the lower 48 states; its Lost Coast is often considered the "crown jewel" in the National Landscape Conservation System. The Yolla-Bolly Middle Eel Wilderness, which surrounds the Middle Fork Eel River, hosts roughly half of California's summer-run steelhead population. The river is the largest remaining wild run of these fish in the lower 48 states. The Trinity Alps Wilderness encompasses rugged mountains, alpine meadows, myriad pristine lakes and streams, 550 miles of maintained hiking trails, and California's third-largest swath of previously unprotected old-growth, predominantly Douglas-fir forest.

Feinstein also helped secure $250 million in federal matching grants to purchase the 7,500-acre Headwaters Forest, at the time the world's last tract of privately owned, intact, old-growth redwood forest. Her 1999 legislation guaranteed the continued conservation of the 12 ancient redwood groves contained within the Headwaters Forest by bringing them under federal management. Several threatened species call the Headwaters Forest home, including coho salmon, the northern spotted owl, and the marbled murrelet. The resulting Headwaters Forest Reserve is managed by the Bureau of Land Management in partnership with the California Department of Fish and Wildlife as part of the National Landscape Conservation System.

Perhaps Feinstein's greatest contribution to public lands conservation came through her advocacy for California's Mojave and Sonoran deserts. She authored landmark legislation in 1994 that established Death Valley National Park, Joshua Tree National Park, and Mojave National Preserve, and designated another 7.6 million acres of California desert as federal wilderness. This California Desert Protection Act was followed in 2000 by Feinstein's Santa Rosa and San Jacinto Mountains National Monument Act, designating 272,000 acres in the Santa Rosa and San Jacinto mountain ranges as a national monument. Later in 2016, Feinstein persuaded President Obama to create Mojave Trails, Sand to Snow, and Castle Mountains national monuments under the Antiquities Act. She also authored the California Desert Protection and Recreation Act as part of the bipartisan omnibus public lands package passed in 2019, furthering landscape conservation and outdoor recreation opportunities in the California desert. The combined acreage of the 1994, 2000, and 2019 acts of Congress, in concert with the presidentially authorized national monument designations, protect the largest tract of public lands anywhere in the lower 48 states and the second-largest desert preserve on the planet.

=== Foreign policy ===
==== China ====
Feinstein supported a conciliatory approach between China and Taiwan and fostered increased dialogue between high-level Chinese representatives and U.S. senators during her first term as senator. When asked about her relation with Beijing, Feinstein said, "I sometimes say that in my last life maybe I was Chinese."

Feinstein criticized Beijing's missile tests near Taiwan and called for dismantlement of missiles pointed at the island. She promoted stronger business ties between China and Taiwan over confrontation, and suggested that the U.S. patiently "use two-way trade across Taiwan Strait as a platform for more political dialogue and closer ties".

She believed that deeper cross-strait economic integration "will one day lead to political integration and will ultimately provide the solution" to the Taiwan issue.

In July 2018, Politico found that several years previously, a Chinese staff member who worked for 20 years as Feinstein's personal driver, gofer and liaison to the Asian-American community had reported on local politics to a member of China's Ministry of State Security. According to the reports, the staffer did not realize he was being recruited by Chinese state intelligence, thinking that it was just a friend; after an interview, the FBI "concluded the driver hadn’t revealed anything of substance", and he was forced to retire by Feinstein. No criminal charges were filed against him.

==== Iran ====
Feinstein supported the Iran nuclear deal framework in July 2015, saying that it would usher in "unprecedented & intrusive inspections to verify cooperation" by Iran.

On June 7, 2017, Feinstein and Senator Bernie Sanders issued dual statements urging the Senate to forgo a vote for sanctions on Iran in response to the Tehran attacks that occurred earlier in the day.

==== Iraq ====
Feinstein voted for the Iraq War and later said she regretted it.

==== Israel ====
In September 2016—in advance of UN Security Council resolution 2334 condemning Israeli settlements in the occupied Palestinian territories—Feinstein signed an AIPAC-sponsored letter urging Obama to veto "one-sided" resolutions against Israel.

Feinstein opposed President Donald Trump's decision to recognize Jerusalem as Israel's capital, saying, "Recognizing Jerusalem as Israel's capital—or relocating our embassy to Jerusalem—will spark violence and embolden extremists on both sides of the debate."

==== North Korea ====
During a July 2017 appearance on Face the Nation after North Korea conducted a second test of an intercontinental ballistic missile, Feinstein said the country had proven itself a danger to the U.S. She also expressed her disappointment with China's lack of response.

Responding to reports that North Korea had achieved successful miniaturization of nuclear warheads, Feinstein issued an August 8, 2017, statement insisting that isolation of North Korea had proven ineffective and that Trump's rhetoric was not helping resolve potential conflict. She also called for the U.S. to "quickly engage North Korea in a high-level dialogue without any preconditions".

In September 2017, after Trump's first speech to the United Nations General Assembly, in which he threatened North Korea, Feinstein released a statement disagreeing with his remarks: "Trump's bombastic threat to destroy North Korea and his refusal to present any positive pathways forward on the many global challenges we face are severe disappointments."

=== Gun control ===
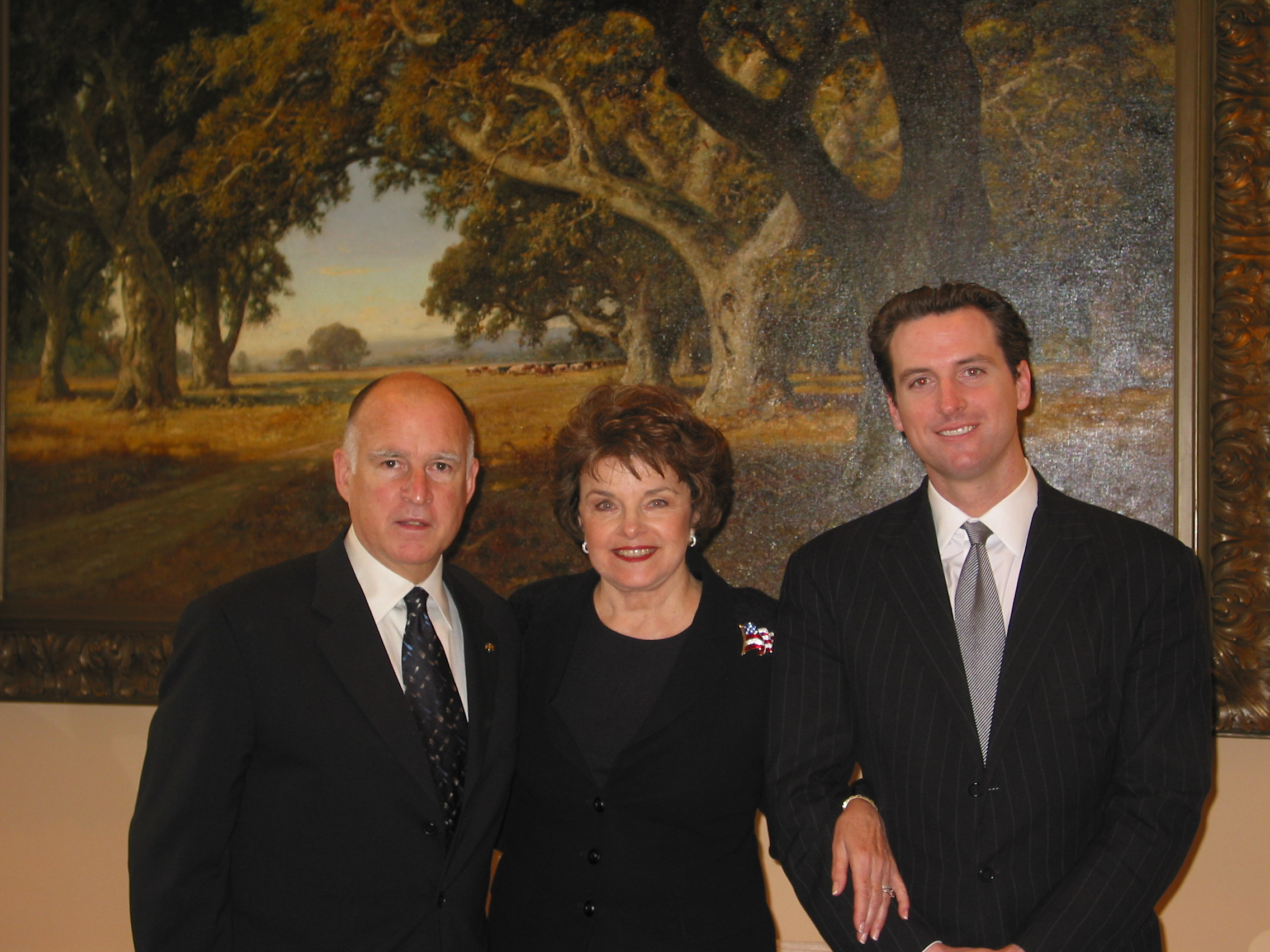
Oakland Mayor Jerry Brown (left) with U.S. Senator Dianne Feinstein (middle) and San Francisco Mayor Gavin Newsom (right) in 2007

Feinstein introduced the Federal Assault Weapons Ban, which became law in 1994 and expired in 2004. In January 2013, about a month after the Sandy Hook Elementary School shooting, she and Representative Carolyn McCarthy proposed a bill that would "ban the sale, transfer, manufacturing or importation of 150 specific firearms including semiautomatic rifles or pistols that can be used with a detachable or fixed ammunition magazines that hold more than 10 rounds and have specific military-style features, including pistol grips, grenade launchers or rocket launchers". The bill would have exempted 900 models of guns used for sport and hunting. Feinstein said of the bill, "The common thread in each of these shootings is the gunman used a semi-automatic assault weapon or large-capacity ammunition magazines. Military assault weapons only have one purpose, and in my opinion, it's for the military." The bill failed on a Senate vote of 60 to 40.

=== Health care ===
Feinstein supported the Affordable Care Act, repeatedly voting to defeat initiatives aimed against it. She voted to regulate tobacco as a drug; expand the Children's Health Insurance Program; override the president's veto of adding 2 to 4 million children to SCHIP eligibility; increase Medicaid rebate for producing generic drugs; negotiate bulk purchases for Medicare prescription drugs; allow re-importation of prescription drugs from Canada; allow patients to sue HMOs and collect punitive damages; cover prescription drugs under Medicare, and means-test Medicare. She voted against the Paul Ryan Budget's Medicare choice, tax and spending cuts; and allowing tribal Indians to opt out of federal healthcare. Feinstein also favored the creation of a public option to achieve universal healthcare, co-sponsoring a bill with that aim. Feinstein's congressional voting record was rated as 88% by the American Public Health Association (APHA), the figure ostensibly reflecting the percentage of time the representative voted the organization's preferred position.

At an April 2017 town hall meeting in San Francisco, Feinstein was booed when she stated that she did not support a proposal for single-payer health insurance. Feinstein said, "[i]f single-payer health care is going to mean the complete takeover by the government of all health care, I am not there." During a news conference at the University of California, San Diego in July 2017, she estimated that Democratic opposition would prove sufficient to defeat Republican attempts to repeal the ACA. Feinstein wrote in an August 2017 op-ed that Trump could secure health-care reform if he compromised with Democrats: "We now know that such a closed process on a major issue like health care doesn't work. The only path forward is a transparent process that allows every senator to bring their ideas to the table."

=== Immigration ===
In September 2017, after Attorney General Jeff Sessions rescinded the Deferred Action for Childhood Arrivals program, Feinstein admitted the legality of the program was questionable while citing this as a reason for why a law should be passed. In her opening remarks at a January 2018 Senate Judiciary Committee hearing, she said she was concerned the Trump administration's decision to terminate temporary protected status might be racially motivated, based on comments Trump made denigrating African countries, Haiti, and El Salvador.

=== LGBTQ+ rights ===
Feinstein was recognized as an ally or champion of LGBTQ+ Americans at the time of her passing, driven by her advocacy in the Senate for LGBTQ rights and her early political career as both a supervisor and mayor in her hometown of San Francisco, which has a large LGBTQ+ community. Feinstein famously described her firsthand experience of the hate-motivated assassinations of George Moscone and Harvey Milk as "...one of the hardest moments, if not the hardest moments, of my life." It informed not only her politics but her approach to LGBTQ rights for the rest of her life.

Whilst a supervisor, Feinstein authored the nation’s first local anti-gay discrimination ordinance, supported passage of the Consenting Adult Sex Act, publicly opposed Proposition 6, and cast the deciding vote for Harvey Milk’s landmark gay rights law. Her subsequent tenure as mayor was a mixed bag for LGBTQ+ inclusion. Feinstein vetoed an ordinance in 1982 that would have allowed unmarried couples to register their domestic partnerships and extended spousal benefits to the same-sex partners of city employees. Her opposition to the ordinance stemmed not from its legislative intent but from the manner and form in which it was written, arguing the language was full of "ambiguity, vagueness, and unclarity." Later in 1984, she ordered that the city’s bathhouses be closed as a means to combat the spread of HIV, even though public health officials and activists hadn’t reached agreement that such a move was necessary. Nevertheless, Feinstein won accolades for her response to the HIV epidemic in San Francisco, building out a public-private network of AIDS-related services now known as the San Francisco model that delivered evidence-based, compassionate care.

Early on as a U.S. senator, Feinstein opposed the Pentagon's Don't ask, don't tell policy, co-sponsoring a bill to repeal the policy in 1994 and every year thereafter until 2011, when her Don't Ask, Don't Tell Repeal Act of 2010 became law. Later in 1996, she was one of only 14 senators to vote against the Defense of Marriage Act (DOMA), which defined marriage as an opposite-sex union for purposes of federal law. In 2011, she introduced a bill to repeal DOMA. In 2022, she was the lead Senate sponsor of the Respect for Marriage Act, which repealed DOMA and required the federal government and all state governments to recognize same-sex and interracial marriages.

Feinstein's advocacy for LGBTQ+ Americans extended beyond marriage equality, military inclusion, and anti-discrimination. Feinstein co-sponsored the Matthew Shepard and James Byrd Jr. Hate Crimes Prevention Act, which was signed into law on October 28, 2009, as a legislative rider to the National Defense Authorization Act for Fiscal Year 2010. The Shepard-Byrd Act, named after Matthew Shepard, a gay college student murdered in Wyoming in 1998, and James Byrd Jr., an African American man murdered in Texas in 1998, expanded the definition of hate crimes to cover all acts of violence motivated by a victim’s actual or perceived sexual orientation or gender identity. During congressional hearings on the bill, Feinstein delivered a speech emphasizing that hate-motivated attacks against LGBTQ+ individuals are particularly heinous and deserved enhanced penalties.

=== Marijuana ===
Feinstein opposed a number of reforms to cannabis laws at the state and federal level. In 2016 she opposed Proposition 64, the Adult Use of Marijuana Act, to legalize recreational cannabis in California. In 1996 she opposed Proposition 215 to legalize the medical use of cannabis in California. In 2015 she was the only Democrat at a Senate hearing to vote against the Rohrabacher–Farr amendment, legislation that limits the enforcement of federal law in states that have legalized medical cannabis. Feinstein cited her belief that cannabis is a gateway drug in voting against the amendment.

In 2018, Feinstein softened her views on marijuana and cosponsored the STATES Act, legislation that would protect states from federal interference regarding both medical and recreational use. She also supported legislation in 2015 to allow medical cannabis to be recommended to veterans in states where its use is legal.

=== National security ===
==== Defense policy ====
While delivering the commencement address at Stanford Stadium on June 13, 1994, Feinstein said:

It is time for a rational plan for defense conversion instead of the random closing of bases and the piecemeal cancellation of defense contracts. Otherwise, we risk losing, for both state and nation, the greatest resources of scientific, technical and human capital ever gathered together in human history.

Feinstein was described during her lifetime as a "hawk" on matters of national security. She voted for the extension of the Patriot Act and the FISA provisions in 2012. Feinstein also voted for President Trump's $675-billion defense budget bill for FY 2019. Later in 2017, she criticized the banning of transgender enlistments in the military under the Trump administration.

==== Mass surveillance and citizens' privacy ====
Feinstein co-sponsored PIPA on May 12, 2011. She met with representatives of technology companies, including Google and Facebook, in January 2012. A Feinstein spokesperson said she "is doing all she can to ensure that the bill is balanced and protects the intellectual property concerns of the content community without unfairly burdening legitimate businesses such as Internet search engines".

Following her 2012 vote to extend the Patriot Act and the FISA provisions, and after the 2013 mass surveillance disclosures involving the National Security Agency (NSA), Feinstein promoted and supported measures to continue the information collection programs. Feinstein and Saxby Chambliss also defended the NSA's request to Verizon for all the metadata about phone calls made within the U.S. and from the U.S. to other countries. They said the information gathered by intelligence on the phone communications is used to connect phone lines to terrorists and that it did not contain the content of the phone calls or messages. Foreign Policy wrote that she had a "reputation as a staunch defender of NSA practices and [of] the White House's refusal to stand by collection activities targeting foreign leaders".

In October 2013, Feinstein criticized the NSA for monitoring telephone calls of foreign leaders friendly to the U.S. In November 2013, she promoted the FISA Improvements Act bill, which included a "backdoor search provision" that allows intelligence agencies to continue certain warrantless searches as long as they are logged and "available for review" to various agencies.

In June 2013, Feinstein called Edward Snowden a "traitor" after his leaks went public. In October 2013, she said she stood by that.

In 2014, Feinstein accused the CIA of snooping and removing files from congressional computers, saying that the "CIA's search may well have violated the separation of powers principles embodied in the United States Constitution". Several months later the CIA admitted to having hacked Senate Intelligence Committee computers. Feinstein's displeasure at having been spied on was contrasted with her support for government surveillance of US citizens, with public figures and privacy advocates such as Jon Stewart and Edward Snowden noting the apparent incongruity.

After the 2016 FBI–Apple encryption dispute, Feinstein and Richard Burr sponsored a bill that would likely have criminalized all forms of strong encryption in electronic communication between citizens. The bill would have required technology companies to design their encryption so that they can provide law enforcement with user data in an "intelligible format" when required to do so by court order.

In 2020, Feinstein co sponsored the EARN IT Act, which seeks to create a 19-member committee to decide a list of best practices websites must follow to be protected by section 230 of the Communications Decency Act. The EARN IT Act effectively outlaws end-to-end encryption, depriving the world of secure, private communications tools.

==== Torture ====
Feinstein served on the Senate's Select Committee on Intelligence, her time on the committee coinciding with the Senate Report on Pre-war Intelligence on Iraq and the debates on the torture/"enhanced interrogation" of terrorists and alleged terrorists. On the Senate floor on December 9, 2014, the day parts of the Senate Intelligence Committee report on CIA torture were released to the public, Feinstein called the government's detention and interrogation program a "stain on our values and on our history".

=== Presidential politics ===
During the 1980 presidential election, Feinstein served on President Jimmy Carter's steering committee in California and as a Carter delegate to the Democratic National Convention. She was selected to serve as one of the four chairs of the 1980 Democratic National Convention.

Feinstein endorsed former Vice President Walter Mondale during the 1984 presidential election. She and Democratic National Committee chairman Charles Manatt signed a contract in 1983, making San Francisco the host of the 1984 Democratic National Convention.

As a superdelegate in the 2008 Democratic presidential primaries, Feinstein said she would support Clinton for the nomination. But after Barack Obama became the presumptive nominee, she fully backed his candidacy. Days after Obama amassed enough delegates to win the nomination, Feinstein lent her Washington, D.C., home to Clinton and Obama for a private one-on-one meeting. She did not attend the 2008 Democratic National Convention in Denver because she had fallen and broken her ankle earlier in the month.

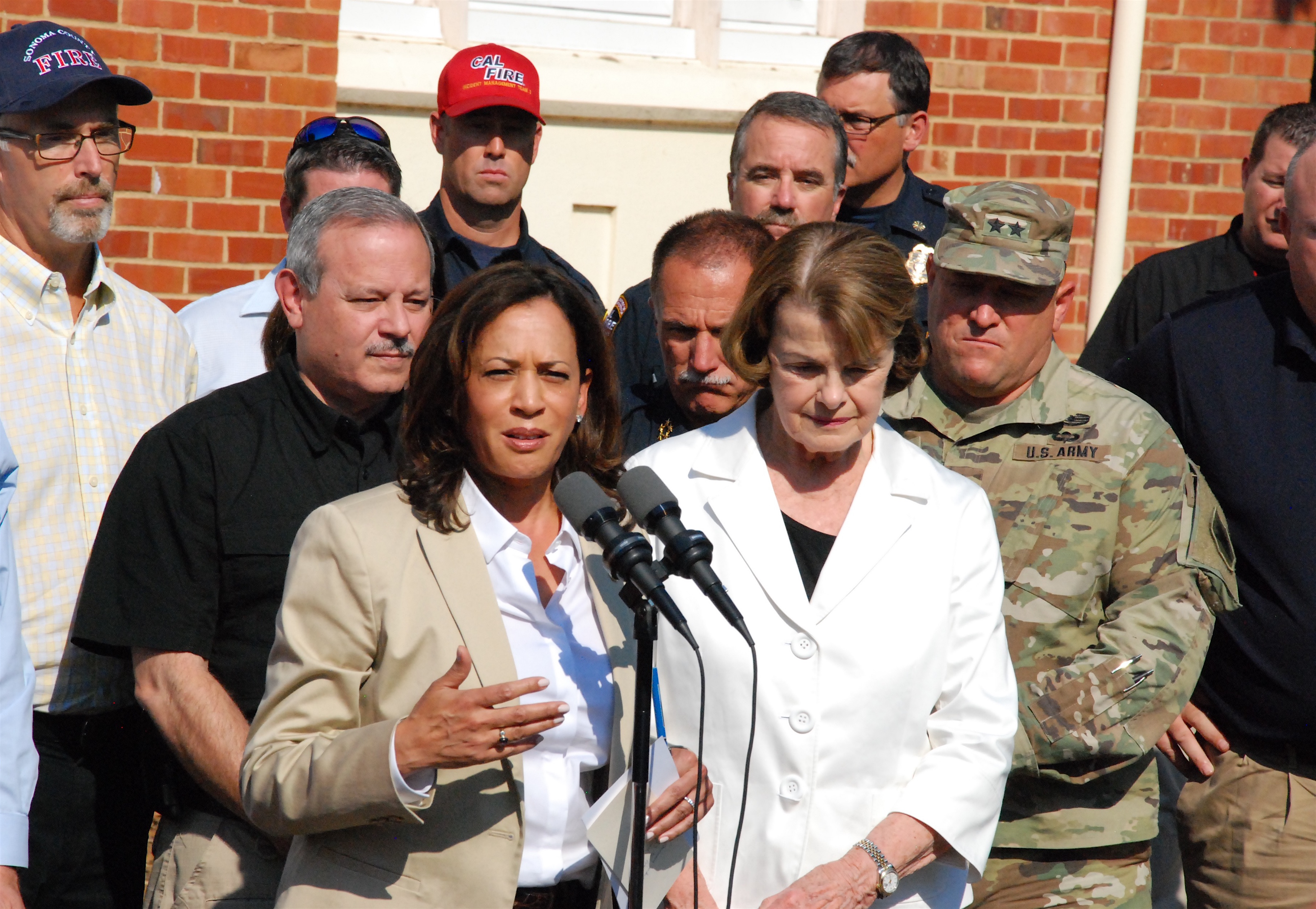
Feinstein (center right) and Kamala Harris (center left) in 2017

Feinstein chaired the United States Congress Joint Committee on Inaugural Ceremonies and acted as mistress of ceremonies, introducing each participant at the 2009 presidential inauguration. She was the first woman to have presided over a U.S. presidential inauguration.

Ahead of the 2016 presidential election, Feinstein was one of 16 female Democratic senators to sign an October 20, 2013, letter endorsing Hillary Clinton for president.

At an August 29, 2017, event in San Francisco, Feinstein expressed hope that Trump could become a good president. "The question is whether he can learn and change", she said. "If so, I believe he can be a good president". The next day, Feinstein released a clarifying statement: "I've been strongly critical of President Trump when I disagree on policy and with his behavior... While I'm under no illusion that it's likely to happen and will continue to oppose his policies, I want President Trump to change for the good of the country".

On January 9, 2018, Feinstein caused a stir when, as ranking member of the Senate Judiciary Committee, she released a transcript of its August 2017 interview with Fusion GPS co-founder Glenn Simpson about the dossier regarding connections between Trump's campaign and the Russian government. She did this unilaterally after the committee's chairman, Chuck Grassley, refused to release the transcript.

As the 2020 presidential election approached, Feinstein indicated her support for former Vice President Joe Biden. This came as a surprise to many pundits, due to the potential candidacy of fellow U.S. Senator from California Kamala Harris, of whom Feinstein said "I'm a big fan of Sen. Harris, and I work with her. But she's brand-new here, so it takes a little bit of time to get to know somebody."

=== Supreme Court nominations ===
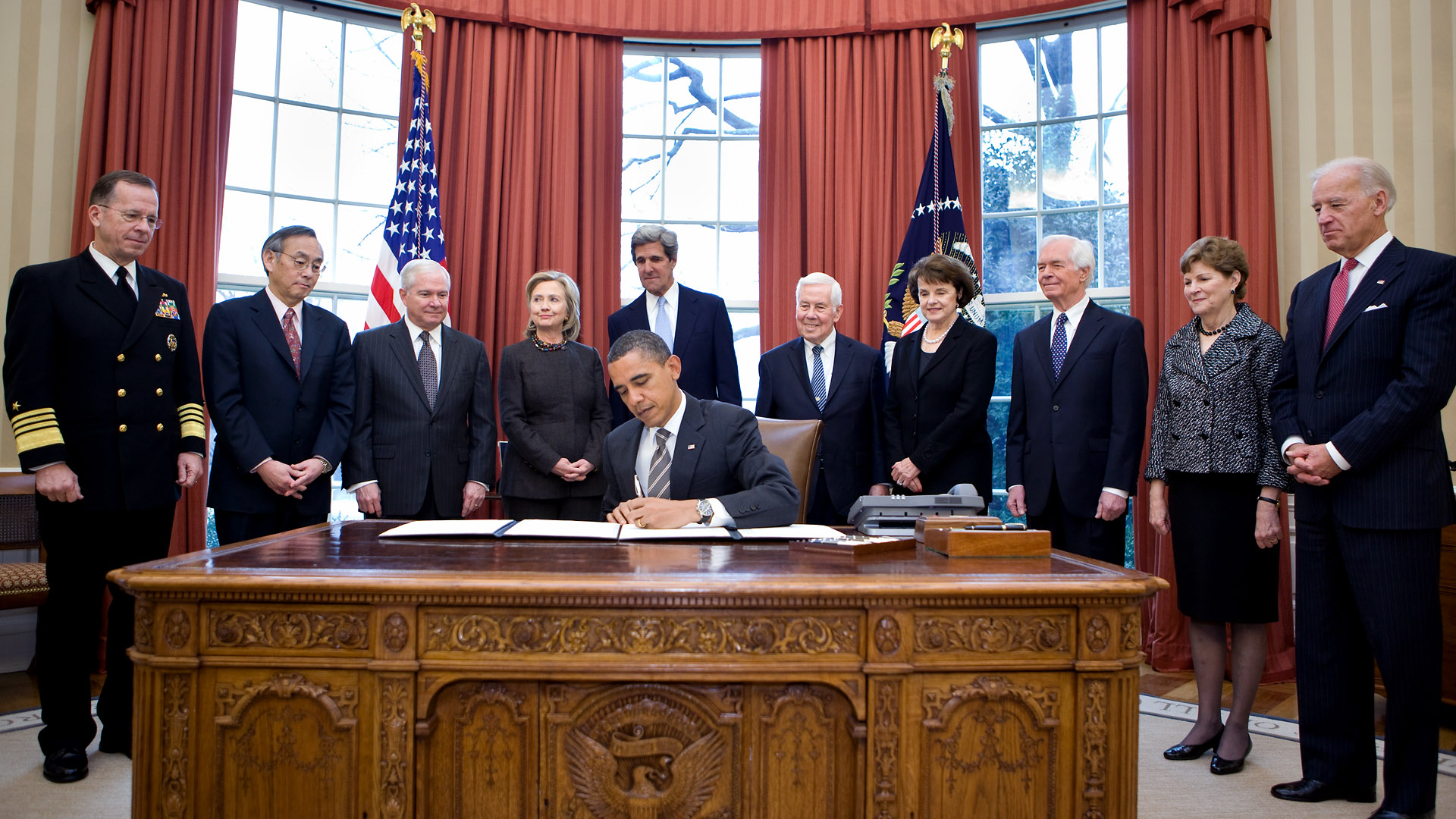
President Barack Obama signs the New START in the Oval Office, February 2, 2011. Feinstein is standing fourth from right.

In September 2005, Feinstein was one of five Democratic senators on the Senate Judiciary Committee to vote against Supreme Court nominee John Roberts, saying that Roberts had "failed to state his positions on such social controversies as abortion and the right to die".

In January 2006, Feinstein said she would vote against Supreme Court nominee Samuel Alito, but expressed disapproval of a filibuster: "When it comes to filibustering a Supreme Court appointment, you really have to have something out there, whether it's gross moral turpitude or something that comes to the surface. This is a man I might disagree with, [but] that doesn't mean he shouldn't be on the court."

On July 12, 2009, Feinstein said the Senate would confirm Supreme Court nominee Sonia Sotomayor, praising her for her experience and for overcoming "adversity and disadvantage".

After President Obama nominated Merrick Garland to the Supreme Court in March 2016, Feinstein met with Garland on April 6 and later called on Republicans to do "this institution the credit of sitting down and meeting with him".

In February 2017, Feinstein requested that Supreme Court nominee Neil Gorsuch provide information on cases in which he had assisted with decision-making. In mid-March, she sent him a letter saying her request had not been met. Feinstein stated her opposition to Gorsuch's nomination on April 3.

After Brett Kavanaugh was nominated to the Supreme Court, Feinstein received a July 30, 2018, letter from Christine Blasey Ford in which Ford accused Kavanaugh of having sexually assaulted her in the 1980s. Ford requested that her allegation be kept confidential. Feinstein did not refer the allegation to the FBI until September 14, 2018, after the Senate Judiciary Committee had completed its hearings on Kavanaugh's nomination and "after leaks to the media about [the Ford allegation] had reached a 'fever pitch'". She faced "sharp scrutiny" for her decision to keep quiet about the Ford allegation for several weeks; she responded that she kept the letter and Ford's identity confidential because Ford had requested it. Feinstein opposed Kavanaugh's nomination. After an additional hearing and a supplemental FBI investigation, Kavanaugh was confirmed to the Supreme Court on October 6, 2018.

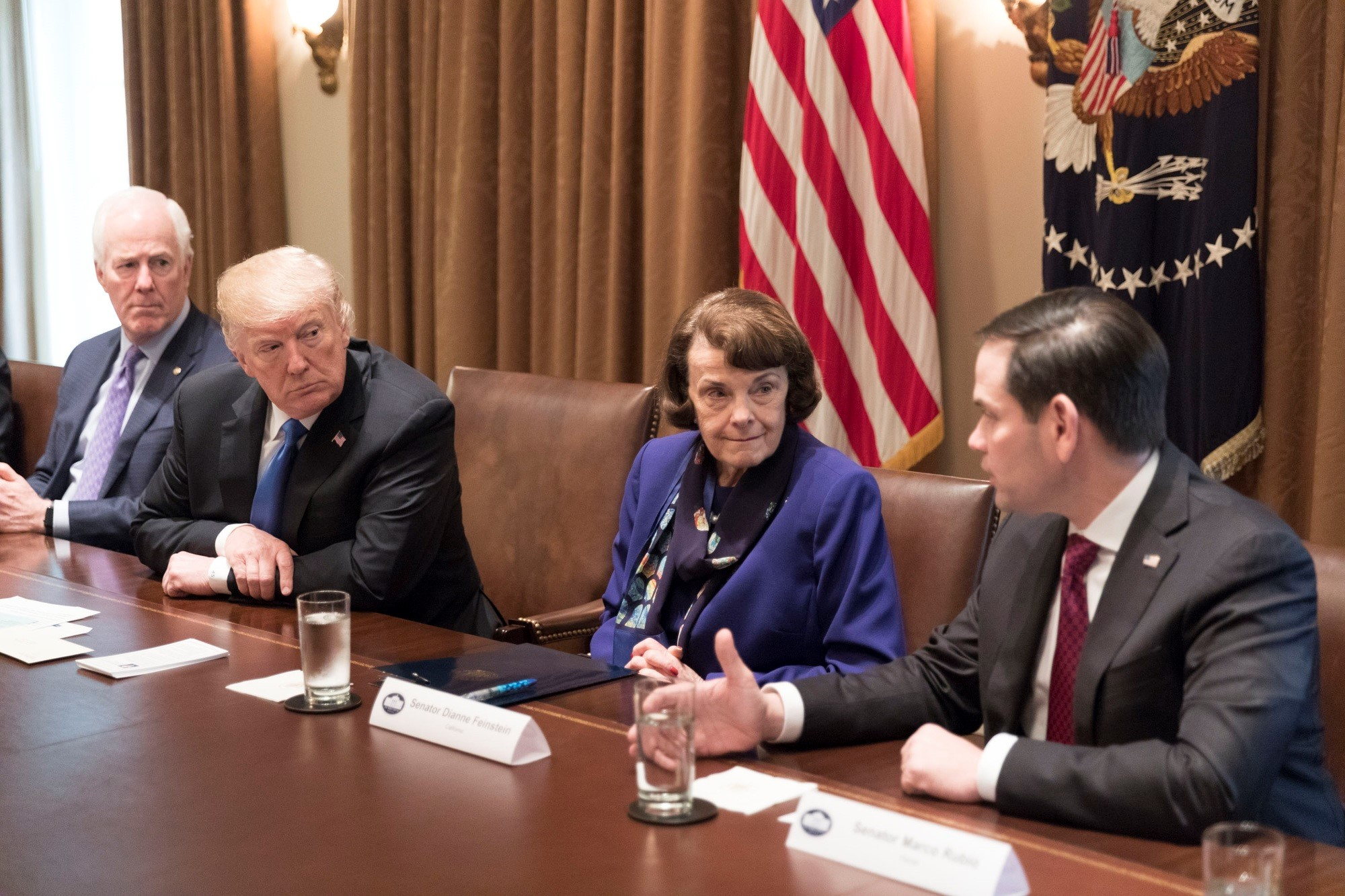
Feinstein with President Donald Trump, John Cornyn, and Marco Rubio to discuss school and community safety in the Cabinet Room at the White House, February 28, 2018

In the fall of 2020, in her capacity as ranking member of the Senate Judiciary Committee, Feinstein participated in the confirmation hearings for President Trump's nomination of Amy Coney Barrett to the Supreme Court. Shortly before the 2020 presidential election, Barrett was nominated to the Court following Justice Ruth Bader Ginsburg's death, and the nomination was intensely controversial. Feinstein opposed Barrett's nomination, but at the conclusion of the hearings, she hugged Republican Senator Lindsey Graham, saying, "this has been one of the best set of hearings that I've participated in". Outraged progressives responded by calling for Feinstein to step down from her leadership role on the committee. Barrett was confirmed to the Court. After the hearings, Senate Minority Leader Chuck Schumer said he had had a "long and serious" talk with Feinstein. After the 2020 election, Feinstein announced that she would not seek to serve as chair or as ranking member of the Judiciary Committee in 2021.

== Awards and honors ==
Feinstein was awarded the honorary degree of Doctor of Laws from Golden Gate University in San Francisco on June 4, 1977. She was awarded the Legion of Honour by France in 1984. Feinstein received with the Woodrow Wilson Award for public service from the Woodrow Wilson Center of the Smithsonian Institution on November 3, 2001, in Los Angeles. In 2002, Feinstein won the American Medical Association's Nathan Davis Award for "the Betterment of the Public Health". She was named as one of The Forward 50 in 2015.

It was announced on January 16, 2024, that the San Francisco International Airport's International Terminal would be named in honor of Feinstein.

== Personal life ==
Feinstein was married three times. She married Jack Berman (d. 2002), who was then working in the San Francisco District Attorney's Office, in 1956. She and Berman divorced three years later. Their daughter, Katherine Feinstein Mariano (b. 1957), was the presiding judge of the San Francisco Superior Court for 12 years, through 2012. In 1962, shortly after beginning her career in politics, Feinstein married her second husband, neurosurgeon Bertram Feinstein, who died of colon cancer in 1978. Feinstein was then married to investment banker Richard C. Blum from 1980 until his death from cancer in 2022.

In 2003, Feinstein was ranked the fifth-wealthiest senator, with an estimated net worth of $26 million. Her net worth increased to between $43 and $99 million by 2005. Her 347-page financial-disclosure statement, characterized by the San Francisco Chronicle as "nearly the size of a phone book", claimed to draw clear lines between her assets and her husband's, with many of her assets in blind trusts.

Feinstein took up pencil drawing as a hobby in the 1990s, primarily depicting scenes from nature and still lifes of flowers taken from her gardens. She later made prints from her original pieces for charity auctions and as gifts to Senate colleagues, ambassadors, and other dignitaries. Despite her works being seen as collector's items, Feinstein considered herself merely "a doodler". (Note: During tributes on the Senate floor the morning following Feinstein's death, senators Mitch McConnell, Susan Collins, Dick Durbin, Alex Padilla, and Kirsten Gillibrand each spoke of the works of art they were gifted by Feinstein.)

=== Decline in health ===
Feinstein had an artificial cardiac pacemaker inserted at George Washington University Hospital in January 2017.

In 2020, investigative journalist Jane Mayer reported that it had been evident to some colleagues and staffers for several years that Feinstein was experiencing cognitive decline. Mayer reported that among various short-term memory issues, Feinstein could not remember Chuck Schumer's repeated attempts to convince her to relinquish her leadership of the Senate Judiciary Committee. Stories of Feinstein's cognitive issues continued to circulate in the press for the last few years of her life: in 2022, The New York Times reported that she struggled to remember her colleagues' names, meetings she had attended, and phone calls she had received. Some colleagues and staffers argued that Feinstein was following in the footsteps of Strom Thurmond, who remained in office with mental infirmity until age 100. The New York Times later said that Feinstein, "by all accounts, was clearly in the later stages of dementia" in her last years.

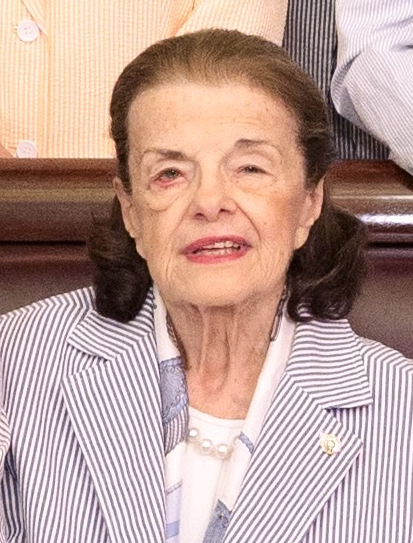
Feinstein in June 2023

In March 2023, Feinstein was diagnosed with shingles and hospitalized. She then suffered complications, including encephalitis (which caused swelling in her brain) and Ramsay Hunt syndrome (which caused paralysis on the left side of her face and problems with her balance and eyesight). These complications delayed her return to the Senate. Feinstein, then 89, returned to the Senate floor in early May 2023 after a 10-week absence. At the time, she used a wheelchair and was described as frail and noticeably thinner. Soon after her return, when asked about her absence, Feinstein told reporters: "I've been here. I've been voting." This remark raised further questions about her memory.

At some point in or before July 2023, Feinstein ceded power of attorney to her daughter, Katherine. In August 2023, Feinstein was hospitalized after falling at her home in San Francisco. A spokesperson said it was "a minor fall" and Feinstein was subsequently cleared to return home.

=== Death and funeral ===
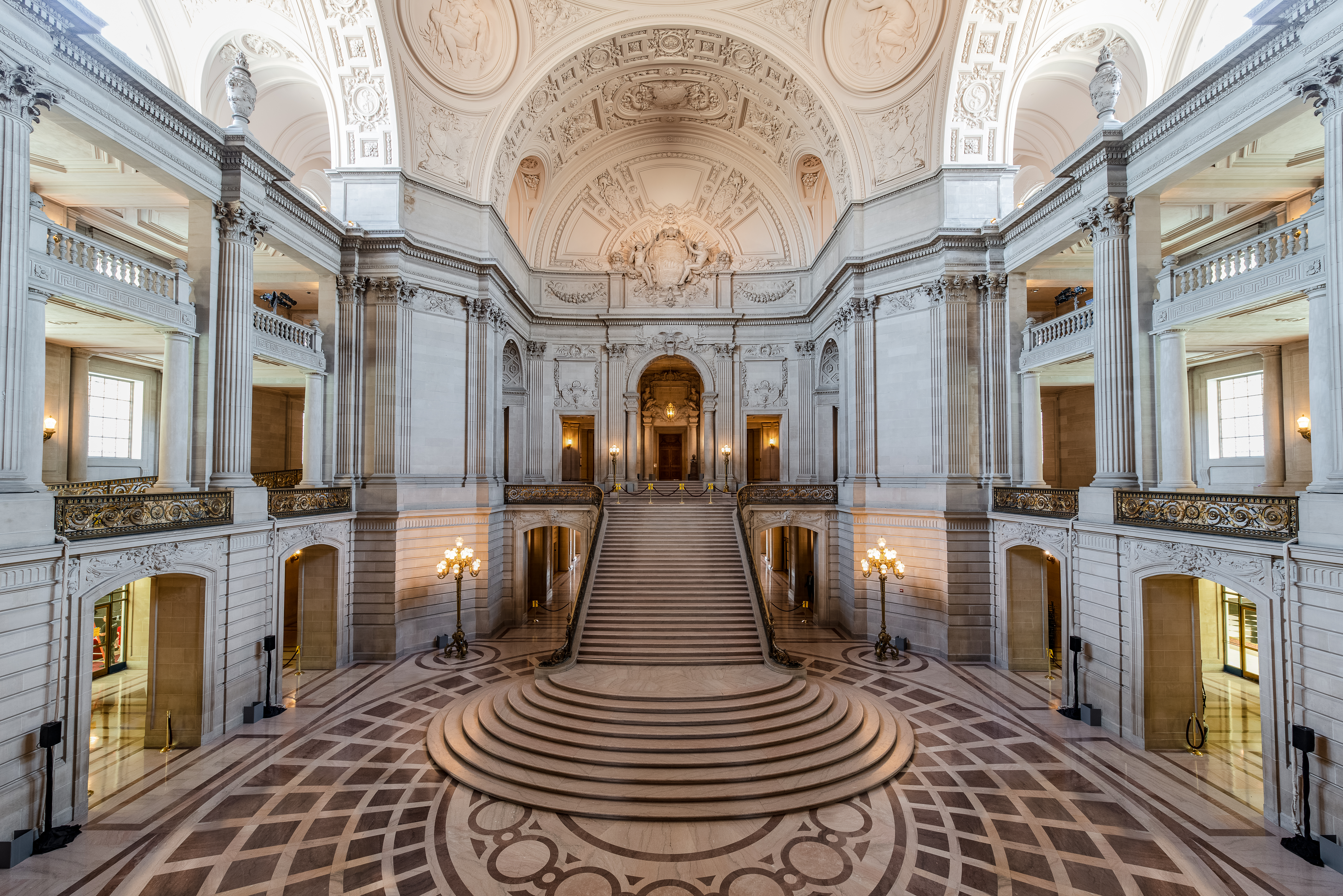
San Francisco City Hall rotunda where Feinstein's body lay in state

Feinstein died of natural causes at her home in Washington, D.C., on September 29, 2023, at the age of 90. Despite longstanding health problems that had caused her to miss Judiciary Committee meetings for several months, her death was sudden; she had cast a vote on the Senate floor the previous day that was needed for Democrats' efforts to avert a government shutdown.

Feinstein received many tributes from politicians such as Senate Majority Leader Chuck Schumer; Senate Minority Leader Mitch McConnell; President Joe Biden; Vice President Kamala Harris, who served with Feinstein during her time in the Senate; former presidents Barack Obama and Bill Clinton; House Speaker Kevin McCarthy; former House Speaker Nancy Pelosi; former Secretary of State, First Lady and Senate colleague Hillary Clinton; fellow Senators Alex Padilla, Bob Casey Jr., Marco Rubio, Bernie Sanders, Susan Collins, Kirsten Gillibrand, Patty Murray, Rick Scott, Josh Hawley, Lindsey Graham, and Chuck Grassley; Representatives Barbara Lee, Adam Schiff, and Katie Porter, who were running for the Democratic nomination for Feinstein's Senate seat in the 2024 election; and California Governor Gavin Newsom.

External videos
- Funeral Service for Sen. Dianne Feinstein, October 5, 2023, C-SPAN

Feinstein's death marked the first time a sitting senator had died since John McCain died in 2018 of brain cancer, and the first time in U.S. history that a female senator died in office.

Feinstein lay in state at San Francisco City Hall on October 4, 2023. A memorial service was held the next day on the front steps of the Hall, and the public was discouraged from attending. At the service, President Biden eulogized Feinstein as "a great American hero"; Vice President Harris added, "You helped move the ball forward, and our nation salutes you"; and a lone protester held a sign saying "If you want the People to feel sad when you die, retire before you go senile". The service was punctuated by flyovers of the Blue Angels, coinciding with San Francisco's Fleet Week. Feinstein was buried between the graves of her two husbands at Hills of Eternity Memorial Park in Colma, California.

On October 1, 2023, Governor Newsom appointed Laphonza Butler to fill Feinstein's vacant Senate seat. He had previously promised to appoint a Black woman in the event of a Senate vacancy. Butler chose not to run for Feinstein's Senate seat in the 2024 election.

== In mass media ==
The 2019 film The Report, about the Senate Intelligence Committee investigation into the CIA's use of torture, extensively features Feinstein, portrayed by Annette Bening.

== See also ==
- 2020 congressional insider trading scandal
- 2024 United States Senate special election in California
- List of members of the United States Congress who died in office (2000–present) § 2020s
- Rosalind Wiener Wyman, co-chair of Feinstein political campaigns
- Women in the United States Senate

== Additional sources ==
- Roberts, Jerry (1994). Dianne Feinstein: Never Let Them See You Cry. HarperCollins. ISBN 0-06-258508-8.

Political offices
Preceded by George Moscone	Mayor of San Francisco; 1978–1988	Succeeded by Art Agnos
Party political offices
Preceded by Tom Bradley	Democratic nominee for Governor of California; 1990	Succeeded by Kathleen Brown
Preceded by Leo McCarthy	Democratic nominee for U.S. Senator from California (Class 1); 1992, 1994, 2000, 2006, 2012, 2018	Succeeded by Adam Schiff
U.S. Senate
Preceded by John Seymour	U.S. senator (Class 1) from California; 1992–2023; Served alongside: Alan Cranston, Barbara Boxer, Kamala Harris, Alex Padilla	Succeeded by Laphonza Butler
Preceded by Vern Ehlers	Chair of the Joint Library Committee; 2007–2009	Succeeded by Bob Brady
Preceded by Trent Lott	Chair of the Senate Rules Committee; 2007–2009	Succeeded by Chuck Schumer
Preceded by Trent Lott	Chair of the Joint Inaugural Ceremonies Committee; 2008–2009	Succeeded by Chuck Schumer
Preceded by Jay Rockefeller	Chair of the Senate Intelligence Committee; 2009–2015	Succeeded by Richard Burr
Preceded by Joe Biden	Chair of the Senate Narcotics Caucus; 2009–2015	Succeeded by Chuck Grassley
Preceded by Saxby Chambliss	Vice Chair of the Senate Intelligence Committee; 2015–2017	Succeeded by Mark Warner
Preceded by Chuck Grassley	Ranking Member of the Senate Narcotics Caucus; 2015–2021	Succeeded by John Cornyn
Preceded by Patrick Leahy	Ranking Member of the Senate Judiciary Committee; 2017–2021	Succeeded by Chuck Grassley
Honorary titles
Preceded by Patrick Leahy	Most senior Democrat in the U.S. Senate; 2023	Succeeded by Patty Murray
Preceded by Frank Lautenberg	Oldest United States Senator; 2013–2023	Succeeded by Chuck Grassley
