= History of the Jews in Saint Petersburg =

The history of the Jews in Saint Petersburg (formerly known as Petrograd and then Leningrad) dates back to the 18th century and there is still a Jewish community in the city today. In the late 18th century, the annexation of eastern Poland meant millions more Jews were now subjects of the Russian Empire, many of whom flocked to the city. When Catherine the Great created the Pale of Settlement to attempt to contain the new Jewish population, Jewish settlement was largely restricted. Under Tsar Alexander II upper class Jews fitting certain criteria were allowed to live in the city, and many other Jews who did not fit these categories settled illegally. By the end of his reign in 1881, the Jewish population of the city was 17,253. Unlike other cities in the Russian Empire, Saint Petersburg never had a pogrom, likely due to the amount of police and army presence it had as the capital. The community continued to grow, despite expulsions and persecution, and flourished creatively until the Bolshevik Revolution. Under the Soviet Union, Jewish life was stifled and repressed, and a number of Saint Petersburg Jews took part in the refusenik movement and underground revival of Jewish nationalism. Today, after the collapse of the Soviet Union, the city remains home to a sizable Jewish community and many Jewish institutions. The Grand Choral Synagogue of Saint Petersburg is the third-largest synagogue in Europe.

== 19th century and pre-revolution history ==
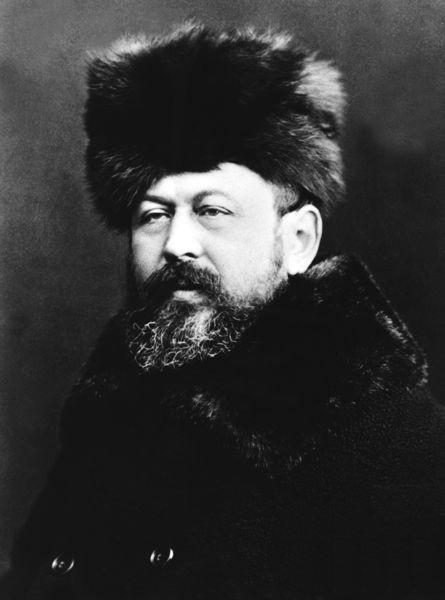
Baron Horace Günzburg 1833–1909, who helped fund and lead the Jewish community after his father.

By the 1880s, Saint Petersburg had become a Jewish cultural center, and over the following decades its intellectuals would produce numerous important works. There were Yiddish, Hebrew, and Russian printing presses which were responsible for the printing of daily, weekly, and monthly newspapers that went to the Jewish communities in the Pale of Settlement.

In addition to being a center for Jewish literary culture, the city was also headquarters for a number of national Jewish organizations, such as The Society for the Promotion of Culture Among the Jews of Russia, and members of the Saint Petersburg community played a key role in establishing the study of Eastern European Jewry. The city's Jewish communal institutions and aid societies were largely depended on the contributions of a few very wealthy Jewish families, notably Joseph Günzburg and his descendants. Beyond funding much of the Jewish community, the Günzburgs also acted as de facto representatives of the community in dealings with the Central Government.

After years of delays and securing permission, the Grand Choral Synagogue in the city was consecrated in 1893, a massive and beautiful building with a seating capacity of 1,200. After its opening, however, the other smaller synagogues in the city were forced to close and the Grand Choral Synagogue became the only place to pray.

Saint Petersburg was also a political center for Jews of all stripes, including socialists and those working for the civil rights of the Jewish community. At the end of the 19th century, Genrikh Sliozberg (Slezberg) and other lawyers founded the Saint Petersburg Defense Bureau. The bureau offered free legal services to Jewish victims of discrimination across the empire, and defended Jews against anti-Semitic accusations, such as ritual murder claims. They also attempted to hold the government accountable for pogroms, although unsuccessfully. Other Jewish organizations in the city also worked to try and improve the lives of impoverished Jews in the Pale of Settlement.

Unlike the Jewish community in the Pale of Settlement, the community in Saint Petersburg was more Russified. In 1897, about a third of the city's Jews reported their native language to be Russian, as opposed to 3% of the Jews in the Pale. Right before the start of World War I, this number had risen to about 50%.

World War I caused mass Jewish migration from battlefield areas in the Pale of Settlement, and the Saint Petersburg community grew to over 50,000, from 35,000 in 1914. A relief agency was set up by local Jews, although the amount of need was overwhelming.

== Revolution and World War II ==
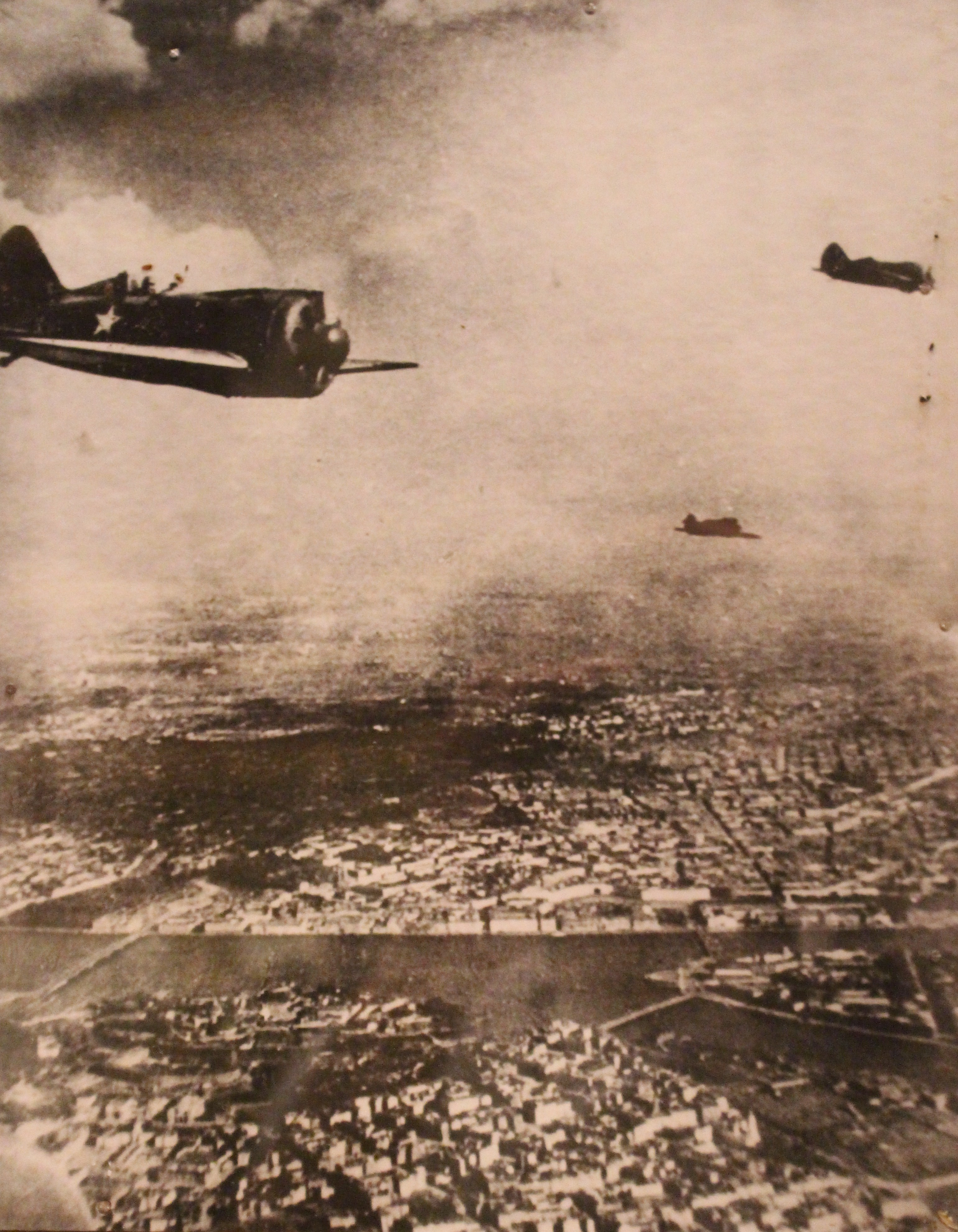
Photo during the Siege of Leningrad

After the February Revolution in 1917, all restrictions on Jewish settlement were removed. In June 1917, the Seventh Conference of the Zionist Organization of Russia was held in Saint Petersburg. After the Bolshevik Revolution in October 1917, Jewish political parties were forced underground. Additionally, the next year the capital was moved from Saint Petersburg to Moscow, and the community become far removed from the centers of power. The famine during the Russian Civil War also hit the community, and some returned to provincial towns. More Jews continued to migrate to the city, however, and in 1926 the Jewish population had reached 84,505 (5.2% of the total population).

Some of the Jewish cultural organizations tried to continue their work under the new Soviet regime, despite facing growing financial and ideological pressure. By the end of the 1920s, however, all independent Jewish institutions were shut down by the government. Many of the intellectuals who ran them left the country. A decade later, the remaining Communist Jewish organizations were also shuttered, and public Jewish identity was heavily suppressed. By the 1930s, a third of the city's Jews were intermarrying non-Jews.

Before the Nazi invasion, the Jewish population of the city was estimated to be 200,000. During the nearly three year long Siege of Leningrad by the Germans, tens of thousands of Jews were among the over one million people who died of starvation or disease.

== Post-war Soviet Union ==
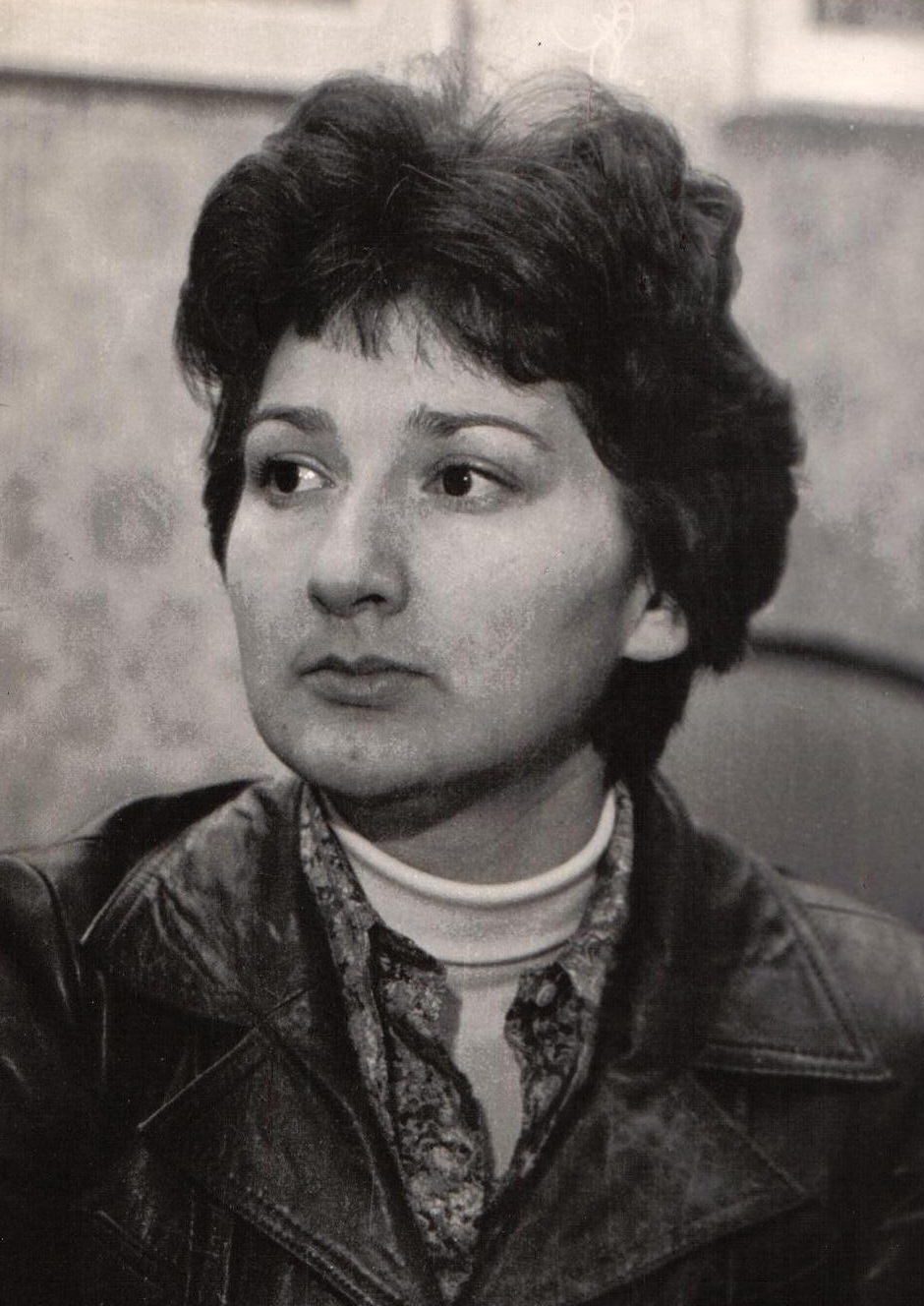
Sylva Zalmanson, a refusenik involved in the hijacking attempt at Leningrad's airport.

The Jewish population of the city, no longer being bolstered by migration, began on a steady decline, largely due to a combination of low birthrates and assimilation. The 1959 census showed the Jewish population to be 162,344, but some estimate that it was more like 200,000.

The Grand Choral Synagogue, still standing despite being bombed by the Nazis, remained the city's only synagogue after the war. In 1962–1964, the matzo baking done by the synagogue was prohibited by the authorities, as it was in many other parts of the Soviet Union. Use of the cemetery was also forbidden in 1963, and it was closed in 1969.

Despite the overall level of assimilation of the Jewish community in the city, after the Six-Day War in the State of Israel, a number of youths in the community began to affiliate themselves with Israel and a Jewish national identity. There were Hebrew classes organized in secret and public protests over the government's refusal to let Jews emigrate to Israel, and a number of refusenik activists were jailed by the government. In 1970, an attempt by a group of young refuseniks, and two non-Jews, to hijack a plane from the city's airport and fly to Israel caught worldwide media attention. Two were sentenced to death, which sparked global outcry, and the capital sentences were eventually commuted.

Just before the collapse of the Soviet Union, the Jewish mortality rate in the city exceeded the birthrate by a factor of more than 10, and two-thirds of newborns registered as Jewish had one parent whose nationality was not Jewish.

== Russian Federation and today ==
Today, the Jewish community in the city is the second largest in Russia, after Moscow. The majority of the Jews there remain secular, but there is also an Orthodox community. While the Jewish population was 107,000 in 1989, after the collapse of the Soviet Union and mass migration of many Jews from Russia to Israel and the United States, the population declined dramatically. As of 2010, the Jewish population was about 40,000.

The Yesod Jewish Community Center (JCC), opened in 2005, houses six of the cities Jewish organizations and offers cultural and educational programs. There is also a Holocaust memorial located in Tsarskoye Selo.
