= The San Francisco model of AIDS care =

The San Francisco model of AIDS care began in 1983 in wards 86 and 5B of San Francisco General Hospital. The focus of this model was not only on the health of each patient with AIDS, but also on the well-being of each person. As AIDS was beginning to be treated as a significant epidemic, San Francisco General Hospital recognized the need to create new standards of care for a disease that had never before been experienced. In attempts to grapple with this new disease, San Francisco General Hospital worked closely with the San Francisco AIDS Foundation and the City and County of San Francisco to develop the San Francisco "model for AIDS care". Compassionate care has now become a priority worldwide and an expected standard in hospitals as there places a greater emphasis on the social, psychological, and economic aspects of treatment in addition to the medicine.

== History ==
As the gay liberation movement began to gain prominence following the Stonewall riots, gay pride and its affiliated political and social actions asserted the acceptance of homosexuals throughout major cities. With this new ideology, San Francisco became one of these many major centers for gay liberation groups. In 1980, 17% of the city's population was homosexual, and more were attracted to this city for its large gay network and supportive environment. The Castro district contained the majority of the gay population, and thus represented the epicenter of homosexuals in San Francisco. Away from the social stigma against them, this concentrated group of gay men participated freely in social rebellion, including liberal participation in sexual practices that were otherwise prohibited. Gay communes, or communal living systems, were also created to celebrate and publicly acknowledge their prideful acceptance of free sexual preferences. With many gay-friendly meeting places existing and a thriving population of gay men, gay bars and bathhouses were created as another hub for available social interaction.

=== AIDS in San Francisco ===
AIDS first erupted within the gay population, initiating the quest to understand the disease that would soon become endemic around the world. A sexually transmitted disease, HIV was especially prominent within this city because of San Francisco's abnormal tolerance for sexual freedoms and gay-friendly places. Bathhouses were a major factor for the spread of this disease, as it acted as a sexual outlet for homosexuals to practice risky behavior. Thus, as one of the largest gay communities, San Francisco suffered from a large number of AIDS cases and had the greatest incidence of AIDS until 1994, especially within the more concentrated area of the Castro District.

The inception of AIDS was initially thought to be contained within the gay population under the title of GRID (gay related immune deficiency). 71% of 3,064 reported cases were of gay and bisexual men; 12% of these cases were in San Francisco. Yet with the first infant case in San Francisco discovered by Dr. Art Ammann in 1982, fear began to spread throughout the remaining population as many realized the disease could also infect through blood contamination. As such, GRID was renamed to AIDS (Acquired Immunodeficiency Syndrome) in 1982— now encompassing the cases found in hemophiliacs, Haitians, and drug users. Because the CDC could only provide strong evidence that AIDS was an infectious disease, not proof, there was no way to alleviate public panic. Casual contact was considered a threat despite claims by Paul Volberding and other respected AIDS doctors because no proof was able to combat these fears. With homophobia, stigma, and a lack of knowledge for this disease, fear was a major motivating factor in interacting with AIDS victims. At San Francisco General Hospital, some doctors and nurses were unwilling to cooperate with or treat AIDS patients for fear of catching this disease, refusing to even enter an AIDS patient's room. For the gay community, this disease was rapid and terrifying. Friends and partners, once active and well, were now ill, unable to care for themselves, and dying. Not knowing how the disease was spread or what prevention methods were available, the gay community was unknowingly infecting itself and increasing the prominence of this disease in their population.

== Care ==
AIDS patients were often ostracized and subjected to homophobic intentions and fear-induced actions. Many treated AIDS as a punishment for the risky lifestyle of the gay community. Consequences of infection included unemployment, increased homophobia, and exclusion. Ryan White, for example, was banned from attending school in his county due to the lack of knowledge and fear of his disease. A New York City TV station refused to interview an AIDS patient for fear of catching this disease. As such, the harsh stigma associated with this disease could also result in a denial for medical treatment in order to avoid the hateful stigma directed towards them. Such stigma thus accelerated the social death of those infected. Excluded from the community and denied the respect of a living person, AIDS infected patients were considered and treated as dead while still alive. This treatment resulted in a lack of will to live, suicidal intentions, and denial for treatment in order to avoid the implications of social death.

=== The model for AIDS care ===
Because AIDS was a multidisciplinary disease, requiring attention in the medical, psychological, and social fields, a new approach had to be made in order to care for AIDS patients. In addition, the majority of AIDS patients were young adults suddenly subjected to the responsibilities of death and the harsh realities of social stigma. As such, hospitals could no longer maintain only the responsibility of medical care, but also adopt different psychosocial support systems. AIDS introduced the social and psychological implications of a disease amidst the many physical aspects that one may inflict. These broader influences reflect what are now commonly referred to as social determinants of health, defined as the social, economic, and political conditions that shape health outcomes and access to care. AIDS patients introduced not only biological, but also psychological, social, and political factors—such as discrimination, isolation, and poverty—into a clinical setting, thus eradicating traditional measures taken to treat disease, and forcing clinics and hospitals to expand their resources to cover these new multidisciplinary requirements.

Specific needs for AIDS care continuum include:

- Self care (personal care, buddy program, attendant)
- Care of home (homemaker-chore worker)
- Food (home delivered meals)
- Residential care (board and care, congregate housing)
- Transportation
- Socialization (social day care)
- Altering home environment in response to functional limitations
- Special care for dying (hospice, counseling, psychiatric care, legal services)
- Medical service at home
- Continuous nursing care
- Emotional psychological problems
- Legal and financial planning
- Employment counseling
- Emergency response
- Protection from abuse

Consideration of these topics is essential in understanding the model of care necessary for those patients inflicted with this disease. This model may also be used to improve the care in other disease.

In obtaining substantial progress to accomplish these new requirements, volunteers were essential to this cause. Professionals would volunteer time to assist patients. Interior designers created comfortable spaces, legal workers helped make wills, florists provided flowers, and other people would donate food, games, and toys for the patients and their families. Volunteers from the community provided entertainment to patients through tap dancing, and others baked brownies laced with marijuana. Specific support groups were available to meet any circumstance, for example, groups for inpatients, Hispanic women, or the transgender community; they were also available for the care-takers, burdened with the death toll of so many patients. As a result, it became essential to adopt this new form of care— focusing on the social and psychological implications of this disease. Mobilization against AIDS includes caring for the sick, and increased involvement— not only on stopping the infection itself.

A variety of community organizations were developed afterward as a response to those suffering from this disease. A large impact of these organizations was providing support and personal contact to a patient that was normally met with discrimination. Extra attention on people with AIDS helped them feel welcomed and important to a society that victimized and ostracized them. Volunteer organizations also reduced costs for already limited hospital funding. The Shanti Project, in addition to providing buddy programs and counselors, teamed up with the city and county of San Francisco to arrange low cost housing options for AIDS patients. In this way, the city leased housing units to Shanti and thus allowed patients to live under the care of Shanti and other agencies. By living in these provided housing units, patients were also able to create support systems within them, thus decreasing the need for inpatient services. As such, hospitals were able to reduce costs by increasing outpatient management with the help of volunteer agencies.

Other organizations include The San Francisco AIDS Foundation, which provided financial and social assistance, food donations, and education programs through community forums discussing AIDS therapy, sexual risk reduction, and AIDS virus antibody testing. This program also provided aid through telephone hotlines and physical referrals. The Hospice of San Francisco and the Visiting Nurse Association provided in-home and special care, allowing patients to reduce overall hospitalizations and maintain the option of having an at-home death. People with AIDS Alliance was a network of AIDS patients that emphasized the importance of people with AIDS as vital members of their communities and not as victims. This program supported AIDS patients by advocating and providing education, recreational programs, retreats and support groups for them.

A growing body of research during the HIV/AIDS epidemic began to highlight the relationship between food insecurity and HIV outcomes, which helped to inform the development of the "Food is Medicine" (FIM) approach and other nutrition-based interventions. FIM initiatives aim to reduce chronic illnesses and food insecurity through diet and nutrition. While food has been used as a form of medicine throughout human history, "the community-based strand of FIM had origins in the HIV/AIDS epidemic". Studies have shown that "food insecurity is associated with increased HIV transmission risk behaviors and decreased access to HIV treatment and care". In some contexts, individuals experiencing food insecurity were more likely to get involved in sex work or engage in transactional sex to obtain food, in which negotiating safe sex practices could become more difficult. These findings demonstrated the importance of addressing nutritional needs as part of comprehensive HIV care, and they contributed to the emergence of the community-based FIM approaches.

One FIM-based organization that emerged during this time was Project Open Hand, which delivered meals to people with AIDS. The organization was founded under the recognition of the importance of social services and nutritious foods for those infected with HIV, as treatment for HIV did not exist at the time. In doing so, Project Open Hand addressed the nutritional needs of individuals with AIDS, and it provided them with social support and human connection, helping to affirm the dignity of patients who were often marginalized. Project Open Hand, along with other programs and organizations at the time, formed the basis for which the approach of FIM emerged out of San Francisco.

=== The San Francisco Model ===
Paul Volberding was one of the first to notice the sudden increase in Kaposi Sarcoma (KS) cases in young gay men. In time, he learned the correlation between this cancer and AIDS infection, and thus began his career with AIDS patients. As an oncologist, he was also able to recognize the emotional toll the disease inflicts upon these patients, and was aware of the psychosocial care that would be required of them. In this way Volberding was one of the first to help implement this new and necessary model of care—multidisciplinary and directed towards patients' well-being. Dubbed the San Francisco model of care, this model removed the social death of AIDS by directing attention and care towards the patients as humans—not as helpless victims. Priority was now given to patient advocacy, care, and education rather than on the sole concern of avoiding death.

This model of care was first recognized in wards 86 and 5B, respectively the outpatient and inpatient wards of San Francisco General Hospital. Both were created with the intention to improve the care directed towards AIDS patients. Outpatient clinic ward 86 was co-founded by Volberding and was initially started as a KS clinic at UCSF. Yet surrounded by fear and homophobia, patients in this clinic were neglected by caretakers, rejected, and treated poorly—subjected to appalling treatment, patients were forced to change their own sheets, food was left outside instead of brought into rooms, and floors hosting AIDS patients were avoided. In addition, UCSF hospital feared exposing other patients to this disease and labeling their renown hospital as a center for disease. As such, Volberding's KS clinic was moved to San Francisco General Hospital where it then received its current name of ward 86. Recognizing the expense of hospitalizations and the hardships of this disease, this outpatient ward provided AIDS patients with an environment that was responsive and conducive to the accompanying struggles of their disease.

Inspired by the model of care demonstrated in ward 86, an inpatient clinic—ward5B— was created in 1983 to implement similar values for care. Cliff Morrison, a nurse and advocate for AIDS patients, was responsible for creating this ward. Originally opposing the creation of a separate unit, Morrison wanted to diminish stigma and discrimination towards these patients by keeping them with other patients in the hospital. Yet with ongoing fear and homophobic hostilities, it became apparent to create an AIDS specific unit for the AIDS patients and staff where proper treatment could be expected and not hoped for. Ward 5B was specifically led by volunteer nurses to ensure genuine care as a passion and not a burden. Demands of this job were incredibly high—emotionally and physically— as the majority of patients died, and lack of funding did not allow for nurses to be paid for all the hours worked. Yet because of this voluntary system, ward 5B supported an environment of sincerity and humane care— attention directed towards patients and not only on the medicine. Both wards demonstrated a holistic approach towards care. Physicians were no longer in charge, but teams of people— social workers, physicians, nurses, volunteers, nutritionists, and mental health staff—collaborated for the patients’ benefit. The clinical approach to this disease emulated oncology models, requiring a strong infrastructure of nurses and social support. Exceptions were made for patients—visitor hours never ended, items from home were brought to the patients’ rooms— often because supervisors were unwilling to get involved with the novel ward and the risks associated with it. Yet because of these changes, patients were given more control over their medical decisions and hospitalization.

Originally a county hospital, it was common for San Francisco General to receive inmates or homeless patients—those with less resources. As such, those without insurance, first attending Haight-Ashbury Free Clinic, would receive care until conditions worsened enough to merit a visit to San Francisco General Hospital (academia article), whereas those with insurance went to UCSF hospital. Thus, middle, middle-upper class patients were less willing to receive care from this county hospital, but because of the model of care demonstrated within this hospital, San Francisco General became a sought-after establishment rather than a last-resort place for the poor and uninsured.

=== Caregivers ===
Caregivers played an essential role in this model of care. As noted, they acted as an emotional and social outlet for patients isolated from normal human contact because of their disease. AIDS, in this way, was and still is a nursing disease. Nurses provide for the opportunistic infections, mental well-being, and social health of the patient—seeing more patients, and initiating interactions with them, nurses and not doctors remained the most experienced in AIDS care. Not only did caregivers provide for complex mental and social needs, but also for simple chores such as laundry, cooking, cleaning, and organizing appointments. Care was also provided through informal social networks— support among people who could understand the true reality of AIDS, and who are accepted as a person and not a burden to be abandoned. The trust, concern, and compassion freely provided by these caretakers were essential for the emotional well-being of AIDS patients, especially for those unaccustomed to reaching out for help. People often chose to become a caregiver as a responsibility to care for a family member, lover, or friend. Others volunteered with the hope of helping others through advising or supporting. Yet both nurses and patients were placed in undesirable positions. The patient, forced to cope with this disease, and the nurse, forced to cope with helplessness. A caregivers job was difficult in that they were responsible for a dying patient— his mood swings, associated stigma, and oncoming death. In effect, nurses often were unable to sleep, emotionally numbed by the pain suffered by these patients, and physically drained from the chores required of them. Because AIDS patients were often in the same age group as the caregivers— an age categorizing healthful youth— it was especially difficult for nurses to watch patients die. As a result, emotional support groups are also necessary for these social and emotional outlets for AIDS patients— those suffering from care-related depression. The continuance of this model is reliant on the prominence of caretakers. In this way, training the next generation of caretakers must include rotation through HIV units and experience with the many stages of HIV care in order to ensure this model of care remains within hospital settings.

=== A Future Model ===
The UNAIDS 90-90-90 target is aiming to have 90% of people living with AIDS knowing of their diagnosis, 90% of those infected being treated, and 90% of those on treatment suppressing their virus by 2020. With this goal in mind, the model of care has been readily adopted by cities to facilitate this intention. By understanding the importance of outpatients clinics, cities are able to adopt this model by providing resources necessary for those who are no longer in need of acute inpatient care, but are still in need of emergency housing, longer-term housing, hospice care and support systems— programs made possible by implementation of this model of care. As such, there is also an economic benefit with this model in that organizing care for patients can reduce a hospital stay and allow for the patient to be cared by the volunteers and organizations associated with this model. With the many variations among different cities, this model itself will not be identical nationwide, but rather the idea of care and intentions for the actions facilitated by this model will be recognized among the many variations that will exist.

Created in 1988, the University of Alabama's 1917 clinic is modeled after the San Francisco model of care. A community based clinic that prioritizes patients, it is able to focus on the needs of patients rather than only on the implications of medicine. In this way, the clinic has placed a greater emphasis on helping the low income and uninsured population—stigmatized as marginalized and unimportant to society. One method for monitoring patients in order to maintain viral suppression and consistent use of medication is through electronic medical records. As a result, 71% of the patient population had a virally suppressed load in 2012— similar to that of San Francisco General. Though the homosexual population is still the most affected in terms of size, there has been an increase in AIDS infections among African American and Hispanic gay and bisexual men. In this way, the current model of care is emphasizing a focus on minority and marginalized populations and not only on the white homosexual population of San Francisco in 1983. The fight to eradicate the effects of stigmatization and discrimination directed towards AIDS patients remains constant, though the focus must expand to include other populations that are infected. The model now includes addressing the health of disadvantaged populations and not only on the maintenance of community involvement and emotional support. In this way, it may not only advance public health, but also social justice.

Thus, the future of this model must now depend on the responsiveness of the health care system in order to ensure that current at-risk populations will continue to use these programs and remain in them. Health care must address medical discrimination and unsatisfactory experiences in order to ensure the continuance and effectiveness of this model of care. The different implications of marginalized populations must be considered in continuing this model, adding greater emphasis on mental and health substance abuse services, or increasing the involvement of family members. In addition, this model of care must now adapt to an older generation of patients. As the young AIDS patients of the 1980s are now able to live longer with ART treatment, PReP, and a possible future vaccination, these create different circumstances that must be considered. With AIDS infecting a greater variety of people, more resources and a broader outlook will be needed in order to maintain this model of care.
