= 1994 United States Senate election in California =

- November 8, 1994
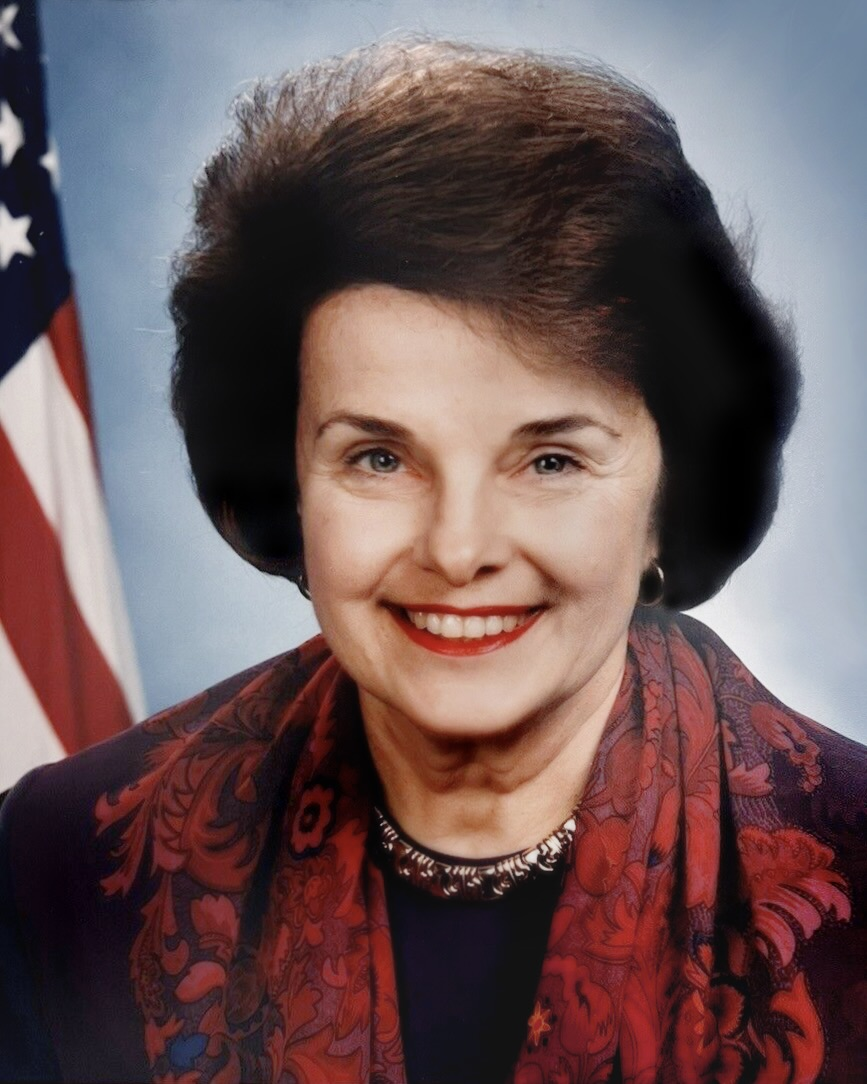

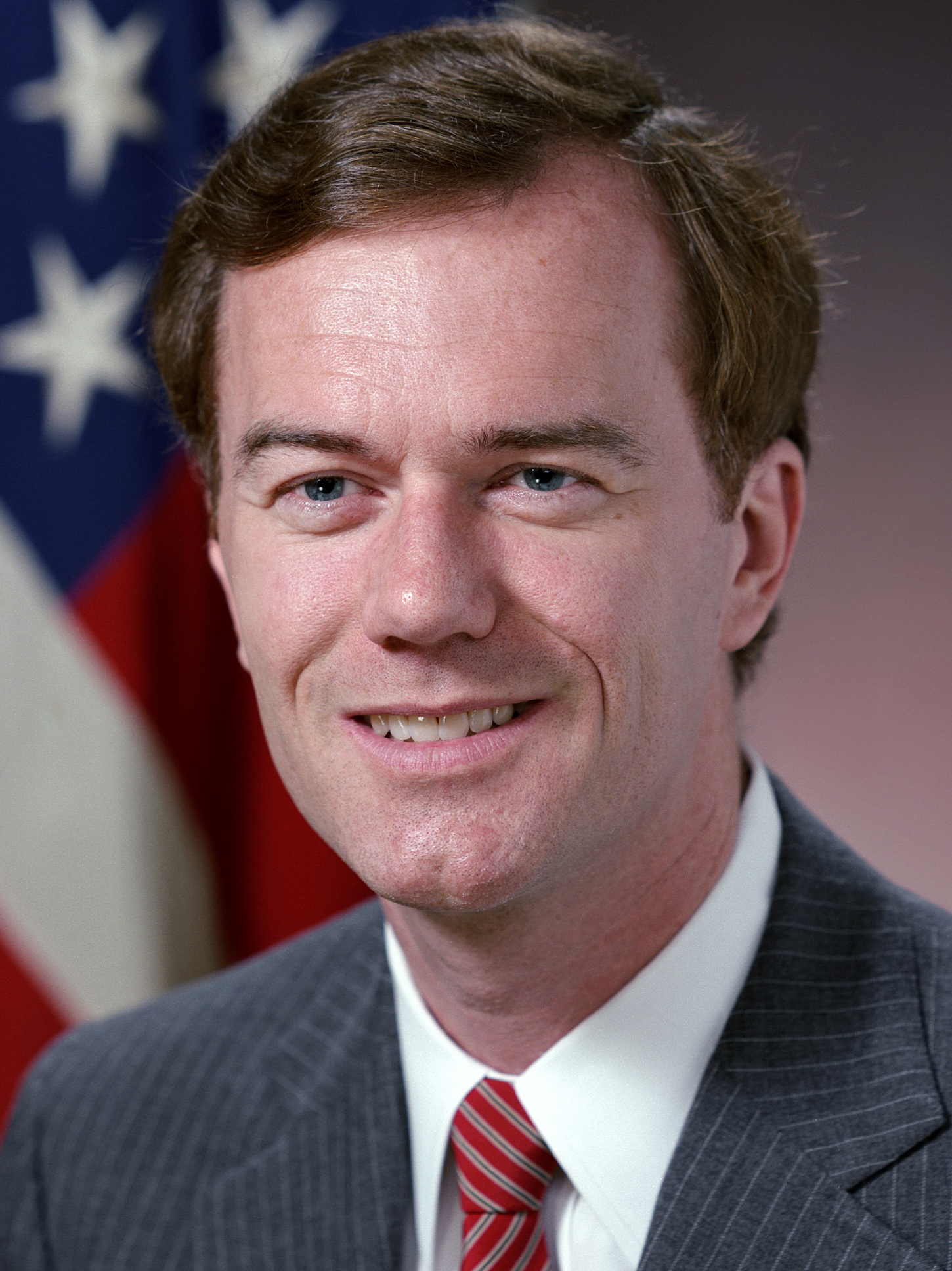
Nominee	Dianne Feinstein	Michael Huffington
Party	Democratic	Republican
Popular vote	3,979,152	3,817,025
Percentage	46.74%	44.83%
- Feinstein: 40–50% 50–60% 60–70% 70–80% Huffington: 40–50% 50–60% 60–70%
U.S. senator before election
Dianne Feinstein
Democratic
Elected U.S. Senator
Dianne Feinstein
Democratic

The 1994 United States Senate election in California was held November 8, 1994. Democratic incumbent Dianne Feinstein won re-election to a second term in office over Republican congressman Michael Huffington. Feinstein won by a margin of 1.89 percentage points, making this the closest election of the 1994 Senate elections. This was the first time that any Democratic incumbent was re-elected to this seat.

== Democratic primary ==
=== Candidates ===
- Ted J. Andromedas, Los Angeles sales consultant
- Dianne Feinstein, incumbent U.S. senator since 1992
- Daniel O'Dowd, founder and president of Green Hills Software

=== Results ===
Democratic primary
Party	Candidate	Votes	%
Democratic	Dianne Feinstein (incumbent)	1,635,837	74.20%
Democratic	Ted J. Andromedas	297,128	13.48%
Democratic	Daniel O'Dowd	271,615	12.32%
Total votes		2,204,580	100.00%

== Republican primary ==
=== Candidates ===
- John M. Brown, Stockton salesman
- Wolf G. Dalichau, Los Angeles baker
- William E. Dannemeyer, former U.S. representative from Fullerton and 1992 candidate for Senate
- Michael Huffington, U.S. representative from Santa Barbara
- Kate Squires, Corona attorney and businesswoman

=== Results ===
Republican primary
Party	Candidate	Votes	%
Republican	Michael Huffington	1,072,358	55.43%
Republican	William E. Dannemeyer	565,864	29.25%
Republican	Kate Squires	202,950	10.49%
Republican	Wolf G. Dalichau	58,307	3.01%
Republican	John M. Brown	35,212	1.82%
Total votes		1,934,691	100.00

== Other nominations ==
=== Peace & Freedom Party ===
Peace & Freedom primary
Party	Candidate	Votes	%
Peace and Freedom	Elizabeth Cervantes Barron	3,487	70.70
Peace and Freedom	Larry D. Hampshire	1,445	29.30
Total votes		4,932	100.00

=== Libertarian Party ===
Libertarian primary
Party	Candidate	Votes	%
Libertarian	Richard Boddie	120,622	100.00
Total votes		120,622	100.00

=== American Independent Party ===
American Independent primary
Party	Candidate	Votes	%
American Independent	Paul Meeuwenberg	13,596	100.00
Total votes		13,596	100.00

=== Green Party ===
While there was no primary election for the Green Party, Barbara Blong got the nomination of the party and represented them in the general election.

== General election ==
=== Candidates ===
- Elizabeth Cervantes Barron, San Jose special education teacher (Peace and Freedom)
- Barbara Blong, San Francisco teacher (Green)
- Richard Benjamin Boddie, Huntington Beach public speaker (Libertarian)
- Dianne Feinstein, incumbent U.S. senator since 1992 (Democratic)
- Michael Huffington, U.S. representative from Santa Barbara (Republican)
- Paul Meeuwenberg, Los Angeles marketing consultant (American Independent)

=== Campaign ===
After one term in the House representing Santa Barbara and San Luis Obispo counties, Huffington spent $8 million by the end of August and a total of $28 million during the entire campaign. He became wealthy off oil and gas. The race saw personal attacks on Huffington's wife, Arianna Huffington, who was very involved in the race (the media dubbed her the "Sir Edmund Hillary of social climbing," according to The Almanac of American Politics).

Huffington was called a hypocrite for supporting Proposition 187 and then breaking the law for employing illegal aliens, a story which came out in the race's final days. $44 million was spent in the election. At the time, it was the most expensive campaign in a non-presidential election in American history. Chris Cillizza of The Washington Post named the election one of the nastiest senate elections in modern history.

=== Results ===
On election day it was a very close race, but Feinstein won Los Angeles County, which may have pulled her ahead. Her sizable win in the nine-county San Francisco Bay Area may also be credited to her slim statewide victory. A large number of absentee ballots left the results in doubt for over two weeks. On November 18, Senator Feinstein declared victory. At that time, she was ahead by 147,404 votes, with only 156,210 remaining uncounted ballots. Huffington had not conceded at that point, saying that there was evidence of voter fraud and calling for an investigation. He had already filed a legal complaint, which had already been dismissed. As of December 23, Huffington still contended that there may have been voting fraud and had not conceded.

1994 United States Senate election in California
Party	Candidate	Votes	%
Democratic	Dianne Feinstein (incumbent)	3,979,152	46.74%
Republican	Michael Huffington	3,817,025	44.83%
Peace and Freedom	Elizabeth Cervantes Barron	255,301	3.00%
Libertarian	Richard Benjamin Boddie	179,100	2.10%
American Independent	Paul Meeuwenberg	142,771	1.68%
Green	Barbara Blong	140,567	1.65%
Write-in		173	<0.01%
Invalid or blank votes		386,547	4.34% (Note: "Votes not cast" as a percentage of votes cast anywhere statewide, which numbered 8,900,593.)
Majority		162,127	1.90%
Total votes		8,514,089	100.00%
Turnout			44.94% (Note: As a percentage of the voting eligible population (VEP), estimated at 18.946 million.)
Democratic hold			

==== By county ====
Final results from the Secretary of State.

County	Feinstein	Votes	Huffington	Votes	Barron	Votes	Boddie	Votes	Others	Votes
San Francisco	79.16%	185,543	15.39%	36,083	1.90%	4,452	1.05%	2,472	2.50%	5,854
Marin	70.86%	74,664	24.42%	25,733	1.31%	1,380	1.39%	1,462	2.02%	2,125
Alameda	68.34%	271,456	25.21%	100,120	2.35%	9,323	1.45%	5,778	2.65%	10,539
San Mateo	64.24%	136,686	29.94%	63,702	2.05%	4,362	1.50%	3,187	2.28%	4,850
Contra Costa	57.94%	170,256	36.02%	105,854	2.06%	6,056	1.51%	4,437	2.47%	7,268
Sonoma	57.53%	91,164	34.04%	53,938	2.94%	4,653	2.01%	3,178	3.48%	5,519
Santa Cruz	57.07%	52,056	32.31%	29,466	3.96%	3,613	2.49%	2,267	4.17%	3,807
Santa Clara	55.79%	245,232	35.93%	157,922	2.96%	13,029	2.14%	9,403	3.18%	13,983
Yolo	54.87%	26,793	36.56%	17,851	3.18%	1,553	1.86%	906	3.54%	1,729
Los Angeles	51.53%	1,046,026	40.38%	819,594	3.35%	67,993	1.97%	39,952	2.78%	56,332
Solano	51.01%	49,920	41.03%	40,158	2.90%	2,834	1.68%	1,645	3.38%	3,312
Napa	50.73%	21,340	41.33%	17,388	2.33%	982	1.82%	766	3.78%	1,592
Mendocino	50.27%	15,008	39.90%	11,912	3.20%	955	2.72%	812	3.92%	1,169
Sacramento	47.85%	168,073	43.88%	154,128	2.85%	9,994	1.84%	6,446	3.58%	12,584
Santa Barbara	47.16%	60,811	43.29%	55,825	2.84%	3,664	2.29%	2,956	4.41%	5,686
Alpine	46.72%	313	42.09%	282	4.93%	33	2.24%	15	4.03%	27
Monterey	46.52%	42,246	43.94%	39,905	4.20%	3,814	1.55%	1,411	3.79%	3,439
Humboldt	46.04%	21,817	43.77%	20,742	2.54%	1,202	2.31%	1,093	5.35%	2,534
Lake	44.76%	8,675	46.66%	9,043	2.32%	449	2.33%	451	3.94%	763
San Benito	40.89%	4,735	47.28%	5,476	5.32%	616	2.13%	247	4.38%	507
San Joaquin	39.89%	50,218	52.00%	65,466	2.88%	3,622	1.55%	1,954	3.69%	4,646
Fresno	39.70%	69,892	52.73%	92,818	3.33%	5,866	1.38%	2,426	2.86%	5,033
Tuolumne	39.54%	7,693	52.26%	10,169	2.46%	479	2.11%	410	3.63%	706
Merced	39.02%	15,092	52.67%	20,372	3.44%	1,329	1.59%	616	3.29%	1,272
Stanislaus	38.93%	38,414	51.91%	51,224	3.21%	3,169	1.68%	1,658	4.27%	4,217
Ventura	38.57%	82,472	50.98%	108,993	3.59%	7,671	2.70%	5,773	4.16%	8,891
San Luis Obispo	38.36%	32,777	51.83%	44,285	2.74%	2,345	2.49%	2,127	4.57%	3,905
Imperial	38.33%	9,086	49.46%	11,724	7.32%	1,735	1.38%	328	3.51%	832
Amador	38.25%	4,950	53.32%	6,900	1.94%	251	2.23%	288	4.26%	551
San Diego	37.82%	279,249	53.17%	392,529	3.08%	22,745	2.48%	18,314	3.45%	25,441
Nevada	37.37%	13,987	53.64%	20,076	2.06%	771	2.73%	1,023	4.19%	1,570
Placer	36.93%	27,934	54.28%	41,058	2.33%	1,759	2.20%	1,666	4.27%	3,231
El Dorado	36.77%	19,888	54.37%	29,402	2.05%	1,109	2.46%	1,331	4.35%	2,352
Plumas	36.53%	3,082	54.03%	4,559	2.71%	229	2.61%	220	4.12%	348
Mono	35.98%	1,263	53.25%	1,869	2.42%	85	2.48%	87	5.87%	206
Mariposa	35.53%	2,520	55.20%	3,915	2.23%	158	2.26%	160	4.78%	339
Calaveras	35.17%	5,467	54.30%	8,441	2.32%	360	2.90%	450	5.31%	826
Siskiyou	34.58%	6,256	55.50%	10,040	2.92%	529	2.59%	468	4.41%	798
Del Norte	34.51%	2,553	56.16%	4,154	2.16%	160	2.22%	164	4.95%	366
Butte	34.45%	23,317	57.03%	38,600	2.64%	1,789	2.20%	1,492	3.68%	2,490
Sierra	34.25%	548	54.31%	869	3.06%	49	3.94%	63	4.44%	71
Kings	33.98%	7,592	56.96%	12,725	3.79%	846	1.45%	323	3.82%	854
Riverside	33.95%	115,333	56.11%	190,615	3.41%	11,582	2.58%	8,755	3.96%	13,438
San Bernardino	33.34%	114,027	55.95%	191,343	3.73%	12,752	2.89%	9,876	4.09%	13,986
Madera	32.56%	8,613	59.26%	15,675	2.84%	750	1.71%	452	3.63%	960
Lassen	32.44%	2,639	56.51%	4,597	2.83%	230	2.79%	227	5.43%	442
Orange	31.88%	239,010	58.87%	441,398	2.71%	20,308	2.92%	21,901	3.62%	27,175
Trinity	31.87%	1,703	54.53%	2,914	3.71%	198	3.89%	208	6.01%	321
Tulare	31.45%	24,244	59.77%	46,074	3.72%	2,871	1.76%	1,359	3.29%	2,535
Yuba	29.70%	4,158	59.75%	8,365	3.06%	429	2.44%	341	5.05%	707
Colusa	29.34%	1,449	63.29%	3,126	2.77%	137	1.48%	73	3.12%	154
Tehama	27.94%	5,142	61.55%	11,329	2.84%	522	2.67%	492	5.00%	921
Shasta	27.83%	15,077	62.99%	34,129	2.51%	1,362	2.21%	1,200	4.46%	2,417
Sutter	27.23%	5,958	65.09%	14,242	2.55%	559	1.63%	357	3.50%	766
Kern	26.63%	39,987	63.61%	95,504	3.43%	5,153	2.15%	3,229	4.17%	6,259
Inyo	25.96%	1,841	64.95%	4,606	2.51%	178	2.14%	152	4.44%	315
Modoc	24.77%	951	63.72%	2,447	2.55%	98	3.23%	124	5.73%	220
Glenn	24.68%	1,956	67.51%	5,351	2.01%	159	1.63%	129	4.18%	331

Counties that flipped from Democratic to Republican

- Amador
- Imperial
- Calaveras
- Del Norte
- San Benito
- Nevada
- Mariposa
- San Luis Obispo
- Lake
- Tuolumne
- Merced
- Placer
- San Diego
- San Joaquin
- Stanislaus
- Mono
- Plumas
- Sierra

== See also ==
- 1994 United States Senate elections
