= Michael Huffington =

American politician (born 1947)

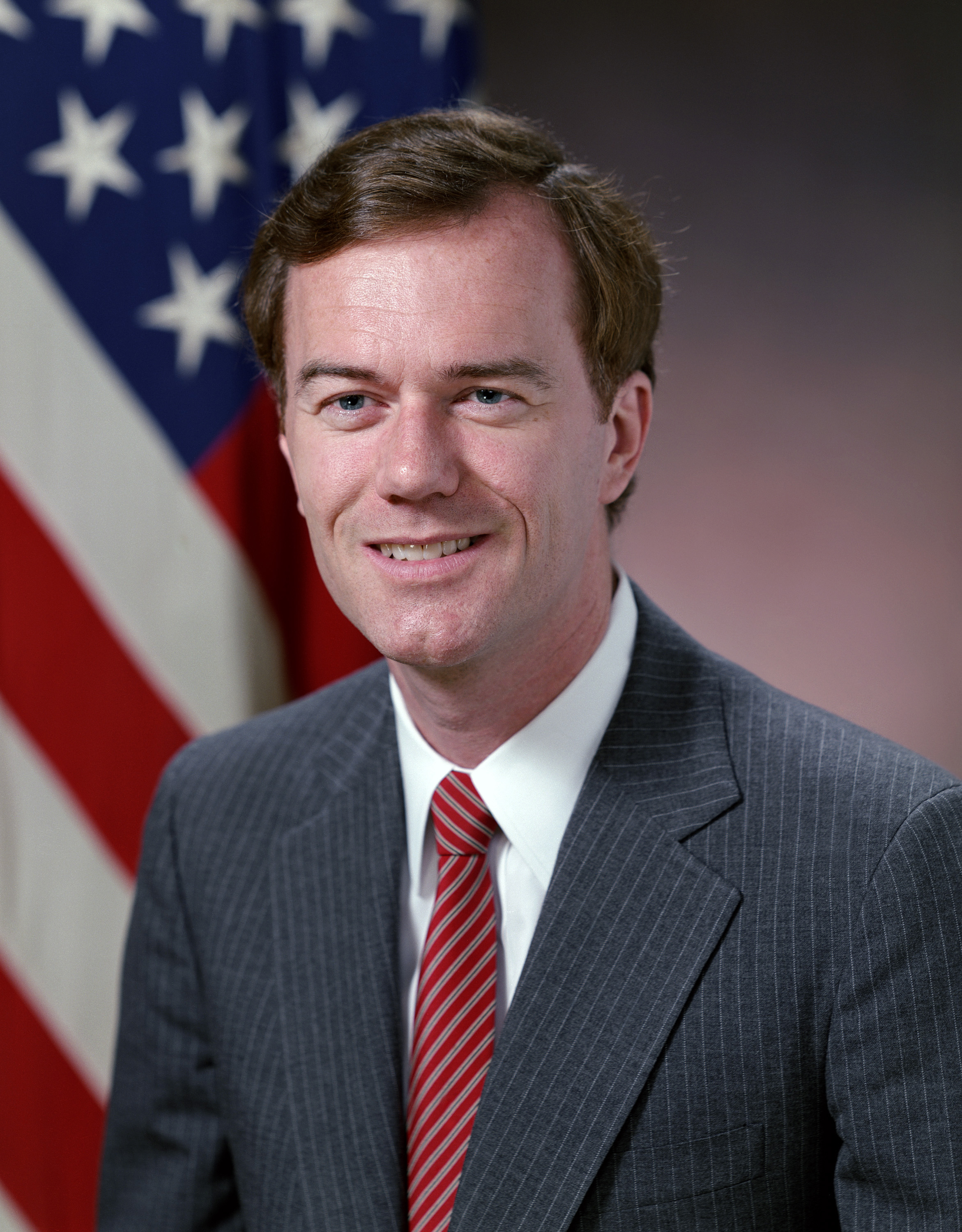
- Huffington c. 1987

Member of the U.S. House of Representatives from California's 22nd district
- In office January 3, 1993 – January 3, 1995
- Preceded by: Bob Lagomarsino (redistricted)
- Succeeded by: Andrea Seastrand

Personal details
- Born: Roy Michael Huffington Jr. September 3, 1947 (age 79) Dallas, Texas, U.S.
- Party: Republican
- Spouse: Arianna Stassinopoúlou (m. 1986; div. 1997)
- Children: 2
- Relatives: Roy M. Huffington (father)
- Education: Stanford University (BA, BS); Harvard University (MBA)

Roy Michael Huffington Jr. (born September 3, 1947) is an American businessman and retired politician. He was a member of the Republican Party, and a congressman for one term from California. He served in the U.S. House of Representatives from 1993 to 1995. Huffington was married to Arianna Huffington, the Greek-born co-founder of HuffPost, from 1986 to 1997. He is also an LGBTQ activist.

== Early years ==
Huffington was born in Dallas, Texas, to Celeste Phyllis (Gough) and Roy Michael Huffington, the founder of the natural gas exploration company, Roy M. Huffington, Inc. (HUFFCO).

In 1965, Huffington graduated from Culver Military Academy in Culver, Indiana, where he received the Central States Amateur Rowing Association Medal when he rowed on the light weight crew. After graduation, he was elected to the Culver Chapter of the Cum Laude Society. In 1970, he received a BS degree in engineering and a BA degree in economics concurrently from Stanford University. That same year, Huffington was called for his draft physical, but failed due to poor eyesight. Huffington was a member of the varsity crew, student senator, and co-president of his senior class. In 1972, he received an MBA in finance from Harvard University in Cambridge, Massachusetts.

Huffington's wealth is derived from a merchant bank he started and his share of the family's Houston oil, gas and real estate firm that was sold to Taiwanese interests in 1990. His father, Roy M. Huffington, made a fortune through natural gas interests in Indonesia.

== Politics ==
Huffington's interest in politics began in 1968, when he was a summer intern in Washington, D.C. for freshman Congressman George H. W. Bush.

=== Reagan administration ===
In 1986, President Ronald Reagan appointed Huffington as Deputy Assistant Secretary of Defense for Negotiations Policy, with responsibility for conventional arms control negotiations. He was awarded the Secretary of Defense Medal for Outstanding Public Service.

=== Congress ===
In 1992, Huffington was elected to the House of Representatives from California's 22nd District (Santa Barbara and San Luis Obispo counties). He spent a record $5.4 million on his campaign, 95% of it his own money. He spent about $3.5 million in the Republican primary, in which he defeated veteran incumbent Robert J. Lagomarsino. Huffington later defeated then-Santa Barbara County Supervisor Gloria Ochoa in the general election. He donated his entire congressional salary to the Partnership for Children of Santa Barbara County in 1993, and to the Partnership for Children of San Luis Obispo County in 1994.

=== Senate campaign ===
In 1994, Huffington did not seek re-election to the House but spent $28 million in a bid for the seat in the United States Senate held by Dianne Feinstein. She had won the seat in a special election two years earlier against John F. Seymour, who had been appointed in 1991 to fill the vacancy caused by the retirement of Governor-elect Pete Wilson. In the Republican primary, Huffington defeated William E. Dannemeyer. At the time, Huffington's campaign was the most expensive in a non-presidential election in American history. He lost to Feinstein in the general election by 1.9 percent of the vote.

=== Activism ===
During 1998, Huffington was co-chairman (with actor and director Rob Reiner) of Proposition 10 in California, which increased the state excise tax on cigarettes by 50 cents per pack. The resulting multi-hundred million dollars of tax revenue was used for prenatal care and for the health care and education of children under six years of age.

In the 2003 California gubernatorial recall election, Huffington endorsed Republican Arnold Schwarzenegger. His ex-wife, Arianna Huffington, was an opposing candidate. She withdrew before the election, although her name remained on the ballot.

On June 29, 2006, Huffington co-chaired the Log Cabin Republicans’ "The Courage To Lead: An Evening With The Governor" dinner that honored California governor Arnold Schwarzenegger. Huffington also personally contributed $1 for every $2 contributed to the Log Cabin Republicans (a 501(c)(4) tax designated organization) for that dinner.

In 2006, Huffington became the director of It's My Party Too, a group founded by former New Jersey Governor Christine Todd Whitman. A moderate Republican organization with libertarian leanings, it advocated fiscal conservatism, social progressivism, environmental protection and limited government interference in personal matters. In 2007, It's My Party Too evolved into the Republican Leadership Council.

In 2013, Huffington was a signatory to an amicus curiae brief in support of same-sex marriage, submitted to the Supreme Court during the Hollingsworth v. Perry case.

== Personal life ==
Huffington married Arianna Huffington, a Greek-born writer and lecturer, on April 12, 1986. They had two daughters and divorced in 1997. In December 2006, he became a blogger for The Huffington Post, which was co-founded by his ex-wife in 2005.

=== LGBTQ issues ===
Huffington publicly shared that he is bisexual in 1998. Since that time, Huffington has made a number of contributions to LGBTQ causes. Later that year, he provided the initial grant that launched SOIN (Sexual Orientation Issues in the News) at the University of Southern California's Annenberg School for Communication. Then in 2005, Huffington helped to establish a summer fellowship program for LGBTQ students at Stanford University. He also spoke at the National Equality March rally at the U.S. Capitol in Washington, D.C., on October 11, 2009.

=== Religion ===
Huffington was raised Presbyterian, became Episcopalian at age 38, and ultimately joined the Greek Orthodox Church during his marriage to Arianna. Between 2007 and 2021, Huffington gave $3.5 million to establish the Huffington Ecumenical Institute at Loyola Marymount University in Los Angeles, in order to promote dialogue between the Roman Catholic and Eastern Orthodox churches. Concerning the institute's mission, Huffington said, "My dream is that someday I'll get to see members of the Catholic Church and the Orthodox Church be able to take communion in each other's churches." In 2021 he contributed another $2.5 million to Hellenic College Holy Cross in Brookline, Massachusetts to establish another Huffington Ecumenical Institute.

== Film production ==
Huffington found a post-political career as a film producer. From 1991 to 2000, he was the co-owner of Crest Films Limited.

Among his other production credits:

- Huffington was a financial contributor to Out of the Past, a documentary that won the Audience Award at the Sundance Film Festival in 1998.
- Huffington executive produced three short films at the University of Southern California: "The Promise" in 1998, "Lost and Found" in 1999, and "Nuclear Family" in 2000.
- He was an executive producer of the 2000 television series, The Secret Adventures of Jules Verne.
- He was an executive producer of the 2007 AFI film Santa Croce, which was distributed worldwide on through the iTunes Store and Shorts International.
- He was an executive producer of For the Bible Tells Me So, a documentary that premiered at the 2007 Sundance Film Festival.
- He was an executive producer of A Jihad for Love, a documentary that premiered at the 2007 Toronto International Film Festival.
- He was executive producer of We're All Angels, a 2007 documentary about gay Christian pop singers Jason and deMarco, which premiered on Showtime on June 12, 2008.
- He was an executive producer of Bi the Way, a documentary about bisexuality in America that premiered at the 2008 SXSW Film Festival.
- He was an executive producer of American Primitive, which premiered at the 2009 Palm Springs International Film Festival.
- He was a producer of Father vs. Son, a comedy that premiered at WorldFest 2010 and won The Houston Film Critics Society Award for Best World Premiere – Feature Films.
- He was a producer of Dissolution, which premiered at the 2010 Jerusalem International Film Festival and won the Best Drama Award.
- He was a producer of After The Fire directed by Gudio Verweyen, inspired by the Pulitzer Prize story and New York Times bestseller After The Fire by Robin G. Fisher.
- Under the banner of his own production company Huffington Pictures, Huffington was a producer for the 2013 film Geography Club, directed by Gary Entin and based on Brent Hartinger's book of the same name.
- Huffington was an executive producer of Hold Me Down, a 2017 American drama short film about the struggles of a 19-year-old single mother in The Bronx, written and directed by Niclas Gillis.

== Electoral history ==
1994 California United States Senate election
Party	Candidate	Votes	%	±%
Democratic	Dianne Feinstein (incumbent)	3,979,152	46.7	−7.6
Republican	Michael Huffington	3,817,025	44.8	+6.8
Peace and Freedom	Elizabeth Cervantes Barron	255,301	3.0	+0.2
Libertarian	Richard Benjamin Boddie	179,100	2.1	−0.6
American Independent	Paul Meeuwenberg	142,771	1.7	−0.9
Green	Barbara Blong	140,567	1.7	+1.7
Total votes		8,513,916		
Majority		162,127	1.9	−14.4
Turnout				
Democratic hold		Swing	−14.4	

1992 United States House of Representatives elections
Party	Candidate	Votes	%
Republican	Michael Huffington	131,242	52.5
Democratic	Gloria Ochoa	87,328	34.9
Green	Mindy Lorenz	23,699	9.5
Libertarian	William Howard Dilbeck	7,553	3.0
No party	Richard Bialosky (write-in)	104	0.1
Total votes		249,926	100.0
Turnout			
Republican hold			

== See also ==
- List of LGBTQ members of the United States Congress

U.S. House of Representatives
Preceded by Carlos Moorhead	Member of the U.S. House of Representatives from California's 22nd congressional district 1993–1995	Succeeded by Andrea Seastrand
Party political offices
Preceded by John F. Seymour	Republican nominee for U.S. Senator from California (Class 1); 1994	Succeeded by Tom Campbell
U.S. order of precedence (ceremonial)
Preceded by Daniel Hamburg as Former U.S. Representative	Order of precedence of the United States as Former U.S. Representative	Succeeded by Lynn Schenk as Former U.S. Representative
