= 1990 California gubernatorial election =

- November 6, 1990
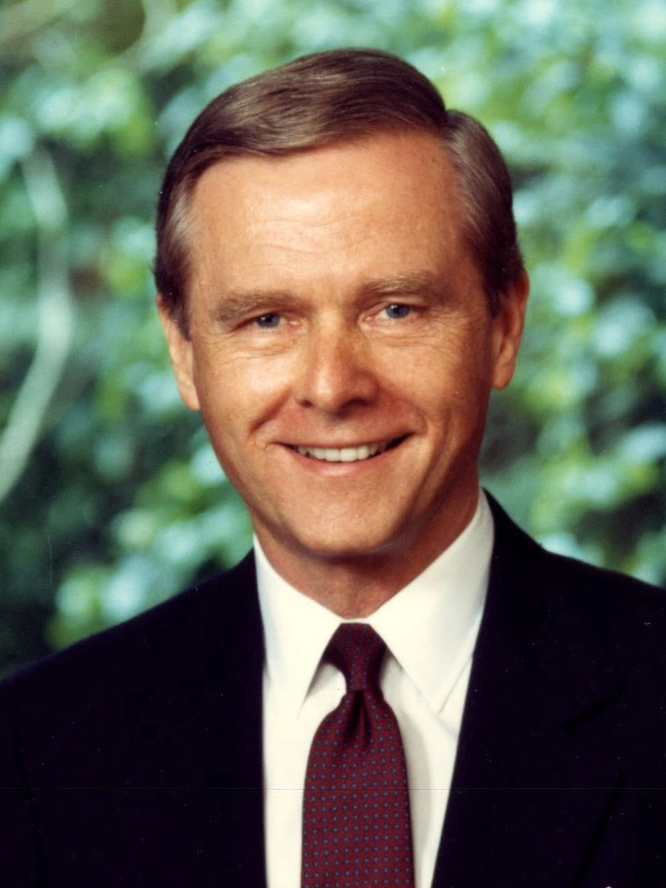

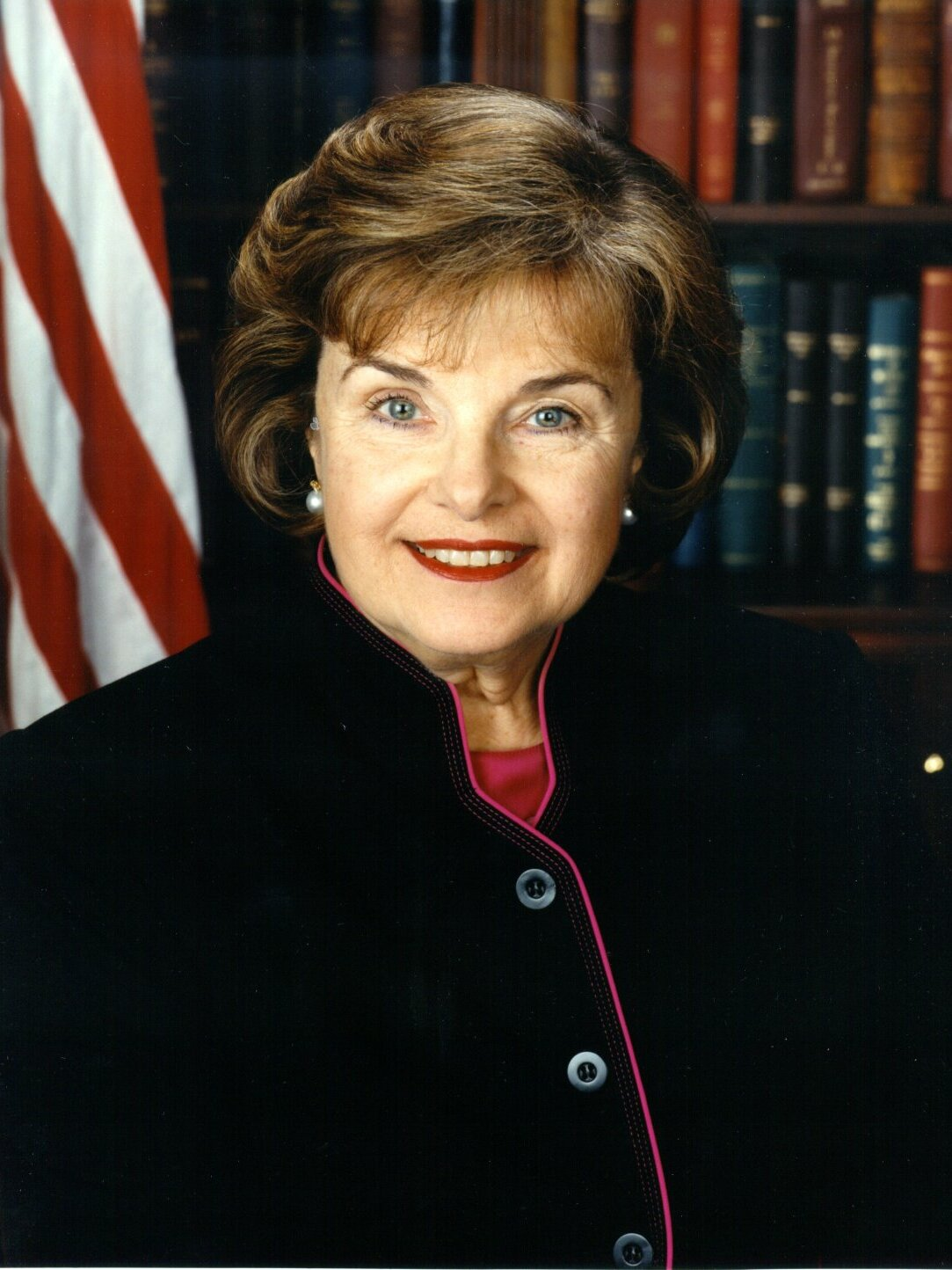
Nominee	Pete Wilson	Dianne Feinstein
Party	Republican	Democratic
Popular vote	3,791,904	3,525,197
Percentage	49.25%	45.78%
- Wilson: 40–50% 50–60% 60–70% Feinstein: 40–50% 50–60% 60–70% 70–80%
Governor before election
George Deukmejian
Republican
Elected Governor
Pete Wilson
Republican

The 1990 California gubernatorial election was held on November 6, 1990. Though incumbent Republican Governor George Deukmejian was eligible for a third term, he announced in January 1989 that he would not pursue reelection. Republicans instead nominated Senator Pete Wilson, who defeated Democratic former San Francisco Mayor Dianne Feinstein in a close race.

Feinstein won the Democratic nomination against opponents including California Attorney General John Van de Kamp, while Wilson faced minimal opposition in his bid for the Republican nomination. Feinstein was elected to Wilson's former Senate seat in 1992, and served in the Senate until her death in September 2023.

== Republican primary ==
=== Candidates ===
- Donald L. Bullock
- Jeffrey T. Greene
- David M. Williams
- Pete Wilson, incumbent U.S. senator and former mayor of San Diego

=== Results ===
Republican primary results
Party	Candidate	Votes	%
Republican	Pete Wilson	1,856,614	87.50%
Republican	David M. Williams	107,397	5.06%
Republican	Jeffrey T. Greene	79,083	3.73%
Republican	Donald L. Bullock	54,577	2.57%
Republican	William B. Allen (write-in)	24,058	1.13%
Total votes		2,121,729	100.00%

== Democratic primary ==
=== Candidates ===
- John Hancock Abbott
- Eileen Anderson
- Lydon Byrne
- Mark Calney
- Dianne Feinstein, mayor of San Francisco
- Franklin Geraty
- Charles A. Mahon III
- Charles Pineda Jr.
- Frank L. Thomas
- John van de Kamp, California attorney general
- F. Frank Wong

=== Results ===
Democratic primary results
Party	Candidate	Votes	%
Democratic	Dianne Feinstein	1,361,360	52.26%
Democratic	John Van de Kamp	1,067,899	41.00%
Democratic	Frank L. Thomas	35,900	1.38%
Democratic	Charles Pineda Jr.	25,396	0.97%
Democratic	Franklin R. Geraty	24,251	0.93%
Democratic	John Hancock Abbott	19,697	0.76%
Democratic	Charles A. Mahon III	17,987	0.69%
Democratic	F. Frank Wong	16,280	0.62%
Democratic	Eileen Anderson	16,116	0.62%
Democratic	Lydon Byrne	11,975	0.46%
Democratic	Mark Calney	7,923	0.30%
Democratic	Sue Lockard Digre (write-in)	68	0.00%
Total votes		2,604,852	100.00%

== Minor party primaries ==
=== American Independent Party ===
American Independent primary results
Party	Candidate	Votes	%
American Independent	Jerome McCready	8,921	54.12%
American Independent	Chuck Morsa	7,563	45.88%
Total votes		16,484	100.00%

=== Libertarian Party ===
Libertarian primary results
Party	Candidate	Votes	%
Libertarian	Dennis Thompson	11,857	100.00%
Total votes		11,857	100.00%

=== Peace and Freedom Party ===
Peace and Freedom primary results
Party	Candidate	Votes	%
Peace and Freedom	Maria Elizabeth Muñoz	3,461	56.66%
Peace and Freedom	Merle Woo	2,647	43.34%
Total votes		6,108	100.00%

== General election results ==
=== Candidates ===
- Dianne Feinstein, mayor of San Francisco (Democratic)
- Jerome McCready (American Independent)
- Maria Elizabeth Muñoz (Peace and Freedom)
- Dennis Thompson (Libertarian)
- Pete Wilson, U.S. Senator (Republican)

=== Results ===
1990 California gubernatorial election
Party	Candidate	Votes	%	±%
Republican	Pete Wilson	3,791,904	49.25%	−11.29%
Democratic	Dianne Feinstein	3,525,197	45.78%	+8.41%
Libertarian	Dennis Thompson	145,628	1.89%	+1.18%
American Independent	Jerome McCready	139,661	1.81%	+1.13%
Peace and Freedom	Maria Elizabeth Muñoz	96,842	1.26%	+0.56%
Independent	Joel Britton (write-in)	98	0.00%	
Independent	Charles A. Mahon III (write-in)	91	0.00%	
Independent	Franklin R. Geraty (write-in)	34	0.00%	
Independent	Jerry Irwin Solomon (write-in)	12	0.00%	
Majority		266,707	3.46%	
Total votes		7,699,467	100.00%	
Republican hold		Swing	-19.71%	

==== Results by county ====
County	Pete Wilson Republican		Dianne Feinstein Democratic		Dennis Thompson Libertarian		Jerome McCready American Independent		Maria Elizabeth Muñoz Peace & Freedom		All others Write-in		Margin		Total votes cast
County	#	%	#	%	#	%	#	%	#	%	#	%	#	%	Total votes cast
Alameda	117,107	31.64%	237,345	64.12%	6,261	1.69%	4,049	1.09%	5,405	1.46%	11 (Note: 9 for Britton, 1 for Mahon, 1 for Geraty)	0.00%	-120,238	-32.48%	370,178
Alpine	242	52.72%	174	37.91%	14	3.05%	16	3.49%	13	2.83%	0	0.00%	68	14.81%	459
Amador	6,469	53.99%	4,797	40.04%	261	2.18%	336	2.80%	118	0.98%	0	0.00%	1,672	13.96%	11,981
Butte	35,048	54.93%	25,422	39.85%	1,458	2.29%	1,264	1.98%	607	0.95%	2 (Note: 2 for Mahon)	0.00%	9,626	15.09%	63,801
Calaveras	7,071	52.99%	5,422	40.63%	391	2.93%	322	2.41%	139	1.04%	0	0.00%	1,649	12.36%	13,345
Colusa	2,798	62.37%	1,455	32.43%	93	2.07%	103	2.30%	37	0.82%	0	0.00%	1,343	29.94%	4,486
Contra Costa	119,901	43.94%	144,268	52.87%	3,703	1.36%	2,759	1.01%	2,235	0.82%	17 (Note: 4 for Britton, 11 for Mahon, 2 for Geraty)	0.01%	-24,367	-8.93%	272,883
Del Norte	3,615	53.21%	2,717	39.99%	140	2.06%	219	3.22%	103	1.52%	0	0.00%	898	13.22%	6,794
El Dorado	26,452	55.81%	18,390	38.80%	780	1.65%	1,339	2.83%	432	0.91%	3 (Note: 3 for Mahon)	0.01%	8,062	17.01%	47,396
Fresno	77,693	52.57%	63,523	42.98%	2,176	1.47%	2,772	1.88%	1,618	1.09%	0	0.00%	14,170	9.59%	147,782
Glenn	4,190	61.06%	2,182	31.80%	185	2.70%	257	3.75%	48	0.70%	0	0.00%	2,008	29.26%	6,862
Humboldt	22,943	46.81%	22,823	46.57%	951	1.94%	1,042	2.13%	1,249	2.55%	0	0.00%	120	0.24%	49,008
Imperial	9,422	52.22%	7,463	41.36%	249	1.38%	297	1.65%	613	3.40%	0	0.00%	1,959	10.86%	18,044
Inyo	4,566	62.97%	2,369	32.67%	114	1.57%	119	1.64%	83	1.14%	0	0.00%	2,197	30.30%	7,251
Kern	73,065	60.08%	41,763	34.34%	2,359	1.94%	2,857	2.35%	1,568	1.29%	1 (Note: 1 for Mahon)	0.00%	31,302	25.74%	121,613
Kings	9,771	56.09%	6,731	38.64%	225	1.29%	393	2.26%	299	1.72%	0	0.00%	3,040	17.45%	17,419
Lake	8,344	47.11%	8,475	47.85%	436	2.46%	277	1.56%	178	1.01%	0	0.00%	-131	-0.74%	17,710
Lassen	4,790	56.23%	3,152	37.00%	180	2.11%	311	3.65%	86	1.01%	0	0.00%	1,638	19.23%	8,519
Los Angeles	867,781	46.61%	911,413	48.95%	30,157	1.62%	27,931	1.50%	24,560	1.32%	51 (Note: 41 for Britton, 4 for Mahon, 2 for Geraty, 4 for Solomon)	0.00%	-43,632	-2.34%	1,861,893
Madera	11,216	56.50%	7,431	37.44%	323	1.63%	651	3.28%	229	1.15%	0	0.00%	3,785	19.07%	19,850
Marin	35,563	36.77%	57,255	59.20%	1,750	1.81%	875	0.90%	1,277	1.32%	0	0.00%	-21,692	-22.43%	96,720
Mariposa	3,336	51.88%	2,634	40.96%	146	2.27%	250	3.89%	64	1.00%	0	0.00%	702	10.92%	6,430
Mendocino	11,723	40.86%	14,515	50.60%	700	2.44%	696	2.43%	1,054	3.67%	0	0.00%	-2,792	-9.73%	28,688
Merced	17,054	50.64%	15,004	44.55%	514	1.53%	688	2.04%	419	1.24%	0	0.00%	2,050	6.09%	33,679
Modoc	2,115	57.35%	1,320	35.79%	83	2.25%	123	3.34%	47	1.27%	0	0.00%	795	21.56%	3,688
Mono	1,776	57.46%	1,124	36.36%	78	2.52%	64	2.07%	49	1.59%	0	0.00%	652	21.09%	3,091
Monterey	34,932	42.66%	42,371	51.74%	1,554	1.90%	1,810	2.21%	1,222	1.49%	4 (Note: 1 for Britton, 3 for Mahon)	0.00%	-7,439	-9.08%	81,893
Napa	18,931	47.24%	19,017	47.45%	935	2.33%	717	1.79%	473	1.18%	2 (Note: 1 for Mahon, 1 for Geraty)	0.00%	-86	-0.21%	40,075
Nevada	18,458	54.20%	13,588	39.90%	845	2.48%	818	2.40%	349	1.02%	0	0.00%	4,870	14.30%	34,058
Orange	425,025	63.72%	208,886	31.32%	13,589	2.04%	13,156	1.97%	6,367	0.95%	7 (Note: 3 for Britton, 3 for Mahon, 1 for Solomon)	0.00%	216,139	32.40%	667,030
Placer	36,397	56.53%	24,577	38.17%	1,171	1.82%	1,593	2.47%	641	1.00%	3 (Note: 1 for Britton, 2 for Geraty)	0.00%	11,820	18.36%	64,382
Plumas	4,243	51.87%	3,477	42.51%	176	2.15%	205	2.51%	78	0.95%	1 (Note: 1 for Mahon)	0.01%	766	9.36%	8,180
Riverside	157,214	57.26%	102,847	37.46%	5,064	1.84%	6,809	2.48%	2,620	0.95%	1 (Note: 1 for Mahon)	0.00%	54,367	19.80%	274,555
Sacramento	167,982	50.32%	149,215	44.70%	5,381	1.61%	7,248	2.17%	3,997	1.20%	25 (Note: 1 for Britton, 12 for Mahon, 10 for Geraty, 2 for Solomon)	0.01%	18,767	5.62%	333,848
San Benito	4,120	45.23%	4,445	48.80%	185	2.03%	171	1.88%	187	2.05%	0	0.00%	-325	-3.57%	9,108
San Bernardino	169,028	55.99%	114,764	38.02%	6,612	2.19%	7,536	2.50%	3,894	1.29%	39 (Note: 10 for Britton, 15 for Mahon, 9 for Geraty, 5 for Solomon)	0.01%	54,264	17.98%	301,873
San Diego	383,959	57.09%	244,759	36.39%	18,217	2.71%	16,963	2.52%	8,624	1.28%	15 (Note: 13 for Britton, 2 for Mahon)	0.00%	139,200	20.70%	672,537
San Francisco	56,652	25.00%	161,626	71.32%	2,938	1.30%	1,456	0.64%	3,952	1.74%	3 (Note: 2 for Britton, 1 for Geraty)	0.00%	-104,974	-46.32%	226,627
San Joaquin	62,249	54.98%	46,653	41.21%	1,488	1.31%	1,916	1.69%	904	0.80%	3 (Note: 3 for Mahon)	0.00%	15,596	13.78%	113,213
San Luis Obispo	38,909	53.54%	30,140	41.47%	1,513	2.08%	1,208	1.66%	900	1.24%	3 (Note: 2 for Britton, 1 for Mahon)	0.00%	8,769	12.07%	72,673
San Mateo	80,253	40.45%	109,963	55.43%	3,347	1.69%	2,537	1.28%	2,290	1.15%	6 (Note: 3 for Britton, 2 for Mahon, 1 for Geraty)	0.00%	-29,710	-14.98%	198,396
Santa Barbara	58,677	53.11%	46,977	42.52%	1,667	1.51%	1,403	1.27%	1,746	1.58%	4 (Note: 2 for Britton, 2 for Geraty)	0.00%	11,700	10.59%	110,474
Santa Clara	178,310	42.57%	218,843	52.24%	9,987	2.38%	6,544	1.56%	5,195	1.24%	13 (Note: 3 for Britton, 7 for Mahon, 3 for Geraty)	0.00%	-40,533	-9.68%	418,892
Santa Cruz	26,797	33.11%	48,530	59.96%	2,180	2.69%	1,694	2.09%	1,739	2.15%	1 (Note: 1 for Britton)	0.00%	-21,733	-26.85%	80,941
Shasta	28,322	57.85%	17,795	36.35%	1,195	2.44%	1,344	2.75%	305	0.62%	0	0.00%	10,527	21.50%	48,961
Sierra	813	51.04%	671	42.12%	34	2.13%	54	3.39%	21	1.32%	0	0.00%	142	8.91%	1,593
Siskiyou	8,320	52.61%	6,346	40.13%	446	2.82%	559	3.54%	142	0.90%	0	0.00%	1,974	12.48%	15,813
Solano	36,755	42.50%	44,969	52.00%	1,753	2.03%	2,020	2.34%	970	1.12%	15 (Note: 15 for Mahon)	0.02%	-8,214	-9.50%	86,482
Sonoma	54,706	38.60%	79,093	55.81%	2,982	2.10%	2,436	1.72%	2,505	1.77%	1 (Note: 1 for Britton)	0.00%	-24,387	-17.21%	141,723
Stanislaus	47,275	53.49%	37,182	42.07%	1,187	1.34%	1,980	2.24%	757	0.86%	1 (Note: 1 for Mahon)	0.00%	10,093	11.42%	88,382
Sutter	12,647	65.45%	5,796	30.00%	318	1.65%	399	2.06%	163	0.84%	0	0.00%	6,851	35.46%	19,323
Tehama	9,415	56.94%	5,915	35.77%	621	3.76%	498	3.01%	87	0.53%	0	0.00%	3,500	21.17%	16,536
Trinity	2,908	51.73%	2,250	40.02%	208	3.70%	176	3.13%	80	1.42%	0	0.00%	658	11.70%	5,622
Tulare	41,186	62.76%	21,670	33.02%	940	1.43%	1,058	1.61%	775	1.18%	0	0.00%	19,516	29.74%	65,629
Tuolumne	10,465	52.91%	8,294	41.93%	390	1.97%	464	2.35%	167	0.84%	0	0.00%	2,171	10.98%	19,780
Ventura	106,234	57.58%	68,139	36.93%	3,962	2.15%	3,770	2.04%	2,398	1.30%	2 (Note: 1 for Britton, 1 for Mahon)	0.00%	38,095	20.65%	184,505
Yolo	19,316	43.53%	22,890	51.59%	756	1.70%	772	1.74%	638	1.44%	1 (Note: 1 for Mahon)	0.00%	-3,574	-8.05%	44,373
Yuba	7,355	59.22%	4,342	34.96%	260	2.09%	337	2.71%	126	1.01%	0	0.00%	3,013	24.26%	12,420
Total	3,791,904	49.25%	3,525,197	45.78%	145,628	1.89%	139,661	1.81%	96,842	1.26%	235	0.00%	266,707	3.46%	7,699,467

==== Counties that flipped from Republican to Democratic ====
- Contra Costa
- Lake
- Los Angeles
- Marin
- Mendocino
- Monterey
- Napa
- San Benito
- San Mateo
- Santa Clara
- Santa Cruz
- Solano
- Sonoma
- Yolo

==== By congressional district ====
Pete Wilson won 25 of California's 45 congressional districts, including eight districts that were won by Democrats. Dianne Feinstein won 20 of California's 45 congressional districts, including two districts that were won by Republicans.

District	Wilson	Feinstein	Representative
1st	42.3%	51.6%	Frank Riggs (R)
2nd	56.3%	37.4%	Wally Herger (R)
3rd	49.3%	46.1%	Bob Matsui (D)
4th	48.7%	45.5%	Vic Fazio (D)
5th	26.7%	69.7%	Nancy Pelosi (D)
6th	32.0%	63.7%	Barbara Boxer (D)
7th	41.3%	54.3%	George Miller (D)
8th	29.0%	67.7%	Ron Dellums (D)
9th	37.2%	58.4%	Pete Stark (D)
10th	37.2%	57.2%	Don Edwards (D)
11th	38.2%	57.4%	Tom Lantos (D)
12th	45.2%	50.1%	Tom Campbell (R)
13th	43.7%	50.9%	Norman Mineta (D)
14th	56.6%	38.4%	John Doolittle (R)
15th	53.0%	42.3%	Gary Condit (D)
16th	39.6%	54.6%	Leon Panetta (D)
17th	59.7%	35.9%	Cal Dooley (D)
18th	48.3%	46.8%	Richard Lehman (D)
19th	52.4%	42.5%	Bob Lagomarsino (R)
20th	61.2%	33.3%	Bill Thomas (R)
21st	59.8%	35.6%	Elton Gallegly (R)
22nd	62.9%	32.7%	Carlos Moorhead (R)
23rd	41.0%	55.7%	Anthony Beilenson (D)
24th	33.7%	62.5%	Henry Waxman (D)
25th	34.5%	60.0%	Edward Roybal (D)
26th	42.4%	53.4%	Howard Berman (D)
27th	42.9%	52.8%	Mel Levine (D)
28th	27.4%	69.2%	Julian Dixon (D)
29th	22.2%	74.3%	Maxine Waters (D)
30th	46.7%	48.0%	Matthew Martinez (D)
31st	34.8%	60.6%	Mervyn Dymally (D)
32nd	50.3%	44.4%	Glenn Anderson (D)
33rd	59.4%	35.5%	David Dreier (R)
34th	47.0%	46.8%	Ed Torres (D)
35th	60.5%	33.2%	Jerry Lewis (R)
36th	48.3%	46.1%	George Brown (D)
37th	58.4%	36.5%	Al McCandless (R)
38th	57.4%	36.6%	Bob Dornan (R)
39th	66.6%	28.2%	William Dannemeyer (R)
40th	63.6%	32.0%	Christopher Cox (R)
41st	54.9%	39.5%	Bill Lowery (R)
42nd	62.0%	33.8%	Dana Rohrabacher (R)
43rd	64.0%	30.0%	Ron Packard (R)
44th	46.6%	46.1%	Duke Cunningham (R)
45th	60.5%	32.3%	Duncan Hunter (R)
