= Lorraine Day =

American author and orthopedic trauma surgeon (1937–2023)

- Born: February 24, 1937; Alton, Illinois, U.S.
- Died: November 10, 2023 (aged 86)
- Education: University of California, San Francisco, School of Medicine
- Occupations: Author and orthopedic trauma surgeon
- Spouse: William Dannemeyer
- Children: 2
- Writing career
- Subject: Alternative cancer treatment
- Website: Lorraine Day's official website

Lorraine Jeanette Day (February 24, 1937 – November 10, 2023) was an American author, orthopedic trauma surgeon and Chief of Orthopedic Surgery at San Francisco General Hospital and promoter of alternative cancer treatments.

Day first became controversial when she began advocating that patients be tested for AIDS prior to surgery. In the 2000s, she started to promote an alternative cancer treatment program, which has attracted criticism as being generally misleading and dangerous.

== Life ==
Day graduated from the University of California, San Francisco, School of Medicine in 1969 and trained in orthopedic surgery at two San Francisco hospitals. She became an associate professor and vice chairman of the Department of Orthopedics at the University of California, San Francisco, School of Medicine and Chief of Orthopedic Surgery at San Francisco General Hospital. During the mid-1980s, she received considerable media attention related to public discussions of the risks of acquiring AIDS through exposure to the blood of AIDS patients during trauma surgery. One action that she proposed was wearing the airborne protection suit that is usually worn to protect vulnerable patients from a doctor's germs. She published a book, AIDS: What the Government Isn't Telling You, wherein she states that in 1989, she retired from surgery because of the allegedly excessive risk of acquiring AIDS.

Lorraine Day was also a holocaust denier and supporter of neo-Nazi Ernst Zündel. She testified on his behalf in the matter of his health while he was detained in Canada.

Day remarried later to former California congressman William Dannemeyer. He died on July 9, 2019, at the age of 89. She died on November 10, 2023, at the age of 87.

== Alternative cancer treatment ==
As a promoter of alternative medicine, she claimed to have discovered the cause and cure of cancer, as a result of God showing her how to recover from her own cancer with a 10-step plan. According to her theory, all cancers are due to weakness of the immune system which must be cured by diet. "All diseases are caused by a combination of three factors: malnutrition, dehydration, and stress."

In 2004, she began marketing her "Cancer Doesn't Scare Me Anymore" videotape with an infomercial. Stephen Barrett of Quackwatch registered a complaint about the content of the infomercial, and subsequently reported that the video had been declared to be "misleading" by the National Advertising Division of the Council of Better Business Bureaus in December 2004.

Barrett wrote on Quackwatch, "In my opinion, her advice is untrustworthy and is particularly dangerous to people with cancer".

== See also ==
- List of ineffective cancer treatments
