= Hold Me Down (film) =

- Directed by: Niclas Gillis
- Written by: Niclas Gillis
- Produced by: Niclas Gillis
- Starring: Tianna Allen; Tanisha Lambright; Cheryl Juniaus; Prince Combs
- Cinematography: Niclas Gillis
- Edited by: Niclas Gillis
- Music by: Jonas Söderman Bohlin
- Production companies: The Collectif; More Media
- Distributed by: Bob Film Sweden
- Release date: February 2017 (Gothenburg International Film Festival)
- Running time: 28 minutes
- Countries: Sweden; United States
- Language: English

Hold Me Down is a 2017 Swedish-American drama short film written and directed by Niclas Gillis. The story is based on true events and features a cast of non-actors from the Bronx, New York; among them Tianna Allen, Tanisha Lambright, Cheryl Juniaus, and Prince Combs. The title is American slang, meaning "be there for me".

The film depicts a day in the life of a 19-year-old single mother who works as a stripper at an illegal nightclub to support her child. It is filmed on location in the South Bronx: in the Mott Haven public housing, the New York City Subway, a local Chinese take-out, and an active brothel. With a running time of 28 minutes, it sets out to explore the cyclical nature of American poverty and the conditions that push many girls and young women into prostitution. Following its world premiere at the Gothenburg International Film Festival, Hold Me Down has been lauded by critics for its authoritative realism and the outstanding performances of the cast, called "a powerful, powerful drama" by CNN.

Due to the complex nature of the production, Hold Me Down would take nearly three years to complete. Produced by The Collectif and More Media with support from IFP, the film was retroactively funded by The Swedish Film Institute and Sveriges Television (the national Swedish broadcaster) which included the film in its program "Moving Sweden". In order for the film to qualify for Swedish funding, post production was done in Stockholm with the participation of Swedish production company Bob Film Sweden, which assumed European rights to the film.

== Cast ==
- Tianna Allen as Chastity
- Syrah and Serenity Harris as Fayth
- Tanisha Lambright as Nisha
- Anaya Ba as Nana
- Prince Combs as Prince
- Cheryl Juniaus as Chastity's mother
- Alexis Williams as Lilly
- Barbara Moore as Miss Ida
- Nicole Cochran Adams as Nik
- Miranda Collier as Silence
- Shavon Thomas as Cakes
- Mike Strickland as the MC
- Ralph Carter as the bouncer

== Production ==
=== Development ===
Niclas Gillis first became aware of the issues that the film addresses when he moved to New York from his native Sweden in 2009, then 19 years of age. As one of the only white male students living on campus at the college he attended, he was invited by fellow residents to what he thought would be a regular house party in Harlem but that proved to be an illicit event similar to the one depicted in the film. After witnessing a young woman have sex with a man on the floor of a crowded room for single dollar bills, he was shocked and asked her if she was okay. She told him that she had a two-year-old daughter and that this was what she had to do to survive.

Jarred by what he witnessed and the understanding that her predicament was not unique, Gillis began to more seriously study U.S. history and its bearings on present-day socioeconomics. Upon realizing the scope of the problem - what he perceived to be gross societal inequities - and feeling that that "reality" had not been adequately documented, Gillis set out to make a film that he hoped would shed light on some of the struggles endured by women in poverty in the United States.

In January, 2014, Gillis revisited a similar event for the purpose of getting in touch with the women affected and begin the project. At a blacked-out barbershop in Queens that served as a brothel at night, Gillis met Unique Adams, a young woman then pregnant with her first child. Over the course of the next several months, Gillis and Adams met regularly to talk about her life, the struggles that she faced, and what she hoped that the film would convey. She invited Gillis to the events she worked and taped dressing room conversations for him to study. Throughout the process of writing, Gillis would read aloud for Adams to confirm the authenticity of the depiction.

=== Pre-Production ===
When the screenplay was completed, Adams introduced Gillis to Prince Combs, a Bronx resident familiar to the "after-hours" circuit. Impressed by the authenticity of the screenplay and what he perceived to be an important subject, Combs came on board as Associate Producer in the summer of 2014 and would remain Gillis' closest collaborator for the next several years. Feeling that it would be important that each role be played by women who had real-life experience of the struggles depicted, Gillis, Combs and friends handed out 10,000 flyers in the streets of the Bronx, and put up hundreds of posters in the public housing projects in the area, advertising the castings. In Combs' studio, the two interviewed hundreds of women survivors of sexual abuse, violence, and prostitution. Over the course of nine months, the cast was assembled through the process of auditions, callbacks, screen tests, and rehearsals.

=== Funding ===
To go into production, Gillis raised 70,000 dollars through private sponsors (Michael Huffington, Jacqueline Gill, and Ruth and Hans Blixt), and 30,000 dollars via Kickstarter together with co-EP Lucy Bidwell, in addition to the 47,000 dollars that he personally borrowed and the 30,000 dollars that More Media lent to the production on the hope that the film would eventually be picked up by The Swedish Film Institute. Five months after filming, in January 2016, the institute together with Sveriges Television finally approved their application, including Hold Me Down in the 3% of films awarded the "Moving Sweden" grant. Post production was thus relocated to Sweden, where Gillis completed the film with the participation of Bob Film Sweden.

=== Filming ===
Hold Me Down was shot entirely on location in the South Bronx: in the Mott Haven housing projects, in a local Chinese restaurant, on the New York subway, and in an actual brothel. It was filmed on a RED Epic Dragon with anamorphic lenses from Panavision by DP Steve Annis, line produced by Joshua Martinez, over the course of six days. Gillis has described his approach to directing actors as being influenced by Elia Kazan and John Cassavetes, providing the actors with psychological instigators (rather than requesting specific expressions) that achieve more lifelike performances.

=== Post Production ===
Post production was done in Sweden throughout 2016. The score was composed by Jonas Söderman Bohlin and performed by renowned cellist Kati Raitinen. Sound design was done by Aleksander Karshikoff at Across the Alley and the grade by Ola Bäccman. Visual cleanup was done by William and Sebastian Rosso. The film was edited by Niclas Gillis. Before the end credits begin, it reads "To Unique".

== Release ==
=== Reception ===
Following its world premiere at the Gothenburg International Film Festival, Hold Me Down has been universally lauded by critics, called "a powerful, powerful drama" by CNN. “Hands down near the very top of the list of the best films I've seen in 2018 and many other years as well”, Unseen Films; “I’ve seen a lot of short films in my 37 years, and I’m finding it difficult to recall one that was more emotionally affecting than Hold Me Down", Cultured Vulture; “Raw and teeming with social dialogue, Hold Me Down is a powerhouse short film that takes a sledgehammer to gender roles whilst never loosening its grip on the audience’s collar”, UK Film Review. Hold Me Down won the award for Best Short Film at Harlem International Film Festival, played on Sveriges Television (the national Swedish broadcaster), as well as SVT Play, and became a Vimeo Staff Pick following its online release in 2018.
