= 1992 United States Senate special election in California =

- November 3, 1992
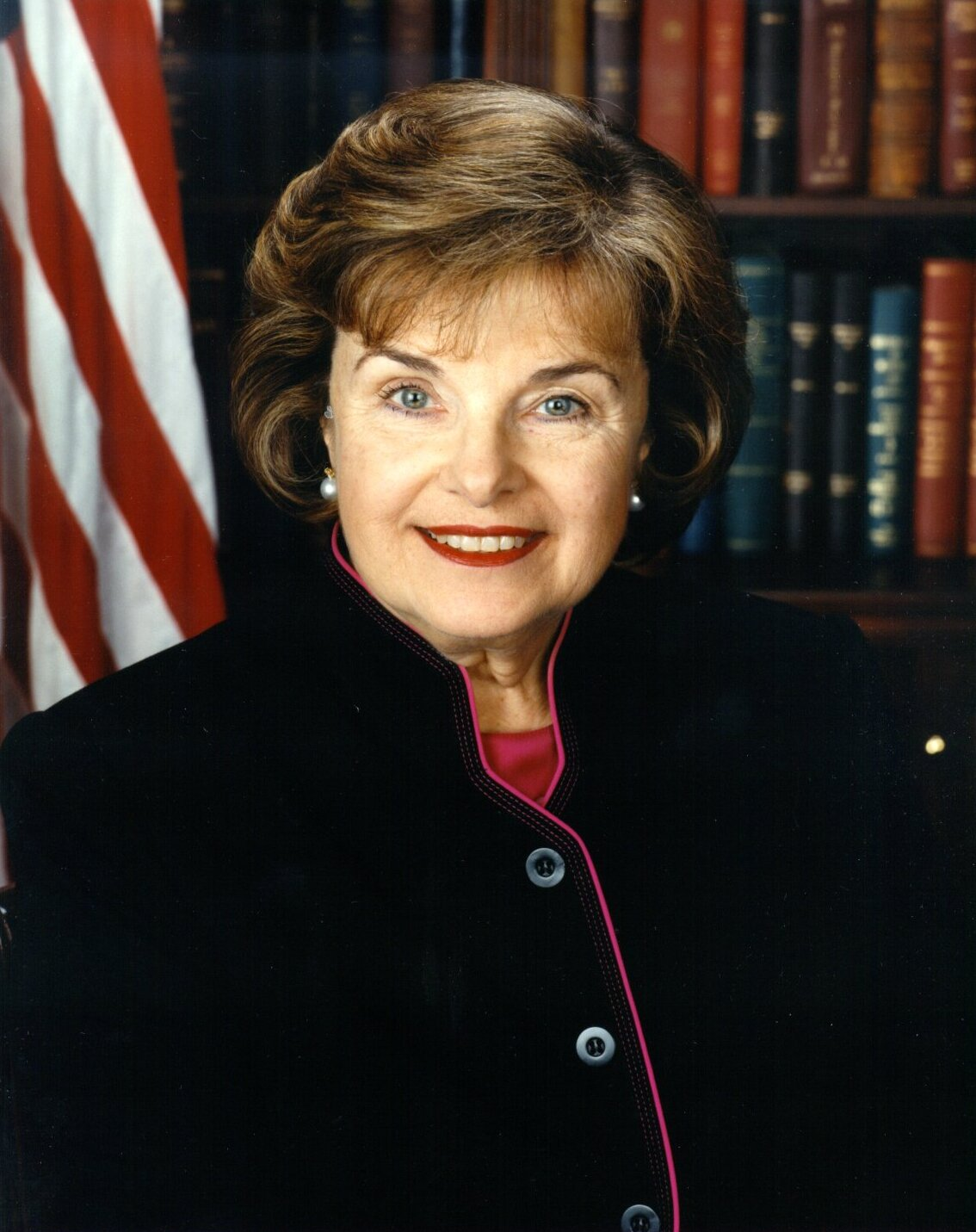

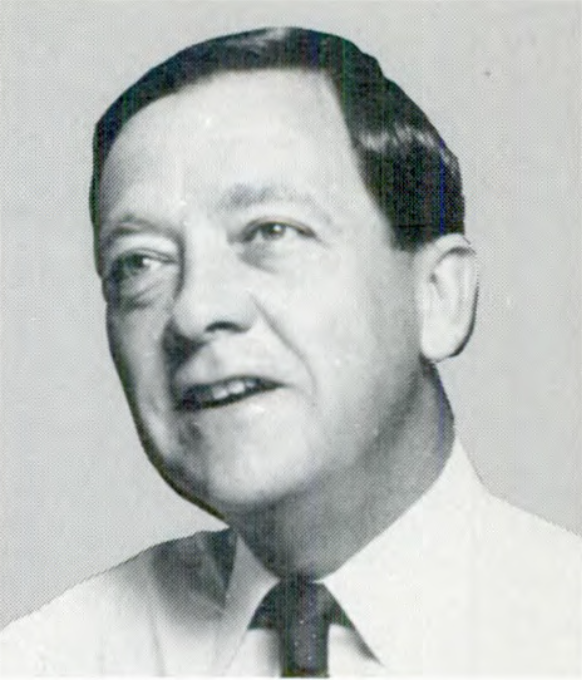
Nominee	Dianne Feinstein	John Seymour
Party	Democratic	Republican
Popular vote	5,853,651	4,093,501
Percentage	54.29%	37.96%
- Feinstein: 40–50% 50–60% 60–70% 70–80% Seymour: 40–50% 50–60%
U.S. senator before election
John Seymour
Republican
Elected U.S. Senator
Dianne Feinstein
Democratic

The 1992 United States Senate special election in California took place on November 3, 1992, at the same time as the regular election to the United States Senate in California. Dianne Feinstein defeated future California governor Gray Davis in the Democratic primary, while John Seymour defeated William E. Dannemeyer in the Republican primary.

In this special election to complete the unexpired term of Republican Pete Wilson, who resigned to become Governor of California, incumbent Republican Senator John Seymour was defeated by former San Francisco Mayor Dianne Feinstein, whom Wilson defeated in the 1990 gubernatorial election. Feinstein subsequently held seniority over fellow Democrat Barbara Boxer, who was elected on the same day; because Feinstein was elected to complete an unexpired term, she took office on November 4, only 1 day after the election, while Boxer's term commenced with the beginning of the next session of Congress in January 1993. These elections marked the first time in history that two women simultaneously served in the Senate from the same state.

Since Seymour's death in April 2026, this is the most recent U.S. Senate election in California and latest U.S. Senate election of any state in the nation where both major party Senate nominees are deceased.

== Background ==
The seat became vacant after incumbent Republican U.S. Senator Pete Wilson won the 1990 gubernatorial election, defeating Democrat Dianne Feinstein. Wilson appointed John Seymour to the Senate to replace himself.

== Democratic primary ==
=== Candidates ===
- Joseph Alioto Jr., attorney and son of former San Francisco mayor Joseph Alioto
- Gray Davis, California state controller
- Dianne Feinstein, former mayor of San Francisco (1978–88) and 1990 nominee for governor
- David Kearns

=== Results ===
1992 Democratic special U.S. Senate primary
Party	Candidate	Votes	%
Democratic	Dianne Feinstein	1,775,124	54.74%
Democratic	Gray Davis	1,009,761	32.85%
Democratic	David Kearns	149,918	4.88%
Democratic	Joseph Alioto	139,410	4.54%
Total votes		3,074,213	100.00%

== Republican primary ==
=== Candidates ===
- William B. Allen, former chair of the United States Commission on Civil Rights, 1986 candidate for Senate, and 1990 candidate for governor
- William E. Dannemeyer, U.S. representative from Fullerton
- John Seymour, incumbent U.S. senator since January 1991 (appointed by Pete Wilson)
- Jim Trinity, retired Glendale dentist

=== Results ===
1992 Republican special U.S. Senate primary
Party	Candidate	Votes	%
Republican	John Seymour (incumbent)	1,216,096	51.17%
Republican	William E. Dannemeyer	638,279	26.86%
Republican	Jim Trinity	306,182	12.88%
Republican	William B. Allen	216,177	9.10%
Total votes		2,376,734	100.00

== General election ==
=== Candidates ===
- Richard Benjamin Boddie (Libertarian)
- Dianne Feinstein, former mayor of San Francisco (1978–88) and 1990 nominee for governor (Democratic)
- Gerald Horne, professor of history at the University of California, Santa Barbara (Peace and Freedom)
- Paul Meeuwenberg (American Independent)
- John Seymour, incumbent U.S. senator since January 1991 (Republican)

=== Results ===
1992 United States Senate special election in California
Party	Candidate	Votes	%
Democratic	Dianne Feinstein	5,853,651	54.29%
Republican	John Seymour (incumbent)	4,093,501	37.96%
Peace and Freedom	Gerald Horne	305,697	2.84%
American Independent	Paul Meeuwenberg	281,973	2.62%
Libertarian	Richard Benjamin Boddie	247,799	2.30%
No party	Write-ins	122	0.00
Invalid or blank votes		591,822	5.20%
Total votes		11,374,565	100.00%
Turnout			54.52
Democratic gain from Republican			

==== By county ====
County	Feinstein		Seymour		Horne		Meeuwenberg		Boddie		Write-in	
County	share	votes	share	votes	share	votes	share	votes	share	votes	share	votes
Alameda	72.56%	374,675	21.93%	113,223	2.30%	11,866	1.61%	8,323	1.60%	8,257	0.00%	23
Alpine	47.91%	287	42.07%	252	3.01%	18	4.51%	27	2.50%	15	0.00%	0
Amador	48.29%	7,319	42.64%	6,463	2.40%	364	4.07%	617	2.60%	394	0.00%	0
Butte	44.72%	37,396	45.57%	38,111	2.96%	2,477	3.56%	2,980	3.19%	2,666	0.00%	0
Calaveras	46.64%	7,839	42.00%	7,059	2.32%	390	5.38%	905	3.65%	614	0.00%	0
Colusa	37.58%	2,083	54.37%	3,014	2.53%	140	3.18%	176	2.35%	130	0.00%	0
Contra Costa	62.96%	229,988	31.62%	115,507	1.92%	7,011	1.77%	6,470	1.73%	6,320	0.00%	2
Del Norte	50.92%	4,696	39.66%	3,658	2.56%	236	4.98%	459	1.89%	174	0.00%	0
El Dorado	45.34%	28,957	45.56%	29,101	2.37%	1,512	3.80%	2,427	2.93%	1,873	0.00%	0
Fresno	45.07%	94,988	48.48%	102,172	2.32%	4,888	2.25%	4,740	1.88%	3,959	0.00%	4
Glenn	33.10%	2,864	56.73%	4,908	2.51%	217	4.81%	416	2.85%	247	0.00%	0
Humboldt	59.81%	35,178	33.18%	19,513	2.99%	1,756	2.13%	1,253	1.90%	1,117	0.00%	0
Imperial	48.77%	12,433	43.42%	11,070	3.77%	962	2.55%	651	1.48%	378	0.00%	0
Inyo	37.41%	3,067	52.66%	4,318	2.68%	220	4.34%	356	2.90%	238	0.00%	0
Kern	36.31%	63,661	54.46%	95,483	3.22%	5,640	3.59%	6,289	2.43%	4,258	0.00%	3
Kings	40.70%	9,805	50.29%	12,115	3.74%	901	3.57%	860	1.70%	410	0.00%	0
Lake	55.10%	12,732	35.04%	8,096	3.12%	721	3.96%	916	2.77%	641	0.00%	0
Lassen	40.39%	4,005	47.64%	4,724	3.29%	326	5.59%	554	3.10%	307	0.00%	0
Los Angeles	58.72%	1,552,223	34.03%	899,656	3.18%	84,093	2.09%	55,380	1.97%	52,123	0.00%	20
Madera	39.79%	11,682	52.14%	15,309	2.94%	862	3.63%	1,066	1.50%	441	0.00%	0
Marin	71.26%	92,205	24.61%	31,846	1.45%	1,880	0.88%	1,142	1.80%	2,328	0.00%	0
Mariposa	45.38%	3,681	43.98%	3,568	3.09%	251	5.07%	411	2.48%	201	0.00%	0
Mendocino	60.59%	22,000	30.28%	10,993	3.55%	1,290	2.86%	1,039	2.72%	988	0.00%	0
Merced	47.61%	22,010	43.79%	20,246	2.79%	1,289	2.95%	1,365	2.86%	1,323	0.00%	0
Modoc	35.77%	1,572	52.95%	2,327	3.00%	132	5.21%	229	3.07%	135	0.00%	0
Mono	45.11%	1,931	44.64%	1,911	2.83%	121	3.95%	169	3.48%	149	0.00%	0
Monterey	58.89%	66,417	34.74%	39,182	2.10%	2,369	2.30%	2,590	1.96%	2,216	0.00%	0
Napa	57.01%	29,875	35.38%	18,539	2.46%	1,288	2.93%	1,537	2.22%	1,161	0.00%	0
Nevada	46.04%	20,044	44.73%	19,476	2.90%	1,261	3.32%	1,444	3.02%	1,313	0.00%	0
Orange	39.87%	377,170	50.93%	481,810	2.86%	27,056	3.42%	32,316	2.93%	27,729	0.00%	0
Placer	45.75%	40,511	45.73%	40,497	2.38%	2,109	3.30%	2,920	2.84%	2,518	0.00%	0
Plumas	46.44%	4,647	43.64%	4,367	2.30%	230	4.53%	453	3.10%	310	0.00%	0
Riverside	44.56%	187,548	45.44%	191,258	3.52%	14,808	3.95%	16,632	2.54%	10,689	0.00%	0
Sacramento	53.77%	237,722	38.07%	168,318	2.99%	13,228	2.88%	12,716	2.29%	10,113	0.00%	1
San Benito	55.51%	6,938	37.10%	4,637	2.34%	293	2.88%	360	2.16%	270	0.00%	0
San Bernardino	44.35%	200,979	45.67%	206,969	3.64%	16,511	3.71%	16,804	2.61%	11,825	0.01%	48
San Diego	46.97%	442,855	43.63%	411,362	3.21%	30,287	3.09%	29,149	3.10%	29,212	0.00%	3
San Francisco	80.60%	250,972	15.79%	49,165	1.63%	5,062	0.62%	1,919	1.36%	4,233	0.00%	10
San Joaquin	48.90%	76,607	43.11%	67,531	2.78%	4,360	3.27%	5,123	1.94%	3,043	0.00%	1
San L. Obispo	47.47%	48,376	43.94%	44,775	2.54%	2,587	3.08%	3,134	2.97%	3,030	0.00%	0
San Mateo	67.25%	181,990	27.89%	75,470	1.84%	4,983	1.29%	3,478	1.73%	4,684	0.00%	0
Santa Barbara	49.63%	77,900	42.71%	67,043	3.43%	5,386	2.25%	3,535	1.98%	3,101	0.00%	0
Santa Clara	62.19%	364,997	30.98%	181,858	2.15%	12,646	2.20%	12,912	2.47%	14,518	0.00%	2
Santa Cruz	67.88%	76,327	25.40%	28,562	2.49%	2,801	1.84%	2,072	2.39%	2,686	0.00%	1
Shasta	37.81%	25,111	51.48%	34,192	2.90%	1,928	4.62%	3,070	3.19%	2,116	0.00%	0
Sierra	45.12%	818	44.57%	808	2.48%	45	3.47%	63	4.36%	79	0.00%	0
Siskiyou	44.35%	8,963	45.42%	9,180	2.34%	473	5.16%	1,043	2.73%	551	0.00%	0
Solano	59.83%	77,739	32.30%	41,970	2.75%	3,571	2.84%	3,696	2.28%	2,960	0.00%	0
Sonoma	62.84%	121,471	29.38%	56,793	3.02%	5,846	2.43%	4,702	2.33%	4,502	0.00%	0
Stanislaus	50.11%	62,110	41.59%	51,549	2.84%	3,519	3.49%	4,325	1.98%	2,450	0.00%	0
Sutter	36.43%	9,135	53.54%	13,427	2.38%	596	5.24%	1,313	2.42%	606	0.00%	0
Tehama	39.31%	8,253	48.19%	10,116	2.99%	627	5.43%	1,140	4.08%	856	0.00%	0
Trinity	42.41%	2,743	43.66%	2,824	3.80%	246	6.29%	407	3.83%	248	0.00%	0
Tulare	35.71%	30,665	56.46%	48,493	2.72%	2,332	3.11%	2,674	2.00%	1,720	0.00%	0
Tuolumne	50.56%	11,895	40.59%	9,550	2.90%	682	3.40%	801	2.54%	597	0.01%	2
Ventura	45.30%	119,366	46.32%	122,064	2.72%	7,167	3.04%	8,019	2.61%	6,882	0.00%	1
Yolo	61.68%	37,340	31.70%	19,191	2.18%	1,319	2.27%	1,376	2.17%	1,311	0.00%	1
Yuba	40.76%	6,890	46.63%	7,882	3.07%	518	6.09%	1,030	3.45%	584	0.00%	0

Counties that flipped from Republican to Democratic

- Amador
- Alpine
- Contra Costa
- Imperial
- Calaveras
- Los Angeles
- San Benito
- Monterey
- Napa
- Nevada
- Mariposa
- San Luis Obispo
- Lake
- Tuolumne
- Merced
- Placer
- Santa Barbara
- Sacramento
- San Diego
- San Joaquin
- Stanislaus
- Mono
- Plumas
- Sierra

== See also ==
- 1992 United States Senate elections
- 1992 United States Senate election in California
