= John Seymour (California politician) =

American politician (1937–2026)

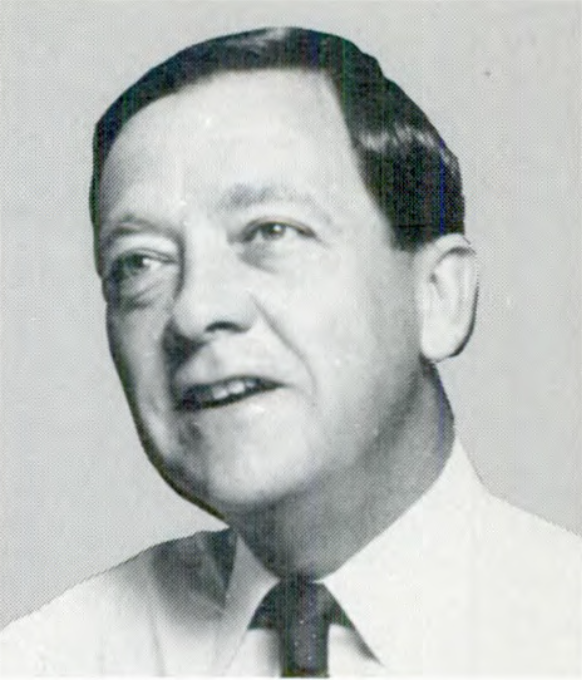

United States Senator from California
- In office January 10, 1991 – November 4, 1992
- Appointed by: Pete Wilson
- Preceded by: Pete Wilson
- Succeeded by: Dianne Feinstein

Member of the California State Senate from the 35th district
- In office April 26, 1982 – January 7, 1991
- Preceded by: John Briggs
- Succeeded by: John Lewis

39th Mayor of Anaheim
- In office April 18, 1978 – April 20, 1982
- Preceded by: Bill Thom
- Succeeded by: Don Roth

Personal details
- Born: John Francis Seymour Jr. December 3, 1937 Chicago, Illinois, U.S.
- Died: April 18, 2026 (aged 88) Carlsbad, California, U.S.
- Party: Republican
- Spouse: Judy Seymour
- Children: 6
- Education: University of California, Los Angeles (BA)

Military service
- Allegiance: United States
- Branch: United States Marine Corps
- Service years: 1955–1959
- Seymour's voice Seymour commemorating National Hispanic Heritage Month. Recorded September 16, 1992

John Francis Seymour Jr. (December 3, 1937 – April 18, 2026) was an American politician who served as a United States senator from California from 1991 to 1992. A member of the Republican Party, he was appointed to continue Pete Wilson's term but lost the special election to finish it to Democratic nominee and former San Francisco mayor Dianne Feinstein. Seymour also served in the California State Senate and as mayor of Anaheim.

== Early life and career ==
Born in Chicago, Seymour attended public schools in Mt. Lebanon, Pennsylvania. He served in the United States Marine Corps from 1955 to 1959 and graduated from the University of California, Los Angeles in 1962. Seymour was the president of the California Association of Realtors from 1978 to 1982, and worked in the real estate business from 1962 to 1981.

== Political career ==
Seymour served Anaheim as a member of its city council from 1974 to 1978, as the 39th mayor of Anaheim from 1978 to 1982, and as a state senator from 1982 to 1991. In the California Senate, his voting record was that of a moderate or liberal Republican; he voted to ban assault weapons, to outlaw discrimination against people with AIDS, and to increase spending for social programs including education and mental health benefits. As mayor of Anaheim, Seymour was instrumental in recruiting the Los Angeles Rams to move to Anaheim Stadium.

In 1991, Seymour was appointed to the U.S. Senate by Governor Pete Wilson to serve in the seat Wilson had vacated to become governor. Seymour's appointment lasted until the 1992 special election to select a replacement who would serve until the normal expiration of Wilson's term in 1995. Former San Francisco mayor Dianne Feinstein defeated Seymour in the special election. He was the last U.S. senator from Southern California until Alex Padilla took office on January 20, 2021, replacing Kamala Harris when she was inaugurated as vice president of the United States. As of 2026, Seymour was the last Republican to serve as a U.S. senator from California.

== Post-political career ==
After his Senate term, Seymour was director of the California Housing Finance Agency for two years, and later was CEO of the nonprofit Southern California Housing Development Corporation and on the boards of directors of several housing-related companies including IndyMac Bank, Orange Coast Title Insurance, Los Angeles Federal Savings Bank, and Irvine Apartment Communities.

Seymour died at home in Carlsbad, California, on April 18, 2026, at the age of 88, having suffered from Alzheimer's disease.

== See also ==
- List of mayors of Anaheim, California
- List of United States senators from California

U.S. Senate
Preceded by Pete Wilson	U.S. Senator (Class 1) from California; 1991–1992; Served alongside: Alan Cranston	Succeeded by Dianne Feinstein
Party political offices
Preceded by Pete Wilson	Republican nominee for U.S. Senator from California (Class 1); 1992	Succeeded by Michael Huffington
