= William Dannemeyer =

American politician (1929–2019)

Bill Dannemeyer
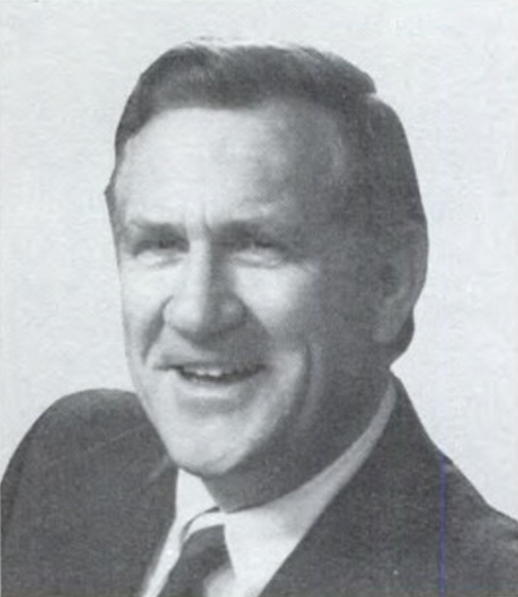

Member of the U.S. House of Representatives from California's 39th district
- In office January 3, 1979 – January 3, 1993
- Preceded by: Charles E. Wiggins
- Succeeded by: Ed Royce

Member of the California State Assembly from the 69th district
- In office January 7, 1963 – January 2, 1967
- Preceded by: Carley V. Porter
- Succeeded by: Ken Cory
- In office December 6, 1976 – November 30, 1978
- Preceded by: John Briggs
- Succeeded by: Ross Johnson

Personal details
- Born: William Edwin Dannemeyer; September 22, 1929 Long Beach, California, U.S.
- Died: July 9, 2019 (aged 89) Thousand Palms, California, U.S.
- Party: Democratic (before 1968); Republican (1968–2019)
- Spouses: Evelyn (m. 1955; died 1999); Lorraine Day (m. 2004)
- Children: 3
- Education: Allan Hancock College (attended); Valparaiso University (BA); University of California, Hastings (JD)

Military service
- Branch/service: United States Army
- Battles/wars: Korean War

William Edwin Dannemeyer (September 22, 1929 – July 9, 2019) was a conservative American politician, activist, and author, known for his opposition to LGBT rights. He served seven terms as U.S. Representative from the 39th Congressional District of California from 1979 to 1993.

Dannemeyer was opposed to gay rights, and promoted antisemitic conspiracy theories. After leaving office, Dannemeyer expressed extreme antisemitic views, including a claim that Jews were guilty of a plot to legalize the murder of American Christians, as part of a larger conspiracy to establish a New World Order.

== Early life ==
Dannemeyer was born in Long Beach, California, to German immigrants, Charlotte Ernestine (Knapp) and Henry William Dannemeyer. He attended Trinity Lutheran School in Los Angeles and Long Beach Poly High School. An Eagle Scout, Dannemeyer received the Distinguished Eagle Scout Award from the Boy Scouts of America. He entered Santa Maria Junior College in 1947 before transferring to Valparaiso University in Valparaiso, Indiana. He graduated from "Valpo" in 1950 and earned a J.D. at Hastings College of the Law of the University of California in 1952.

=== Korean War ===
From 1952 to 1954 he served in the United States Army in the Counter Intelligence Corps during and after the Korean War.

== Early career ==
Dannemeyer began practicing law in Santa Barbara in 1955, serving concurrently as a Santa Barbara County deputy district attorney. He moved to Fullerton in 1959 to become the assistant city attorney. He was elected originally as a Democrat to the California State Assembly in 1962 and was re-elected in 1964 when he was also a member of the Electoral College, casting his vote for Lyndon Johnson in the 1964 United States presidential election.

Instead of seeking re-election to the Assembly in 1966, he made a failed bid for a seat in the California State Senate. He then became a judge pro tempore of the municipal and superior courts from 1966–1976. In 1968, he appeared on a television show hosted by fellow future Congressman Bob Dornan to announce that he was leaving the Democratic Party to become a Republican. He would win election to the Assembly for a final term in 1976 as a Republican.

== Congress ==
In November 1978, Dannemeyer was elected as a Republican to the United States House of Representatives, and returned for six additional terms. He accumulated a strongly conservative record on the Budget, Judiciary, and Energy and Commerce Committees, supporting legislation to suppress illegal immigration, restrict telephone sex lines, and criminalize flag desecration.

He attempted to block federal funding of evolution-related exhibits at the Smithsonian Institution in 1982, and pushed for easing the separation of church and state. On fiscal issues, he advocated budget cuts for social programs, renegotiation of the national debt, tax reduction, and deregulation. He was the lead Republican sponsor of the 1985 deregulation of natural gas prices. In 1989, he was one of the successful House managers in the impeachment trial of then-Judge Walter Nixon for committing perjury in front of a grand jury. In 1990 he was one of twenty representatives to vote against the Americans with Disabilities Act.

Dannemeyer was an outspoken critic of LGBT rights, and on June 29, 1989, read a graphic description of gay sex into the Congressional Record titled "What Homosexuals Do". In this statement, Dannemeyer said:

... activities peculiar to homosexuality include: Rimming, or one man using his tongue to lick the rectum of another man; golden showers, having one man or men urinate on another man or men; fisting or handballing, which has one man insert his hand and/or part of his arm into another man's rectum; and using what are euphemistically termed "toys" such as one man inserting dildoes, certain vegetables, or lightbulbs up another man's rectum. Although not responsible for the original attribution, but many times on the floor of the U.S. Congress, he was fond of saying, "God's plan for man is Adam and Eve, not Adam and Steve."

He gained national notoriety with his proposals to contain the spread of AIDS during the 1980s, such as banning HIV-positive immigrants. He was the only prominent politician to support the LaRouche movement's Proposition 64 in 1986. Another California ballot initiative he backed, Proposition 102, would have mandated widespread testing, tracing of sexual partners by state authorities, and a mandatory quarantine of persons with AIDS. It failed by a considerable margin. He did succeed in pushing hospitals to notify post-1977 recipients of blood transfusions that they were at risk. In 1989 he published Shadow in the Land: Homosexuality in America, attacking the gay rights movement. In 1985, Dannemeyer advocated barring persons with AIDS from working in the healthcare industry, stating that there was already "a requirement that nurses who are AIDS victims not work in maternity [wards] because a person with AIDS emits a spore that has been known to cause birth defects." That stated, by 1994, he was open to the AIDS dissent movement and the views of UC Berkeley Professor Peter Duesberg and called for a full-scale Congressional investigation into the HIV = AIDS hypothesis.

In 1992, Dannemeyer did not run for reelection to the United States House of Representatives. Instead, he ran for the Republican nomination for U.S. Senator, but lost to fellow Orange County Republican John F. Seymour.

== Post-Congressional activities ==
In 1994, Dannemeyer ran for the Republican nomination for U.S. Senator, but lost to Michael Huffington. After leaving public office, he remained a harsh critic of the Clinton administration. During his 1994 campaign for the Senate, Dannemeyer was an early proponent of the Clinton body count conspiracy theory, and sent an alleged list of victims to congressional leadership.

In September 2006, Dannemeyer sent a letter to the California Attorney General and other officials arguing that Laci Peterson had been killed by members of a Satanic cult, not by Scott Peterson.

== Antisemitic views ==
Dannemeyer expressed strongly antisemitic views. On his website, Dannemeyer claimed that it was legal to kill Christians in the United States as part of a Jewish plot to control the world. He wrote, "The main goal of the Zionist Jews and their New World Order is exactly the same as it was when Jesus was on earth – to exterminate Christ – and His followers!" He claimed that Congress passed such a law under the guise of honoring a prominent Hasidic rabbi while he was in office. Dannemeyer's son Bruce insisted that his father was not an anti-Semite, as the anti-Jewish sentiments in question were the result of the influence of his father's second wife, Lorraine Day, a known Holocaust denier. Bruce Dannemeyer commented, "He had to agree with it or there would have been hell to pay in the household." The younger Dannemeyer also stated that his father's views on homosexuality originated in his religious upbringing, stating, "He had a great heart and love for people. He said some things that offended a great number of people, but he would not back down from a fight."

== Personal life ==
William and Evelyn Dannemeyer married in August 1955 and had three children. Evelyn died of cancer on July 31, 1999. Dannemeyer married Lorraine Day in 2004.

== Death ==
Dannemeyer died on July 9, 2019, at the age of 89 in Thousand Palms, California. He had dementia in his later years.

== Electoral history ==
1978 United States House of Representatives elections in California
| Party | Candidate | Votes | % |
|---|---|---|---|
| Republican | William E. Dannemeyer | 112,160 | 63.7 |
| Democratic | William E. Farris | 63,891 | 36.3 |
| Total votes | | 176,051 | 100.0 |
| Republican hold | | | |

1980 United States House of Representatives elections in California
| Party | Candidate | Votes | % |
|---|---|---|---|
| Republican | William E. Dannemeyer (Incumbent) | 175,228 | 76.3 |
| Democratic | Leonard L. Lahtinen | 54,504 | 23.7 |
| Total votes | | 229,732 | 100.0 |
| Republican hold | | | |

1982 United States House of Representatives elections in California
| Party | Candidate | Votes | % |
|---|---|---|---|
| Republican | William E. Dannemeyer (Incumbent) | 129,539 | 72.2 |
| Democratic | Frank G. Verges | 46,681 | 26.0 |
| Libertarian | Frank Boeheim | 3,152 | 1.8 |
| Total votes | | 179,372 | 100.0 |
| Republican hold | | | |

1984 United States House of Representatives elections in California
| Party | Candidate | Votes | % |
|---|---|---|---|
| Republican | William E. Dannemeyer (Incumbent) | 175,788 | 76.2 |
| Democratic | Robert E. Ward | 54,889 | 23.8 |
| Total votes | | 230,677 | 100.0 |
| Republican hold | | | |

1986 United States House of Representatives elections in California
| Party | Candidate | Votes | % |
|---|---|---|---|
| Republican | William E. Dannemeyer (Incumbent) | 131,603 | 74.4 |
| Democratic | David D. Vest | 42,377 | 24.0 |
| Peace and Freedom | Frank Boeheim | 2,752 | 1.6 |
| Total votes | | 176,732 | 100.0 |
| Republican hold | | | |

1988 United States House of Representatives elections in California
| Party | Candidate | Votes | % |
|---|---|---|---|
| Republican | William E. Dannemeyer (Incumbent) | 169,360 | 74.0 |
| Democratic | Don E. Marquis | 52,162 | 22.7 |
| Libertarian | Lee Connelly | 7,470 | 3.3 |
| Independent | Write-ins | 367 | 0.0 |
| Total votes | | 229,359 | 100.0 |
| Republican hold | | | |

1990 United States House of Representatives elections in California
| Party | Candidate | Votes | % |
|---|---|---|---|
| Republican | William E. Dannemeyer (Incumbent) | 113,849 | 65.3 |
| Democratic | Francis X. "Frank" Hoffman | 53,670 | 30.8 |
| Peace and Freedom | Maxine Bell Quirk | 6,709 | 3.9 |
| Total votes | | 174,228 | 100.0 |
| Republican hold | | | |

1992 Republican special U.S. Senate primary in California
| Party | Candidate | Votes | % |
|---|---|---|---|
| Republican | John Seymour (incumbent) | 1,216,096 | 51.17% |
| Republican | William E. Dannemeyer | 638,279 | 26.86% |
| Republican | Jim Trinity | 306,182 | 12.88% |
| Republican | William B. Allen | 216,177 | 9.10% |
| Total votes | | 2,376,734 | 100.00 |

1994 United States Senate Republican primary, California
| Candidate | Votes | % |
|---|---|---|
| Michael Huffington | 1,072,358 | 53.79% |
| William E. Dannemeyer | 565,864 | 28.38% |
| Kate Squires | 202,950 | 10.18% |
| James Peter Gough | 58,853 | 2.95% |
| Wolf G. Dalichau | 58,307 | 2.92% |
| John M. Brown | 35,212 | 1.77% |
| Total votes | 1,993,544 | 100.00% |

U.S. House of Representatives
| Preceded by Charles E. Wiggins | Member of the U.S. House of Representatives from California's 39th congressional district 1979–1993 | Succeeded by Ed Royce |
